= Yegorova =

Yegorova, Egorova or Jegorova (Russian: Егорова) may refer to:

- Yegorova (surname), feminine surname

== Places ==
=== Kazakhstan ===
- Yegorova River (in Cebuano), 49°53'35.38"N, 84°43'26.65"E
- Yegorova River (in Cebuano), 49°21'43.31"N, 84°43'41.52"E

=== Latvia ===
- Jegorova (Kastuļina Parish), Kastuļina Parish
- Jegorova (Mākoņkalns Parish), Mākoņkalns Parish

=== Russia ===
- Yegorova River (in Cebuano), Nenets Autonomous Okrug
- Yegorova, Krasnovishersky District, Perm Krai
- Yegorova, Kudymkarsky District, Perm Krai
- Yegorova, Ilyinsky District, Perm Krai
- Yegorova River (in Cebuano), Sakha Republic
- Yegorova River (in Cebuano), Zabaykalsky Krai

== See also ==
- Yegorov (disambiguation), the male version of the surname
