= Kirpichenko =

Kirpichenko (Russian: Кирпиченко) is a Russian surname. Among those with this name are:

- Sergei Kirpichenko (1951-2019), Russian diplomat, ambassador to the United Arab Emirates, Libya, Syria and Egypt
- Vadim Kirpichenko (1922-2005), Russian intelligence officer, General Lieutenant
- Valeriya Kirpichenko (1930-2015), Russian philologist, translator
