= Yegorov =

Yegorov, also Egorov (Russian: Егоров), or Yegorova (feminine; Егорова), is a Russian last name that is derived from the male given name Yegor and literally means Yegor's. It may refer to:

== Yegorov ==
- Aleksey Yegorov (b. 1975), Kazakhstani-Russian swimmer
- Alexander Ilyich Yegorov (1883–1939), Soviet military commander and Marshal of the Soviet Union
- Alexander Valentinovich Yegorov, Russian diplomat and ambassador
- Alexei Yegorov (disambiguation), multiple people
- Anatoly Yegorov (1922–?), Soviet water polo player
- Anatoly G. Yegorov (1920–1997), Soviet philosopher
- Boris Yegorov (1937–1994), Soviet cosmonaut
- Daniil Yegorov (b. 1975), Russian economist
- Dimitri Egorov (1869–1931), Russian mathematician
- Georgiy Yegorov (1918–2008), Soviet Admiral of the Fleet
- Igor Yegorov (b. 1958), Ukrainian economist
- Igor Egorov (b. 1968), Russian football referee
- Lubov Egorova (1880–1972), Russian dancer and teacher
- Lyubov Yegorova (b. 1966), Russian former cross country Olympic ski champion, many times world champion, and Hero of Russia
- Nikolai Yegorov (1951–1997), Russian politician
- Pavel Yegorov (1889/1895–1965), Soviet military commander
- Vladimir Yegorov (disambiguation), multiple people
- Youri Egorov (1954–1988), Russian-Dutch pianist

== Yegorova ==
- Anna Yegorova (1916–2009), Russian pilot during WW2
- Daria Egorova (born 1996), Russian cyclist
- Irina Nikolayevna Yegorova (born 1940), Russian speed skater
- Lyubov Yegorova (ballerina) (1880–1972), Russian dancer and teacher
- Lyubov Yegorova (cross-country skier), also spelled Ljubov Jegorova (born 1966), Russian cross-country skier
- Natalia Egorova (born 1966), Russian tennis player
- Olga Egorova a.k.a. Tsaplya (born 1968), Russian visual artist and director, co-founder of the Chto Delat (What Is to Be Done?) art collective
- Olga Aleksandrovna Yegorova (born 1955), Russian judge
- Olga Nikolayevna Yegorova (born 1972), Russian middle-distance runner
- Olga Valeryevna Yegorova (born 1967), Russian actress
- Polina Alexeyevna Egorova (born 2000), Russian swimmer
- Tatiana Vladimirovna Egorova (1930–2007), Russian botanist
- Valentina Yegorova (born 1964), Russian long-distance runner
- Violetta Egorova (born 1969), Russian pianist

== See also ==
- Yegorov, Kursk Oblast, khutor in Russia
