= Libya–Russia relations =

- Libya: Russia

Diplomatic mission
- Embassy of Libya, Moscow: Embassy of Russia, Tripoli

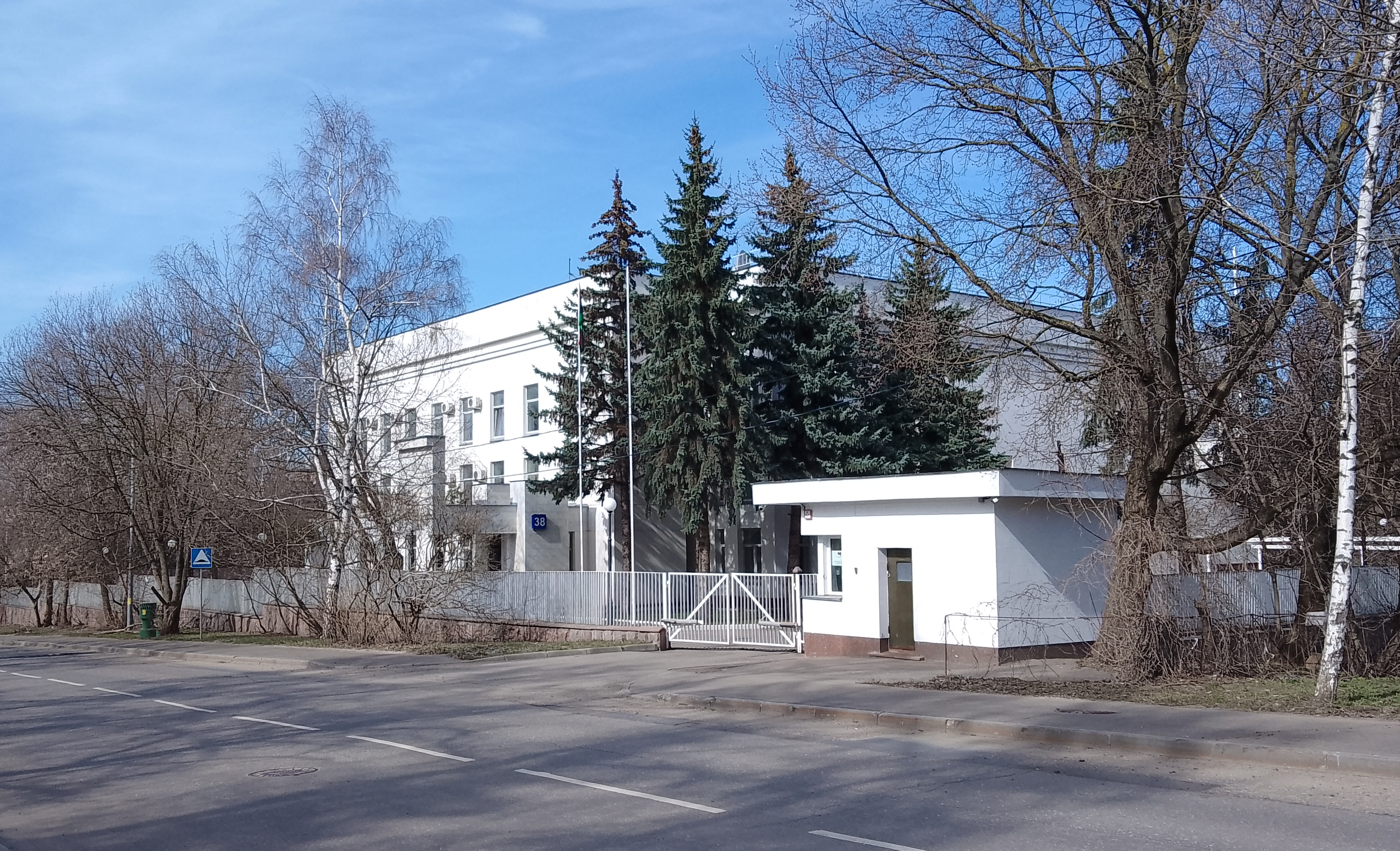
Libyan embassy in Moscow

Libya–Russia relations (Russian: Российско-ливийские отношения; Arabic: العلاقات الروسية الليبية) are the bilateral relations between the State of Libya and the Russian Federation. Russia has an embassy in Tripoli, with Libya having an embassy in Moscow. Diplomatic contact between Russia and Libya has generally been close and productive, seeing as both countries have had and continue to see volatile relations with the United States. Former Libyan leader Muammar al-Gaddafi was a close ally of the Soviet Union, despite his country's membership in the Non-Aligned Movement. Russia also regards Libya as one of its strongest allies in the Arab world, and has supported stabilization of the country following the aftermath of the Libyan Civil War. After the outbreak of new conflict, Russia has primarily backed the Tobruk-based House of Representatives over the UN-backed Government of National Accord and various other factions.

The current Russian ambassador to Libya is Aydar Aganin, while Libyan ambassador to Russia is Emhemed A.E. Almaghrawi. In the building of the Libyan embassy in Moscow, there are also representatives of the Libyan House of Representatives present. The Russian government implemented this measure.

== History ==
=== Soviet era ===
Libya-Soviet Union relations
- Libya: Soviet Union

After the overthrow of King Idris in Libya and the coming to power of Muammar Gaddafi on 1 September 1969, the Soviet Union became the first country to recognize the new republican regime on 4 September 1969. The leadership of the Libyan Arab Republic immediately declared its desire to develop cooperation with the USSR in all areas. The following years became a period of intense political, trade, economic, cultural and other ties between the two states. The head of Libya paid official visits to the USSR in 1976, 1981 and 1985.

Libyan Arab Jamahiriya-Soviet Union relations
- Libya: Soviet Union

Historically, the Libyan Arab Jamahiriya under Muammar Gaddafi had good relations with the Soviet Union, which provided the Arab nation with weaponry and military advisers throughout the 1970s and 1980s. Libya was initially sometimes critical of the Soviet Union, opposing Cuba's membership of the Non-Aligned Movement in 1973 due to its support for the USSR's communist ideology. However, ties deepened after 1976, following growing American involvement in the Middle East. Libya backed, along with the Soviet Union, Idi Amin's regime in Uganda, the PLO in Lebanon, Marxist guerrillas in Chile, the Sandinistas in Nicaragua, Angolan-Cuban forces in the Border War against South Africa and the Ethiopian government against insurgents. Libyan support for anti-imperialist forces led to the US bombing of Libya on 15 April 1986.

=== 1991–2011 ===
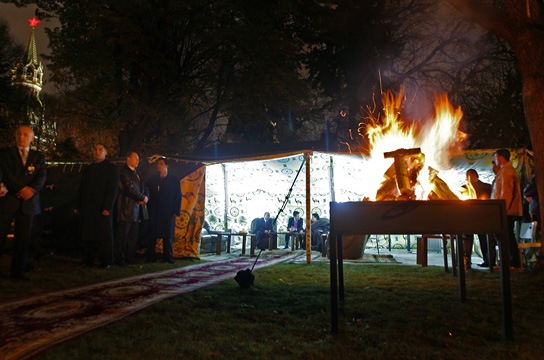
Vladimir Putin and Muammar Gaddafi in Moscow, 2008

In January 2007, Mustafa Tajouri was posted as the new Ambassador of Libya to the Russian Federation, and he presented his credentials to Vladimir Putin on 13 April 2007. In April 2008, Vladimir Putin visited Libya, which was the first visit by a Russian President to Libya.

Libyan Arab Jamahiriya-Russia relations
- Libya: Russia

Although Russia has criticized NATO's campaign in Libya, Dmitry Medvedev suggested that Colonel Gaddafi lost legitimacy and requested that he step down. Nonetheless, Russia maintained a diplomatic presence in Tripoli with the Gaddafi government until September 2011 when Moscow switched recognition to the anti-Gaddafi National Transitional Council.

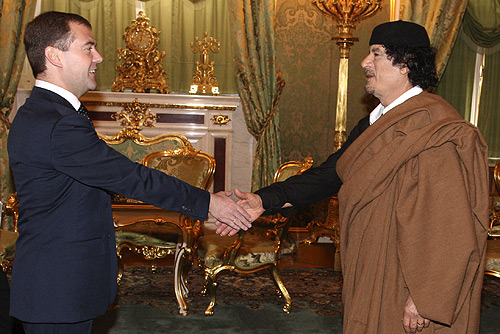
Dmitry Medvedev with Muammar Gaddafi in Kremlin, Moscow, in 2008

Vladimir Putin lashed out at the United States for killing Gaddafi and asked "They showed to the whole world how he (Gaddafi) was killed; there was blood all over. Is that what they call a democracy?" Foreign Minister Sergey Lavrov said Gaddafi should not have been killed, and added that his death should be investigated.

Russia had joined the arms sanctions against Libya, suspending all contracts for the supply of military hardware to the country in 2011 during the First Libyan Civil War. On 7 May 2012, Russia lifted its embargo on arms supplies to Libya.

=== Since 2011 ===
In 2013, after the Russian embassy in Libya was attacked, all Russian diplomats and their families were evacuated. They were said to return after the present interim government of Libya can protect the Russian diplomats and embassy.

In February 2015, after the outbreak the Second Libyan Civil War between the Tobruk-based House of Representatives and the General National Congress, discussions on supporting the former by supplying them with weapons reportedly took place in Cairo when President of Russia Vladimir Putin arrived for talks with the government of Egypt, during which the Russian delegates also spoke with a Libyan delegation. Colonel Ahmed al-Mismari, the spokesperson for the Libyan National Army's chief of staff, also stated that "Arming the Libyan army was a point of discussion between the Egyptian and Russian presidents in Cairo." The deputy foreign minister of Russia, Mikhail Bogdanov, has stated that Russia will supply the government of Libya with weapons if UN sanctions against Libya are lifted. In April 2015, Prime Minister Abdullah al-Thani visited Moscow and announced that Russia and Libya will strengthen their relations, especially economic relations. He also met with Sergei Lavrov, the Russian Minister of Foreign Affairs, and said that he request Russia's assistance in fixing the country's government institutions and military strength. The prime minister also met with Nikolai Patrushev, the Russian president's security adviser, and talked about the need to restore stability in Libya as well as the influence of terrorist groups in the country. Patrushev stated that a "priority for regional politics is the protection of the sovereignty and territorial integrity of Libya."

In the early months of 2017, Russia increased its involvement in resolving the conflict in Libya, increasingly supporting the Tobruk-based House of Representatives rather than the UN-backed Government of National Accord (GNA), which was founded in April 2015. The leader of the Libyan National Army, which is loyal to the House of Representatives, Field Marshal Khalifa Haftar, had visited Moscow several times throughout the previous year and in January 2017 was given a tour of the Russian aircraft carrier Admiral Kuznetsov, where he reportedly met with military officials and discussed weapons contracts. In late February, the GNA prime minister of Libya, Fayez al-Sarraj said he wanted Russia to mediate talks between Marshal Haftar and his government.

However, on 2 March 2017, talks took place in Moscow between Foreign Minister Sergei Lavrov, Deputy Foreign Minister Mikhail Bogdanov, and a delegation from the GNA led by Vice Premier Ahmed Maiteeq and Foreign Minister Mohamed Taha Siala. They discussed the ongoing crisis in Libya and possible solutions, with the Russian side reportedly stressing the need for dialogue between the GNA and the House of Representatives. On the same day, Mohammed al-Dairi, the Tobruk government's foreign minister, said that he welcomed Russia's increasing interest in Libya. The talks were viewed by some analysts as an effort by the GNA to increase relations with Russia in response to its increasing ties with the House of Representatives. Sergei Lavrov stated during the meeting that Russia is interested in helping Libya overcome the crisis and that it maintains contact with all Libyan factions.

During the Mediterranean Dialogue forum in Rome in December 2017, Deputy Prime Minister Ahmed Maiteeq stated that he expects Russia to take part in assisting the rebuilding of Libya after the ongoing civil war is settled. He also said they further want to increase bilateral relations. Several days earlier, Russian deputy foreign minister Mikhail Bogdanov met with Bashir Saleh Bashir, a former aide of Gaddafi, and reiterated that Russia will contribute to a peace settlement in the country.

On 3 July 2020, Russian Foreign Minister Sergey Lavrov stated that Russia will open its embassy in Libya. However, he also stated that it will be temporarily based in Tunisia.

By 2024 Russia had also built relations with strong men outside the UN recognised government, and constructed a number of secret airbases in rebel areas, probably as a bulwark to its Africa program.
