= Alexander Yegorov =

Alexander Yegorov may refer to:

- Alexander Yegorov (general) (1883–1939), Soviet military commander
- Alexander Valentinovich Yegorov (born 1951), Russian diplomat and ambassador
- Alexander Yegorov (banker) (born 1986), Belarusian banker
- Aleksandr Yegorov (luger) (born 1985), Russian luger
- Alexander Yegorov (politician) (1904–1988), a Soviet politician
- Alexander Anatolyevich Yegorov (born 1972), Russian football referee
- Alexander Egorov (artist) (born 1967), Russian painter
- Aleksandr Egorov (swimmer), Russian swimmer
- Aleksandr Egorov (Kyrgyzstani swimmer), see List of Kyrgyzstani records in swimming
