= Aganin =

Aganin (Cyrillic: Аганин) is a masculine surname, its feminine counterpart is Aganina. The surname may refer to the following notable people:

- Aydar Aganin (born 1967), Russian diplomat and journalist of Tatar descent
- Marina Aganina (born 1985), Uzbekistani pair skater
