= Vladimir Yakovlevich Yerofeyev =

Soviet diplomat

- Владимир Яковлевич Ерофеев

Soviet ambassador to Iran
- In office 3 January 1968 – 29 January 1977
- Preceded by: Grigory Zaitsev
- Succeeded by: Vladimir Vinogradov

Soviet ambassador to the United Arab Republic
- In office 6 August 1959 – 16 June 1965
- Preceded by: Yevgeny Kiselyov
- Succeeded by: Dmitri Pozhidaev

Soviet ambassador to the Yemen Arab Republic
- In office 14 August 1959 – 18 July 1962
- Preceded by: Yevgeny Kiselyov
- Succeeded by: Nikolai Sulitsky

Personal details
- Born: 1909
- Died: 1986 (aged 76–77)
- Resting place: Kuntsevo Cemetery
- Education: STANKIN
- Awards: Order of the Red Banner of Labour (twice); Order of Friendship of Peoples

Vladimir Yakovlevich Yerofeyev (Russian: Владимир Яковлевич Ерофеев; 1909–1986) was a diplomat and member of the Soviet Communist Party.
