= Vladimir Gudev =

Russian diplomat (1940–2022)

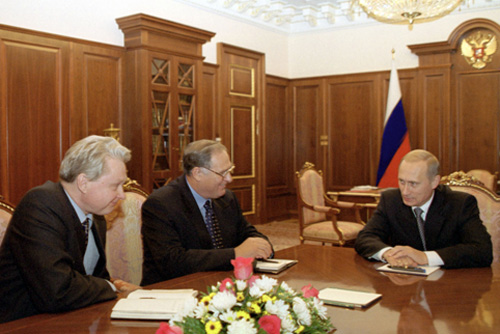
- Gudev (middle) with Nikolai Ryabov and Vladimir Putin

Ambassador of Russia to Georgia
- In office 24 August 2000 – 31 October 2002
- President: Vladimir Putin
- Preceded by: Feliks Stanevsky
- Succeeded by: Vladimir Chkhikvishvili

Ambassador of Russia to Egypt
- In office 4 July 1995 – 21 April 2000
- President: Boris Yeltsin
- Preceded by: Vladimir Polyakov
- Succeeded by: Andrey Denisov

Ambassador of Russia to Iran
- In office 26 December 1991 – 6 April 1993
- President: Boris Yeltsin
- Preceded by: position established
- Succeeded by: Sergey Tretyakov

Ambassador of the Soviet Union to Iran
- In office 23 September 1987 – 26 December 1991
- President: Mikhail Gorbachev
- Preceded by: Vil Boldyrev

Personal details
- Born: Vladimir Viktorovich Gudev; 17 September 1940; Moscow, Russian SFSR, Soviet Union
- Died: 6 January 2022 (aged 81)

Vladimir Viktorovich Gudev (Russian: Владимир Викторович Гудев; 17 September 1940 – 6 January 2022) was a Russian diplomat. He served as Ambassador from the Soviet Union and later Russia to Iran from 1987 to 1993, Ambassador to Egypt from 1995 to 2000, and Ambassador to Georgia from 2000 to 2002. He died on 6 January 2022, at the age of 81.
