= Nikolai Novikov (diplomat) =

Soviet diplomat

- Николай Новиков
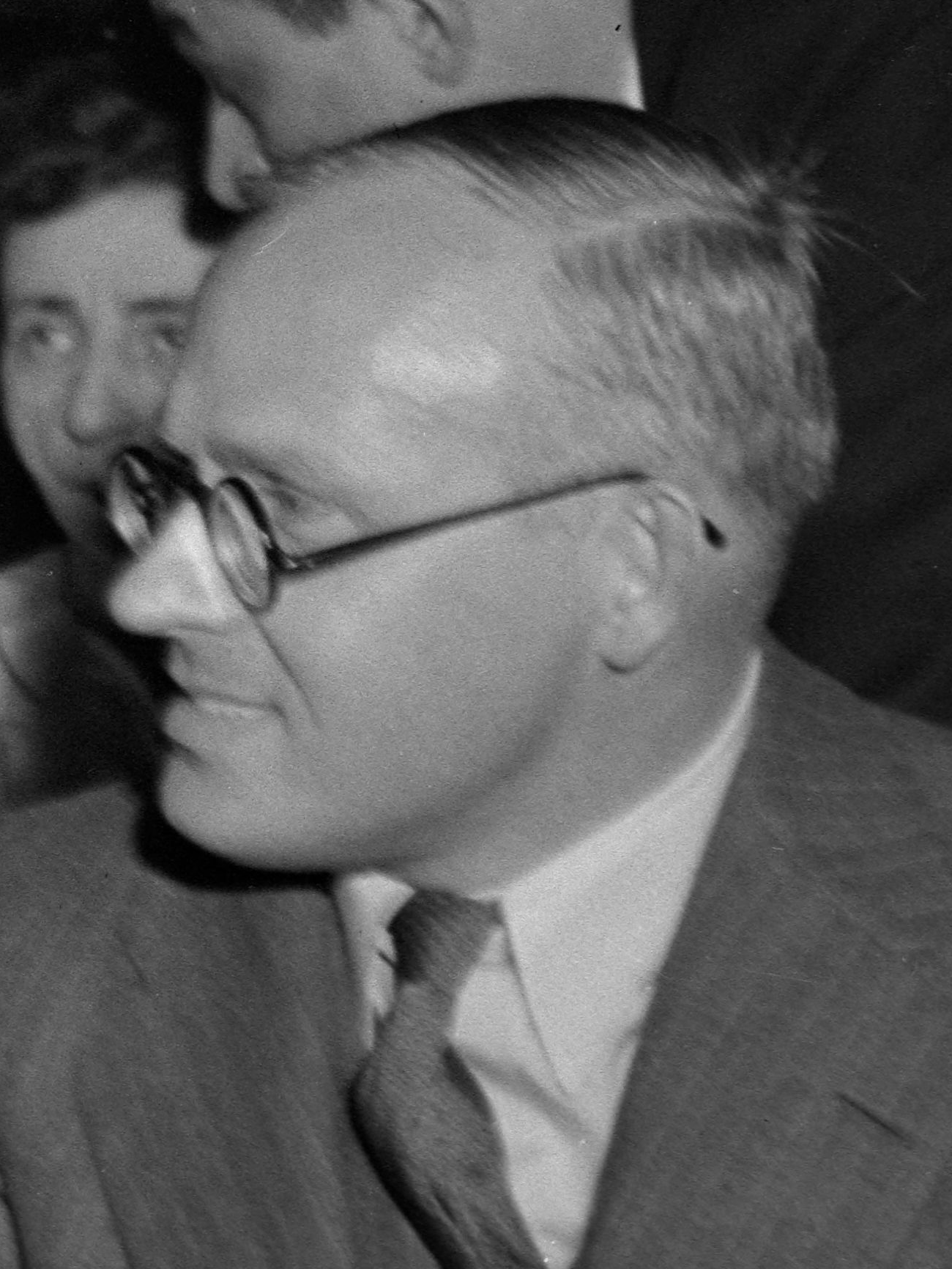
- Novikov in 1945

Soviet ambassador to the United States
- In office 11 April 1946 – 25 October 1947
- Preceded by: Andrei Gromyko
- Succeeded by: Alexander Panyushkin

Soviet ambassador to Greece
- In office 12 November 1943 – 11 December 1945
- Preceded by: Aleksandr Bogomolov
- Succeeded by: Konstantin Rodionov

Soviet envoy to Egypt
- In office 14 October 1943 – 16 November 1944
- Preceded by: Position established
- Succeeded by: Aleksei Shchiborin

Personal details
- Born: 17 February 1903
- Died: 10 April 1989 (aged 86)

Nikolai Vasilyevich Novikov (Russian: Никола́й Васи́льевич Но́виков; 7 February 1903 – 10 April 1989) was a Soviet diplomat born in Saint Petersburg.

== Biography ==
He graduated from the Oriental Institute in St. Petersburg in 1930. In the following years, he held various scientific and academic positions, also serving in the Foreign Office in Moscow and Soviet representative in Cairo during World War II. Most notably, he served as ambassador of the Soviet Union to the United States, being named to that post on 10 April 1946 until he was relieved of his duties on 24 October 1947; he had been away from Washington since being recalled to Moscow for consultations on 26 July that year.

Novikov and his wife had two sons, Yuri (b. 1939) and Nikolai (b. 1943).

In 1990, during Glasnost, some of Novikov's papers from 1946 were released; this revealed the influential "Novikov telegram" or "Novikov report" which was, in part, a reaction to the highly critical telegram of George F. Kennan (Joseph Stalin and Vyacheslav Molotov were among the audience of this "top secret" article.)

== Gallery ==
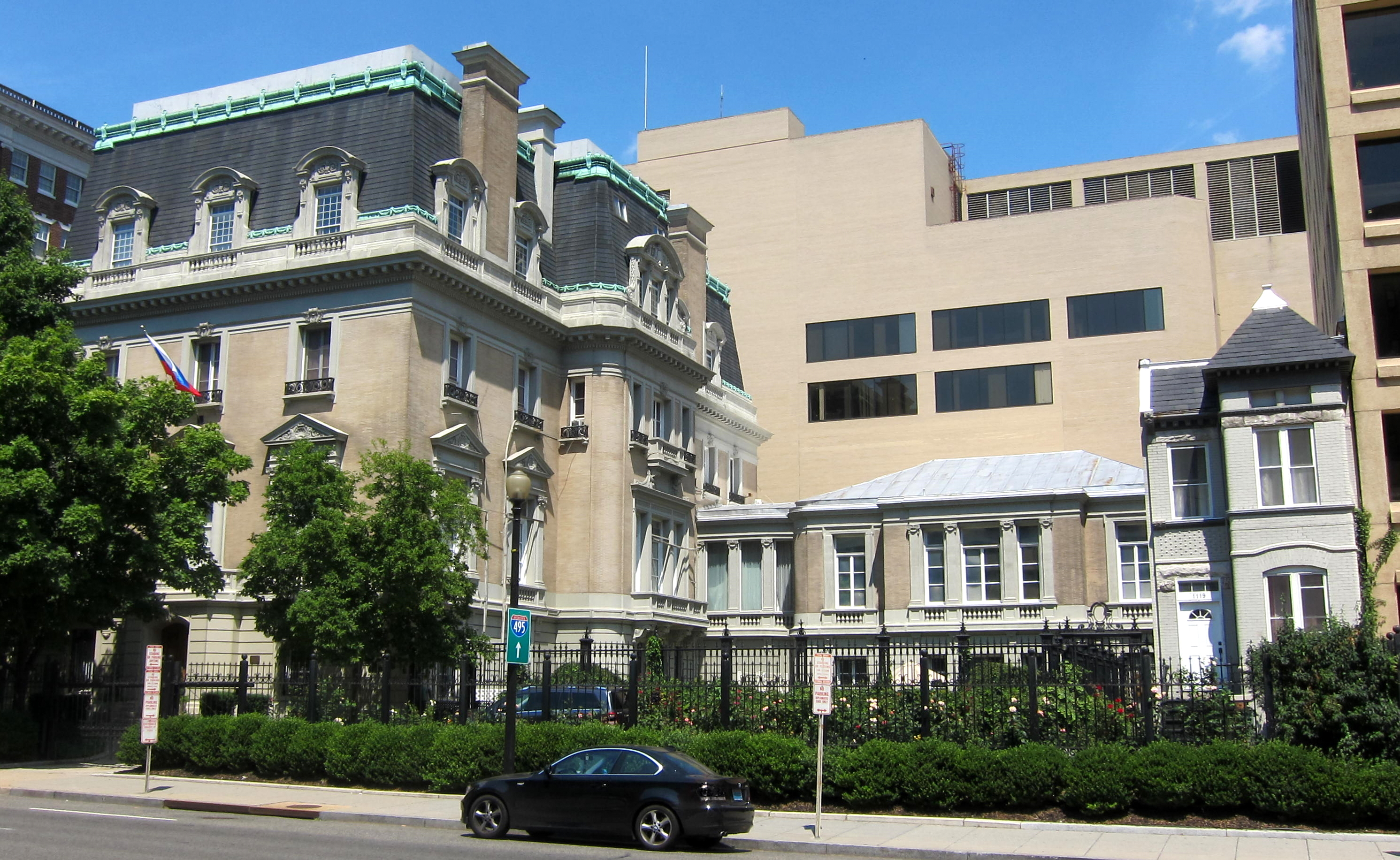
Novikov's former residence in Washington, D.C.
