= Valerian Shuvaev =

Russian diplomat (1955–2024)

- Валерьян Шуваев

Ambassador of Russia to Algeria
- In office 27 May 2022 – 3 July 2024
- President: Vladimir Putin
- Preceded by: Igor Belyayev
- Succeeded by: Aleksey Solomatin

Ambassador of Russia to Morocco
- In office 24 April 2018 – 27 May 2022
- Preceded by: Valery Vorobyov
- Succeeded by: Vladimir Baybakov

Ambassador of Russia to Iraq
- In office 16 October 2008 – 2 March 2012
- Preceded by: Vladimir Chamov
- Succeeded by: Ilya Morgunov

Ambassador of Russia to Libya
- In office 13 February 2004 – 16 October 2008
- Preceded by: Sergei Kirpichenko
- Succeeded by: Vladimir Chamov

Personal details
- Born: Valerian Vladimirovich Shuvaev; 16 March 1955 Barnaul, Russian SFSR, Soviet Union
- Died: 3 July 2024 (aged 69) Algiers, Algeria
- Education: Moscow State Institute of International Relations
- Awards: Order of Courage

Valerian Vladimirovich Shuvaev (Russian: Валерьян Владимирович Шуваев; 16 March 1955 – 3 July 2024) was a Russian diplomat. He worked in a number of North African and Middle Eastern countries, and served as ambassador of Russia to Libya between 2004 and 2008, to Iraq between 2008 and 2012, to Morocco between 2018 and 2022, and to Algeria from 2022 until his death in 2024.

== Biography ==
Shuvaev was born on 16 March 1955 in Barnaul, in what was then the Russian Soviet Federative Socialist Republic, in the Soviet Union. He graduated from Moscow State Institute of International Relations in 1977, and was assigned to the Soviet embassy in Lebanon. He worked there between 1977 and 1981, and again between 1986 and 1991. From 1992 until 1995, he was a department head in the Ministry of Foreign Affairs's Middle East and North Africa Department, and then minister-counselor at the Russian embassy in Morocco from 1995 until 1998. He once again returned to Russia to serve as a department head and deputy director of the Foreign Ministry's Middle East and North Africa Department until 2004.

Shuvaev was the Russian ambassador to Libya between 2004 and 2008, and then ambassador to Iraq between 2008 and 2012. This was followed with another posting in the central apparatus of the ministry, again as a department head and deputy director of the Middle East and North Africa Department until 2018. That year he was appointed ambassador to Morocco until 2022, and then ambassador to Algeria in May 2022. He was serving as such when he died in Algiers on 3 July 2024, at the age of 69.

Shuvaev had the diplomatic rank of Ambassador Extraordinary and Plenipotentiary, and had been awarded the Order of Courage. He had received an official letter of thanks from the President of Russia, and had the title of Honorary Worker of the Russian Foreign Ministry. He was married, with two children. In addition to his native Russian, he also spoke French and Arabic.
