= Mustafa Tajouri =

Libyan diplomat

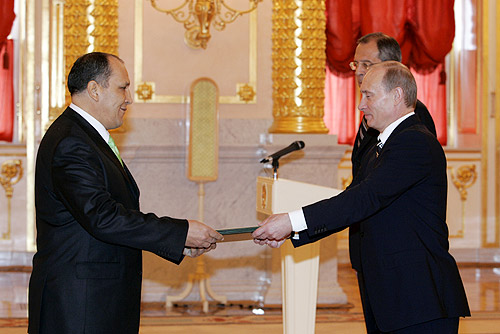
Mustafa Miftah Taher Tajuri presents his letter of credentials to Vladimir Putin in April 2007

Mustafa Muftak Tahir Tajouri (Arabic: مصطفى تاجوري) is the Ambassador Extraordinary and Plenipotentiary of the Great Socialist People's Libyan Arab Jamahiriya to the Russian Federation.

Tajouri graduated from the Military College of the Great Jamahiriya in 1982, from which he pursued a career in the Libyan military. After reaching the rank of colonel, he took on teaching roles at a variety of Libyan military educational institutions.

In January 2007, Tajouri was posted as the new Ambassador of Libya to the Russian Federation, and he presented his credentials to Vladimir Putin on 13 April 2007.

== See also ==
- Embassy of Libya in Moscow
- Libya–Russia relations
