= Suren Tovmasyan =

Soviet Armenian politician (1910–1980)

- Սուրեն Թովմասյան
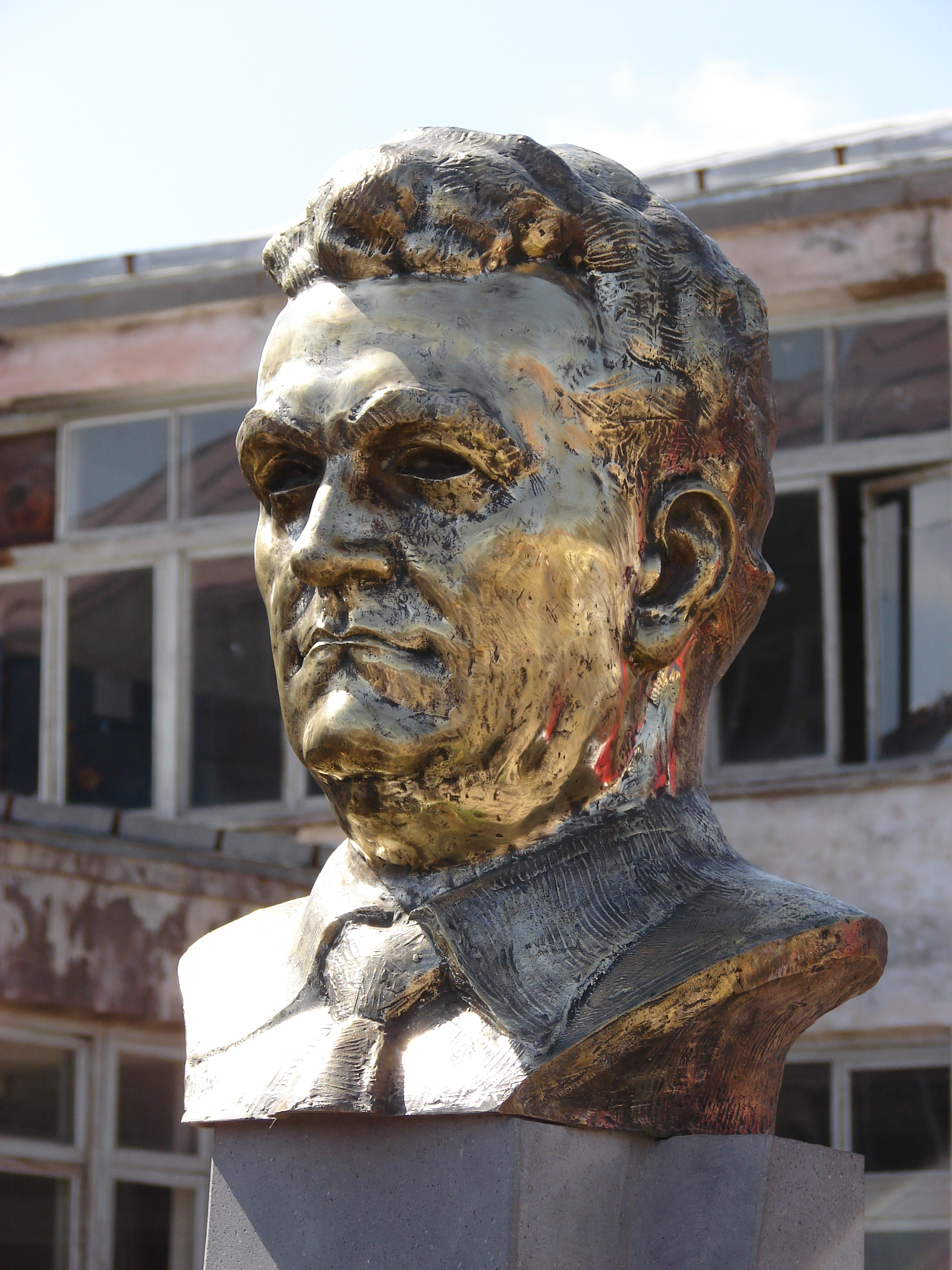
- Suren Tovmasyan monument, Shinuhayr, Syunik Province, Armenia

Ambassador of the Soviet Union to Libya
- In office 6 April 1965 – 14 February 1970
- Preceded by: Dmitrii Zaikin
- Succeeded by: Ivan Yakushin

Ambassador of the Soviet Union to the Democratic Republic of Vietnam
- In office 10 April 1961 – 7 September 1964
- Preceded by: Leonid Sokolov
- Succeeded by: Ilya Shcherbakov

First Secretary of the Communist Party of Armenia
- In office 30 November 1953 – 28 December 1960
- Preceded by: Grigory Arutinov
- Succeeded by: Yakov Zarobyan

Personal details
- Born: Suren Hakobi Tovmasyan; 20 December 1909 (2 January 1910) Shinuhayr, Zangezur uezd, Elizavetpol Governorate, Russian Empire
- Died: February 10, 1980 (aged 70) Yerevan, Armenian SSR, Soviet Union
- Party: CPSU / Communist Party of Armenia
- Occupation: politician, diplomat

Suren Hakobi Tovmasyan (Armenian: Սուրեն Հակոբի Թովմասյան; 20 December 1909 (2 January 1910) – 10 February 1980) was a Soviet Armenian politician and diplomat who served as the First Secretary of the Communist Party of Armenia from 1953 to 1960, and later as Soviet ambassador to North Vietnam and to Libya.

== Biography ==
Tovmasyan was born in the village of Shinuhayr in the Zangezur (Syunik) region of Russian Armenia. He rose through the party ranks to become the First Secretary of Armenia at the recommendation of Pyotr Pospelov on 30 November 1953, following the downfall of Grigory Arutinov.

As First Secretary, Tovmasyan oversaw the beginning of the Khrushchev Thaw in Armenia and worked with Anastas Mikoyan to rehabilitate several former political prisoners in the republic. Following Mikoyan's example, he praised the poet Yeghishe Charents in a speech before the 20th Congress of the CPSU. Tovmasyan was later dismissed from his post in 1960, for his "relaxed attitude toward 'ideological flaws,'" including tolerance for writers like Paruyr Sevak, who allegedly displayed "nationalist tendencies." He was transferred to diplomatic work, serving as Soviet ambassador to North Vietnam from 1961 to 1964 and then as Soviet ambassador to Libya from 1965 to 1970. He died on 10 February 1980.

== Bibliography ==
- Grybkauskas, Saulius (2020). Governing the Soviet Union's National Republics: The Second Secretaries of the Communist Party. London: Routledge. ISBN 978-1138391758.
- Matossian, Mary Kilbourne (1962). The Impact of Soviet Policies in Armenia. Leiden: E.J. Brill.
- Shakarian, Pietro A. (2025). Anastas Mikoyan: An Armenian Reformer in Khrushchev's Kremlin. Bloomington: Indiana University Press. ISBN 978-0253073556.
