= Dmitri Pozhidaev =

Russian diplomat

- Дмитрий Петрович Пожидаев

Ambassador of the Soviet Union to Burundi
- In office 10 July 1974 – 28 January 1980
- Preceded by: Aleksei Naumov
- Succeeded by: Valeriy Levikov

Ambassador of the Soviet Union to the United Arab Republic
- In office 16 June 1965 – 29 August 1967
- Preceded by: Vladimir Yerofeyev
- Succeeded by: Sergei Vinogradov

Ambassador of the Soviet Union to Morocco
- In office 11 November 1958 – 20 July 1962
- Preceded by: None
- Succeeded by: Aleksei Shvedov

Ambassador of the Soviet Union to Switzerland
- In office 7 September 1957 – 11 November 1958
- Preceded by: Pavel Yershov
- Succeeded by: Nikolai Koryukin

Personal details
- Born: Dmitri Petrovich Pozhidaev; 1913
- Died: 1989; Moscow, Soviet Union
- Awards: Order of the Badge of Honour (2); Order of the Red Banner of Labour; Order of the Red Star

Dmitri Petrovich Pozhidaev (Russian: Дмитрий Петрович Пожидаев, 1913 – 1989) was a Soviet diplomat who served as ambassador to Egypt during the Six-Day War in 1967. According to one work on the Six-Day War, Pozhidaev was believed by officials in the United States to have "contributed to the rising tensions", with one official referring to him as "one big trouble-maker". In August 1967, shortly after the Six Day War, he was removed as ambassador to Egypt and transferred to an unspecified post.

As Soviet archives for the period remain closed the details of his role are not clear.
