= Aleksandr Aksenyonok =

Russian diplomat (born 1942)

- Александр Аксенёнок

Ambassador of Russia to Slovakia
- In office 11 November 1998 – 14 August 2002
- President: Boris Yeltsin; Vladimir Putin
- Preceded by: Sergey Zotov
- Succeeded by: Aleksey Borodavkin

Ambassador of the Soviet Union/Russia to Algeria
- In office 19 February 1991 – 4 September 1995
- President: Mikhail Gorbachev; Boris Yeltsin
- Preceded by: Vasily Taratuta
- Succeeded by: Valery Yegoshkin

Personal details
- Born: 10 April 1942 (age 84) Chermoz, Perm Oblast, Russian SFSR, Soviet Union
- Education: Moscow State Institute of International Relations (MGIMO)
- Profession: Diplomat
- Awards: Knight of the Order of the Double White Cross, 2nd Class; Honored Employee of the Diplomatic Service of the Russian Federation; Gratitude of the President of the Russian Federation

Aleksandr Georgiyevich Aksenyonok (Russian: Александр Георгиевич Аксенёнок; born 10 April 1942) is a Soviet and Russian diplomat. He holds the diplomatic rank of Ambassador Extraordinary and Plenipotentiary.

== Biography ==
Aksenyonok is the son of legal scholar Georgy Aksenyonok (1910–1989). He was born in the town of Chyormoz (now in the Ilinsky District of Perm Krai). He graduated from the Moscow State Institute of International Relations (MGIMO) of the USSR Ministry of Foreign Affairs (1965) and completed advanced training courses for senior diplomatic personnel at the Diplomatic Academy of the Ministry of Foreign Affairs of the USSR (1991). He holds a Candidate of Legal Sciences degree. He is fluent in Arabic, English, and French.

Aksenyonok has been working in the diplomatic service since 1963. From 1963 to 1965, he was a translator at the Soviet embassy in Libya, and then from 1966 to 1968, worked in the embassy in Lebanon. From 1968 to 1971, he worked in the embassy in Iraq, and then from 1975 to 1978, in the embassy in Egypt. From 1978 to 1981, he worked at the Soviet embassy in the Yemen Arab Republic, and from 1984 to 1988, he was a Minister Counselor at the embassy in Syria. From 1988 to 1990, he was a Chief Advisor, Deputy Head, and Head of the Department of Assessments and Planning of the Soviet Ministry of Foreign Affairs. Then from 19 February to 25 December 1991, he was the Ambassador Extraordinary and Plenipotentiary of the Soviet Union to Algeria. With the dissolution of the Soviet Union, Aksenyonok served as Russian ambassador to Algeria between 25 December 1991, to 4 September 1995.

From 1995 to 1996, Aksenyonok was a Chief Advisor to the First European Department of the Russian Ministry of Foreign Affairs, and from 1996 to 1998, he was an Ambassador-at-Large of the Ministry of Foreign Affairs. From 11 November 1998, to 14 August 2002, he was the Ambassador Extraordinary and Plenipotentiary of the Russian Federation to Slovakia.

Aksenyonok retired in 2002. Currently, he serves as a managing director in a department of Vnesheconombank and is a member of the Expert Council of the Federation Council Committee on International Affairs.

== Family ==
Aksenyonok is married and has two children.

== Awards ==
- Gratitude of the President of the Republic of Croatia (15 January 1998) — "for his special contribution to the implementation of the peacekeeping mission of the United Nations Transitional Administration for Eastern Slavonia, Baranja and Western Sirmium (UNTAES), as well as for active cooperation with the Croatian authorities and the local population, which successfully ended the peaceful reintegration of Croatian Danube into the constitutional and legal order of the Republic of Croatia."
- Knight of the Order of the White Double Cross, 2nd Class (2002, Slovakia).
- Gratitude of the President of the Russian Federation (21 September 2002) — "for active participation in the implementation of the foreign policy course of the Russian Federation and many years of conscientious work."
- Honored Employee of the Diplomatic Service of the Russian Federation (21 May 2025) — "for his great contribution to the implementation of the foreign policy course of the Russian Federation and many years of conscientious diplomatic service."

== Diplomatic Rank ==
- Envoy Extraordinary and Minister Plenipotentiary, 1st class (19 February 1991).
- Ambassador Extraordinary and Plenipotentiary (18 October 1993).
