= Valeriya Kirpichenko =

Russian academic

- Born: 11 January 1930; Krasnogvardeysk, Leningrad Oblast, Russian SFSR, USSR
- Died: 2 June 2015 (aged 85)
- Resting place: Troyekurovskoye Cemetery, Moscow
- Education: Moscow Institute of Oriental Studies
- Occupations: Orientalist, translator, philologist
- Spouse: Vadim Kirpichenko
- Children: Sergei Kirpichenko
- Writing career
- Subject: Arabic literature

Valeriya Nikolaevna Kirpichenko (Russian: Валерия Николаевна Кирпиченко, 11 January 1930 – 2 June 2015) was a Russian orientalist, translator, and philologist, specialising in Arabic literature.

Born in 1930, Kirpichenko studied at the Moscow Institute of Oriental Studies, graduating in 1962 and carrying out further academic study into the works of Egyptian author Yusuf Idris, defended her thesis in 1970. In 1974 she began working as a professor at the Institute of Oriental Studies of the Russian Academy of Sciences, where she would spend the rest of her life, becoming a doctor of philological sciences in 1987. Over her life she authored more than 30 books and translated a number of Arabic authors into Russian. In 2014 she was honoured as one of the ten best Arabic translators in the world. She married another Russian specialist in Arabic culture, Vadim Kirpichenko, who served as a KGB intelligence officer and resident in Tunisia and Egypt, while their son, Sergei Kirpichenko, was another Arabic specialist, this time in the diplomatic service, who had postings to several Middle Eastern countries, including as ambassador to Egypt.

== Career ==
Kirpichenko was born on 11 January 1930 in Krasnogvardeysk, now the town of Gatchina, in Leningrad Oblast, part of the Russian SFSR, in the Soviet Union. She enrolled at the Moscow Institute of Oriental Studies, graduating in 1962. In 1970 she defended her thesis on the topic "The creative path of the Egyptian novelist Yusuf Idris", and in 1987 became a doctor of philological sciences. In 1974 she joined the Institute of Oriental Studies of the Russian Academy of Sciences, where she worked as a professor in the Department of Asian literature until her death in 2015. She also sat on the dissertation council of the Academy's Gorky Institute of World Literature.

Over her lifetime she was the author of more than 30 books on Egyptian literature, including a two-volume work on modern Egyptian prose, and published a number of translations of literary works from Arabic into Russian. Among these are biographies of early Egyptian ruler Baibars, and the works of Nobel Prize in Literature laureate Naguib Mahfouz. British scholar and Arabic translator Roger Allen listed her as one of the scholars who worked to integrate "the heritages of Middle Eastern cultures into the environment of Western academe."

In February 2014 Kirpichenko attended the third conference on the topic of "Translation and the Knowledge Society", hosted at the Cairo Opera House by the Higher Council for the Culture of Egypt. Here she was one of ten people recognised by hostess Suzanne Mubarak as the best Arabic translators in the world who "made the greatest contribution to the rapprochement of peoples' cultures." She also received plaudits from the Russian ambassador to Egypt Mikhail Bogdanov, and the Director General of Russian centers of science and culture in Egypt O. I. Fomin and his deputy N. T. Syzdykbekov.

She married Vadim Kirpichenko, an Arabic specialist with the KGB's First Chief Directorate, who served as a resident in Tunisia and Egypt. The couple had a son and two daughters together, all of whom became Arabic specialists. Their son, Sergei Vadimovich, rose to a high rank in the diplomatic service, and was ambassador to Egypt from 2011 until his death in 2019. Vadim died in 2005.

== Death ==
Kirpichenko died on 2 June 2015. According to her family she died shortly after completing her translation of the works of Arab scholar, writer and journalist Ahmad Faris Shidyaq. Tributes to her life and work were paid by the Oriental and the History of the Middle East Departments of Saint Petersburg State University, and the Department of Arabic Philology of Dagestan State University. She was buried in the Troyekurovskoye Cemetery in Moscow on Saturday, 6 June 2015, beside her husband.
