= List of ambassadors of Russia to Morocco =

Ambassador of the Russian Federation to the Kingdom of Morocco
- Ambassade de la Fédération de Russie au Royaume du Maroc
- Emblem of the Russian Foreign Ministry
- Incumbent; Vladimir Baybakov since 27 May 2022
- Ministry of Foreign Affairs; Embassy of Russia in Rabat
- Style: His Excellency; The Honourable
- Reports to: Minister of Foreign Affairs
- Seat: Rabat
- Appointer: President of Russia
- Term length: At the pleasure of the president
- Website: Embassy of Russia in Rabat

The ambassador of Russia to Morocco is the official representative of the president and the government of the Russian Federation to the king and the government of Morocco.

The ambassador and his staff work at large in the Russian Embassy in Rabat. There is a consulate-general in Casablanca, as well as a trade mission in Rabat. There are offices of Rossotrudnichestvo and the Federal Agency for Fishery in Rabat, where the Russian Orthodox Church and the news agency TASS also have representatives based.

The current Russian ambassador to Morocco is Vladimir Baybakov, incumbent since 27 May 2022.

== History of diplomatic relations ==
Relations between the Russian Empire and the Alawi Sultanate date back to late 1777, when Sultan Mohammed ben Abdallah proposed the establishment of official contacts and the opening of trade with Empress Catherine the Great. Official letters were exchanged, and in July 1778 the Sultan proposed receiving a Russian representative. A Russian consulate was opened in Tangier in November 1897, with the first representative, Vasily Bakherakht, taking up his post in May 1898. French control over Morocco gradually expanded in the early 20th century, with the eventual establishment of a French protectorate in 1912. Diplomatic relations with Morocco as an independent state therefore came to an end, and diplomatic affairs were handled through the embassy in France. This state of affairs lasted until the 1950s, when anti-colonial forces in Morocco rose up in the Revolution of the King and the People, and secured Moroccan independence by 1956. The Soviet Union moved to establish diplomatic relations, with a formal agreement to exchange ambassadors on 1 September 1958. The first Soviet ambassador, Dmitri Pozhidaev, was appointed on 11 October 1958, and presented his letter of credence on 5 November 1958. With the dissolution of the Soviet Union in 1991, the Kingdom of Morocco recognised the Russian Federation as its successor on 30 December 1991. Representatives have continued to be appointed between the two countries since this time.

== List of representatives (1897–present) ==
=== Russian Empire to the Sultanate of Morocco (1897–1912) ===
Name	Title	Appointment	Termination	Notes
Vasily Bakherakht	Minister-Resident and Consul-General	4 December 1897	1906	
Pyotr Botkin	Minister-Resident and Consul-General	1907	1912	
Ivan Korostovets	Envoy	1912	1912	

=== Soviet Union to the Kingdom of Morocco (1958–1991) ===
Name	Title	Appointment	Termination	Notes
Dmitri Pozhidaev	Ambassador	11 October 1958	20 July 1962	Letter of credence 5 November 1958
Aleksey Shvedov	Ambassador	20 July 1962	13 August 1965	Letter of credence 31 October 1962
Luka Palamarchuk	Ambassador	13 August 1965	25 October 1972	Letter of credence 4 November 1965
Sergei Kiktev	Ambassador	25 October 1972	26 December 1973	Letter of credence 12 December 1972
Dmitry Goryunov	Ambassador	26 December 1973	3 October 1978	Letter of credence 29 January 1974
Yevgeny Nersesov	Ambassador	3 October 1978	24 December 1983	Letter of credence 24 January 1979
Malik Fazylov	Ambassador	24 December 1983	1990	Letter of credence 25 July 1984
Yuri Rybakov	Ambassador	1990	25 December 1991	

=== Russian Federation to the Kingdom of Morocco (1991–present) ===
Name	Title	Appointment	Termination	Notes
Yuri Rybakov	Ambassador	25 December 1991	2 November 1992	
Vasily Kolotusha	Ambassador	16 December 1992	31 December 1999	
Yuri Kotov	Ambassador	31 December 1999	17 February 2004	
Aleksandr Tokovinin	Ambassador	17 February 2004	27 August 2008	
Boris Bolotin	Ambassador	27 August 2008	4 July 2013	
Valery Vorobyov	Ambassador	4 July 2013	24 April 2018	
Valerian Shuvaev	Ambassador	24 April 2018	27 May 2022	
Vladimir Baybakov	Ambassador	27 May 2022		

== See also ==
- List of ambassadors of Morocco to Russia
