= List of ambassadors of Russia to Iran =

Ambassador of the Russian Federation to the Islamic Republic of Iran
- سفیر فدراسیون روسیه در جمهوری اسلامی ایران
- Emblem of the Russian Foreign Ministry
- Incumbent; Alexey Dedov since 8 September 2022
- Ministry of Foreign Affairs; Embassy of Russia in Tehran
- Style: His Excellency
- Reports to: Minister of Foreign Affairs
- Seat: Tehran
- Appointer: President of Russia
- Term length: At the pleasure of the president
- Website: Embassy of the Russian Federation in the Islamic Republic of Iran

The ambassador extraordinary and plenipotentiary of the Russian Federation to the Islamic Republic of Iran is the official representative of the president and the government of the Russian Federation to the president and the government of Iran.

The ambassador and his staff work at large in the Embassy of Russia in Tehran. There are consulates general in Isfahan and Rasht. The post of Russian ambassador to Iran is currently held by Alexey Dedov, incumbent since 8 September 2022.

== History of diplomatic relations ==
Diplomatic relations between Russia and Iran date back to the medieval period, with the first visit of an envoy from Persia to the Grand Duchy of Moscow being recorded in 1592. The first Russian ambassador, Artemy Volynsky, was appointed in 1715, during the reign of Peter the Great. Following the Russian Revolution in 1917, diplomatic relations were briefly broken off, but were soon re-established, between Persia and at first the Russian Soviet Federative Socialist Republic, and later the Soviet Union. Following the dissolution of the Soviet Union in 1991, the incumbent Soviet ambassador, Vladimir Gudev, continued as representative of the Russian Federation until 1993.

== List of representatives (1715–present) ==
=== Tsardom of Russia to Persia (1715–1721) ===
Name	Title	Appointment	Termination	Notes
Artemy Volynsky	Envoy	1715	1719	
Semyon Avramov	Consul, Resident	1717	1721	

=== Russian Empire to Persia (1721–1917) ===
Name	Title	Appointment	Termination	Notes
Semyon Avramov	Consul, Resident	1721	1732	
Sergey Golitsyn	Ambassador	1734	1735	
Ivan Kalushkin	Resident	1737	1742	
Vasily Bratishchev	Resident	1742	1748	
Mikhail Golitsyn	Consul	1745	1748	
Ivan Danilov	Consul	1748	1751	
Petr Chekalevsky	Consul	18 December 1755	25 May 1760	
Ilya Igumnov	Consul	1763	1769	
Gavriil Bogolyubov	Consul	1769	1772	
Vasily Yablonsky	Consul	1772	1775	
Ivan Tumanovsky	Consul	1780	1785	
Dmitri Skilichi	Consul	1782	1790	
Sergey Lashkarev	Appointed chargé d'affaires	1786	1786	Did not take up position
Mikhail Skibinevsky	Chargé d'affaires	c. 1787	1804	
Russo-Persian War - Diplomatic relations interrupted (10 June 1804 - 24 October 1813)
Alexey Yermolov	Ambassador	29 June 1817	10 October 1817	
Semyon Mazarovich	Chargé d'affaires	6 July 1818	July 1826	
Russo-Persian War - Diplomatic relations interrupted (16 July 1826 - 10 February 1828); Aleksandr Obreskov assigned as diplomatic agent between 4 April 1827 and 21 April 1828 to negotiate the Treaty of Turkmenchay
Alexander Griboyedov	Minister Plenipotentiary	25 April 1828	30 January 1829	
Nikolai Dolgorukov	Special representative	1 April 1829	30 June 1830	
Ivan Simonich	Minister Plenipotentiary	5 January 1832	30 April 1838	
Alexander Du Hamel	Minister Plenipotentiary	30 April 1838	9 August 1841	
Alexander von Medem	Minister Plenipotentiary	9 August 1841	11 June 1845	
Dmitry Dolgorukov	Minister Plenipotentiary	11 June 1845	20 March 1854	
Nikolai Anichkov	Chargé d'affaires (before 5 April 1858); Envoy (after 5 April 1858)	20 March 1854	15 January 1863	
Nikolay Girs	Envoy	1 August 1863	6 January 1869	
Aleksandr Beger	Envoy	7 January 1869	24 February 1876	
Ivan Zinovyev	Envoy	20 April 1876	25 February 1883	
Aleksandr Melnikov	Envoy	25 February 1883	22 October 1886	
Nikolai Dolgorukov	Envoy	25 October 1886	12 November 1889	
Eugene de Bützow	Envoy	5 October 1889	1 July 1897	
Kimon Argyropoulo	Envoy	1 July 1897	8 August 1902	
Pyotr Vlasov	Envoy	8 August 1902	1905	
Alexey Shpeyer	Envoy	1905	1906	
Nicholas Hartwig	Envoy	1906	1908	
Stanislav Poklevsky-Kozell	Envoy	1909	1913	
Ivan Korostovets	Envoy	1913	1915	
Nikolai Etter	Envoy	1915	3 March 1917	

=== Russian Provisional Government to Persia (March 1917–unaccredited after October 1917) ===
Name	Title	Appointment	Termination	Notes
Ivan Kolomiytsev	Chief of mission	July 1917	November 1918	
Efim Babushkin	Consul General	September 1918	1919	
Ivan Kolomiytsev	Chief of mission	28 June 1919	27 August 1919	

=== Russian Soviet Federative Socialist Republic to Persia (1921–1923) ===
Name	Title	Appointment	Termination	Notes
Theodore Rothstein	Plenipotentiary Representative	27 February 1921	19 March 1923	
Boris Shumyatsky	Plenipotentiary Representative	19 March 1923	19 July 1923	

=== Union of Soviet Socialist Republics to Persia/Iran (1923–1991) ===
Name	Title	Appointment	Termination	Notes
Boris Shumyatsky	Plenipotentiary Representative	19 July 1923	14 April 1925	
Konstantin Yurenev	Plenipotentiary Representative	24 April 1925	5 August 1927	
Yakov Davydov	Plenipotentiary Representative	5 August 1927	1 October 1930	
Adolf Petrovsky	Plenipotentiary Representative	21 December 1930	1 April 1933	
Sergey Pastukhov	Plenipotentiary Representative	29 May 1933	1 April 1935	
Aleksey Chernykh	Plenipotentiary Representative	1 April 1935	14 January 1939	
Matvey Filimonov	Plenipotentiary Representative (before 9 May 1941); Ambassador (after 9 May 1941)	11 September 1939	28 June 1941	
Andrey Smirnov	Ambassador	28 June 1941	1 September 1943	
Konstantin Mikhailov	Ambassador	1 September 1943	21 May 1944	
Mikhail Maksimov	Ambassador	28 June 1944	26 February 1946	
Ivan Sadchikov	Ambassador	26 February 1946	17 July 1953	
Anatoly Lavrentiev	Ambassador	17 July 1953	19 August 1956	
Nikolai Pegov	Ambassador	19 August 1956	4 June 1963	
Grigory Zaeitsev	Ambassador	4 June 1963	3 January 1968	
Vladimir Yerofeyev	Ambassador	3 January 1968	29 January 1977	
Vladimir Vinogradov	Ambassador	29 January 1977	2 June 1982	
Vil Boldyrev	Ambassador	2 June 1982	23 September 1987	
Vladimir Gudev	Ambassador	23 September 1987	25 December 1991	

=== Russian Federation to Iran (1991–present) ===
Name	Title	Appointment	Termination	Notes
Vladimir Gudev	Ambassador	25 December 1991	6 April 1993	
Sergey Tretyakov	Ambassador	6 April 1993	6 June 1997	
Konstantin Shuvalov	Ambassador	6 June 1997	8 February 2001	
Aleksandr Maryasov	Ambassador	8 February 2001	30 May 2005	
Aleksandr Sadovnikov	Ambassador	30 May 2005	17 October 2011	
Levan Dzhagaryan	Ambassador	17 October 2011	8 September 2022	
Alexey Dedov	Ambassador	8 September 2022		

== See also ==
- Foreign relations of Iran
- Foreign relations of Russia
