= Grigory Arutinov =

Soviet Armenian politician (1900–1957)

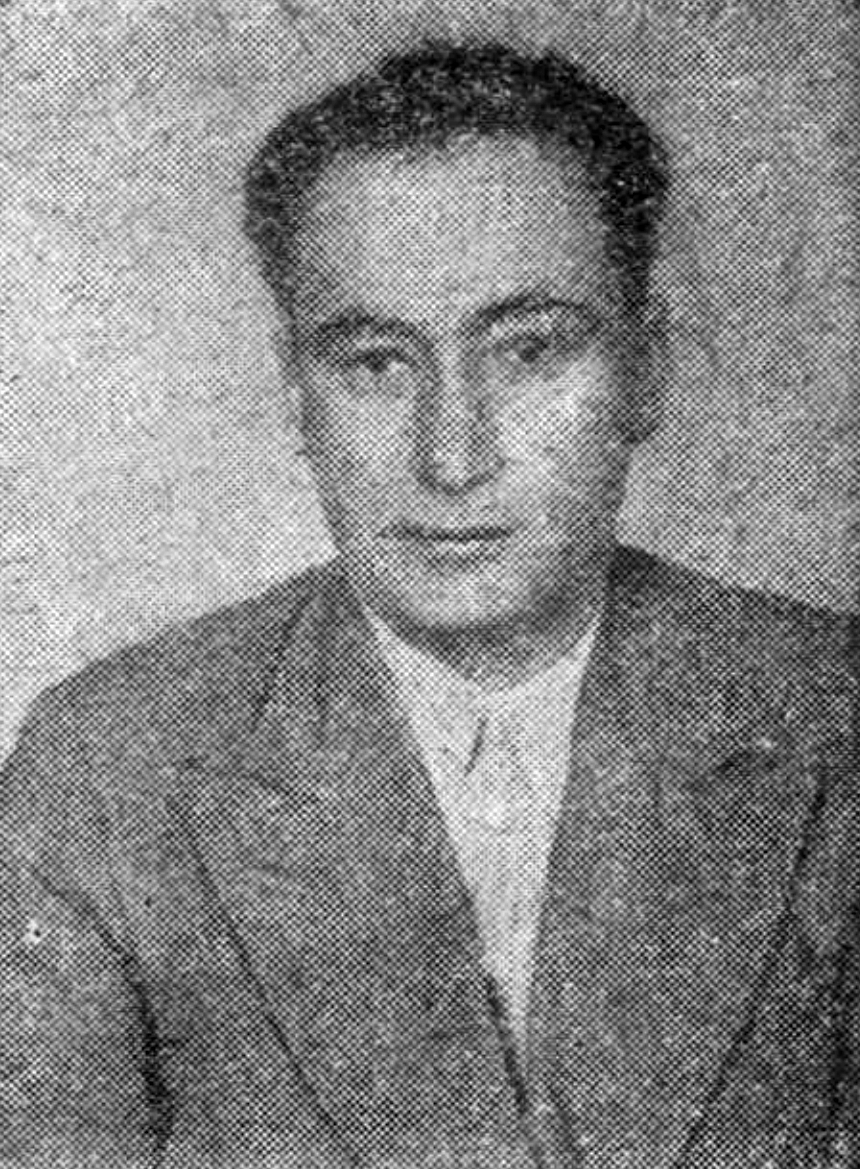
- Arutinov in 1938

First Secretary of the Communist Party of the Armenian SSR
- In office 24 September 1937 – 28 November 1953
- Preceded by: Amatuni Amatuni
- Succeeded by: Suren Tovmasyan

Personal details
- Born: Grigory Artemievich Arutinov; 7 November 1900 Telavi, Tiflis Governorate, Russian Empire
- Died: 9 November 1957 (aged 57) Tbilisi, Georgian SSR, Soviet Union
- Party: CPSU / Communist Party of Armenia
- Occupation: politician

Grigory Artemievich Arutinov (Note: Though Arutinov signed his surname Arutinov (Арутинов) on all documents, contemporary Armenian sources used the standard Armenian form Harutyunyan (Հարությունյան). Some sources use the spelling Arutyunov (Арутюнов).) or Grigor Artemi Harutyunyan (Armenian: Գրիգոր Արտեմի Հարությունյան (Հարությունով), Russian: Григорий Артемьевич Арутинов; 7 November 1900 – 9 November 1957) was the First Secretary of the Communist Party of the Armenian SSR from 24 September 1937 to 12 March 1953. His tenure as first secretary was the longest in the history of the Armenian SSR.

== Early life and career ==
Arutinov was born in Telavi, Russian Empire into the family of a small merchant and a winegrower. In 1911 he entered the Russian gymnasium in Telavi. He joined the Russian Social Democratic Labor Party (Bolsheviks) in 1919 and was arrested by the Georgian authorities in 1920.

With the establishment of Soviet power in Georgia, he became the head of the propaganda department of the Telavi district committee of the Communist Party of Georgia. In 1922 he was sent to study in Moscow, at the Karl Marx Moscow Institute of the National Economy. In 1924 he was recalled to Georgia and held various positions in the Communist Party bureaucracy in Georgia, eventually becoming secretary of the Tiflis city party committee in 1934.

== Leader of Soviet Armenia ==
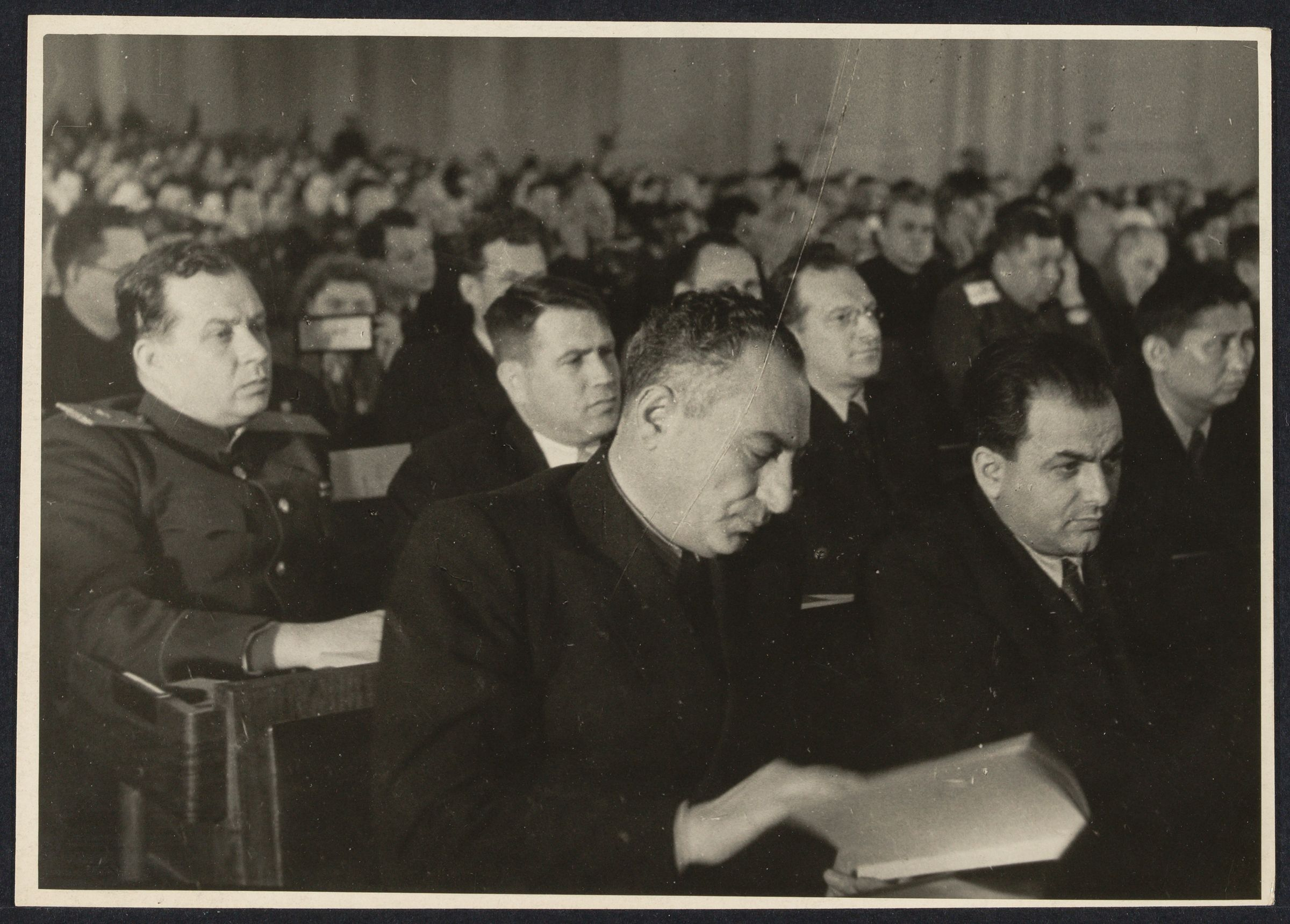
Arutinov and Aghasi Sargsyan at a session of the Supreme Soviet of the USSR, 1946

On 23 September 1937, at the evening session of an extraordinary plenum of the Central Committee of the Communist Party of Armenia, Arutinov was elected first secretary of the Central Committee of the Communist Party of Armenia. At the same session, Arutinov's predecessor, Amatuni Amatuni, was arrested by Georgy Malenkov. Arutinov was recommended to the position by his boss within the Georgian party structure, Lavrentiy Beria. Arutinov had never lived in Armenia before nor did he know the Armenian language. His brother Sergo and brother-in-law Artyom Geurkov were both victims of the Great Purge.

During Arutinov's tenure Armenia saw considerable agricultural and industrial expansion, with the capital Yerevan in particular enjoying significant growth and development. The Armenian National Academy of Sciences was founded and the construction of the main building of Matenadaran began. After the Great Patriotic War, some 100,000 Armenians living in the Armenian diaspora immigrated to Soviet Armenia, although some were settled not in Armenia but in Siberia. In November 1945, Arutinov unsuccessfully appealed to Joseph Stalin to transfer Armenian-majority Nagorno-Karabakh, which was part of the Azerbaijan SSR, to Soviet Armenia.

In 1949, under the orders of the Ministry of State Security of the USSR, approximately 12,000 people were forcibly resettled from Armenia to the Altai Krai. After the death of Stalin in 1953, the Central Committee of the Communist Party of Armenia passed a decision to allow the survivors of the deportation to return to Armenia.

After Lavrentiy Beria's arrest in June 1953, Arutinov came under fierce criticism in Armenia due to his association with Beria. At the meeting of the Armenian Central Committee plenum of November 1953, he was removed from the post of the first secretary and replaced by Suren Tovmasyan on the recommendation of Pyotr Pospelov.

After being removed from his post, Arutinov served as chairman of a sovkhoz near Ejmiatsin. He died of a heart attack in Tbilisi in the Georgian SSR on 9 November 1957.

== Personal life ==
Arutinov was married to Nina Geurkova. They had no children, but adopted Nami Geurkova, the daughter of Nina's brother Artyom Geurkov, who "committed suicide under the threat of NKVD arrest in October 1937." Nami Geurkova married Alexey Mikoyan, son of Anastas Mikoyan, and was the mother of Russian musician Stas Namin.

== Bibliography ==
- Goff, Krista A. (2020). Nested Nationalism: Making and Unmaking Nations in the Soviet Caucasus. Ithaca, NY: Cornell University Press. ISBN 978-1-5017-5327-5.
- Hambardzumyan, Viktor, ed. (1980). "Հարությունյան (Հարությունով), Գրիգոր Արտեմի". Soviet Armenian Encyclopedia (in Armenian). Vol. 6. Yerevan: Armenian Academy of Sciences.
- Panossian, Razmik (2006). The Armenians: From Kings and Priests to Merchants and Commissars. New York: Columbia University Press. ISBN 9780231139267.
- Shakarian, Pietro A. (2025). Anastas Mikoyan: An Armenian Reformer in Khrushchev's Kremlin. Bloomington: Indiana University Press. ISBN 978-0253073556.
