= List of ambassadors of Russia to Algeria =

Ambassador of the Russian Federation to the People's Democratic Republic of Algeria
- Emblem of the Russian Foreign Ministry
- Incumbent; Aleksey Solomatin since 15 January 2025
- Ministry of Foreign Affairs; Embassy of Russia in Algiers
- Style: His Excellency; The Honourable
- Reports to: Minister of Foreign Affairs
- Seat: Algiers
- Appointer: President of Russia
- Term length: At the pleasure of the president
- Website: Embassy of Russia in Algeria

The ambassador extraordinary and plenipotentiary of the Russian Federation to the People's Democratic Republic of Algeria is the official representative of the president and the government of the Russian Federation to the president and the government of Algeria.

The ambassador and his staff work at large in the Embassy of Russia in Algiers. There is a consulate general in Annaba. The post of Russian ambassador to Algeria is currently held by Aleksey Solomatin, incumbent since 15 January 2025.

== History of diplomatic relations ==
Diplomatic relations between the Soviet Union and Algeria were established on 23 March 1962. Aleksandr Abramov was appointed ambassador on 11 November 1962. With the dissolution of the Soviet Union in 1991, the Soviet ambassador, Aleksandr Aksenyonok, continued as representative of the Russian Federation until 1995.

== List of representatives (1962–present) ==
=== Soviet Union to Algeria (1962–1991) ===
Name	Title	Appointment	Termination	Notes
Aleksandr Abramov	Ambassador	11 November 1962	18 January 1964	
Nikolai Pegov	Ambassador	18 January 1964	20 June 1967	
Dmitry Shevlyagin	Ambassador	7 February 1968	30 November 1969	
Sergey Gruzinov	Ambassador	8 May 1970	10 April 1975	
Vasily Rykov	Ambassador	10 April 1975	21 January 1983	
Vasily Taratuta	Ambassador	9 April 1983	19 February 1991	
Aleksandr Aksenyonok	Ambassador	19 February 1991	25 December 1991	

=== Russian Federation to Algeria (1991–present) ===
Name	Title	Appointment	Termination	Notes
Aleksandr Aksenyonok	Ambassador	25 December 1991	4 September 1995	
Valery Yegoshkin	Ambassador	4 September 1995	31 December 1999	
Sergey Vershinin	Ambassador	31 December 1999	8 December 2003	
Vladimir Titorenko	Ambassador	8 December 2003	15 February 2007	
Alexander Yegorov	Ambassador	15 February 2007	15 November 2011	
Aleksandr Zolotov	Ambassador	15 November 2011	10 July 2017	
Igor Belyayev	Ambassador	10 July 2017	27 May 2022	
Valerian Shuvaev	Ambassador	27 May 2022	3 July 2024	Died in office
Aleksey Solomatin	Ambassador	15 January 2025		
