= Alexei Yegorov =

Alexei Yegorov may refer to:

- Alexei Yegorovich Yegorov (c. 1776–1851), Russian painter
- Alexander Yegorov (general) (1883–1939), Soviet military commander and Marshal of the Soviet Union
- Alexander Valentinovich Yegorov (born 1951), Russian diplomat and ambassador
- Aleksei Yegorov (jurist) (born 1969), Belarusian jurist
- Alexey Yegorov (born 1975), Kazakhstani-Russian swimmer
- Alexei Yegorov (ice hockey, born 1975), Russian ice hockey player who played in the National Hockey League for the San Jose Sharks
- Alexei Yegorov (ice hockey, born 1976), Russian ice hockey goaltender who plays in the Kontinental Hockey League
- Alexey Egorov, Russian boxer
