= List of ambassadors of Russia to Libya =

Ambassador of the Russian Federation to the State of Libya
- سفارة روسيا الاتحادية لدى دولة ليبيا
- Emblem of the Russian Foreign Ministry

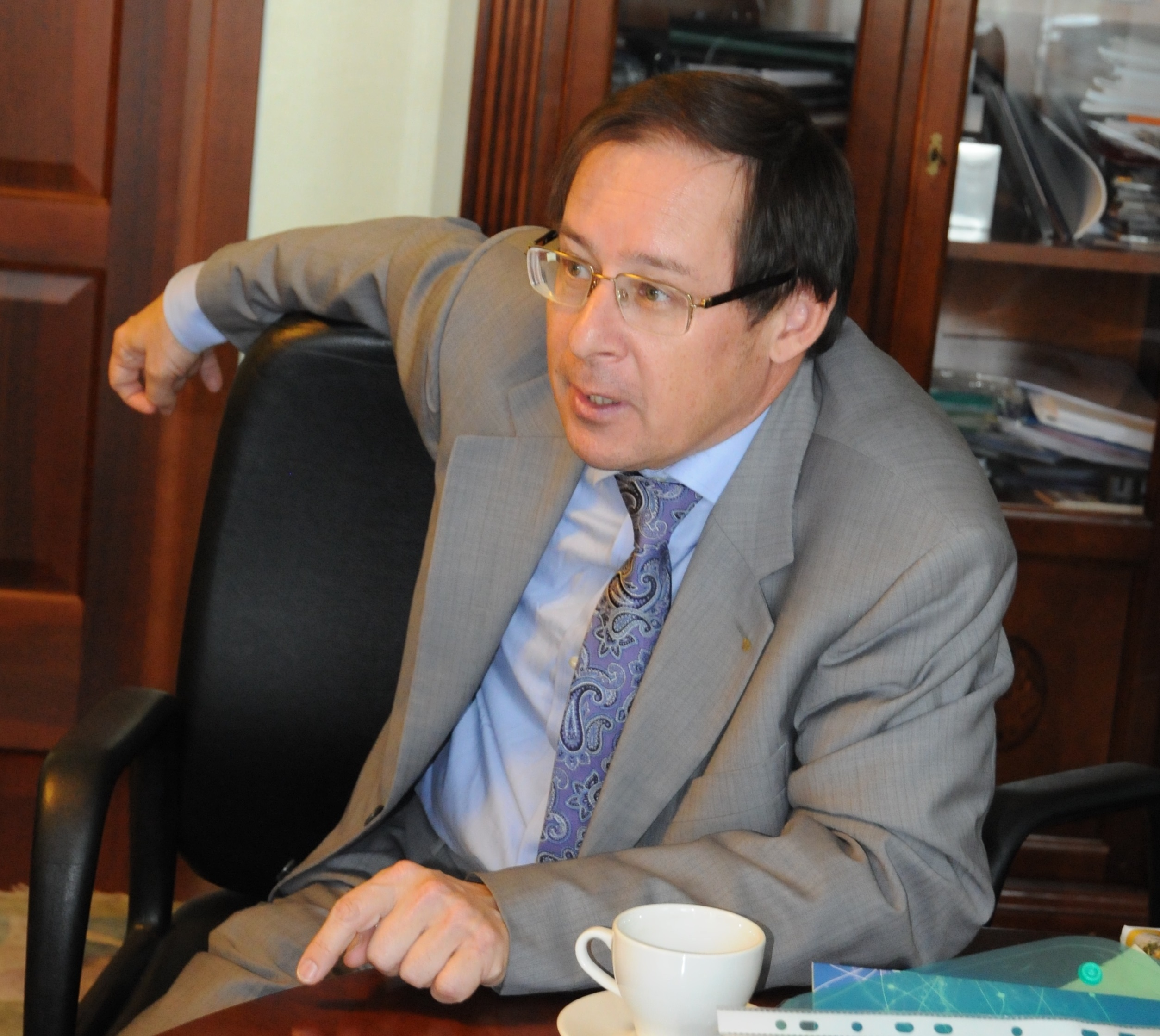
- Incumbent; Aydar Aganin since 29 December 2022
- Ministry of Foreign Affairs; Embassy of Russia in Tripoli
- Style: His Excellency; The Honourable
- Reports to: Minister of Foreign Affairs
- Seat: Tripoli
- Appointer: President of Russia
- Term length: At the pleasure of the president
- Website: Embassy of Russia in Libya

The ambassador extraordinary and plenipotentiary of the Russian Federation to Libya is the official representative of the president and the government of the Russian Federation to the president and the government of Libya.

The ambassador and his staff work at large in the Embassy of Russia in Tripoli. The post of Russian ambassador to Libya is currently held by Aydar Aganin, incumbent since 29 December 2022.

== History of diplomatic relations ==
The Soviet Union established diplomatic relations with the Kingdom of Libya on 4 September 1955. The first ambassador, Nikolai Generalov, was appointed on 15 December 1955. Following the 1969 Libyan revolution, which overthrew the king and brought Muammar Gaddafi to power on 1 September 1969, the Soviet Union recognised the Libyan Arab Republic on 4 September. Relations were maintained through several changes of name, to the Socialist People's Libyan Arab Jamahiriya in 1977, and the Great Socialist People's Libyan Arab Jamahiriya in 1986. Following the dissolution of the Soviet Union in 1991, Libya recognised the Russian Federation as its successor state, and the incumbent Soviet ambassador, Veniamin Popov, continued in post as the Russian ambassador until 1992.

Russia maintained a diplomatic presence during the Libyan civil war which broke out in 2011, but the subsequent outbreak of factional violence made the security situation untenable. The Russian embassy was attacked on 2 October 2013, and the following day all of its staff were evacuated to Tunis. The ambassador, Ivan Molotkov, remained nominally in post until 2018, but thereafter diplomatic affairs were handled through the Russian embassy in Tunis, with a temporary chargé d'affaires heading up the mission between 2018 and 2023. With the stabilising of the security situation by the early 2020s, Russia reopened its embassy in Tripoli in August 2023, with Aydar Aganin appointed as the new ambassador on 29 December 2022. Plans were also announced to reopen the consulate in Benghazi, but have been delayed until an agreement can be reached with the Government of National Stability, which controls eastern Libya.

== List of representatives (1955–present) ==
=== Soviet Union to the Kingdom of Libya (1955–1969) ===
Name	Title	Appointment	Termination	Notes
Nikolai Generalov	Ambassador	15 December 1955	18 October 1959	Presented credentials on 13 January 1956
Dmitry Zaikin	Ambassador	18 October 1959	6 April 1965	Presented credentials on 5 November 1959
Suren Tovmasyan	Ambassador	6 April 1965	1 September 1969	Presented credentials on 10 May 1965

=== Soviet Union to the Libyan Arab Republic (Note: Renamed the Socialist People's Libyan Arab Jamahiriya in 1977, and the Great Socialist People's Libyan Arab Jamahiriya in 1986.) (1969–1991) ===
Name	Title	Appointment	Termination	Notes
Suren Tovmasyan	Ambassador	1 September 1969	14 February 1970	
Ivan Yakushin	Ambassador	14 February 1970	31 August 1977	Presented credentials on 11 March 1970
Anatoly Anisimov	Ambassador	31 August 1977	4 September 1984	Presented credentials on 5 November 1977
Oleg Peresypkin	Ambassador	4 September 1984	19 September 1986	Presented credentials on 18 October 1984
Pogos Akopov	Ambassador	19 September 1986	18 March 1991	
Veniamin Popov	Ambassador	18 March 1991	25 December 1991	

=== Russian Federation to the Great Socialist People's Libyan Arab Jamahiriya (1991–2011) ===
Name	Title	Appointment	Termination	Notes
Veniamin Popov	Ambassador	25 December 1991	31 December 1992	
Aleksey Podtserob	Ambassador	31 December 1992	23 August 1996	
Sergey Bukin	Ambassador	23 August 1996	26 December 2000	
Sergei Kirpichenko	Ambassador	26 December 2000	13 February 2004	
Valerian Shuvaev	Ambassador	13 February 2004	16 October 2008	
Vladimir Chamov	Ambassador	16 October 2008	19 March 2011	

=== Russian Federation to the State of Libya (2011–present) ===
Name	Title	Appointment	Termination	Notes
Ivan Molotkov	Ambassador	30 January 2012	26 November 2018	Left Libya on 3 October 2013; Diplomatic affairs handled through the embassy in Tunis
Dzhamshed Boltayev	Chargé d'affaires	November 2018	March 2023	Based at the embassy in Tunis
Aydar Aganin	Ambassador	29 December 2022		Presented credentials on 26 June 2023
