= Vladimir Yegorov =

Vladimir Yegorov or Egorov (Russian: Владимир Егоров) may refer to:

- Vladimir Yegorov (politician, born 1938) (died 2022), Russian admiral and governor
- Vladimir Egorov (wrestler) (born 1995), Macedonian wrestler
- Vladimir Yegorov (politician, born 1947), Russian Minister of Culture, 1998–2000
- Vladimir Egorov (draughts player) (born 1989), a Draughts-64 World Championship medalist
- Soviet submarine tender Vladimir Yegorov, an Ugra-class submarine tender
