= Vladimir Vinogradov (diplomat) =

Soviet diplomat (1921–1997)

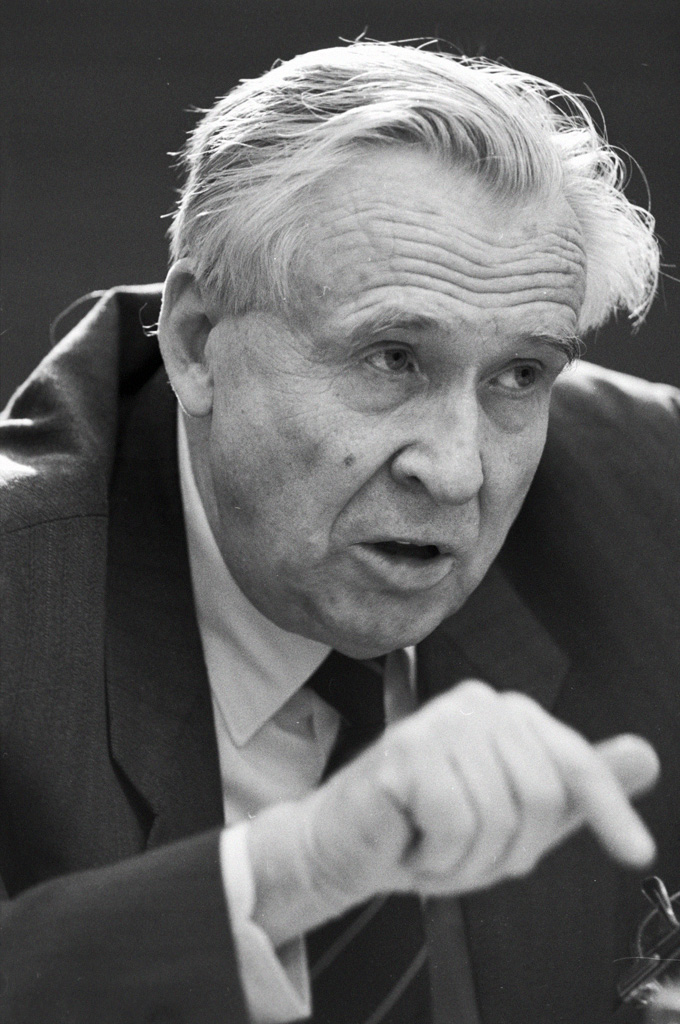

Vladimir Mikhailovich Vinogradov (2 August 1921 – 21 June 1997) was a prominent Soviet diplomat in the second half of the 20th century.

== Early life ==
Vinogradov was born in 1921 in Vinnytsia, Ukraine. In 1945, he earned a degree in engineering and technology in Moscow; three years later, he graduated from the All-Union Academy of Foreign Trade. After finishing his studies, he was appointed assistant to the commercial representative of the Soviet Union in London. Vinogradov returned to Moscow four years later to work in the central apparatus of the Ministry of Trade. He served as the Deputy Chief of the Department of Commerce for the next ten years, dealing mostly with western countries.

== Diplomatic career ==
From 1962 to 1966, Vinogradov was the ambassador of the USSR in Japan; he served as Ambassador to Egypt from 1970 to 1974. At the beginning of 1975, Vinogradov acted as the initiator of a rapprochement between the USSR and Jordan.

From February 1977 to April 1982, Vinogradov was the ambassador of the USSR in Iran. After this assignment, Vinogradov was appointed to the post of Minister for Foreign Affairs of the Russian Soviet Federative Socialist Republic (one of the republics of the USSR). He held this post for eight years (until 11 October 1990, being replaced by Andrei Kozyrev), continuing to actively participate in the implementation of Soviet policy in the Middle East. Vinogradov retired from his diplomatic career in 1990.

== Retirement ==
After retiring, Vinogradov maintained a high level of interest in the Middle East. In 1992, he headed the Russian Committee of Public Organizations on Assistance to the Arab-Israeli settlement. Through this structure, many informal contacts of Moscow with political figures of the countries of the Middle East were carried out in the 1990s. Vinogradov participated in them very actively, from time to time advising diplomats of the official position of post-Soviet Russia on various regional questions.
