= Vladimir Polyakov (diplomat) =

Russian diplomat

Vladimir Porfiryevich Polyakov (Russian: Владимир Порфирьевич Поляков, 5 March 1931 – 16 June 2002) was a Soviet diplomat who served as Soviet ambassador to Egypt as well as Soviet Vice-Minister of Foreign Affairs.

He served as Soviet Ambassador to Egypt from 1974 until he was expelled by Egyptian President Anwar Sadat in September 1981. In 1983-1990 he served as head of the Middle East section of the Soviet Ministry of Foreign Affairs. From 1990 to 1995, served again as Ambassador to Egypt.
