= Alexander Egorov (artist) =

Russian painter

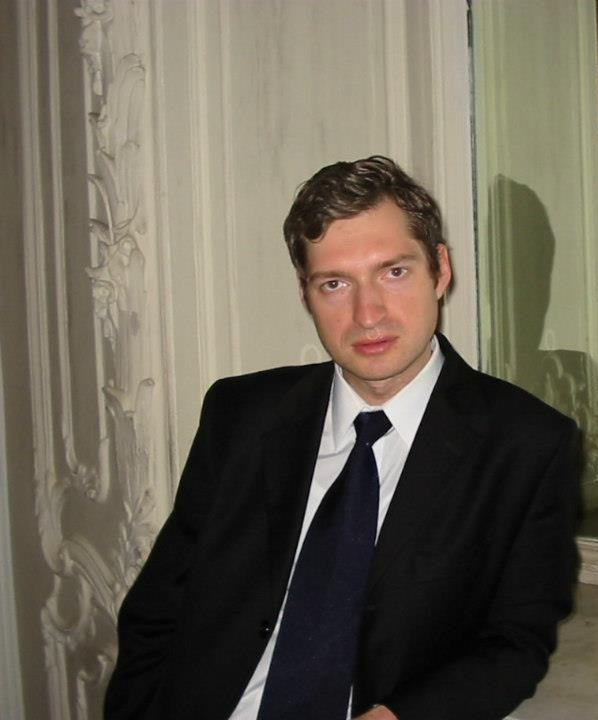
- Born: Alexander Viktorovich Egorov; September 19, 1967; Kropotkin, Russian SFSR, Soviet Union
- Known for: Painting, Drawing, Photography, Sculpture, Writing, Videoart, Shadow Theatre, Designer
- Movement: Symbolism

Alexander Viktorovich Egorov (Russian: Александр Викторович Егоров; born 19 September 1967) is a Russian artist and painter.

== Biography ==
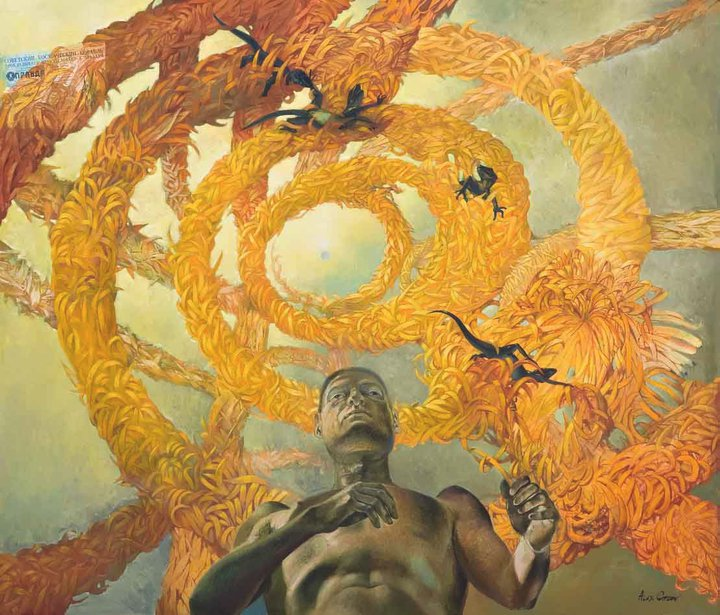
Are we more than the sum of our parts?. Oil on Canvas.

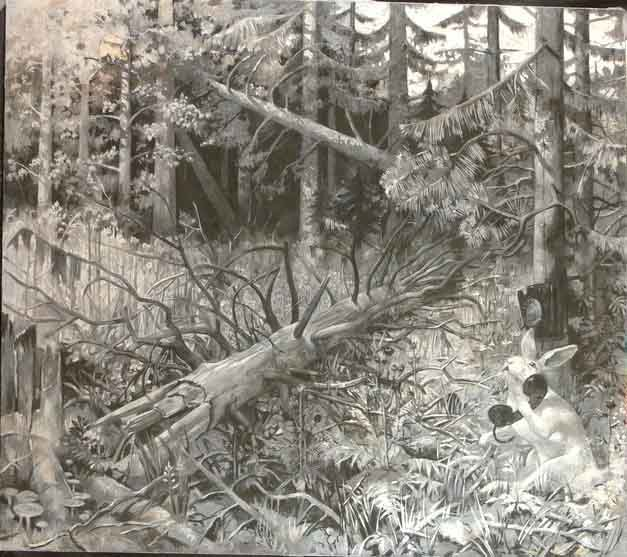
Talking in the forest, Mixed techniques on canvas, 2005

Alexander Egorov was born in 1967 in the city Kropotkin, Russia.

Following his graduation from the Moscow Art College and Moscow University of Art In 1992, Alexander subsequently enrolled in the Union of Artists at UNESCO and took part in regular expositions of this Union.

In 1993 the Union Gallery exhibitions were shown in several capital towns in Cyprus. As a result of these exhibitions, Alexander’s Moscow collection became influenced with the imagery of the antiquity he observed built by the invading crusaders.

His creative work has developed with a sense of theme whilst at the same time echoing symbolic realism and combining an Art Nouveau artistic flavor influenced from his art education in Kalinin Moscow Art academy (1982-1987).

Fantastical symbolism and the depiction of biblical plots were the central themes of his two exhibitions in 1995 and 1996. The paintings attracted considerable media attention. A critic wrote:-

''... Alexander Egorov's canvas The Wind from the North is extremely interesting. This perfect fantasy canvas is characterized by a mystic northern light. The artist dexterously presents us with the images of elephants, plodding through the ice and travelers with a spyglass.'' - Nash Izograf. Nonna Сristy.

The artist has depicted his own dreams. One of the paintings, entitled Grossbayer, depicts the a struggle between two worlds: one big and merciful and the other small and malicious... - Sobesednik. Nikolai Fokht.

In 1995 at the Golden Paintbrush competition, held in the Central House of Artists, Alexander was awarded a prize for the triptych Flowers, dedicated to the Great Patriotic War.

The following year his hyper realistic floral works were displayed in the Department of the Corps Diplomatique at the request of the ambassador of Ecuador Juan Salazara Sancisi. The exhibition was dedicated to the 124th anniversary of the Battle of Pichins.

In 1999 Alexander created a collection of still lives under the title "Vanitas" for an annual exhibition at Art Manege, entitled 'The Eurasian Zone' and the floral theme was put aside for the moment . The period between 1999 and 2002 was characterized by a return to the Art Nouveau style.

During this period he was commissioned to create a work for John Nilson, a London auctioneer. This commission consisted in a series botanical illustrations, a new interpretation of a style popularized in the Victorian epoch. The small illustrations bound in botanical atlases were shown to the Moscow public at a private exhibition entitled “'The Nectar”.

This personal exhibition, held in the Central House of Artists, consisted of works created at different times but conjoined by a floral theme. The journalist Aidiniyn writing for Culture:- ... The new exposition has a spacious atmosphere. All the works are large in proportion, there are enormous and yet delicate yellow flowers sharply contrasted against the backdrop of black fields. On the opposite wall, there are fragile dew drops which slither down soft petals. The artist has the ability to be receptive to the nature of an object whilst at the same time not losing a certain traditional decorativeness.

Alexander took part in the restoration of the Cathedral in Rostov and the Church of St. Nicolas the Miracle Worker in the town of Gukovo.

In 1989 he set up an art studio for children aged 5 to 7. The studio produced some very interesting pictures which were exhibited in venues as diverse as - The art gallery «Na Kashirke», the House of Peace, the German embassy, the Union of Artists on Gogolevskiy boulevard, the Central House of Artists. Recently, Alexanders works have achieved commercial success and are to be found in the collections of: Ugo Tognazzi (Italy), Konstantin Orbelyan (USA), Victor Tretiakov (Russia), Johelio Bregolat (Spain), Ergan Anderson (Sweden), Richard Bamfort (England), Davenport (England), Tugrul Erkin (Turkey), Brent Bistley (the USA), Vladimir Tatarinzev (Russia), Manfred Hyterer (Germany) as well as in the galleries of various countries.

In 2008 the International Academy of Culture and Art has awarded Alexander Egorov by the Silver Star Order "Service for the Art".

Since 1999 A. Egorov regularly takes part in the International Art Fairs in London, Beijing, Guangzhou, Strasbourg, Moscow and other cities.

== Exhibitions ==
- 1990 - 19th Young Artist's Exposition, House of Artists - Kuznetzky Most
- 1993 - Solo Exhibition at Union Gallery
- 1993 - Gallery Artland, Nicosia, Cyprus
- 1994 - The First Performance Festival "In the realm of solid ice", Fenix Gallery
- 1995 - "Spirit and Soil", Gallery "Na Kashirke"
- 1995 - "Moscow Country Club", Gallery Crosno
- 1995 - "Extremism and Erotic", Culture Centre of Eduard Limonov
- 1995 - "Golden Paintbrush" Central Artist's House in Moscow
- 1996 - "The House of Friendship" "174 anniversary of the Battle of Pichintse"
- 1997 - "St.art 97" Strasburg, France
- 1999 - ArtManezh "Eurasian area"
- 2000 - Charity auction to assist an orphanage №28 in Moscow
- 2001 - "Flower's Juice", personal exhibition, Central House of Artists in Moscow
- 2003 - Exposition at "Defile" Club in Moscow
- 2005 - ArtSalon at Central House of Artists
- 2005 - "Bombay in Pictures", The British Embassy in Moscow
- 2006 - "Frog Wedding", personal exposition at Central House of Artists
- 2007 - "Pictorial Russian School", Harbin, China
- 2007 - "Inspired Art Fair", London
- 2007 - "Mos Kwa", Exposition at Zoo in Moscow
- 2007 - "Portrait", Central House of Artists in Moscow
- 2008 - Annual Exhibition of the Russian Union of Artists, Yaroslavl, Russia
- 2008 - Solo Exhibition at Gallery Han Jian Ming, Harbin, China
- 2009 - Russian-Art-Fair, London
- 2009 - "Hypostasis", solo exhibition at West-Eleven Gallery in Notting Hill, London
- 2010 - "Act of persecutions", solo Exhibition at Moscow Museum of Glinka Musical Culture
- 2010 - «Indochina", Gallery "ART - PRO", Jubilee city, Moscow region
- 2011 - "Symbolism and Realism with Russian Villages", Art Gallery #64 in Guangzhou
- 2013 - Design of Chocolate for Russian Ballet music Project made by C&G Cioccolato e Gelato and APS in Catania
- 2013 - Bronze Statuette by Sergei Rachmaninov for S. Rachmaninov International Award in Moscow
- 2014 - "Somewhere in Asia" exhibition at Central House of Artists
- 2015 - Arte Laguna Prize - Finalist exhibition at Nappe Arsenale of Venice, Italy
- 2016 - Exhibition "Art Academy of Alexander Egorov" at the Central House of Artists in Moscow, Russia

== Awards ==
- The Silver Star Order "Service for the Art".
- The special prize at the «Golden Paintbrush» competition 1995.
- The Diplom of Accademia of Art by Z.Tsereteli
- The Diplom "The Golden Brush" of the International Academy of Art and Culture
- Arte Laguna Prize 2015 - Artist in Residence in Venice: SERIGRAFIA ARTISTICA - FALLANI

== Honours ==
- The corresponding member of the International Academy of Culture and Art.
- The member of the Union of Artists at UNESCO
