= Yegorova, Krasnovishersky District, Perm Krai =

Yegorova Егорова
- Village
- Location within Perm Krai Location within Russia
- Coordinates: 60°01′N 57°39′E
- Country: Russia
- Region: Perm Krai
- District: Krasnovishersky District
- Time zone: UTC+5:00

Yegorova (Russian: Егорова) is a rural locality (a village) in Krasnovishersky District, Perm Krai, Russia. The population was 2 as of 2010.

== Geography ==
Yegorova is located 64 km southeast of Krasnovishersk (the district's administrative centre) by road. Simanova is the nearest rural locality.
