= Sergei Kirpichenko =

Russian diplomat (1951–2019)

- Сергей Кирпиченко

Ambassador of Russia to Egypt
- In office 7 September 2011 – 2 September 2019
- President: Dmitry Medvedev (2011–2012); Vladimir Putin (2012–2019)
- Preceded by: Mikhail Bogdanov
- Succeeded by: Georgy Borisenko

Ambassador of Russia to Syria
- In office 1 December 2006 – 7 September 2011
- Preceded by: Robert Markaryan
- Succeeded by: Azamat Kulmukhametov

Ambassador of Russia to Libya
- In office 26 December 2000 – 13 February 2004
- Preceded by: Sergei Bukin
- Succeeded by: Valerian Shuvaev

Ambassador of Russia to the United Arab Emirates
- In office 30 January 1998 – 30 November 2000
- Preceded by: Oleg Derkovskiy
- Succeeded by: Sergei Yakovlev

Personal details
- Born: Sergei Vadimovich Kirpichenko; 13 August 1951 Soviet Union
- Died: 2 September 2019 (aged 68) Cairo, Egypt
- Parent(s): Vadim Kirpichenko, Valeriya Kirpichenko
- Education: Moscow State Institute of International Relations
- Awards: Order of Honour; Order of Friendship

Sergei Vadimovich Kirpichenko (Russian: Сергей Вадимович Кирпиченко; 13 August 1951 – 2 September 2019) was a Russian diplomat. He served as ambassador to various countries during the 1990s until the 2010s, and at the time of his death was the incumbent Ambassador to Egypt.

Born the son of an intelligence officer and an orientalist, Kirpichenko studied at the Moscow State Institute of International Relations, and began his career with positions in Soviet embassies in the Middle East, including Syria, Jordan and Saudi Arabia. He rose through the diplomatic ranks, becoming envoy extraordinary and minister plenipotentiary first class in 1996, and in 1998 he took up the post of Ambassador of Russia to the United Arab Emirates. He served as Ambassador to Libya from 2002, and to Syria from 2006, being appointed full Ambassador Extraordinary and Plenipotentiary in 2007. In 2011 he became Ambassador to Egypt.

Kirpichenko held this post until his death in 2019, during which time he played a role in Egypt–Russia relations, over a period which included renewed Russian investment in Egypt, the loss of Metrojet Flight 9268 while flying from Egypt to Russia, and the sale to Egypt of the French-built Mistral-class amphibious assault ships originally intended for Russia. He received several awards during his service, including the Order of Honour and the Order of Friendship.

== Family and early life ==
Kirpichenko was born in the Soviet Union on 13 August 1951. His parents had connections with Africa and Asia; his father, Vadim Alexseyevich, was an intelligence officer with the Soviet military, reaching the rank of general-lieutenant. He had worked for the Eastern Department of the First Chief Directorate of the KGB, serving in Egypt as a deputy resident, and later as resident in Tunisia. Sergei's mother, Valeriya Nikolaevna, was a literary orientalist and critic. Sergei Kirpichenko studied at the Moscow State Institute of International Relations, graduating from the Department of International Relations in 1973, and joining the Russian Ministry of Foreign Affairs. He went on to work in various positions in the Ministry of Foreign Affairs, both as part of the USSR, and then the Russian Federation. From 1973 until 1975 he was attached to the embassy in Syria, followed by the embassy in Jordan from 1983 until 1988.

== Senior diplomatic postings ==
From 1991 to 1995 Kirpichenko was Counselor-Envoy at the Soviet, and then Russian embassy in Saudi Arabia, and then from 1995 until 1998 he was First Deputy Director of the Department of the Middle East and North Africa at the Ministry of Foreign Affairs. Over his career he learned to speak Arabic, English and French. From 16 October 1992 he held the diplomatic rank of envoy extraordinary and minister plenipotentiary second class, rising to envoy extraordinary and minister plenipotentiary first class on 18 September 1996. He was appointed to the rank of Ambassador Extraordinary and Plenipotentiary on 6 February 2007.

On 30 January 1998 Boris Yeltsin appointed Kirpichenko Ambassador to the United Arab Emirates. He held this post until 30 November 2000, when he was relieved by President Vladimir Putin. He was then appointed Ambassador to Libya on 26 December 2000, and served as such until 13 February 2004. Between 2004 and 2006 he was on "special assignments" with the Foreign Ministry. During this period, on 27 October 2004, he spoke on the subject of "identity in views between Egypt and Russia regarding the Iraqi issue." His next appointment was as Ambassador to Syria, from 1 December 2006 until 7 September 2011. In August 2012, during the Syrian Civil War, a hoax Twitter account purporting to be that of Russian Interior Minister Vladimir Kolokoltsev reported that Syrian President Bashar al-Assad had been killed or wounded, supposedly quoting Kirpichenko. Both the Interior Ministry and the embassy denied the report, which had briefly affected oil markets.

Kirpichenko was immediately appointed ambassador to Egypt on 7 September 2011, a post he held concurrently as part-time plenipotentiary to the League of Arab States. His tenure included renewed Russian investment in Egypt, the loss of Metrojet Flight 9268 while flying from Egypt to Russia, and the sale to Egypt of the French-built Mistral-class amphibious assault ships originally intended for Russia. In 2018 he attended the International Conference on Russian-Egyptian Relations, held at the Egyptian National Library and Archives, marking 75 years since the establishment of diplomatic relations. He was also present at the unveiling of a bust of former Prime Minister of Russia Yevgeny Primakov by Rustam Minnikhanov at the Russian Cultural Centre in Cairo in October that year to mark the anniversary. This was not the first unveiling of a bust of a prominent Russian figure that Kirpichenko had attended, having been present at the unveiling of one of Yuri Gagarin at the planetarium of the Bibliotheca Alexandrina in 2014.

== Death ==
Kirpichenko died in hospital in Cairo on the morning of 2 September 2019 at the age of 68. His death was announced by the Ministry of Foreign Affairs, who described him as "a talented diplomat and reliable comrade". The Russian flag at the Cairo embassy was lowered to half-mast. He was married, with a son and daughter, both of whom work for the Foreign Ministry. Ahmed Hafez, spokesman for the Egyptian Ministry of Foreign Affairs, expressed condolences. Iranian Foreign Minister Mohammad Javad Zarif also expressed his condolences to his Russian counterpart Sergey Lavrov during his visit to Moscow. The embassy in Cairo announced that a book of condolence would be open for members of the public to sign on 4 and 5 September.

== Awards ==
Over his career he was awarded the Order of Honour on 8 February 2019, and the Order of Friendship on 26 November 2011, both for his "great contribution to the implementation of the foreign policy of the Russian Federation and many years of conscientious service".
