= Yegorova, Kudymkarsky District, Perm Krai =

Yegorova Егорова
- Village
- Location within Perm Krai Location within Russia
- Coordinates: 59°15′N 54°42′E
- Country: Russia
- Region: Perm Krai
- District: Kudymkarsky District
- Time zone: UTC+5:00

Yegorova (Russian: Егорова) is a rural locality (a village) in Oshibskoye Rural Settlement, Kudymkarsky District, Perm Krai, Russia. The population was 216 as of 2010. There are 7 streets.

== Geography ==
Yegorova is located 34 km north of Kudymkar (the district's administrative centre) by road. Malakhova is the nearest rural locality.
