= List of ambassadors of Russia to Egypt =

Ambassador of the Russian Federation to Egypt
- سفير روسيا في مصر
- Emblem of the Russian Foreign Ministry
- Incumbent; Georgy Borisenko since 27 April 2020
- Ministry of Foreign Affairs; Embassy of Russia in Cairo
- Style: His Excellency; The Honourable
- Reports to: Minister of Foreign Affairs
- Seat: Cairo
- Appointer: President of Russia
- Term length: At the pleasure of the president
- Formation: 1783
- First holder: Kondraty von Tonus
- Website: Embassy of Russia in Cairo

The ambassador of Russia to Egypt is the official representative of the president and the government of the Russian Federation to the president and the government of Egypt.

The ambassador and his staff work at large in the Russian Embassy in Cairo. There are consulates-general in Alexandria and Hurghada, as well as a trade mission and cultural centre based in Cairo, and a second cultural centre in Alexandria. The ambassador to Egypt is concurrently appointed as the Russian representative to the Arab League.

The current incumbent Russian ambassador to Egypt is Georgy Borisenko, incumbent since 27 April 2020.

== History of diplomatic relations ==
Formal diplomatic relations between the Russian Empire and the Egypt Eyalet began with the appointment of Kondraty von Tonus as Consul-general, based in Alexandria. Relations were maintained after the establishment of the Khedivate of Egypt 1867, though they were temporarily broken off on 12 April 1877 during the Russo-Turkish War. They were resumed on 1 August 1878, under the previous representative, Ivan Leks. Relations were raised to the level of envoy on 5 August 1911, during Aleksei Smirnov's period as representative. Smirnov continued to represent Russia after the fall of the Russian monarchy in the February Revolution in 1917, representing the new Russian Provisional Government. When this was overthrown by the Bolsheviks in the October Revolution later that year, Smirnov refused to recognise the new regime, and was dismissed from his post by the People's Commissar for Foreign Affairs on 9 December 1917. This marked a break in official relations between Egypt, which had been established as a British protectorate in 1914 as the Sultanate of Egypt, and the new Soviet state. Smirnov nevertheless continued to operate as envoy on behalf of Russian interests until 6 October 1923 when the newly nominally independent Kingdom of Egypt ceased to recognise the former imperial representatives.

Sporadic efforts by the Soviet Union to re-establish relations with Egypt continued over the next two decades, at first led by People's Commissar for Foreign Affairs Georgy Chicherin and Vatslav Vorovsky, the Soviet representative to Italy, and Vorovsky's successor Nikolai Iordansky. The Egyptian government remained suspicious of the Egyptian communist movement and its connections to Comintern, and little was achieved. In 1926 a fall in the world price of cotton led to economic crisis in Egypt, and in 1927 talks between Soviet and Egyptian representatives took place in Ankara concerning the reestablishment of trade links. This led to the opening of an office of Textilimport in Alexandria in 1928, the first Soviet official mission in Egypt, and one concerned with the purchase of Egyptian cotton. Evidence soon mounted that the mission's employees were also involved in propaganda activities, and the mission was expelled in 1929. However trade links grew during the 1930s, and overtures from figures in the Egyptian government to Soviet diplomatic representatives took place during the Second World War. The Egyptian ambassador in London, Hassan Pasha Nashat, met with his Soviet counterpart, Ivan Maisky, and suggested a resumption of diplomatic relations. After negotiations between the diplomats, an official approach from Egyptian Prime Minister Mostafa El-Nahas was accepted by the Soviet government, and Maisky and El-Nahas met in Alexandria to formalise relations on 26 August 1943. The announcements of the establishment of relations took place in Egypt on 7 September, and in Russia on 9 September.

The first ambassador, appointed on 14 October was Nikolai Novikov. In addition to his duties as representative to Egypt, he was also accredited to the governments-in-exile of Yugoslavia and Greece, who were based in Cairo during the occupation of their countries. Soviet representation continued during the post-war years, and after the Egyptian revolution of 1952, which formed the Arab Republic of Egypt. The status of the official representative was raised from envoy to ambassador in 1954, and continued after the formation of the United Arab Republic between Egypt and Syria on 22 February 1958. The new state had its capital in Cairo, and the former Soviet representative to Egypt, Yevgeny Kiselyov, continued as ambassador. A consulate-general was opened in Damascus in 1958, though with the secession of Syria from the Union in 1961, this was upgraded to an embassy with its own representation. Egypt continued to be known as the United Arab Republic until 1971 when it become known once more as the Arab Republic of Egypt. With the dissolution of the Soviet Union in 1991, the Soviet ambassador Vladimir Polyakov instead became the representative of the Russian Federation, and continued in post until 1995.

== List of representatives (1784–present) ==
=== Russian Empire to the Egypt Eyalet (1784–1867) ===
Name	Title	Appointment	Termination	Notes
Kondraty von Tonus	Consul-general	November 1784	1789	
Carlo Rosetti	Consul-general	1792	18..	
Giorgio Chivini	Consul-general	1818	1824	
Antonio Pezzoni	Consul-general	1826	1831	
Aleksandr Dyugamel	Consul-general	8 August 1833	12 November 1837	
Aleksandr Medem	Consul-general	1838	1841	
Yegor Kremer	Consul-general	1841	1845	
Aleksandr von Fok	Consul-general	1845	1853	
Nikolay Girs	Consul-general	1856	1858	
Aleksandr Lagovsky	Consul-general	1858	1866	

=== Russian Empire to the Khedivate of Egypt (1867–1914) ===
Name	Title	Appointment	Termination	Notes
Ivan Leks	Diplomatic agent	13 July 1868	26 January 1883	Relations suspended between 12 April 1877 and 1 August 1878 during the Russo-Turkish War
Mikhail Khitrovo	Diplomatic agent	2 March 1883	3 June 1886	
Aleksandr Koyander	Diplomatic agent	3 June 1886	1902	
Pyotr Maksimov	Diplomatic agent	1902	1905	
Aleksei Smirnov	Diplomatic agent	1905	1914	Status raised to envoy on 5 August 1911

=== Russian Empire to the Sultanate of Egypt (1914–1917) ===
Name	Title	Appointment	Termination	Notes
Aleksei Smirnov	Envoy	1914	3 March 1917	

=== Russian Provisional Government to the Sultanate of Egypt (1917) ===
Name	Title	Appointment	Termination	Notes
Aleksei Smirnov	Envoy	3 March 1917	26 October 1917	

=== Soviet Union to the Kingdom of Egypt (1943–1953) ===
Name	Title	Appointment	Termination	Notes
Nikolai Novikov	Envoy	14 October 1943	16 November 1944	
Aleksei Shchiborin	Envoy	16 November 1944	7 February 1950	
Semyon Kozyrev	Envoy	7 February 1950	18 June 1953	

=== Soviet Union to the Arab Republic of Egypt (1953–1958) ===
Name	Title	Appointment	Termination	Notes
Semyon Kozyrev	Envoy	18 June 1953	12 October 1953	
Daniel Solod	Envoy	12 October 1953	1 January 1956	Status raised to ambassador in 1954
Yevgeny Kiselyov	Ambassador	1 January 1956	22 February 1958	

=== Soviet Union to the United Arab Republic (1958–1971) ===
Name	Title	Appointment	Termination	Notes
Yevgeny Kiselyov	Ambassador	22 February 1958	6 August 1959	
Vladimir Yerofeyev	Ambassador	6 August 1959	16 June 1965	
Dmitri Pozhidaev	Ambassador	16 June 1965	29 August 1967	
Sergei Vinogradov	Ambassador	29 August 1967	27 August 1970	
Vladimir Vinogradov	Ambassador	9 October 1970	11 September 1971	

=== Soviet Union to the Arab Republic of Egypt (1971–1991) ===
Name	Title	Appointment	Termination	Notes
Vladimir Vinogradov	Ambassador	11 September 1971	4 April 1974	
Vladimir Polyakov	Ambassador	4 April 1974	27 September 1983	
Alexander Belonogov	Ambassador	7 July 1984	14 August 1986	
Gennady Zhuravlyov	Ambassador	14 August 1986	7 August 1990	
Vladimir Polyakov	Ambassador	7 August 1990	25 December 1991	

=== Russian Federation to the Arab Republic of Egypt (1991–present) ===
Name	Title	Appointment	Termination	Notes
Vladimir Polyakov	Ambassador	25 December 1991	4 July 1995	
Vladimir Gudev	Ambassador	4 July 1995	21 April 2000	
Andrey Denisov	Ambassador	21 April 2000	28 December 2001	
Nikolai Kartuzov	Ambassador	2 July 2002	9 June 2004	
Mikhail Bogdanov	Ambassador	21 January 2005	12 June 2011	
Sergei Kirpichenko	Ambassador	7 September 2011	2 September 2019	
Georgy Borisenko	Ambassador	27 April 2020	20 February 2026	
Yuri Matveev	Chargé d'Affaires	20 February 2026	incumbent	

== See also ==
- List of ambassadors of Egypt to Russia
