= Aydar Aganin =

American journalist (born 1967)

- Айдар Аганин
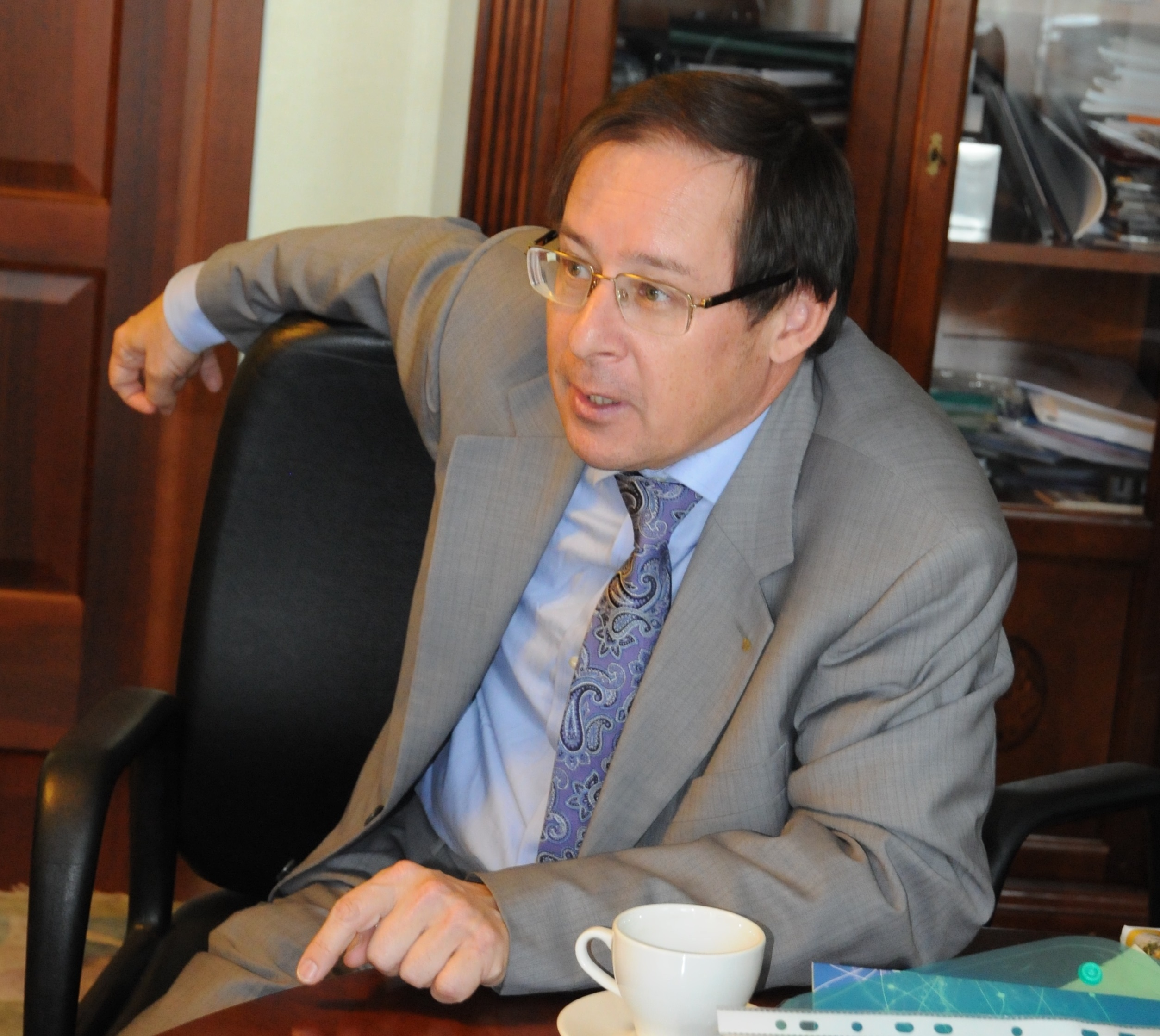
- Aganin in 2019

Ambassador of Russia to Libya
- Incumbent
- Assumed office 29 December 2022
- Preceded by: Ivan Molotkov

Personal details
- Born: 23 August 1967 (age 59) Kazan, Russian SFSR, Soviet Union
- Education: Moscow State Institute of International Relations

Aydar Rashidovich Aganin (Russian: Айдар Рашидович Аганин; born 23 August 1967) is a Russian diplomat and a former journalist.

== Biography ==
Aganin was born on 23 August 1967, in Kazan, in what was then the Russian Soviet Federative Socialist Republic of the Soviet Union. He graduated from Moscow State Institute of International Relations in 1990 and joined the Soviet Ministry of Foreign Affairs that year. He served as counselor of the Russian embassy in Jordan between 2003 and 2007, and in 2007, became Deputy Chief Editor of ANO TV-Novosti, and Director of the Arabic Broadcasting of Russia Today's Arabic news service Rusya Al-Yaum.

Between 2011 and 2016, Aganin was Senior Adviser at the Russian Embassy in the United States of America, and in 2017 until 2019 he served as head of the Russian mission to the Palestinian National Authority in Ramallah. In June 2019, he became deputy director of the Foreign Policy Planning Department of the Russian Ministry of Foreign Affairs, and received the diplomatic rank of Envoy Extraordinary and Plenipotentiary second class that month. Aganin is fluent in Russian, English, Arabic and Hebrew. He currently serves as the Russian ambassador to Libya.

== Selected publications ==
- Water Resources of the Jordan River Basin and Arab-Israeli Conflict
- Tribes and Clans of the Hashemite Kingdom of Jordan
- Modern Jordan
- Biblical Jordan
