= Alexander Valentinovich Yegorov =

Russian diplomat

Aleksandr Valentinovich Yegorov (Russian: Александр Валентинович Егоров) (born 1951) is a career diplomat and the former Ambassador Extraordinary and Plenipotentiary of the Russian Federation to the People's Democratic Republic of Algeria.

== Biography ==
Yegorov graduated from the Moscow State Institute of International Relations in 1974, and went on to work in various diplomatic posts in the central offices of the Ministry of Foreign Affairs and abroad.

On 15 February 2007, Yegorov was appointed Ambassador of Russia to Algeria.

Yegorov speaks Russian, French and Arabic.
