= Israel–Russia relations =

- Israel: Russia

Diplomatic mission
- Embassy of Israel, Moscow: Embassy of Russia, Tel Aviv

Envoy
- Ambassador Simona Halperin: Ambassador Anatoly Viktorov

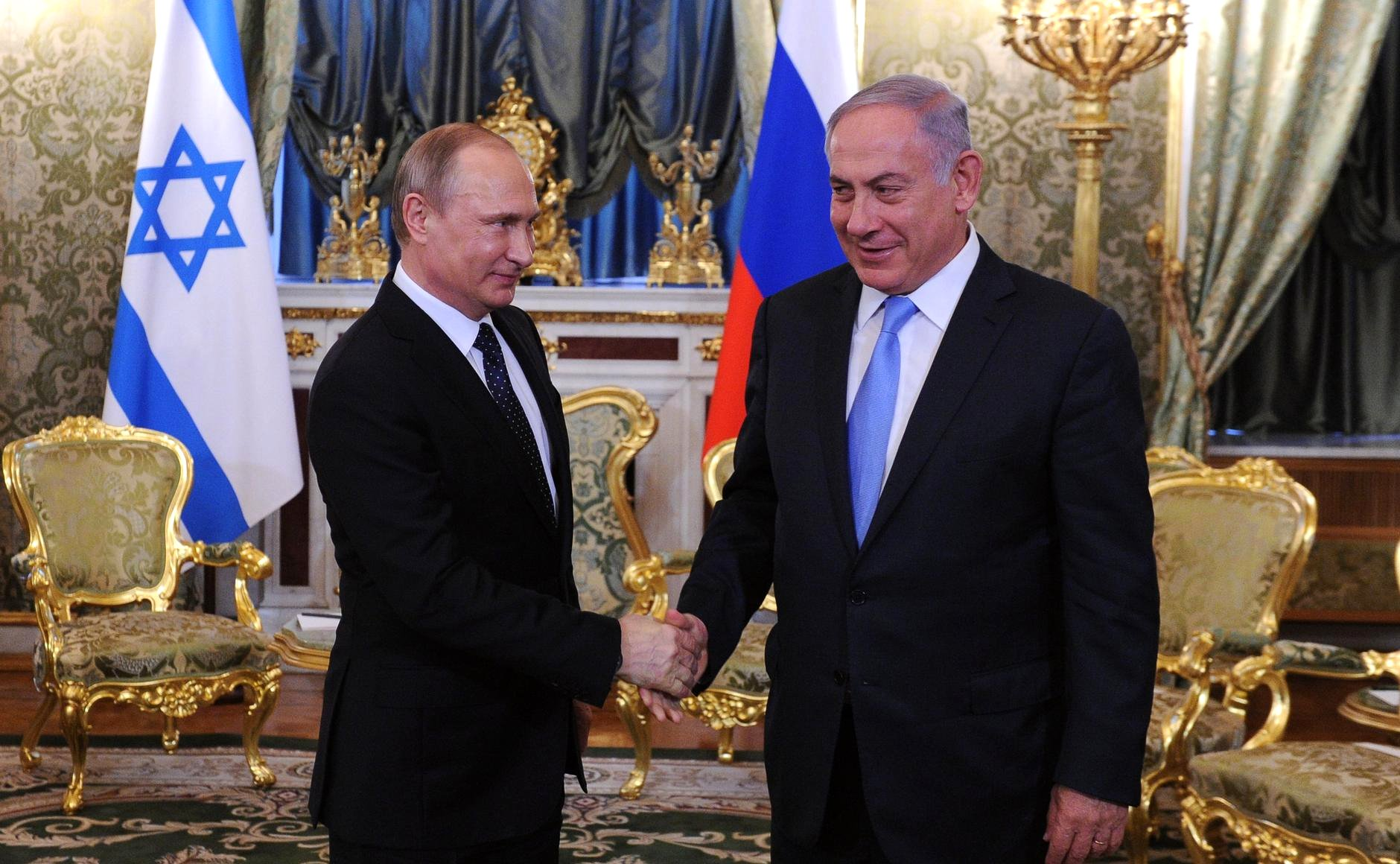
Russian president Vladimir Putin and Israeli prime minister Benjamin Netanyahu in 2016. The two long-serving leaders have had a close relationship.

The State of Israel is represented in the Russian Federation through an embassy in Moscow and a consulate-general in Saint Petersburg. Russia is represented in Israel through an embassy in Tel Aviv and a consulate in Haifa. Russia is a member of the Quartet on the Middle East. For many years, Israel was a haven for Russian Jews. This was especially the case during the aliyah from the Soviet Union in the 1970s and 1990s.

Israel and the Soviet Union, Russia's predecessor state, were on opposing sides during the Cold War. However, the relationship between Israel and Russia has improved significantly since the early 2000s, with the election of the more pro-Israel Russian leader Vladimir Putin, and the election of the more pro-Russia Israeli leader Ariel Sharon. Putin has had a close relationship with long-serving Israeli prime minister Benjamin Netanyahu.

Following the beginning of the Russo-Ukrainian war, relations took a downturn during Yair Lapid's tenure as Prime Minister of Israel. Relations improved after Netanyahu's return as prime minister, although cooler than they were before the war. Unlike many Western countries, Israel has maintained relations with the Kremlin, refused to impose sanctions against Russia, and rejected calls to send military aid to Ukraine. Relations became strained during the Gaza war. However, Russia continued to be Israel's biggest supplier of fuel and one of its biggest suppliers of crude oil during the Gaza war. While Russia condemned Israeli and American attacks on Iran in 2025 and 2026, it did not send military aid to Iran during the Twelve-Day War.

The Russian language is the third-most widely spoken first language in Israel after Hebrew and Arabic; Israel has the third-largest number of Russian speakers outside of the post-Soviet states and the highest as a proportion of the total population; in 2017 it was estimated that 1.5 million Israelis could speak Russian, which would amount to 17.25% of Israel's population. Over 100,000 Israeli citizens live in Russia, with 80,000 of them living in Moscow, while hundreds of thousands of Russian citizens live in Israel.

== History ==
=== Soviet Union ===
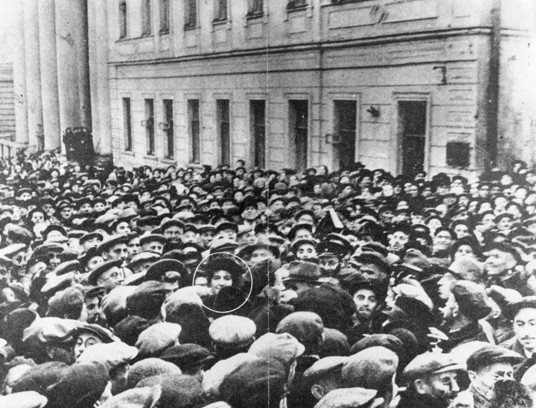
The Israeli ambassador to the Soviet Union, Golda Meir, is surrounded by crowd of 50,000 Jews near Moscow Choral Synagogue on the first day of Rosh Hashanah in 1948.

With the German invasion of the Soviet Union in 1941, Joseph Stalin reversed his long-standing opposition to Zionism and tried to mobilize worldwide Jewish support for the Soviet war effort. The Jewish Anti-Fascist Committee was set up in Moscow. Many thousands of Jewish refugees fled the Nazis and entered the Soviet Union during the war, where they reinvigorated Jewish religious activities and opened new synagogues. From late 1944, Stalin adopted an openly pro-Zionist foreign policy apparently in the belief that the new country would be socialist and would speed the decline of British influence in the Middle East.

In May 1947, Soviet Deputy Foreign Minister Andrei Gromyko told the United Nations that the Soviets supported the partition of Palestine into a Jewish and an Arab state. The Soviet Union and its satellite states voted in November 1947 for the UN Partition Plan for Palestine.

The Soviet Union provided diplomatic support for the founding of Israel and supported its admission to the UN. On 17 May 1948, three days after Israel declared its independence, the Soviets officially recognized Israel.

Golda Meir was appointed Israel's ambassador to the Soviet Union; her term began on 2 September 1948 and ended in March 1949. She attended Rosh Hashanah and Yom Kippur services at the Moscow Choral Synagogue. However, after Israel had been established, Stalin reduced his support, arrested the leaders of the Jewish Anti-Fascist Committee, and launched attacks on Soviet Jews.

Soviet-Israeli relations worsened from 1949 to 1952, but the USSR still gave some diplomatic support to Israel and remained mostly neutral in the Arab-Israeli dispute until 1954. The USSR adopted a clear position of support for the Arab states against Israel beginning in 1955.

Relations were severed by the Soviet government in June 1967 in protest of Israeli policy during the Six-Day War and immediately afterward. The Soviet Union supported Israel's Arab enemies with arms and training, and Soviet forces were deployed to Egypt during the War of Attrition in which they repeatedly engaged Israeli forces.

After the Soviets cut off diplomatic relations with Israel due to the Six-Day War, the Dutch embassy in Moscow established an Israel interests' section, which represented Israel in the Soviet Union until diplomatic relations were re-established in October 1991.

=== 1990s ===
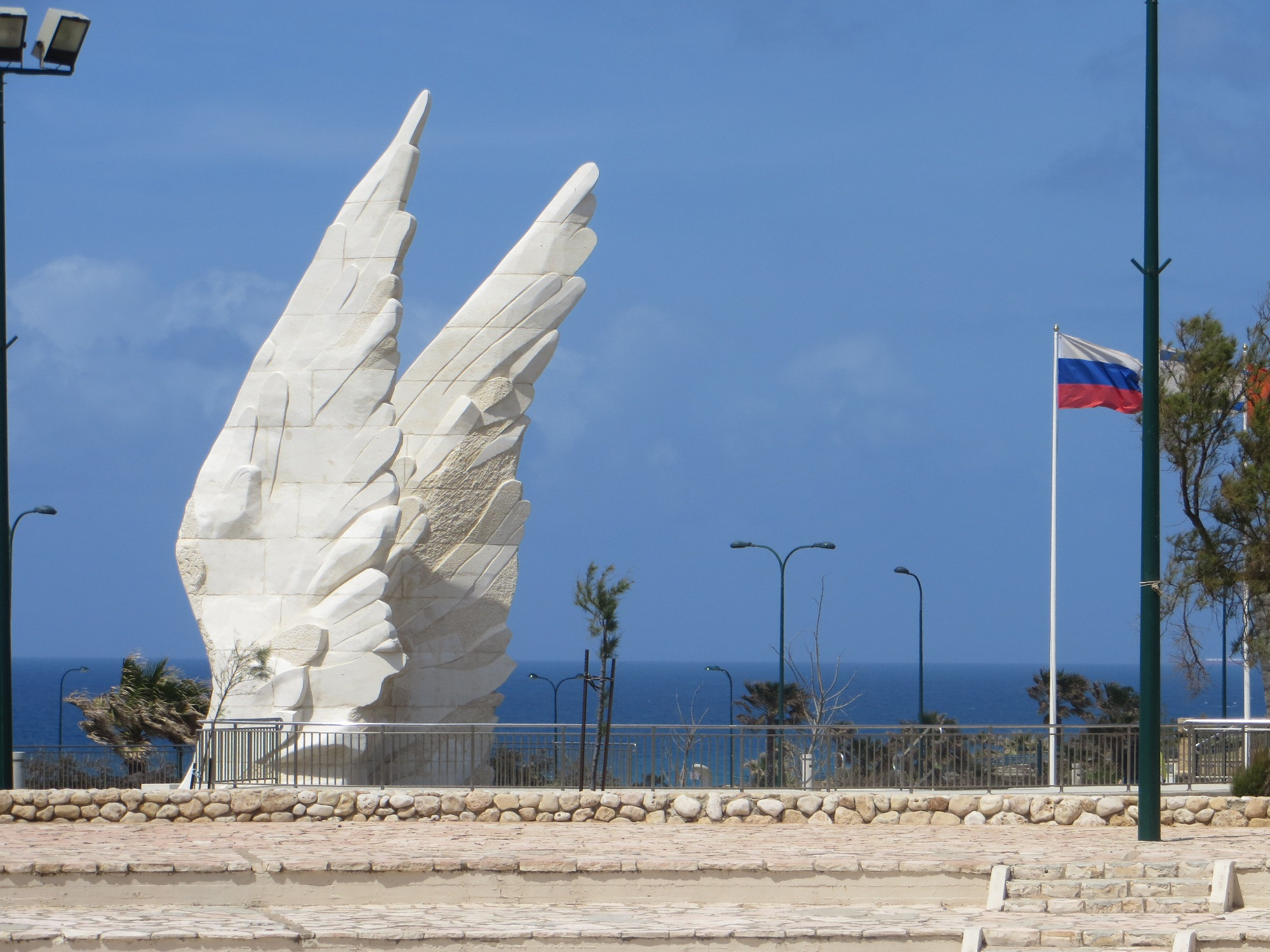
Victory Monument in Netanya, Israel, dedicated to the victory in World War II.

The Soviet Union resumed diplomatic relations with Israel on 18 October 1991, towards the end of Glasnost and Perestroika. The journalist Alexander Bovin became the first Soviet ambassador to Israel in 24 years. After the Soviet Union collapsed two months later, he continued to serve as Russia's ambassador to Israel.

The end of the Soviet Union caused massive immigration wave of Jews from the ex-Soviet states. Demand from the new immigrants caused many Russian-language newspapers to appear, and with the development of the multichannel television in Israel during the 1990s, many Russian channels started being rebroadcast in Israel. In November 2002, a new Israeli-Russian channel, Israel Plus, emerged.

On 19 October 1999, Defence Minister of China, General Chi Haotian, after meeting with Syrian defense minister Mustafa Tlass in Damascus, Syria, to discuss expanding military ties between Syria and China, flew to Israel and met with Ehud Barak, the prime minister and Defence Minister of Israel, where they discussed military relations. Among the military arrangements was a $1 billion Israeli-Russian sale of military aircraft to China, which were to be jointly produced by Russia and Israel.

In 1999, as foreign minister, Ariel Sharon began to court more friendly relations with Russia as a result of the large-scale immigration of Russian-speakers to Israel: "The Russian vote will decide the outcome of the [Israeli] election".

Relations between Israel and Russia were improved by Israeli opposition to the 1999 NATO bombing of Yugoslavia, as well as Israeli support for IMF loans to Russia. Russian prime minister Yevgeny Primakov subsequently said that if he was an Israeli, he would vote for incumbent prime minister Benjamin Netanyahu in the 1999 Israeli general election.

=== 2000s ===
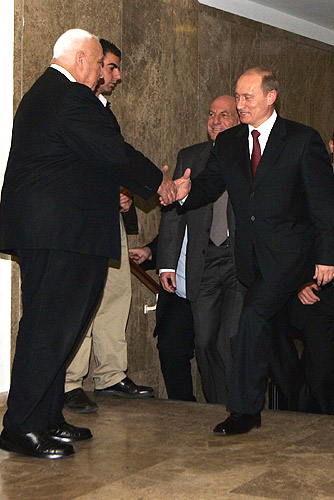
Prime Minister Ariel Sharon and President Vladimir Putin meeting in Israel

The relationship between Israel and Russia substantially began to improve only in 2000, with the election of the more pro-Israel Vladimir Putin, and in 2001, with election of the more pro-Russian Ariel Sharon, who described Putin as "a true friend of Israel". In 2005, Vladimir Putin visited Jerusalem.

In 2006, Israeli troops found evidence of Russian made Kornet-E and Metis-M anti-tank systems in Hezbollah's possession in southern Lebanon. In 2007, in response to accusations that it was supplying terrorist groups with weapons, Russia said it was conducting inspections of Syrian weapons storage facilities to prevent the weapons from reaching unintended customers. This strained the already-deteriorating relations between Russia and Israel. In the same year, Vladimir Zhirinovsky, visiting as part of a government delegation, said that he was concerned particularly about the economic situation for the more than one million Russians living in Israel, and that "Russia will never allow any kind of violence against Israel".

Russia planned to sell advanced surface-to-air missiles to neighboring countries, and condemned Israel's actions in the Gaza War. Russia also sent 60 tons of tent, medicines, food and other humanitarian aid to the Palestinians.

=== 2010s ===
In 2011, Putin said: "Israel is, in fact, a special state to us. It is practically a Russian-speaking country. Israel is one of the few foreign countries that can be called Russian-speaking. It's apparent that more than half of the population speaks Russian". Putin additionally claimed that Israel could be considered part of the Russian cultural world, and contended that "songs which are considered to be national Israeli songs in Israel are in fact Russian national songs". He further stated that he regarded Russian-speaking Israeli citizens as his compatriots and part of the 'Russian world'. In 2012, Vladimir Putin once again visited Jerusalem.

In April 2014, Israel took a neutral stance on the Russian annexation of Crimea at the United Nations, angering U.S. State Department and White House officials. During Operation Protective Edge in 2014, Putin stated that "I support Israel's battle that is intended to keep its citizens protected". In August, Russia began increasing fruit imports from Israel, after banning food imports from the EU, Norway, United States, Canada and Australia. About two months later India and Israel started to export meat to Russia.

Relations between Israel and Russia further improved after the Russian military intervention in Syria in September 2015. From then until July 2018, Israeli prime minister Benjamin Netanyahu and Putin met a total of nine times. In October 2015, Israel and Russia held meetings to coordinate over Syria, and avoid accidentally clashing or scrambling each other's communications while operating over the country.

In March 2016, Putin said the relations with Israel were special and based "on friendship, mutual understanding and the long common history". Putin stated: "Russia and Israel have developed a special relationship. 1.5 million Israeli citizens come from the former Soviet Union, they speak the Russian language, are the bearers of Russian culture, Russian mentality. They maintain relations with their relatives and friends in Russia, and this make the interstate relations very special". In a meeting with Netanyahu in June 2016, Putin described Israel and Russia as "unconditional allies" in "efforts to counter international terrorism".

Prior to and immediately after the 2016 United States presidential election, Israel began lobbying the United States to strike a deal with Russia over restricting the Iranian military presence in Syria in exchange for removing sanctions over Russian military action in Ukraine. Donald Trump was reportedly a favored candidate for both Russia and Israel, as Trump is widely seen, by both, as a strong supporter for Israel yet friendly to Russia.

In November 2016, Russian Prime Minister Dmitry Medvedev visited the Western Wall in Jerusalem, where he stated that “The memory of the six million Jews who perished in the Holocaust [...] should be forever etched in the history of mankind [...] This tragedy can never be repeated".

In December 2016, Netanyahu instructed Israel's UN delegation to skip a General Assembly vote on war crimes committed in Syria, under diplomatic pressure from Russia. The following day, Russian UN Ambassador Vitaly Churkin proposed postponing a vote on Security Council Resolution 2334 to condemn Israeli settlement-building in the West Bank until after the inauguration of U.S. president Donald Trump, in order to allow the new U.S. administration a say on the resolution, but this was rejected by other Security Council members.

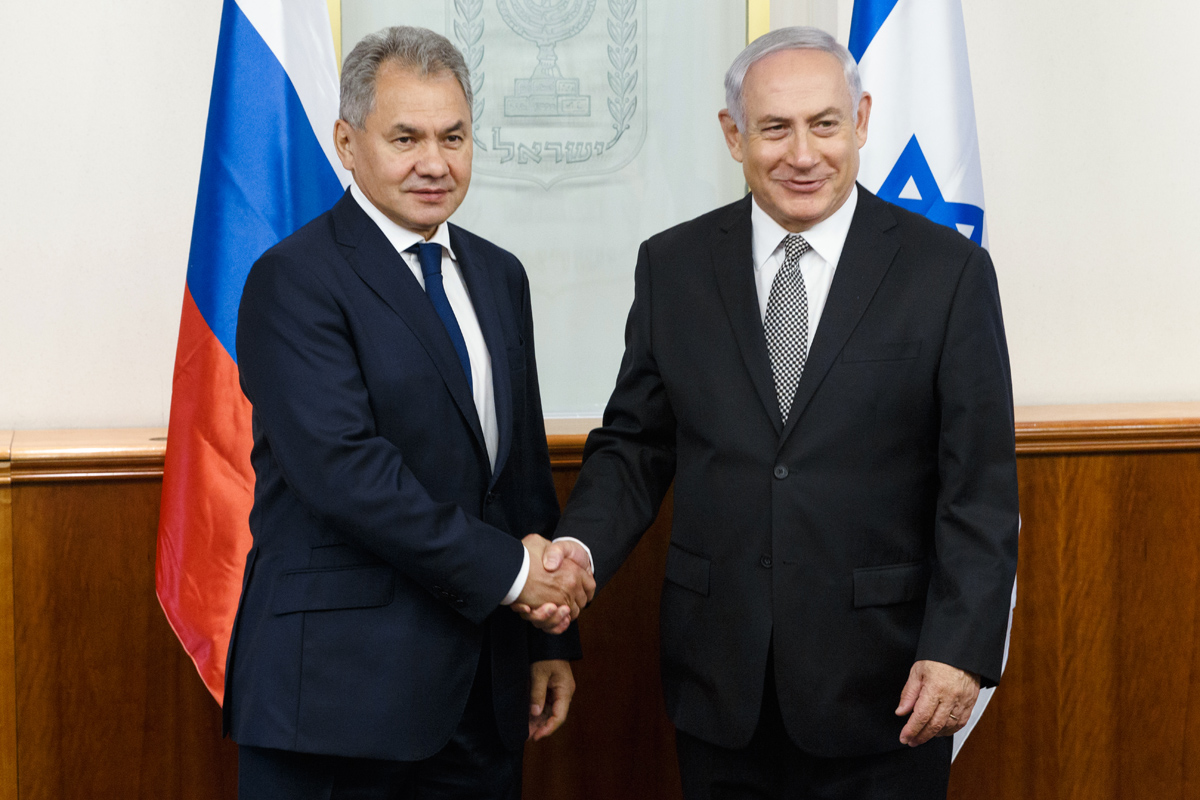
Benyamin Netanyahu and Russian defense minister Sergei Shoigu in 2017

In January 2017, Russian foreign minister Sergey Lavrov stated that Israel and Russia were "working closely" together in an attempt to stop the extradition of dual Russian-Israeli citizen Alexander Lapshin from Belarus to Azerbaijan.

In April 2017, Russia recognized West Jerusalem as the capital of Israel.

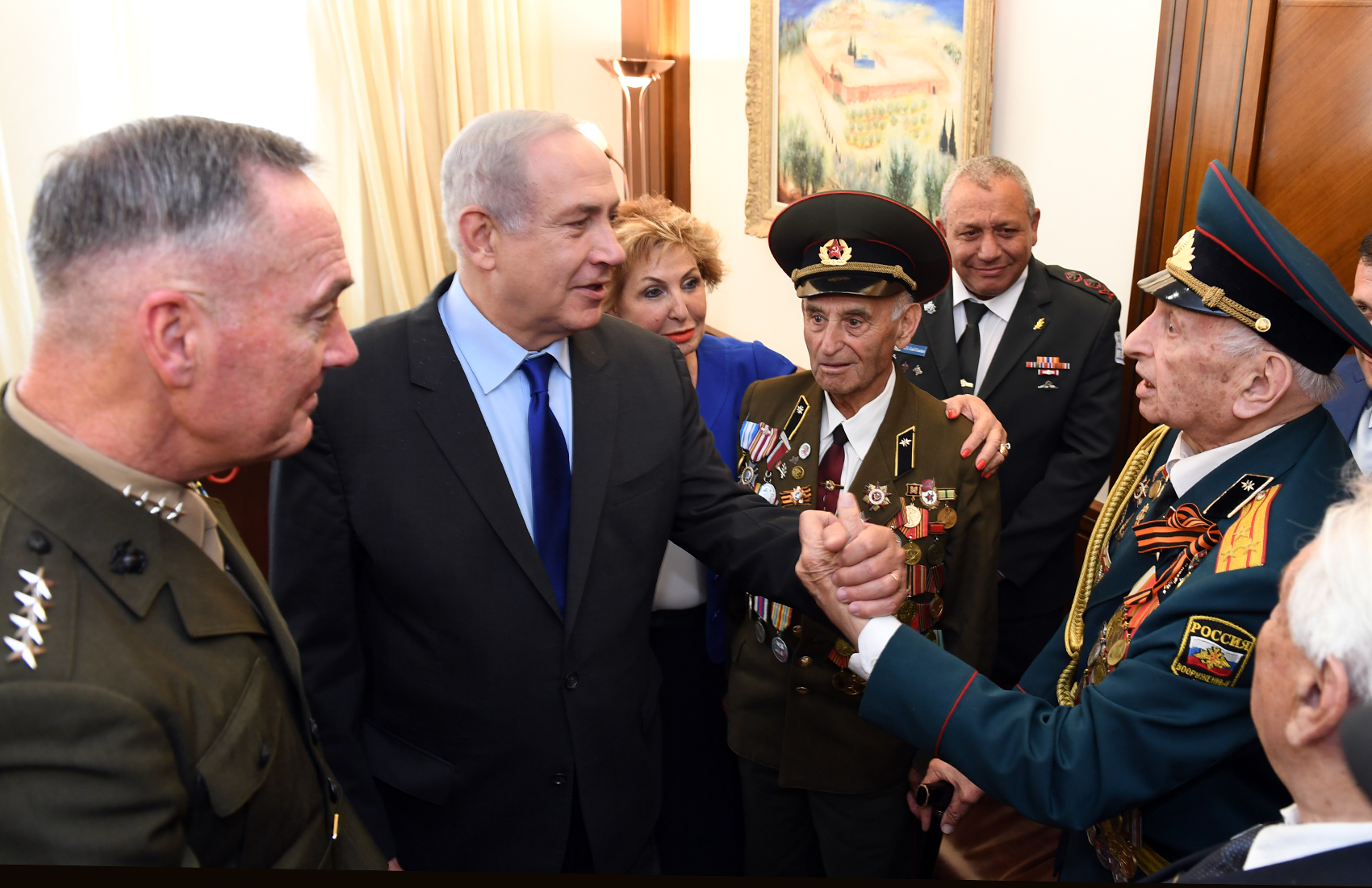
Jewish Red Army veterans in Jerusalem during the Victory Day on 9 May 2017

In March 2018, Israel declined to attribute the poisoning of Sergei and Yulia Skripal to Russia in its statement on the matter and refused to expel any Russian diplomats, drawing criticism from the United Kingdom. In May 2018, Defence Minister Avigdor Lieberman stated the Israeli government had opposed sanctions on Russia despite foreign pressure to support them.

At the 2018 Russia–United States Summit in July 2018, U.S. president Donald Trump and Putin agreed to cooperate in Syria to ensure Israel's security. U.S. National Security Advisor John R. Bolton later claimed that both Israel and Russia sought the withdrawal of Iranian forces from Syria. Russia later offered to create a 100 kilometre buffer zone on the Syrian side of the Israel-Syria border which Iranian troops would be barred from, though this offer was rejected by Israel.

In September 2018, relations somewhat deteriorated after the Russian Defense Ministry blamed the Israeli military for the downing of a Russian plane after putting it in the path of Syrian air defence systems during an Israeli strike on Hezbollah targets in Syria. Although Putin initially absolved Israel, Russia subsequently upgraded Syrian air defences to the S-300 missile system over Israeli objections, refused Israeli offers to send a delegation to Moscow to resolve the dispute, and ignored attempts by the Israeli Prime Minister's Office to set up a meeting with Putin.

In December 2018, Russia backed Israel's security concerns over Hezbollah tunnels dug under the Israel-Lebanon border, urging Lebanon to resolve the issue. On 25 December 2018, Russia condemned an Israeli airstrike on a Syrian arms depot, claiming that the "provocative actions of the Israeli air force... directly threatened two airliners."

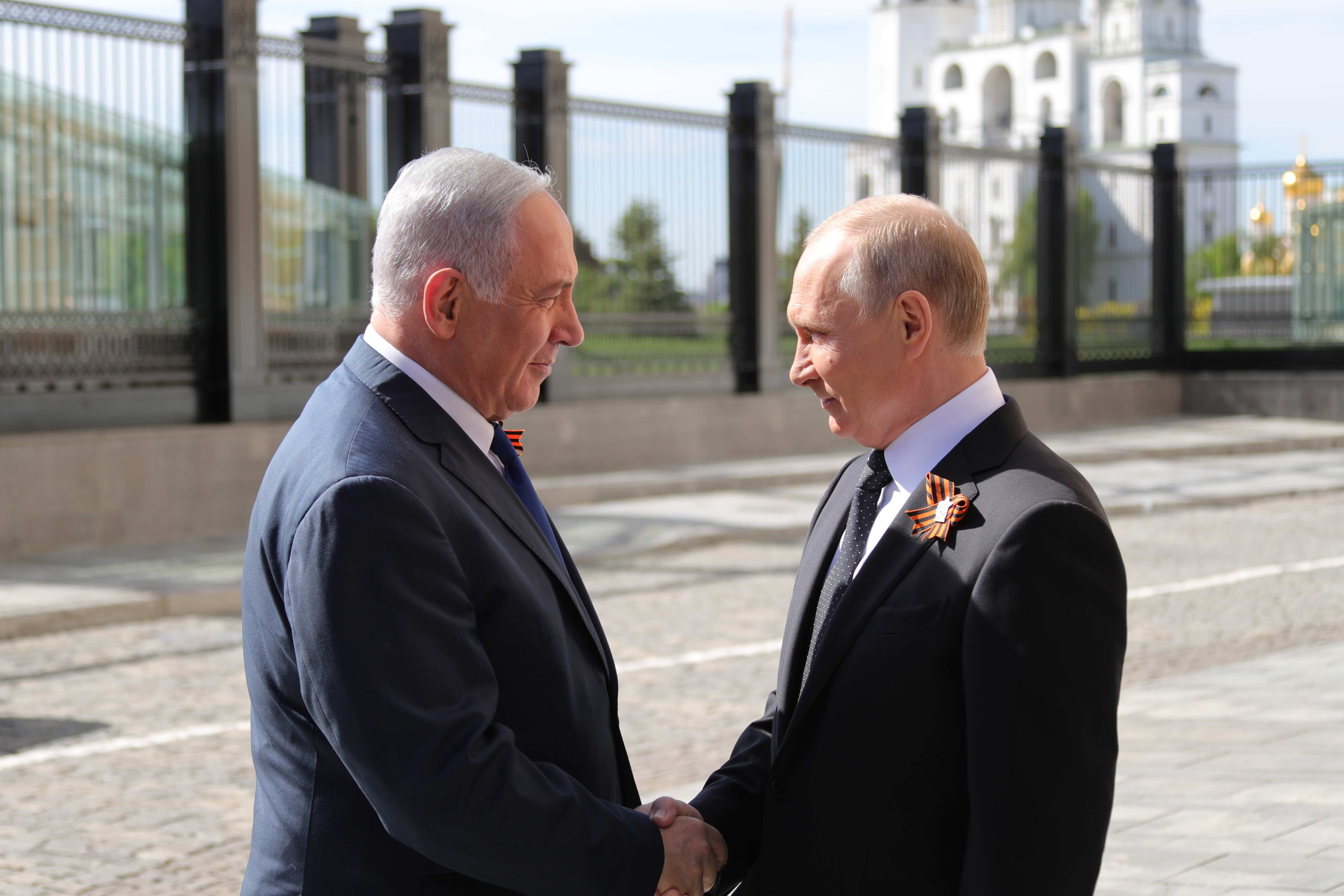
Benjamin Netanyahu and Vladimir Putin in 2018.

In December 2018, Israel reversed its stance on Crimea at the United Nations, voting to condemn Russian activity there. Israeli officials stated it did so at the request of the United States government. However, the following year in August 2019, Netanyahu declined to condemn the annexation of Crimea, stating that he had "nothing to add to what was done at the time" of the annexation, when Israel took a neutral position.

On 7 February 2019, the Russian Deputy Foreign Minister urged Israel to cease its airstrikes in Syria. Relations were repaired after a meeting between Putin and Netanyahu in Moscow on 29 February 2019, after which Netanyahu announced Russian support for removing Iranian fighters from Syria, and that Putin had accepted his offer to visit Jerusalem. On 3 March 2019, Netanyahu announced the establishment of a joint Israeli-Russian team to pursue the withdrawal of all foreign troops deployed in Syria. On 18 March 2019, Putin suggested inviting Netanyahu to Crimea for the opening of a new synagogue there.

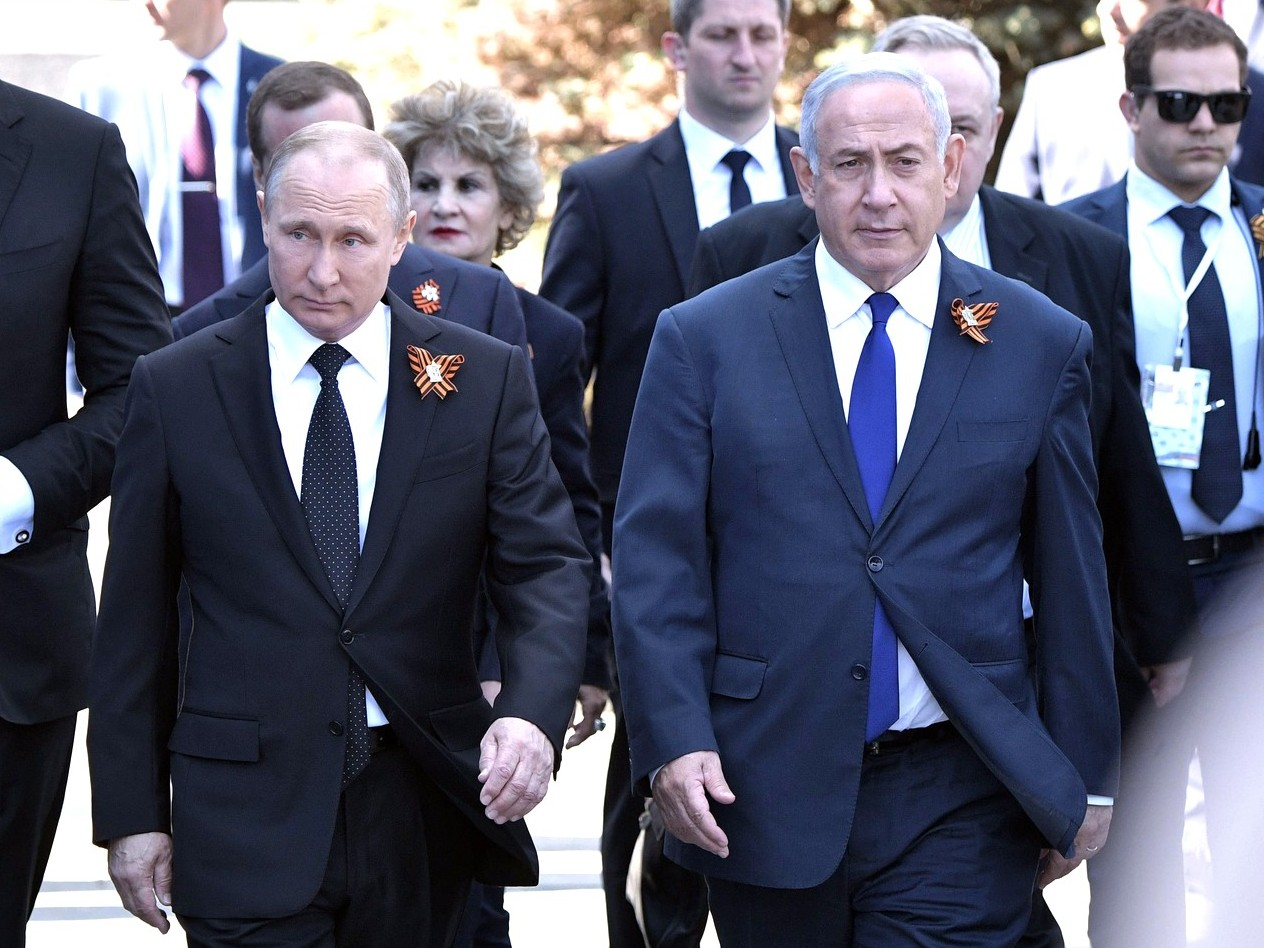
Putin and Netanyahu during the Moscow Victory Day Parade on 9 May 2018

During the period preceding the April 2019 Israeli legislative election, Shin Bet chief Nadav Argaman warned that an unnamed foreign country was planning to interfere in the election; media speculation focused on Russia. Russia denied the reports. Putin's press secretary, Dmitry Peskov, stated that it was "out of the question" and suggested "to not read the Israeli media". Benny Gantz and Tamar Zandberg, the leaders of the opposition parties Blue and White and Meretz respectively, subsequently accused Russia of favouring Netanyahu. Netanyahu later touted his relationship with Putin in campaign billboards prior to the September 2019 Israeli legislative election.

Relations improved after 4 April 2019, when Netanyahu again travelled to Moscow to meet Putin. Putin returned the remains of IDF soldier Zechariah Baumel, which had been recovered by Russian troops in Syria. Netanyahu subsequently thanked Putin for their "personal friendship", while Putin expressed his appreciation for the Israeli policy of honouring Red Army soldiers who fought in World War II. Netanyahu also specifically praised the Russian defense ministry, despite its criticisms of Israel following the downing of a Russian plane the year prior, for its contribution to the retrieval of Baumel's remains, which Netanyahu said Israel would "never forget". On 25 June 2019, Israel convened its first trilateral summit between its national security adviser and his respective American and Russian counterparts, specifically focusing on the Iranian military presence in Syria.

In October 2019, Russia arrested Israeli national Naama Issachar for alleged drug smuggling. Issachar's family and Israeli officials claimed that Russia had told them she could be released if Aleksei Burkov, a Russian national pending extradition from Israel to the United States, was released to Russia. Netanyahu subsequently personally requested a pardon for Issachar from Putin, which Putin said he would consider. Israel's High Court ultimately rejected Burkov's appeal against his extradition, leading Russia to condemn the decision as "a breach ... of Israel's international obligations", claiming that the decision "does not contribute to the development of [Russian-Israeli] relations". On 29 January 2020, President Putin signed her pardon. Her attorney previously noted that no convicted foreigner was ever pardoned by a Russian president before. The Russian pardon was reportedly made in exchange for a transfer of ownership of the Alexander's Courtyard in Jerusalem to the Russian Orthodox Church.

In December 2019, Netanyahu once again emphasised the importance of his personal relationship with Putin, stating that Putin had told him their countries could have had a military confrontation had it not been for their regular meetings.

=== 2020s ===
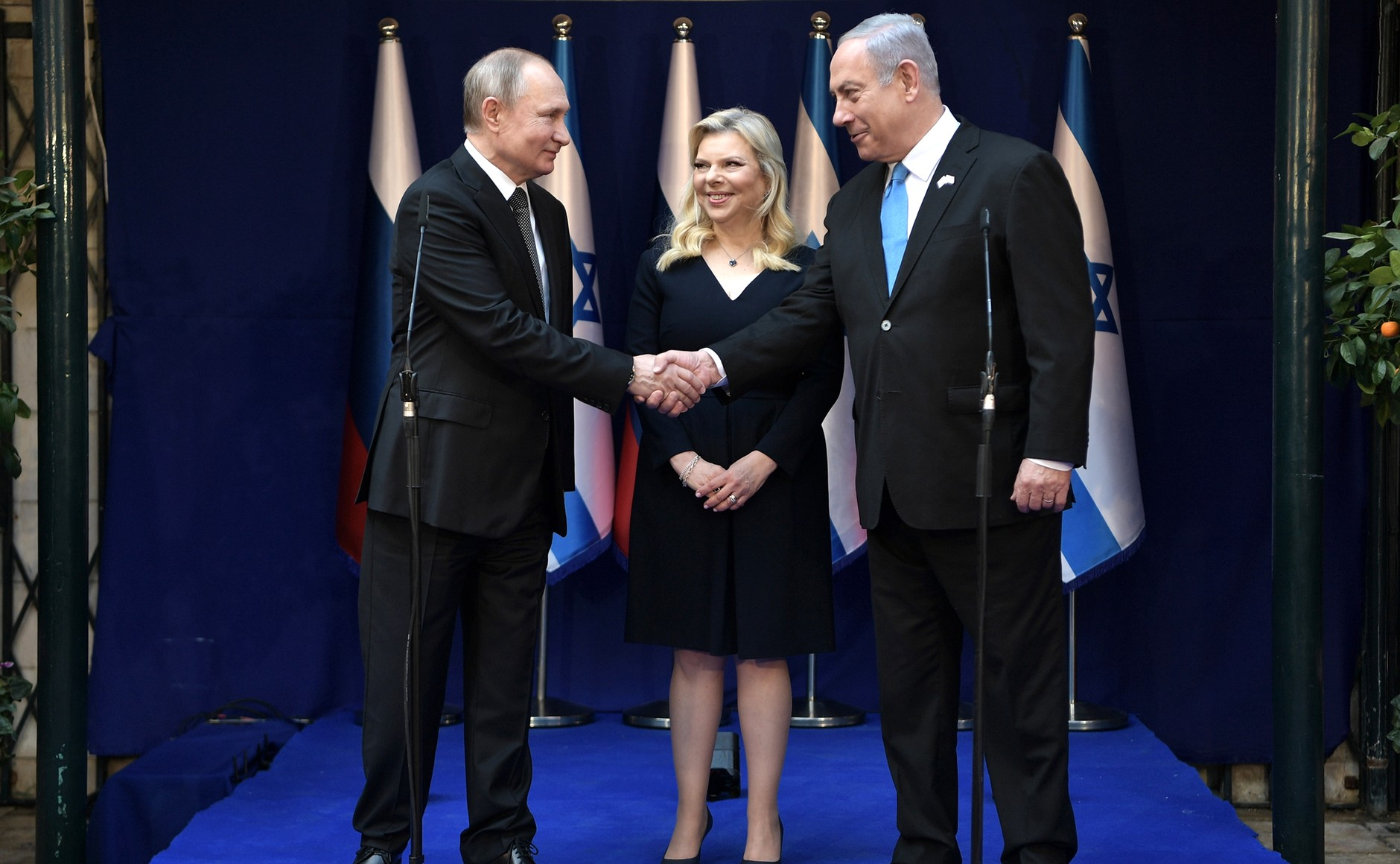
Putin and Netanyahu in January 2020

In January 2020, Russian president Vladimir Putin was in Israel for a one-day visit for the 75th anniversary of the liberation of the Auschwitz death camp.

On 10 January 2020, Israel released two Syrian prisoners, including one convicted of espionage, as part of a "gesture of goodwill" in a deal brokered by Russia. On 15 January 2020, an Asia Times report cited an Israeli foreign ministry official as stating that Russia expected Israeli diplomatic assistance in ending international sanctions on the Syrian government in return for permitting the continuation of Israeli airstrikes in Syria.

On 11 August 2020, the day Putin declared that Russia was the first country to produce a successful anti-COVID vaccine, the Times of Israel reported that the Israeli Haddasah Medical Center was still conducting clinical trials of the vaccine in its Moscow clinic.

In November 2020, Israeli prime minister Benjamin Netanyahu spoke about the possibility of purchasing the Russian-made Sputnik V vaccine. The Haddasah Medical Center then signed a commercial memorandum of understanding to obtain 1.5 to 3 million doses.

On 15 December 2020, Russian foreign minister Sergey Lavrov praised the 2020 normalisation of relations between Israel and several Arab states, describing it as a "positive phenomenon".

In the same month, relations deteriorated after the Russian ambassador to Israel, Anatoly Viktorov, defended Iran, criticized Israeli "noncompliance with UN resolutions in the Israel-Arab and Israel-Palestinian conflict" and disputed Israeli claims that Hezbollah had constructed underground tunnels from Lebanon.

This led the Israeli Foreign Ministry to rebuke Viktorov, and Foreign Minister Gabi Ashkenazi stated, "Israel does not accept these statements and thus I hope we will bring an end to such embarrassing and unacceptable statements between us and Russia". Viktorov subsequently partially backtracked, claiming that he had been quoted out of context and did not mean to suggest Israel was a greater destabilizing factor than Iran.

Russian Foreign Ministry spokeswoman Maria Zakharova described the Israeli reaction as "overly sensitive" and backed Viktorov's remarks, stating, "All statements by the Russian ambassador quoted in the publication are in line with Russia's well-known position on the Middle East." However, she reaffirmed that Russia was "committed to continue taking into account Israel's security concerns in the decision-making process".

On 21 January 2021, Russian foreign minister Sergey Lavrov stated at a press conference that Israel should inform Russia about potential threats it faces from Syria rather than bombing them, and Russia "will take every measure to neutralise the threat" that Israel faces from Iran's presence in Syria.

In a congratulatory message following the victory of Isaac Herzog in the June 2021 Israeli presidential election, Putin noted "friendly relations" between Russia and Israel. Putin expressed a desire for "further development of multifaceted and constructive bilateral cooperation, including interaction in international affairs" as something that would be in "our peoples' fundamental interests".

Putin expressed similar sentiments in a congratulatory message to Naftali Bennett, following the start of his tenure as Prime Minister in June 2021. Putin also sent a thank you letter to outgoing prime minister Netanyahu, praising Netanyahu for the "great work [he has] invested in strengthening the ties between our nations in many areas" and stating that Netanyahu's "capabilities and experience will always be an asset to Israel". Upon receiving the letter, Netanyahu reportedly told Russian ambassador Viktorov to "Tell President Putin that I will be back soon", and Kremlin spokesman Dmitry Peskov mentioned the long relationship between the two leaders.

Following their first meeting in Sochi on 21 October 2021, Putin urged the Bennett government to "pursue a policy of continuity on Russian-Israel relations" from the warm ties during the Netanyahu era and Bennett described Putin as a "true friend of the Jewish people", noting that he and Putin discussed "ways to deal with Islamic fundamentalism". During the meeting, Putin reportedly asked Bennett for his diplomatic assistance in easing U.S. sanctions on Syria, pitching the proposal as a means of decreasing Iranian economic influence in Syria. Putin also declined a proposal by Bennett to host a Russia-Ukraine summit in Jerusalem, harshly criticizing Ukrainian president Volodymyr Zelenskyy.

In February 2022, Russia turned down an Israeli demand to remove electromagnetic interference from its Syrian air station on planes landing in Tel Aviv, complicating tensions between the two countries.

On 18 April 2022, Putin wrote a letter to Bennett demanding that Russia be granted control over Alexander's Courtyard in Jerusalem, as per an earlier agreement with former Primoe Minister Netanyahu. Following an Israeli court ruling annulling Netanyahu's agreement, the final decision on the transfer was left to former prime minister Bennett. The notice of alleged legal violations of the Jewish Agency in Russia is a major blow to diplomatic relations between the two nations.

In January 2023, it was reported that Vladimir Putin had fired top national security official after he called the Chabad-Lubavitch Hasidic movement a "supremacist cult".

On 6 February 2023, it was reported that Russia had relayed a Syrian request for aid from Israel following the 2023 Turkey–Syria earthquake, which was subsequently accepted by Israel.

In June 2023, Russia accused the United States of hacking the iPhones of Israeli diplomats based in Russia.

In June 2023, Russia also announced it would open consular offices in West Jerusalem, which was welcomed by Israeli foreign minister Eli Cohen as in line with Israeli efforts to increase foreign missions in Jerusalem.

==== 2022 Russian invasion of Ukraine ====
In February 2022, the Ukrainian Ambassador to Israel accused Israeli foreign minister Yair Lapid of reinforcing "Russian propaganda", after Lapid said that Israeli officials "don't see a violent confrontation soon" between Ukraine and Russia. The Israeli Foreign Ministry summoned the Ukrainian ambassador for an official reprimand. The Israeli Ministry of Defense also preemptively informed the Baltic countries of Lithuania, Latvia and Estonia that it would not permit the transfer of Israeli-made weaponry to Ukraine, to placate Russia. Israel also rejected a U.S. request to sell the Iron Dome air defense system to Ukraine, citing the need to avoid conflict with Russia.

On 24 February 2022, Israeli foreign minister Yair Lapid spoke out against the Russian invasion of Ukraine, stating "Russia's attack against Ukraine is a serious violation of international order," and that Israel "is prepared to extend humanitarian aid to Ukrainian citizens." Despite not repeating Lapid's condemnation of Russia, Israeli prime minister Naftali Bennett expressed support for Ukraine, stating "our hearts are with the civilians who through no fault of their own have been thrust into this situation," and also offered humanitarian assistance to Ukraine as well.

Lapid's remarks were criticized by Opposition Leader Benjamin Netanyahu, who urged the Israeli government "to speak less about what they don't need to talk about" on Russia and accused the government of "too many unnecessary expressions and too many false predictions". Russia subsequently summoned the Israeli ambassador to Russia to clarify Israel's position. The Russian ambassador to Israel, Anataloy Viktorov, encouraged Israel to "stay wise and diplomatic and continue our joint work for the benefits of our countries and people", stating that he had provided Israel with "a number of materials" explaining the Russian invasion of Ukraine, and noting the Russian recognition of "Israel's legitimate security concerns" in Syria.

Israel declined to co-sponsor a UN Security Council resolution condemning the Russian invasion, leading to an expression of disappointment by the United States. Israel later voted in favour of a UN General Assembly resolution condemning the invasion. At the request of the United States, Israel also pushed the United Arab Emirates to back the resolution. Russia subsequently expressed strong dissatisfaction to the Israeli Foreign Ministry over Israel's support of the UN General Assembly resolution.

On 5 March 2022, Israeli prime minister Naftali Bennett flew to Moscow to have a three-hour meeting with Putin about the situation in Ukraine, after which Bennett spoke to Ukrainian President Volodymyr Zelenskyy by phone and flew to Germany to meet with Chancellor Olaf Scholz. Bennett also brought up the subject of the significant Jewish community caught up in the war during their three-hour discussion in the Kremlin, according to the Israeli source.

On 11 March 2022, Ukrainian ambassador to Israel Yevgen Korniychuk stated that President Zelenskyy "does not" understand the Israeli refusal to provide defensive aid to Ukraine and accused Israel of being "afraid" of Russia's "few airplanes and anti-missile systems in Syria". He described Israeli mediation of the conflict as an excuse for not providing active support to Ukraine. Israel also immediately rejected a Ukrainian request for cyber weaponry, including Pegasus, to be used against Russia.

An unnamed senior Ukrainian official accused Bennett of having "proposed that we surrender", claiming that Bennett urged Zelenskyy to "take the offer" of a peace deal from Putin. This report was subsequently denied by both the Israeli prime minister's office and a senior adviser to Zelenskyy.

The United States has publicly urged Israel to back international sanctions against Russia. Under Secretary of State for Political Affairs Victoria Nuland called on Israel not "to become the last haven for dirty money that's fueling Putin's wars".

On 12 March 2022, Ukrainian defense minister Oleksiy Reznikov accused Israel of "unexplained indifference and unwillingness to take a side in the war" between Ukraine and Russia.

On 16 March 2022, Russian foreign minister Sergey Lavrov said that Russia viewed Israeli mediation favourably, due to Israel not joining international sanctions against Russia. However, Israel has affirmed that it will not allow itself to be used by Russian nationals to evade U.S. sanctions.

Following the Bucha massacre, Israeli finance minister Avigdor Lieberman condemned "war crimes" but declined to condemn Russia specifically, describing "mutual accusations" where "Russia blames Ukraine and Ukraine blames Russia", drawing a rebuke from the Ukrainian ambassador to Israel. Foreign Minister Lapid stated that "Russian forces committed war crimes." Israel subsequently voted for a resolution to suspend Russia from the United Nations Human Rights Council. The Russian Foreign Ministry condemned the vote and Lapid's remarks, stating that it had "taken note of Israeli Foreign Minister Yair Lapid's aggressive statements" and that they "evoke regret and rejection". The Russian Foreign Ministry also summoned the Israeli ambassador but declined to issue a formal diplomatic rebuke.

On 12 April 2022, Defense Minister Benny Gantz cited "regional considerations", including the "area border with Russia, practically speaking, over the skies of Syria and Lebanon", for its decision not to send military aid to Ukraine or join international sanctions on Russia.

On 20 April 2022, Gantz announced Israel would send protective equipment such as flak jackets and helmets to the Ukrainian emergency services, but not to the Ukrainian military. The Russian ambassador warned Israel that Russia would respond "accordingly" if military aid was provided.

A diplomatic row was sparked in May 2022, after Lavrov suggested that Hitler "had Jewish blood" and the "biggest antisemites tend to be Jews" in his critique of Ukrainian president Zelenskyy. Lapid described Lavrov's remarks as "unforgivable" and the "basest level of racism", demanding the "use of the Holocaust of the Jewish people for political purposes must stop immediately". The Israeli Foreign Ministry subsequently summoned the Russian ambassador to Israel and demanded an apology. The Russian Foreign Ministry responded by describing Lapid's comments as "anti-historical" and "explaining to a large extent why the current Israeli government supports the neo-Nazi regime in Kyiv". Russian president Vladimir Putin subsequently apologized for Lavrov's remarks on a call with Prime Minister Bennett, and Bennett stated that he had "thanked [Putin] for clarifying the president's view of the Jewish people and the memory of the Holocaust".

On 6 July 2022, Israeli officials stated that Israel was no longer involved in mediation efforts between Ukraine and Russia. Bennett later suggested that disagreement with the United States and the United Kingdom, which advocated a more "aggressive approach", along with the Bucha massacre, had led to the failure of Israeli-mediated peace talks.

On 21 July 2022, it was reported that the Russian Ministry of Justice is demanding the closure of the Jewish Agency for Israel in Russia. According to a report in the Russian news agency Interfax, the Ministry of Justice's request, which was submitted to the Moscow District Court, is related to "unspecified violations of Russian law." This move led to a diplomatic crisis with Israel, after there is unanimity at the governmental level in Israel that the Kremlin is leveraging the issue in light of Israel's harsh condemnations of Russia following the latter's invasion of Ukraine. The Russian Embassy in Cairo accused Prime Minister Lapid of "lies" about Russian involvement in the Bucha massacre and condemned his "complete disregard and contempt for the lives of Palestinians". The situation was described by Bloomberg News as the "worst rift in relations between Russia and Israel since the Soviet Union's collapse". Opposition leader Netanyahu condemned Lapid and Gantz for the deterioration in relations, stating that they were "endangering our national security" and that his "measured, balanced and responsible relationship" with Russia as Prime Minister was "being undermined before our eyes in recent weeks". Finance Minister Avigdor Lieberman criticised the "slightly obsessive and hysterical" response by Lapid to the Russian actions.

The former president of Russia, Dmitry Medvedev, claimed that shipping Israeli weapons to Ukraine would "destroy" the diplomatic relationship between the two countries, following discussions on the shipment of Israeli weapons to Ukraine after Russia repeatedly attacked it with Iranian HESA Shahed 136 kamikaze drones. Medvedev's warning came in response to statements by Israeli Diaspora Minister Nachman Shai, who called for military assistance to Ukraine.

On 14 November 2022, Israel abstained on a UN General Assembly vote that called for Russia to pay reparations to Ukraine, breaking with the United States and the European Union.

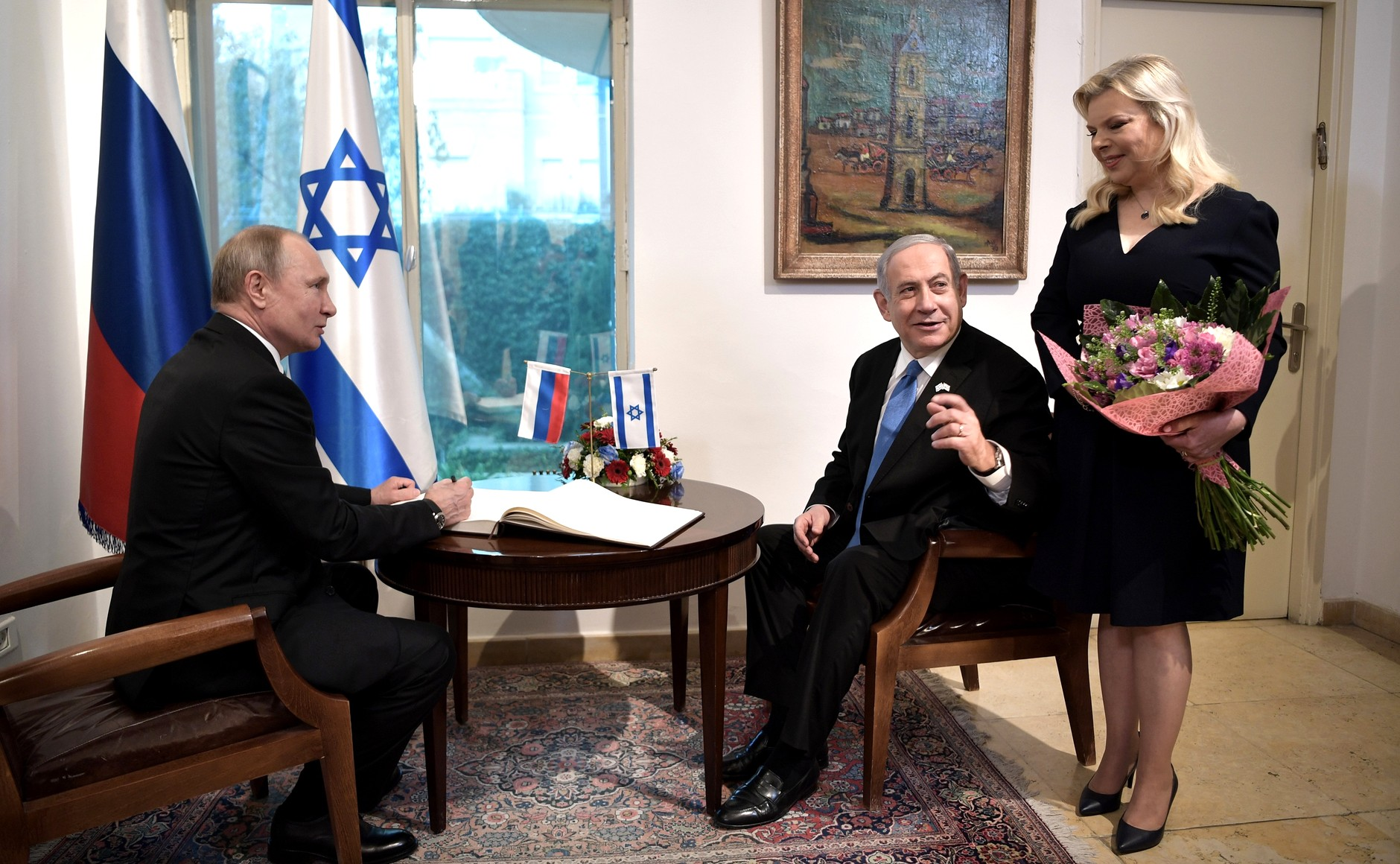
Putin and Netanyahu meeting in Israel

Following Netanyahu's victory in the 2022 Israeli legislative election, Russia adopted a conciliatory tone, suggesting that Netanyahu has "a common approach toward further developing bilateral relations". In his recently published book, Netanyahu wrote positively about Putin and describes him as "smart, sophisticated and focused on one goal – returning Russia to its historical greatness". Putin welcomed Netanyahu's election win and said he hopes to strengthen Russian-Israeli cooperation.

In January 2023, Israel refused a U.S. request to transfer MIM-23 Hawk batteries and anti-ballistic missiles to Ukraine.

On 30 January 2023, Netanyahu expressed interest in taking a mediating role in the conflict, if this was supported by Russia, Ukraine and the United States.

In May 2023, an Israeli foreign ministry delegation made an official visit to Moscow, the first since the Russian invasion of Ukraine.

In July 2023, cybersecurity firm Cybereason claimed it had uncovered an online Russian influence campaign in Israel, which had promoted the idea of a connection between Ukraine and Nazism, and suggested that the U.S. was supporting the 2023 Israeli judicial reform protests against the Israeli government.

==== Gaza war ====
Russian president Vladimir Putin condemned the October 7 attacks that sparked the Gaza war and said Israel had a right to defend itself, but also criticised Israel's response and said Israel should not besiege the Gaza Strip in the way Nazi Germany besieged Leningrad. Putin suggested that Russia could be a mediator in the conflict.

Israel summoned the Russian ambassador to Israel to protest the Russian decision to host a Hamas political delegation in October 2023, while Russia claimed that this was part of its longstanding policy to maintain contact with all sides in the conflict.

In October 2023, a mob in Dagestan stormed Uytash Airport, shouting anti-Semitic slogans and attempting to find Israeli passport holders. Russia condemned the mob, and Israel urged Russian law enforcement to "take robust action against the rioters and against the unbridled incitement being directed at Jews and Israelis".

In November 2023, the Israeli ambassador to the UN described Russian criticism at the UN of Israeli military actions in Gaza as "ridiculous", accusing Russia of attempting to divert attention from its invasion of Ukraine.

Relations between Israel and Russia deteriorated as a result of the conflict, with Israel no longer providing advance notice to Russia of its airstrikes in Syria.

In a December 2023, during a call between Netanyahu and Putin, Netanyahu expressed displeasure over Russia's conduct at the UN and described its growing ties to Iran as dangerous, but thanked Russian foreign minister Sergey Lavrov for his involvement in freeing Russian-Israeli dual national hostages held by Hamas. Shortly after the call, Russian Deputy Foreign Minister Mikhail Bogdanov demanded that Hamas and other Palestinian groups immediately release all hostages, while Lavrov distanced Russia from Hamas, reiterating that Russia condemned the October attack and considered it terrorism, and maintained relations only with Hamas's political wing.

On 28 December 2023, Lavrov praised Netanyahu for not criticising Russia in public statements. Lavrov said that Russia's goals of "demilitarization" and "denazification" in Ukraine were similar to Israel's stated goals of defeating Hamas and extremism in Gaza.

In January 2024, Russian Foreign Ministry spokeswoman Maria Zakharova criticized the content of Germany's intervention on behalf of Israel in the South Africa v. Israel case at the International Court of Justice, accusing Germany of ignoring non-Jewish European victims of the Holocaust, such as Slavs in the former Soviet Union. The Israeli Foreign Ministry described her remarks as a "distortion of the Holocaust".

In January 2024, Lavrov accused the United States of seeking a "final solution" to the "Russian question" by assembling a coalition of European countries to support the Ukrainian war effort, in reference to the Holocaust. During an interview with Russian media, Israeli ambassador to Russia Simona Halperin subsequently accused Lavrov of downplaying the Holocaust, criticized the time taken by Russia to condemn the Hamas attack on Israel, expressed disapproval of Russia's diplomatic relationship with Iran and Hamas, described Russia's stance at the UN as "completely unacceptable" to Israel, suggested that Russia was "standing in solidarity with South Africa" against Israel, and warned that recent Russian behaviour risked losing Israeli sympathy for Russia. In response, the Russian foreign ministry summoned her for "unacceptable" comments and stated that this was a "an extremely unsuccessful start" to Halperin's diplomatic posting. Halperin nevertheless noted that cooperation between Israel and Russia continued on the release of hostages and expressed Israel's desire to remain off Russia's unfriendly countries list.

In April 2024, Russia condemned the Israeli bombing of the Iranian embassy in Damascus, describing it as a "political killing". However, Russia urged both sides to show restraint in its response to the situation. Russia later declined to condemn the 2024 Iranian strikes in Israel in response, with Zakharova noting that Israel did not condemn Ukrainian attacks on Russian territory. Russian Security Council Secretary Nikolai Patrushev, in a call with Israel's National Security Advisor Tzachi Hanegbi, urged Iran and Israel to settle their differences through diplomatic means.

In May 2024, the Israeli ambassador to Russia attended the inauguration ceremony of President Putin, despite it being boycotted by most Western countries.

In July 2024, Russia condemned Israel's killing of Hezbollah commander Fuad Shukr during the 2024 Haret Hreik airstrike in Lebanon and the assassination of Ismail Haniyeh, the political leader of Hamas, in Iran. However, Russia urged Iran against any subsequent attacks that would cause civilian casualties in Israel, due to the number of Russian citizens living in Israel.

In September 2024, Lavrov stated that Russia had "good relations" with Israel and affirmed Russia's "full commitment to security and fundamental interests of the State of Israel", while criticising Israeli actions in Gaza, Lebanon and Iran.

In September 2024, Netanyahu approved the transfer of its decommissioned MIM-104 Patriot air defense missiles to the United States, which were subsequently transferred to Ukraine. However, Israel informed Russia in advance of the move and insisted it was only returning the system to the U.S.

In November 2024, Israeli Strategic Affairs Minister Ron Dermer visited Russia as part of efforts to reach a ceasefire with Hezbollah. Foreign Minister Gideon Sa'ar also suggested a potential Russian role in reducing Iranian arms supplies via Syria to Hezbollah in order to achieve a ceasefire.

==== 2025 and beyond ====
Relations between Israel and Russia improved after Donald Trump became President of the United States in 2025.

In February 2025, Israel joined Russia in voting against a UN General Assembly resolution reaffirming Ukraine's territorial integrity.

In February 2025, Israel lobbied the United States to allow Russia to maintain military bases in Syria, as a counterweight to Turkish influence there.

In March 2025, Russia invited Israel to attend its 2025 Moscow Victory Day Parade, despite excluding most Western nations.

In May 2025, Netanyahu and Putin had their first phone call since December 2023 to offer Victory Day congratulations, where Netanyahu thanked Putin for helping secure the release of an Israel-Russian dual national from Hamas captivity, and the two countries "reaffirmed their determination to uphold the truth about the events of the Second World War and to oppose attempts to revise its outcomes or falsify history".

In June 2025, Putin condemned Israeli strikes on Iran as part of Twelve-Day War. However, Russia did not send any military aid to Iran during the Twelve-Day War.

In August 2025, Russia condemned and filed a formal complaint to Israel after Israeli settlers attacked a diplomatic vehicle, belonging to Russia's representation to the Palestinian Authority on 30 July near Giv'at Asaf, east of Ramallah. Maria Zakharova, spokeswoman of the Ministry of Foreign Affairs, stated that the attack is "a gross violation of the Vienna Convention on Diplomatic Relations of 1961” and expressed "bewilderment and disapproval" that the attack “occurred with the connivance of Israeli military personnel”.

In August 2025, Netanyahu spoke with Putin with the aim of reducing tensions between the United States and Russia over the Russo-Ukrainian War.

In November 2025, it was revealed that Russia continued to be Israel's biggest supplier of fuel and one of its biggest suppliers of crude oil during the Gaza war. Russia "continued to ship fossil fuels to Israel even after the International Court of Justice (ICJ) ruled that Israel's actions are unlawful, and a UN Commission concluded that Israel has committed genocide in Gaza". This led to accusations that it was complicit in genocide.

During a Knesset speech in December 2025, Netanyahu noted that he speaks regularly with Putin, stating that "this dialogue has significance for protecting security interests, including on our northern border".

In January 2026, Netanyahu sent a message via Putin to Iran that Israel did not seek war with Iran and would not escalate the existing conflict between the two nations.

As well as fuel, Russia continued exporting grain to Israel. In April 2026, Israel allowed a Russian ship carrying 43,500 metric tons of stolen Ukrainian wheat to unload in Haifa, despite protest from Ukraine's government.

At a United Nations Security Council session, Russia's permanent representative, Vassily Nebenzia, articulated Moscow's official stance on the escalating situation in Lebanon. He stated that Russia unequivocally condemns Israel's military actions in the country. Regarding the ceasefire agreement reached the previous April between Israel and Lebanon, Nebenzia characterized it as devoid of any practical value, describing it merely as "a cover for further Israeli aggression." In his remarks, the Russian envoy further stressed that Moscow demands the immediate withdrawal of Israeli forces from Lebanese territory — a step he described as essential for establishing a genuine and lasting ceasefire.

== Regional cooperation ==
Historically, Israel and Russia share cordial relations. Recently, Russia's improvement of relations with Israel coincided with Israel's efforts to build relations with the Gulf states under Abraham Accords. Israel's relations with Egypt, Saudi Arabia, and the United Arab Emirates came at an opposition towards both Iranian and Turkish influence in the region. Russia is involved in proxy wars with Turkey in Caucasus, North Africa and the Middle East. In addition, Russia allows Israel to do airstrikes against pro-Iranian groups in Syria.

Israel has largely sided with Russia against Turkey in recent years, notably by how Russia and Israel support Khalifa Haftar against Turkey-backed Government of National Accord, Israel's silent support for Russian intervention in Syria in opposition to Iran and Turkey, although Israel objects Russia's relations with Turkey while Israel maintains relations with Azerbaijan, a strong Turkish ally, to go against Iran. In 2018, Israel had also suggested, alongside Saudi Arabia and the United Arab Emirates, that U.S. president Donald Trump should improve relations with Russia and rethink sanctions relating to the Russo-Ukrainian War. Although Putin continues to have positive relations with Erdogan. Both Turkey and Israel were involved in rival mediation efforts between Ukraine and Russia in early 2022, but these were not coordinated.

When a normalization agreement was signed by Serbia and Kosovo in 2020, Russia and Israel openly supported the deal which would allow Serbia to move embassy to Jerusalem while Kosovo would establish relations with Israel. In response, In August 2020, following the Abraham Accords which Israel normalised relations with the United Arab Emirates and Bahrain, Russia did not endorse the deal but quietly approved the efforts by Israel to normalize the relations. Iran does not recognize Kosovo as a sovereign state, and both Iran and Turkey opposed both moves.

However, Russia continues to have strong economic and political relations with both Iran and Turkey, and Russia continues to be skeptical about Israel's special relations with the United States. Russia supports two-state solution for Israeli–Palestinian conflict and has relations with several Palestinian political parties. Russia does not consider Hamas as a terrorist organization and continues to diplomatically negotiate with them. Iran, Russia, and Turkey all voted in favor of United Nations General Assembly resolution ES-10/L.22 to declare the status of Jerusalem as Israel's capital as "null and void."

China's growing influence in the region has also complicated Israeli and Russian cooperation. Chinese backed deal to restore relations between Iran and Saudi Arabia was welcomed in the region and in Russia, while less so in Israeli and Western circles. Hamas proposed to see Egypt, Qatar, Russia, and Turkey as the guarantors of security for the Gaza Strip but it was rejected by Israel, further showing deterioration of ties between Israel and Russia.

== Expatriate communities ==
=== Russian language in Israel ===
The native Russian-speaking population of Israel is the world's third-largest population of Russian native-speakers living outside the former Soviet Union territories, and the highest as a proportion of the population. The number of native Russian-speaking Israelis numbers around 1.5 million citizens.

=== Russian citizens living in Israel ===
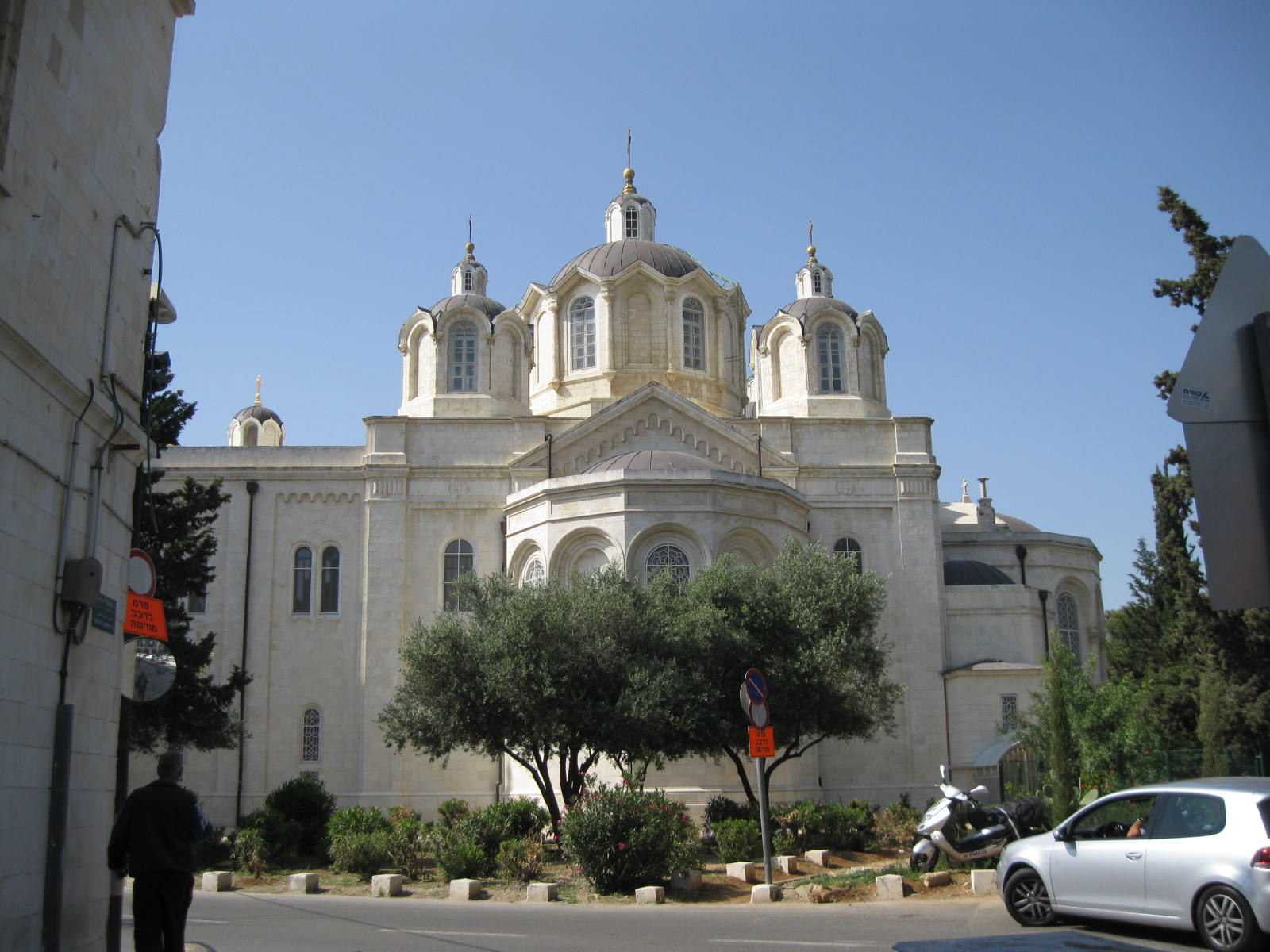
The Russian Compound in Jerusalem

Hundreds of thousands of Russian-Israeli citizens live in Israel. During Russian elections, the Russian government sets up polling stations across many Israeli cities as well as smaller towns, in order to enable the Russian citizens who are living in Israel to cast their vote. During the 2012 Russian presidential election, hundreds of thousands of Russian-Israelis could cast their vote in Israel.

In the 2018 Russian presidential election, Vladimir Putin was the most popular candidate within Russian Israeli voters, winning 72.62% of the vote in Israel, with Ksenia Sobchak coming in second place with 13.42%. However, despite Russia setting up 14 polling stations in Israel, voter turnout was particularly low, with less than 10% of eligible Russian Israeli dual citizens in Israel showing up to vote on the day.

The political party United Russia has opened an overseas branch in Israel. The Liberal Democratic Party of Russia also previously had an overseas branch in Israel.

==== Victory Day in Israel ====
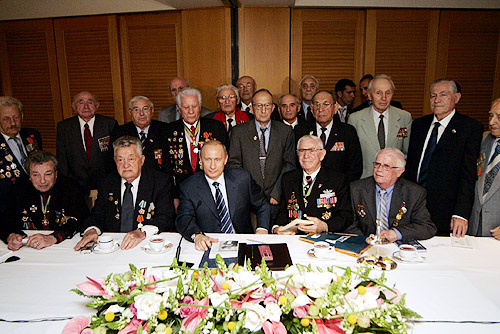
Putin meets with Red Army veterans in Israel.

Israel hosts the most extensive Victory Day celebrations outside the former Soviet Union. Due to the large number of Red Army veterans who retired to Israel from former Soviet countries, the Russian government and military regularly send delegations to meet with the Red Army veterans associations in Israel, as well as to take part in the annual Victory Day events.

=== Israeli community of Moscow ===
Moscow has the largest Israeli expatriate community in the world; 80,000 Israeli citizens live in the city as of 2014, almost all of them native Russian-speakers. Many Israeli cultural events are hosted for the community, and many live part of the year in Israel. To cater to the Israeli community, Israeli cultural centres are located in Moscow, Saint Petersburg, Novosibirsk and Yekaterinburg. There are 60 flights a week between Tel Aviv and Moscow.

== Military collaboration ==
In 1991, the Soviet Union offered to sell Israel its Mikoyan MiG-31 aircraft and S-300 missile system, although the deal never materialised.

In 2004, a three-way deal was signed between Israel, Russia and India: Israel supplied the $1.1 billion EL/W-2090 radar to the Indian Air Force, with the radar fitted onto the Ilyushin Il-76 platform by Russia.

On 6 September 2010, Russia and Israel signed a five-year military agreement.

In December 2019, Israel revealed it had an agreement with Russia not to sell arms to Ukraine and Georgia, in exchange for Russia refraining from selling arms to Iran.

=== Drones ===
In confidential emails from private intelligence firm Stratfor leaked by WikiLeaks in 2016, the Georgian government believed that during the 2008 Russo-Georgian War, Israel provided Russia with the data link codes for Georgia's drone fleet which Israel had sold them, allowing Russia to hack them and force crash them in exchange for Russian intelligence on the Tor-M1 missile systems it had sold Iran.

In April 2009, Russia purchased its first package of drones from Israel (the Bird Eye-400, eight I-View Mk150 and two Searcher Mk.2 UAVs). The deal was worth $53 million. In a second deal, at the end of 2009, Russia purchased an additional 36 drones from Israel, in a deal worth $100 million.

In October 2010, in a third deal, Russia purchased an additional $400 million of drones from Israel Aerospace Industries. The Israeli drones are to be assembled in Russia. The production of the Russian-Israeli drones began in 2012, and delivery to the Russian military is scheduled for 2014.

In 2015, one of the drones was reportedly shot down by the Ukrainian military near the city of Donetsk, Ukraine.

In September 2015, the Russian Army purchased another $300 million package of drones from Israel, its fourth purchase of Israeli drones.

== Russian tourism to Israel ==
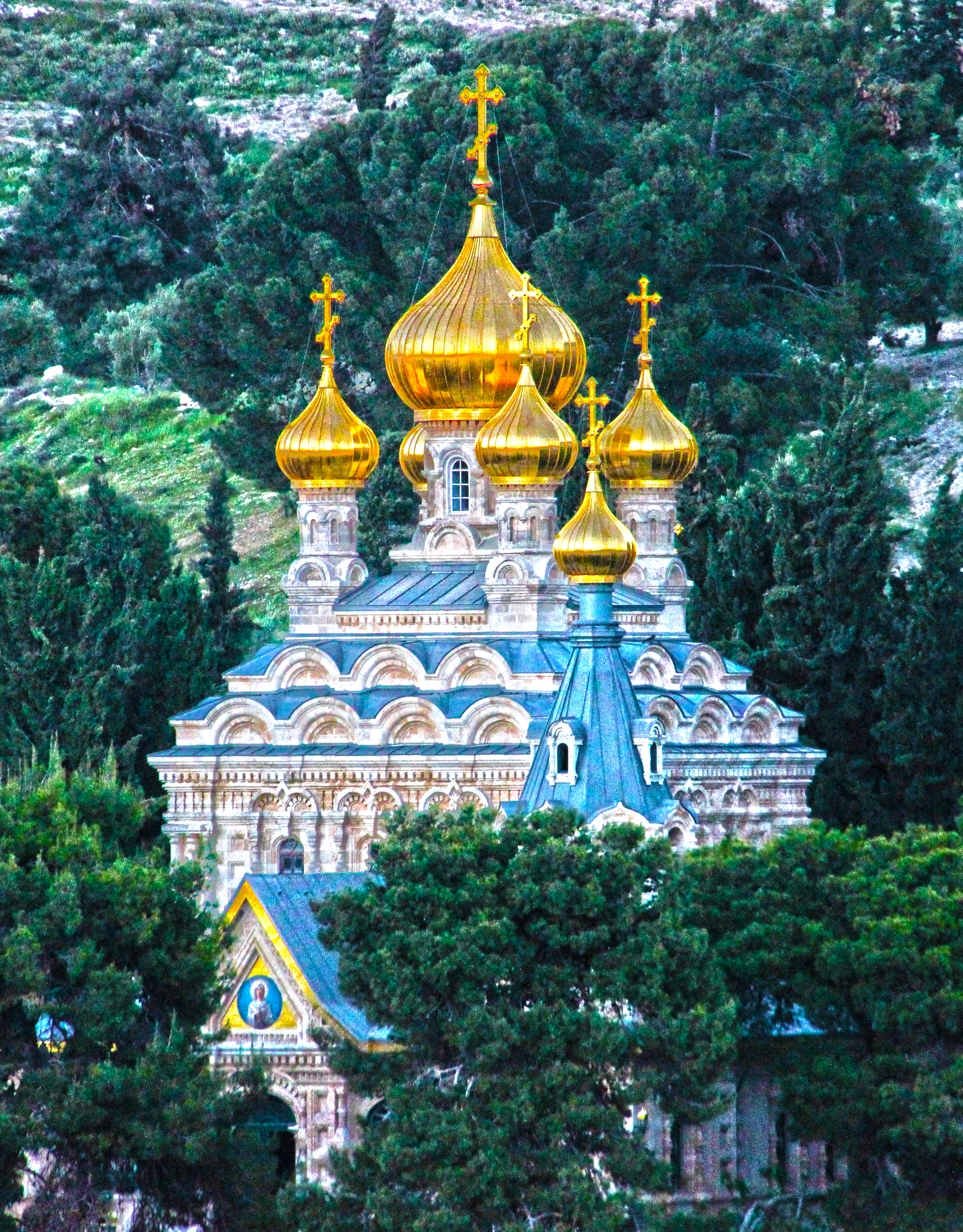
The Church of Mary Magdalene in Jerusalem, a popular pilgrimage site

Israel became in recent years a destination for Russian tourists. The city of Tel Aviv in particular is a popular destination in Russia due to its ease for Russian-speakers, warm weather, and beaches. According to polls, Russian tourist satisfaction after visiting Israel was found to be significantly higher than the average, compared with lower satisfaction ratings from tourists from other countries visiting Israel. Almost 500,000 Russian tourists visited Israel in 2014. However, in 2015, Russian tourist numbers to Israel fell dramatically due to the economic crisis in Russia and the fall in the value of the ruble. The 2015 economic crisis in Russia precipitated a crisis in Israel's tourism industry, because Russians represented the second largest share of Israel's tourists (after Americans). The level of tourism from Russia to Israel continued to fall significantly in 2015. By 2018, after years of downturn, Russian tourist numbers to Israel had begun to slightly recover. Russian tourists were once again the second largest body of foreign tourists in Israel and were particularly important for the resort town of Eilat.

Over 400,000 pilgrims from Russia visited Israel in 2015–2016, said Patriarch Kirill of Moscow. Patriarch Kirill said that the fact that "people in Israel speak Russian creates a special atmosphere for our pilgrims, and they often feel at home in Israel". Speaking about the life of the Jewish community in Russia, he cited the chief rabbi of Russia: "He has told me many times that he does not know any other such place than Russia, where Christians and Jews have such good relations".

== Russian oil supplies to Israel ==
As of 2014, Russia is Israel's largest supplier of crude oil (alongside Kazakhstan and Azerbaijan). As of 2016, Russia was Israel's main supplier of oil. Russia continued to be Israel's biggest supplier of fuel and one of its biggest suppliers of crude oil during the Gaza war from 2023 to 2025.

== Israel–Russia visa-free agreement ==
In 2008, Israel and Russia signed the visa-free agreement, allowing mutual visa-free travel between the two countries. Immigrants from Russia and other former Soviet republics account for a significant proportion of Israel's citizens, meaning that visits to friends and relatives in Russia are likely to be facilitated.

== Customs union talks ==
Israel plans to enter a free-trade agreement with Russia. The Customs Union, bringing together Belarus, Kazakhstan and Russia, and Israel have launched an exploratory committee to study the prospects for the creation of a free trade zone, the Eurasian Economic Commission (EEC – a single permanent regulatory body of the Customs Union) reported in March 2014.

== Encrypted communication line ==
Russia and Israel have agreed to install a direct encrypted communication network, to facilitate communications between the Russian President and Israeli Prime Minister. One analyst says: "Russia feels very close to the Israeli leadership... The Russians want to speak to Israel without anyone eavesdropping."

== Medical collaboration ==
=== Joint training ===
Israel and Russia partake in joint medical training of specialists. The Moscow Government has implemented a training program for metropolitan doctors and nurses to train in the leading Israeli hospitals: Hadassah Medical Center, Tel Aviv Sourasky Medical Center, Sheba Medical Center, and Ramat Aviv Medical Center. Several hundred Russian medical specialists from Moscow hospitals are trained in Israel each year.

=== Hadassah Medical Center ===
Beginning in 2018, Israel's Hadassah Medical Center, in agreement with the mayor of Moscow, opened a branch in Skolkovo, becoming the first foreign hospital to open in Russia. The Hadassah project in Russia was estimated at $40.2 million, of which about $26.4 million will go to equip the center with equipment. In addition, $3.2 million will be spent on educational activities. It is planned that 10% of the income generated by Israel's Hadassah medical center in Skolkovo will be directed to research activities in the field of oncology.

== Scientific collaboration agreements ==
=== Space ===
In 2011, Israel and Russia signed the Space Co-operation Agreement. The framework agreement is meant to develop joint research programs and other collaborations in areas like astrophysical and planetary research, space biology and medicine, navigational satellites and launching services and technology.

=== Nuclear technology ===
In 2013, the Israeli and Russian government signed agreements to collaborate on nuclear imaging and the development of radioactive materials for dental treatments. Although the agreement is limited to medical treatments, it could form the basis for wider collaboration for ventures between the two countries in nuclear technology.

=== Technology incubators ===
In the field of technology incubators, collaborative projects are being establish between the two states. Rusnano, the Russian government's vehicle for investments in nanotechnology, has established a branch in Israel, with the aim of setting up a fund for investment in Israeli nanotechnology ventures. Similarly, Russia's Skolkovo innovation center has established a branch in Israel, the Israel-Skolkovo Gateway/Center (IsraelSK), which involves raising private capital and government grants leveraging for Israeli and Russian start-up companies.

In 2016, Igor Drozdev, chairman of the board of the Skolkovo Foundation, signed a cooperation agreement with the mayor of Yokneam, with the aim of collaboration in the development of technology between the two countries.

In 2018, Yandex opened a computer science school in Israel for local students, in collaboration with Tel Aviv University's department of Computer Science. The school subsidized by Yandex, which will teach 50 Israeli students a year, will focus primarily in "machine learning". Joseph Klafter, president of Tel Aviv University, said: "The new joint educational program will help develop the IT sphere and national economies of both Russia and Israel."

Plekhanov Russian University of Economics hold a joint course in blockchain development with the Israeli School of IT and Israel's HackerU.

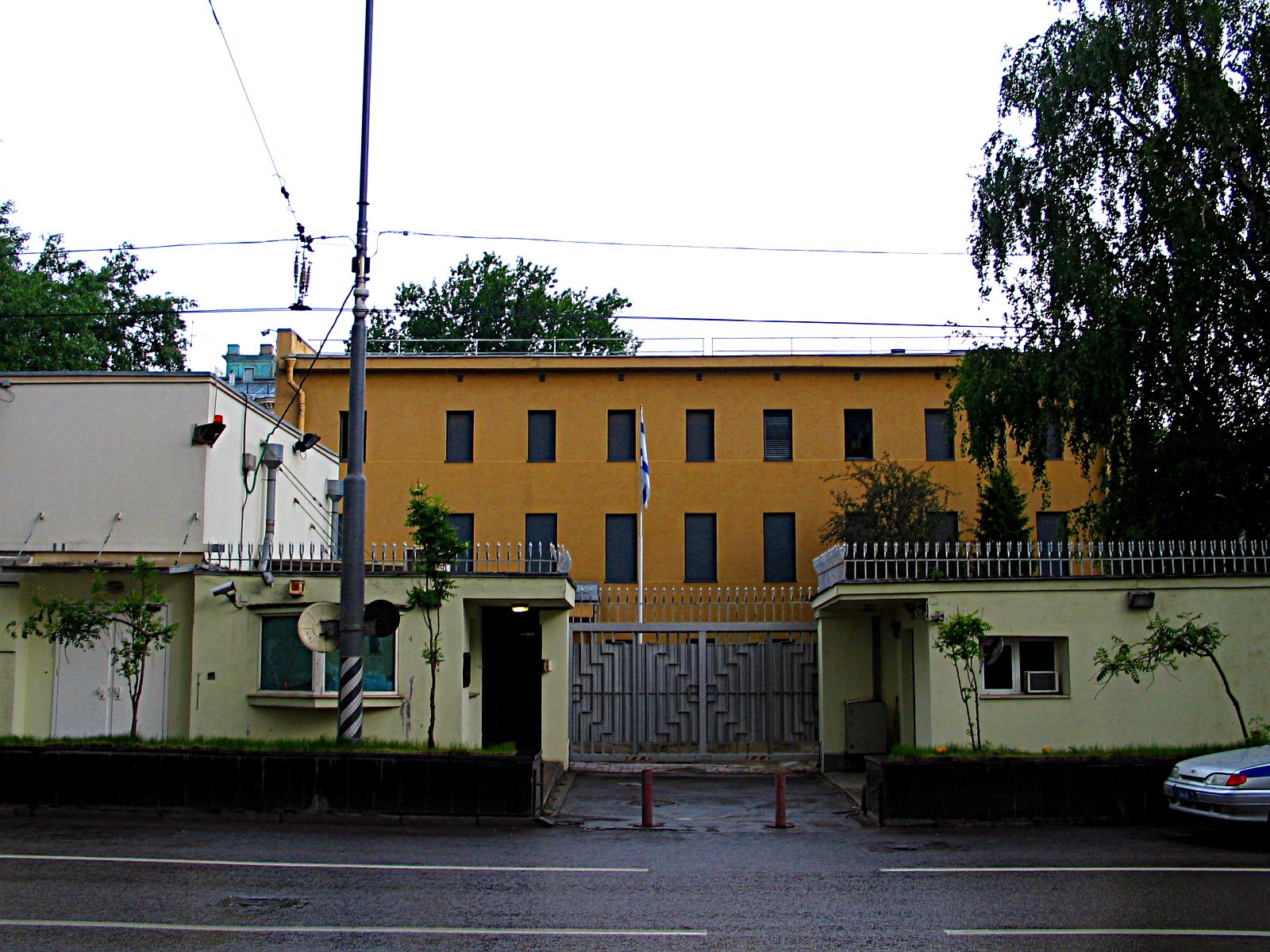
Embassy of Israel in Moscow

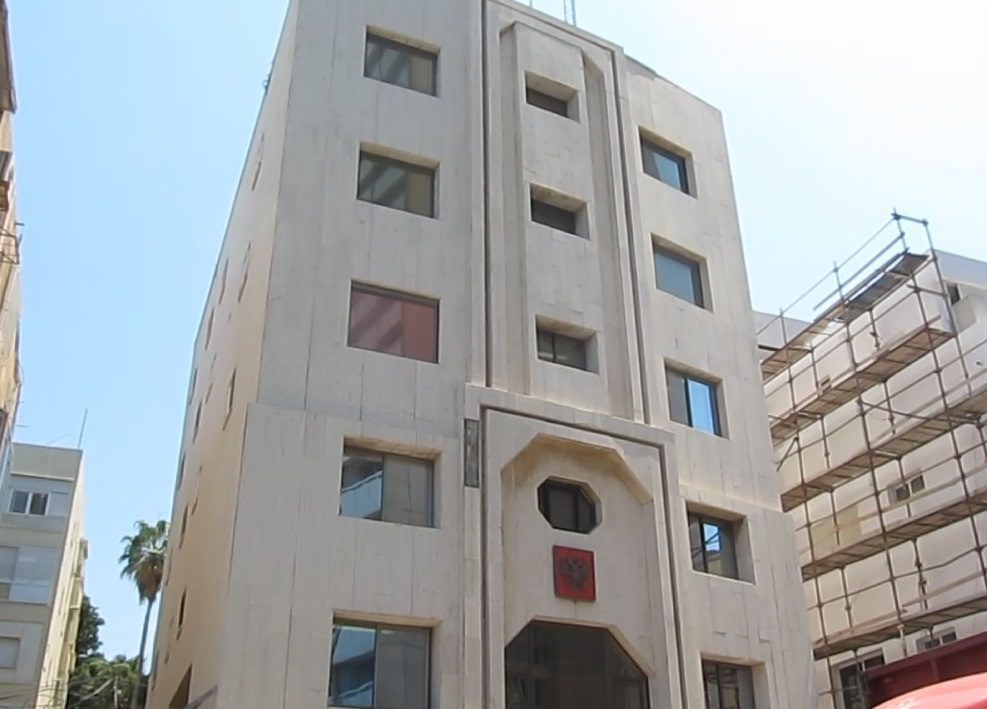
Embassy of Russia in Tel Aviv

== See also ==
- Comparisons between the Gaza war and the Russo-Ukrainian war
- International recognition of Israel
- Soviet Union and the Arab–Israeli conflict
- History of the Jews in Russia
- Jewish Autonomous Oblast
- Russia and the Arab–Israeli conflict
- Palestine-Russia relations
- Antisemitism in Russia
- Antisemitism in the Soviet Union
- Antisemitism in the Russian Empire
- Russian people in Israel
- Russian Jews in Israel
- Russian language in Israel
- Church of Mary Magdalene
- Russian Compound
