= Embassy of Russia, Tel Aviv =

Embassy of Russia in Tel Aviv
- Посольство России в Израиле (Russian) שגרירות רוסיה בישראל (Hebrew)
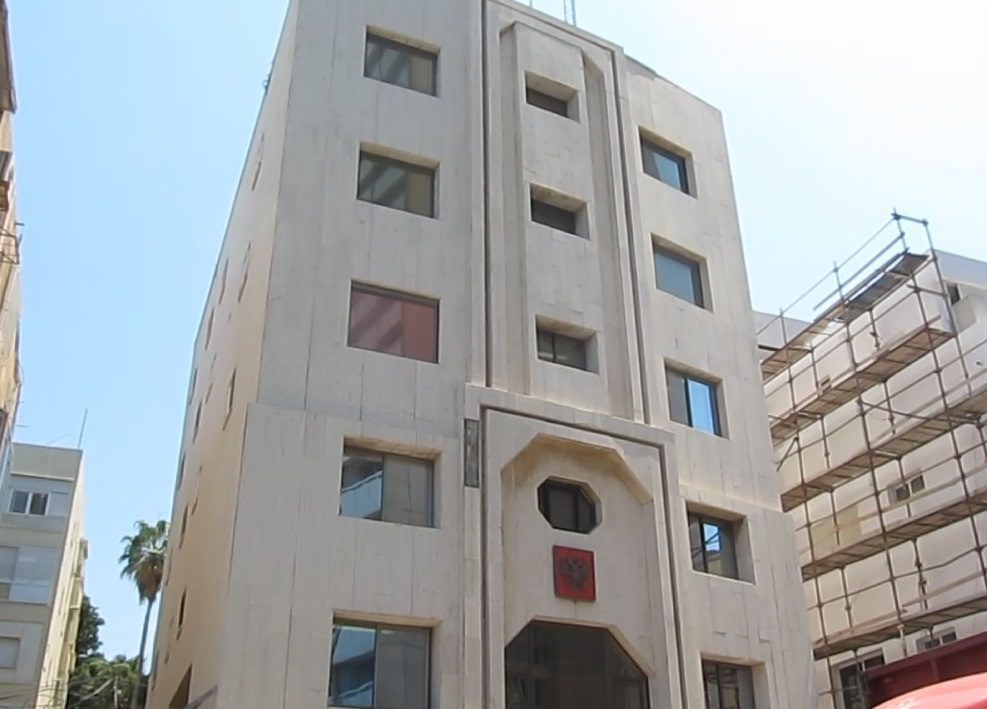
- Location: Tel Aviv, Israel
- Address: 120 Yarkon St., Tel Aviv
- Coordinates: 32°04′53″N 34°46′07″E
- Opened: June 26, 1948 (1st time); April 3, 1991 (2nd time)
- Closed: June 10, 1967
- Ambassador: Anatoliy Viktorov
- Website: israel.mid.ru

Embassy of Russia in Tel Aviv (Russian: Посольство России в Израиле, romanized: Posol'stvo Rossii v Izraile; Hebrew: שגרירות רוסיה בישראל, romanized: Shagrirut Rusya beYisra'el) is the official diplomatic mission of the Russian Federation in the State of Israel. The embassy was originally opened in 1948, was closed between 1967 and 1991, and has since been reopened and is currently functioning.

== Background ==
The Russian Empire established the Russian Consulate General in Jerusalem in December 1858.

During World War I, the Russians and Ottomans were at war with each other, and as such the Russian delegation at the consulate was forced to relocate to Egypt. Following the October Revolution in 1917, the Soviets assumed all control over Russian foreign affairs. Due to their enmity against the British Empire, they did not view British control of Mandatory Palestine highly, and therefore did not reopen this consulate.

== History ==
The Soviet Union officially recognized Israel on May 17, 1948, and subsequently opened its embassy in Israel a month later. That embassy was located at the Levin House, which is still nicknamed the "Russian Embassy House" today.

In 1953, the Attack on the Soviet Legation in Tel Aviv was carried out by the anti-Soviet Jewish organization Kingdom of Israel. This incident significantly soured relations between the two nations, though diplomatic relations still continued for the time. The embassy was relocated later that year to Ramat Gan, and remained until the Six-Day War in 1967, which officially severed diplomatic relations between the two.

A thaw took place under the leadership of Mikhail Gorbachev. A consular mission was established in August 1987, and on 30 September 1990 this resulted in the opening of consulates, and the appointment of a consul general. On 3 January 1991 diplomatic relations were officially restored, and on 18 October 1991 the consulate general was upgraded to an embassy. Alexander Bovin was appointed as the new ambassador, and presented his credentials on 23 December 1991. The current embassy is on HaYarkon Street.

On 24 February 2022, hundreds of Israelis gathered outside the Russian embassy to oppose the Russian invasion of Ukraine, where they denounced Putin and called on the Israeli government to give a tougher stance. Similar protests again occurred in early March as demonstrators called on the government to accept more Ukrainian refugees and send military support to Ukraine, including Israel's Iron Dome defense systems.

== List of ambassadors ==
Name	Title	Appointment	Termination	Notes
Alexander Bovin	Ambassador	25 December 1991	24 March 1997	
Mikhail Bogdanov	Ambassador	24 March 1997	1 February 2002	
Gennady Tarasov	Ambassador	1 February 2002	31 January 2007	
Pyotr Stegniy	Ambassador	31 January 2007	8 July 2011	
Sergey Yakovlev	Ambassador	8 July 2011	10 July 2015	
Aleksandr Shein	Ambassador	10 July 2015	5 April 2018	
Anatoly Viktorov	Ambassador	5 April 2018		

== See also ==
- Israel–Russia relations
- Embassy of Israel, Moscow
- List of diplomatic missions of Russia
- List of diplomatic missions in Israel
