= Mikhail Bodrov =

Russian diplomat

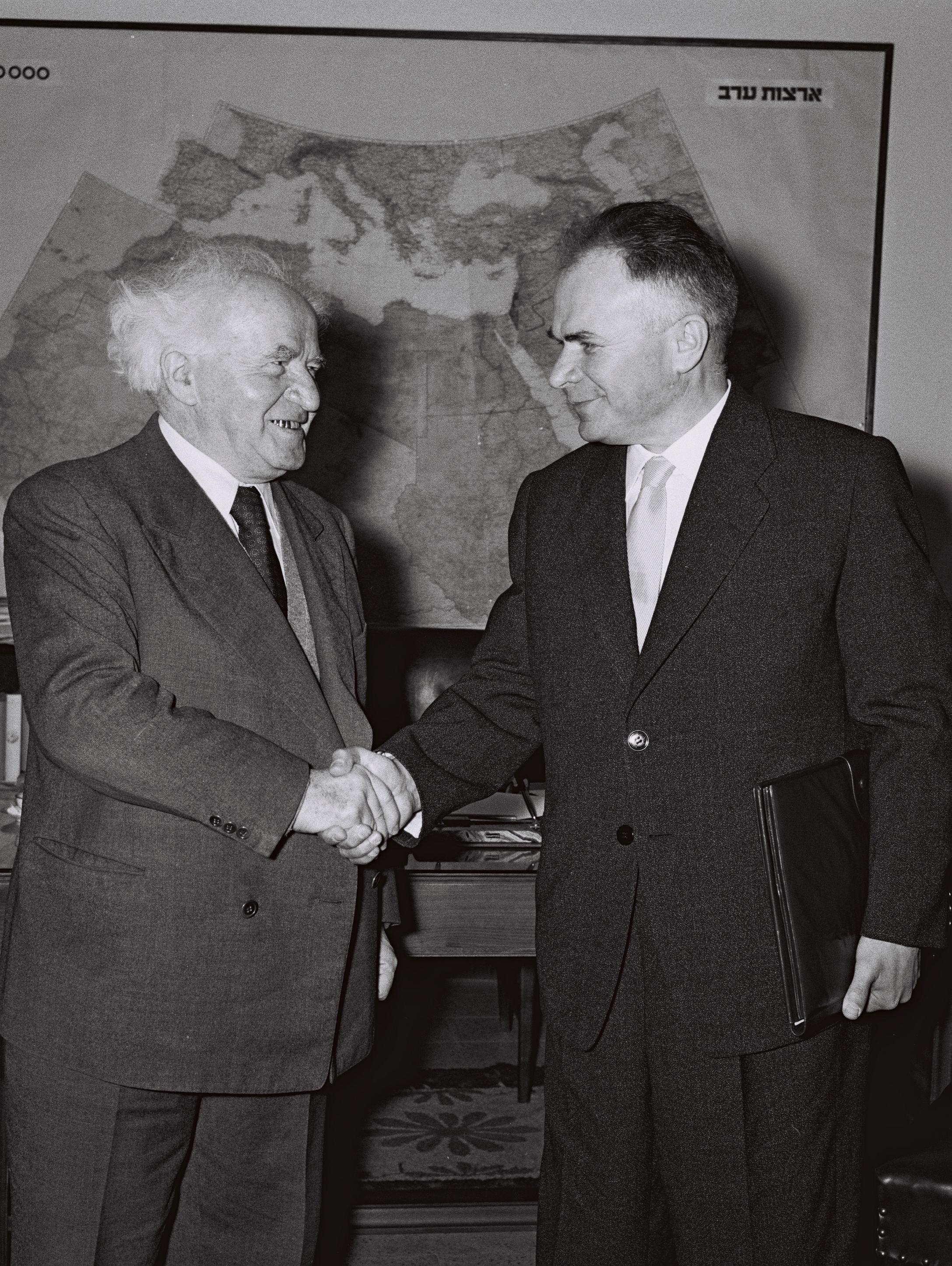
- Newly appointed Russian Ambassador to Israel Mikhail Bodrov (right) is greeted by Israeli Prime minister David Ben-Gurion, Jerusalem.
- Born: Mikhail Fyodorovich Bodrov; 1903
- Died: 1988 (aged 84–85)
- Occupation: Diplomat
- Years active: 1946–1970
- Known for: Israel–Russia relations

Mikhail Fyodorovich Bodrov (in Russian: Михаил Фёдорович Бодров; 1903–1988) was a Soviet diplomat, Ambassador extraordinary and plenipotentiary.

== Biography ==
Mikhail Bodrov was a member of the All-Union Communist Party (bolsheviks). He graduated from the Moscow Institute of Finance and started diplomatic work in 1946.

Bodrov served as Soviet Union's Ambassador Extraordinary and Plenipotentiary to the following countries of the world:

- Bulgaria (August 6, 1948 to January 27, 1954)
- Israel (January 21, 1958 to October 15, 1964)
- Kuwait (September 24, 1966 to July 9, 1970)

In 1954–1958 he served as Deputy Head of the Ministry of Foreign Affairs of the USSR; in 1965–1966 as Executive Secretary of the ministry.

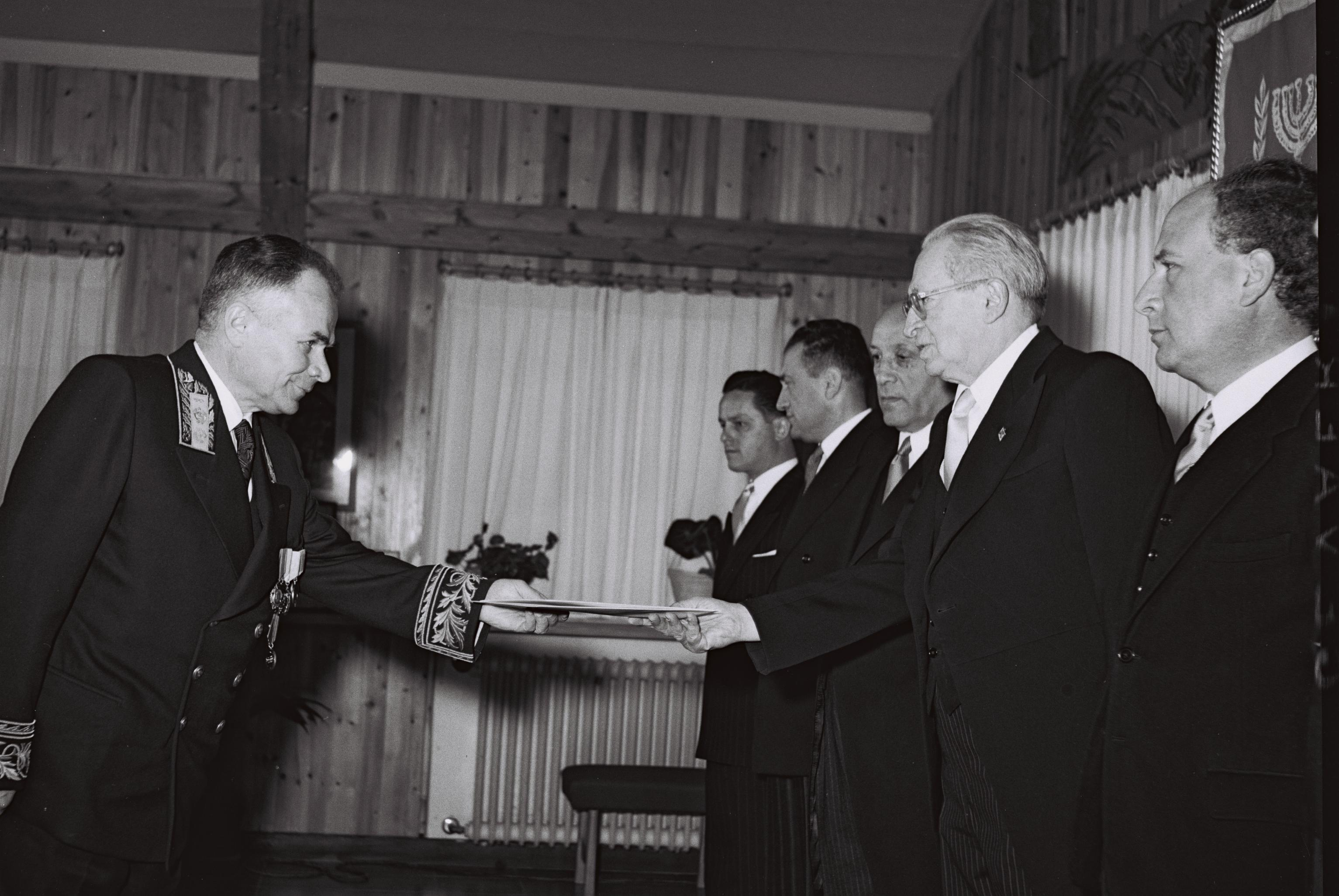
Mikhail Bodrov presents his credentials to President Yitzhak Ben-Zvi at Beit HaNassi, Jerusalem

During his work in Israel Bodrov took part in the so-called “Orange Deal” (in Russian: Апельсиновая сделка), formally known as Agreement #593 (“On the sale of Soviet state property to Israel”), concluded on October 17, 1964. The agreement was signed on the Israeli side by Foreign Minister Golda Meir and Finance Minister Pinchas Sapir. The agreement was nicknamed so, because Israel agreed to pay not in money (of which it had none), but in oranges from Jaffa and textiles.

In March 1963, Mikhail Bodrov wrote to Deputy Foreign Minister Sergei Lapin:

Seeking wider ties with our country, the ruling circles of Israel expect to use the expansion of cultural, scientific ties and tourism to strengthen intelligence and subversive activities and conduct Zionist propaganda. In our opinion, it is inexpedient to maintain the tourism of Soviet citizens to Israel and to organize a wide exchange of cultural, scientific and other delegations.

— Mikhail Bodrov, BBC News

Bodrov met and corresponded with Korney Chukovsky.

He retired in 1970 and died in 1988.
