= List of ambassadors of Russia to Israel =

Ambassador of the Russian Federation to the State of Israel
- посол Российской Федерации в Израиле
- Emblem of the Russian Foreign Ministry

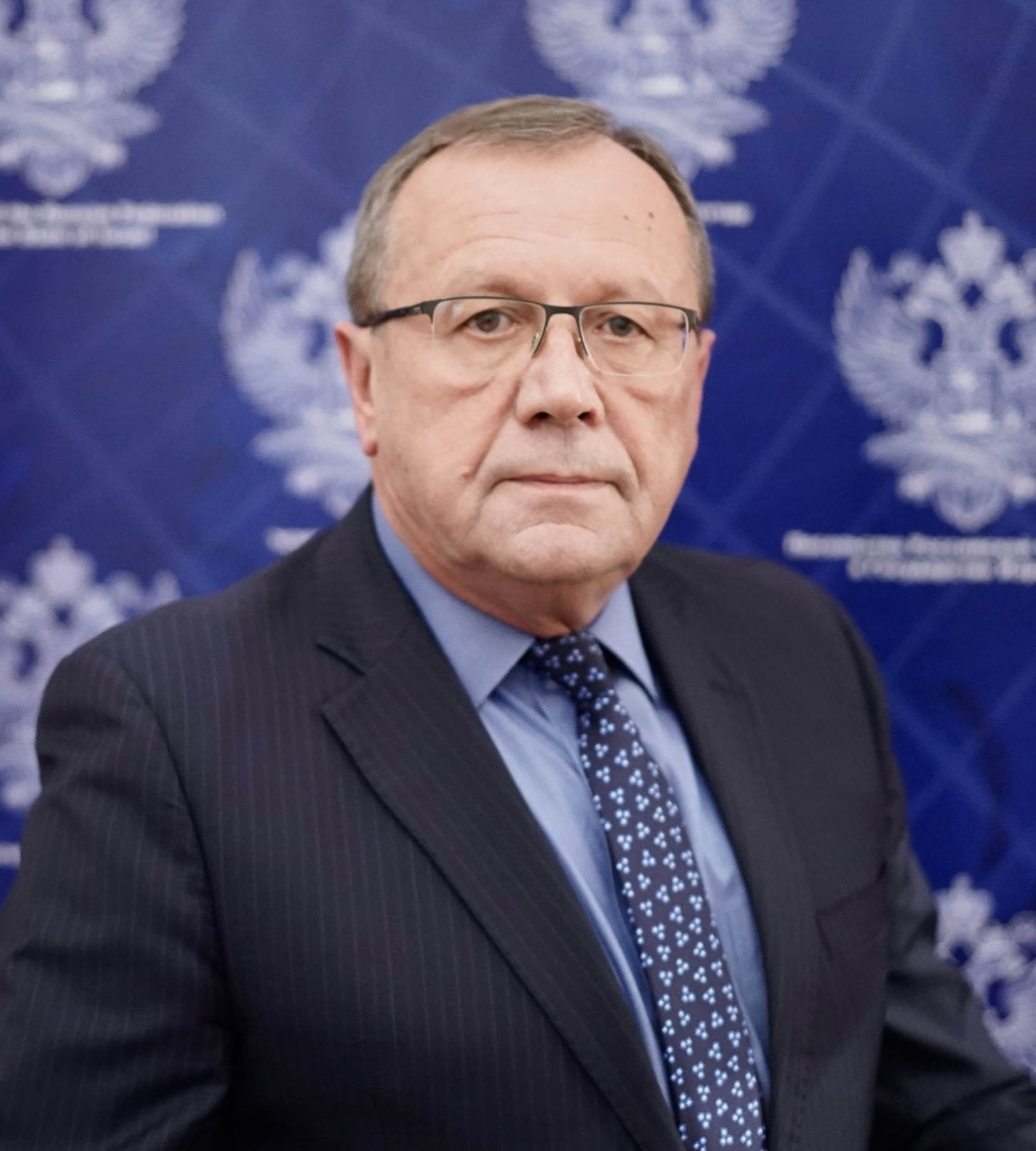
- Incumbent; Anatoly Viktorov since 5 April 2018
- Ministry of Foreign Affairs; Embassy of Russia in Tel Aviv
- Style: His Excellency
- Reports to: Minister of Foreign Affairs
- Seat: Tel Aviv
- Appointer: President of Russia
- Term length: At the pleasure of the president
- Website: Russian Embassy in Tel Aviv

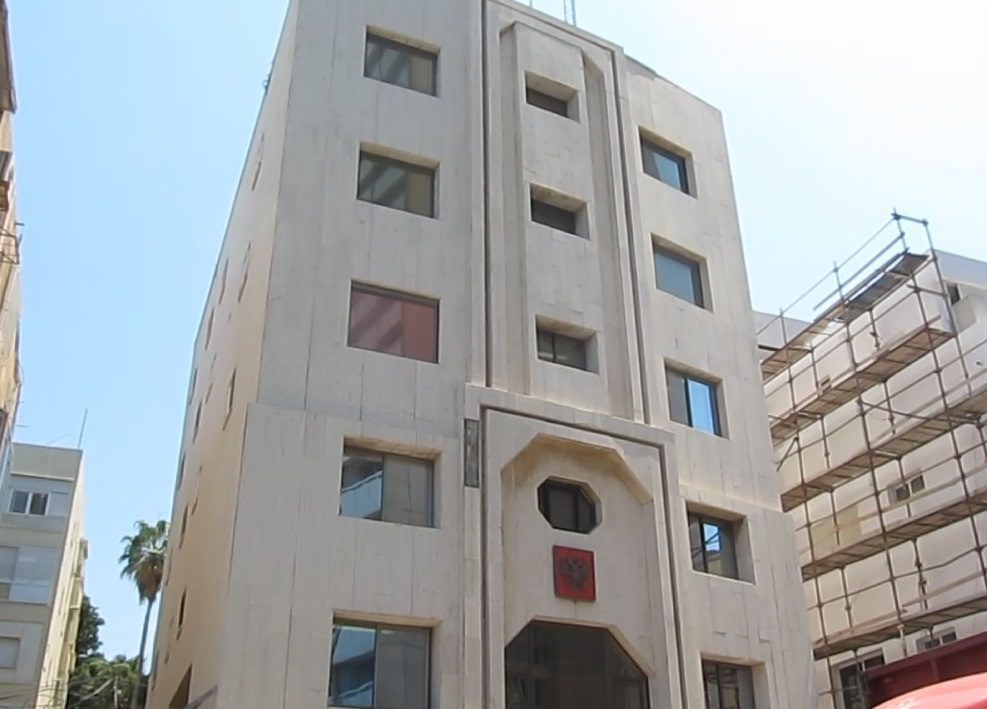
Russian embassy in Tel Aviv

The ambassador extraordinary and plenipotentiary of the Russian Federation to the State of Israel is the official representative of the president and the government of the Russian Federation to the prime minister and the government of Israel.

The ambassador and his staff work at large in the Embassy of Russia in Tel Aviv. There is a consulate general in Haifa. The post of Russian ambassador to Israel is currently held by Anatoly Viktorov, incumbent since 5 April 2018.

== History of diplomatic relations ==
Diplomatic relations between the Soviet Union and Israel were formalised in May 1948, not long after the Israeli Declaration of Independence. The first envoy, Pavel Yershov, was appointed on 26 June 1948, and presented his credentials on 17 August that year. Diplomatic relations were briefly suspended by the Soviet government with Yershov's recall in February 1953, but were restored in July that year, and Aleksandr Abramov was appointed the new envoy in August. Relations were further strengthened the following year with the conversion of the missions to the level of embassies.

In June 1967 the Soviet Union once more broke off relations, over the Six-Day War. For the next thirty years diplomatic relations were officially broken, until a thaw took place under the leadership of Mikhail Gorbachev. A consular mission was established in August 1987, and on 30 September 1990 this resulted in the opening of consulates, and the appointment of a consul general. On 3 January 1991 diplomatic relations were officially restored, and on 18 October 1991 the consulate general was upgraded to an embassy. Alexander Bovin was appointed as the new ambassador, and presented his credentials on 23 December 1991. With the official dissolution of the Soviet Union two days later, Bovin remained in post as representative of the Russian Federation, serving until 1997.

== List of representatives (1948–present) ==
=== Soviet Union to Israel (1948–1991) ===
Name	Title	Appointment	Termination	Notes
Pavel Yershov	Envoy	26 June 1948	11 February 1953	
Aleksandr Abramov	Envoy (before 16 June 1954); Ambassador (after 16 June 1954)	8 August 1953	21 January 1958	
Mikhail Bodrov	Ambassador	21 January 1958	15 October 1964	
Dmitry Chuvakhin	Ambassador	15 October 1964	10 June 1967	
Six Day War - Diplomatic relations interrupted (1967 - 1991)
Alexander Bovin	Ambassador	12 November 1991	25 December 1991	

=== Russian Federation to Israel (1991–present) ===
Name	Title	Appointment	Termination	Notes
Alexander Bovin	Ambassador	25 December 1991	24 March 1997	
Mikhail Bogdanov	Ambassador	24 March 1997	1 February 2002	
Gennady Tarasov	Ambassador	1 February 2002	31 January 2007	
Pyotr Stegniy	Ambassador	31 January 2007	8 July 2011	
Sergey Yakovlev	Ambassador	8 July 2011	10 July 2015	
Aleksandr Shein	Ambassador	10 July 2015	5 April 2018	
Anatoly Viktorov	Ambassador	5 April 2018		
