= Mikhail Bogdanov (diplomat) =

Russian diplomat (born 1952)

- Михаил Богданов
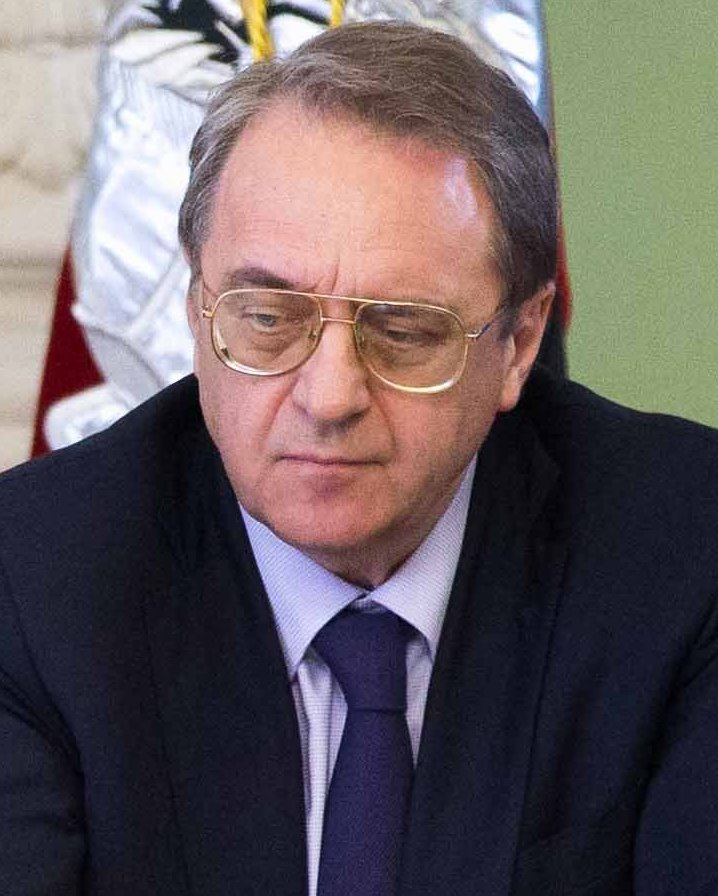
- Bogdanov in 2018

Deputy Minister of Foreign Affairs
- In office 12 June 2011 – 9 July 2025
- President: Dmitry Medvedev; Vladimir Putin

Ambassador of Russia to Egypt
- In office 21 January 2005 – 12 June 2011
- Preceded by: Nikolai Kartuzov
- Succeeded by: Sergei Kirpichenko

Ambassador of Russia to Israel
- In office 24 March 1997 – 1 February 2002
- Preceded by: Alexander Bovin
- Succeeded by: Gennady Tarasov

Personal details
- Born: Mikhail Leonidovich Bogdanov; 2 March 1952 (age 74) Moscow, Soviet Union
- Education: Moscow State Institute of International Relations
- Awards: Order of Honour; Order of Friendship

Mikhail Leonidovich Bogdanov (Note: In this name that follows East Slavic naming customs, the patronymic is Leonidovich and the family name is Bogdanov.) (Russian: Михаил Леонидович Богданов; born 2 March 1952) is a Russian diplomat. He was Deputy Minister of Foreign Affairs of Russia and Special Representative of the President of Russia for the Middle East. He is also Deputy Chairman of the Imperial Orthodox Palestine Society.

== Early life and career ==
Bogdanov graduated from the Moscow State Institute of International Relations (MGIMO) in 1974. As student at MGIMO, he was the captain of the MGIMO basketball team of the Ministry of Foreign Affairs, and, later, he played as a member of the Lokomotiv basketball team. (Note: BC Lokomotiv Moscow was supported by Russian railway workers and existed from 1923 to 1980. It was the dominant club in the USSR before the Great Patriotic War (World War II) but was less dominant afterward, and was relegated to a farm status later becoming the farm club Mineralnye Vody Lokomotiv (Russian: фарм-клуб минераловодский Локомотив), which existed as a farm club until 1994, and was in the Top Division of the Russian Championship, South Division from 1994 to 2003 but moved to Rostov-on-Don in 2003 becoming Lokomotiv Don, and became PBC Lokomotiv Kuban after relocating to Krasnodar in 2009.)

Mikhail Bogdanov worked in the Soviet embassies in South Yemen from 1974 to 1977, Lebanon from 1977 to 1980, and Syria from 1983 to 1989 and again from 1991 to 1994. He was Russian ambassador to Israel from 1997 to 2002, and ambassador to Egypt and concurrent representative to the Arab League from 2005 to 2011. A 1994 leaked diplomatic cable written by Bogdanov revealed that Russian diplomats were completely clueless in the aftermath of the accident that killed Bassel al-Assad.

Mikhail Bogdanov was appointed director of the Department of the Middle East and North Africa at the Ministry of Foreign Affairs in 2002, serving in this position until 2005. He has served as deputy foreign minister since June 2011, special presidential envoy for the Middle East since 23 January 2012, and special presidential envoy for the Middle East and Africa since October 2014. In a November 2015 news conference, Bogdanov said that Russia did not consider Hezbollah a terrorist organization, since it had not committed terrorist acts on Russian soil, and maintained a legitimate presence in the Lebanese government.

During the Syrian Civil War, he acted as an intermediary between the Syrian government and the Syrian opposition based in Turkey. He was allegedly debriefed by Randa Kassis, who is a friend of foreign minister Sergey Lavrov, after she had attended a speech by Donald Trump Jr. for the Fabien Baussart-associated Center of Political and Foreign Affairs think tank in Paris on 11 October 2016, after which she allegedly stated that she could serve as a back door communication link between the Trump administration and president Vladimir Putin.

== Personal life ==
He is married and has a son. In addition to his native Russian, Bogdanov is fluent in Arabic and English.

== Awards ==
- Order of Friendship
- Order of Honour

== See also ==
- Mueller special counsel investigation
