= Embassy of Israel, Moscow =

Diplomatic mission of Israel in Russia

Coordinates: 55°44′01″N 37°37′25″E

שגרירות ישראל במוסקבה Embassy of Israel in Moscow
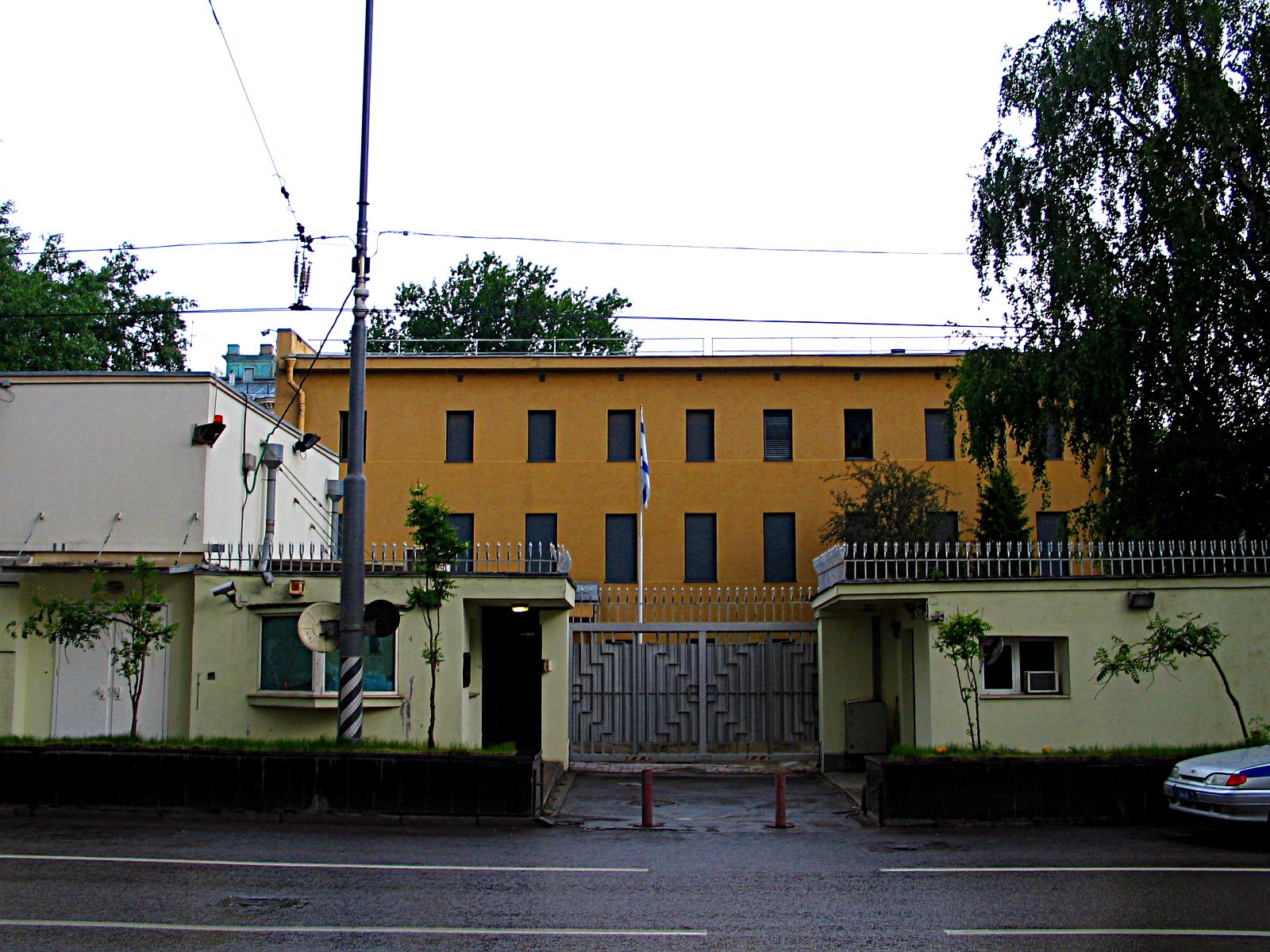
- Location: Moscow

The Embassy of the State of Israel in Moscow is the chief diplomatic mission of Israel in Russia. It is located at 56 Bolshaya Ordynka Street (Russian: ул. Большая Ордынка, 56) in the Yakimanka District of Moscow.

== See also ==
- Israel–Russia relations
- Diplomatic missions in Russia
