= Iran–Kosovo relations =

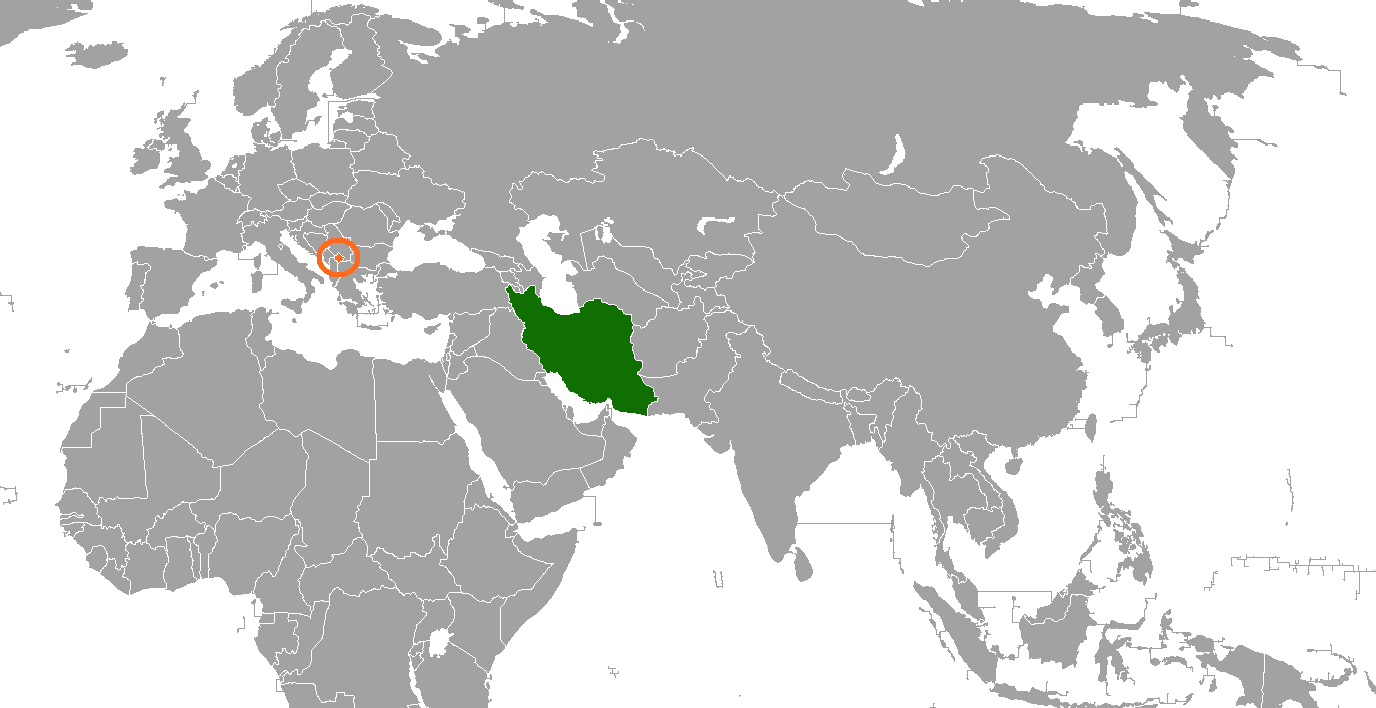

- Iran: Kosovo

Iran–Kosovo relations are foreign relations between Iran and Kosovo. Formal diplomatic relations between two states are non-existent as Iran does not recognize Kosovo as a sovereign state.

== History ==
On 13 March 2008, Iranian president Mahmoud Ahmadinejad said that Iran, after considering the region's issues and conditions, had decided not to recognize the independence of Kosovo.

In early March 2008, Gholamreza Ansari, Ambassador of Iran to Russia, said that "this question has very important aspects. Frankly speaking, the United Nations divided one of its members into two parts, though Article 1244 confirms the territorial integrity of Serbia. This is a very strange event. We think that some countries try to weaken international organizations. Presently, Iran is studying the question of Kosovo's future. Iran ... expresses its concern over the weakening of international organizations".

In September 2011, the Deputy Foreign Minister of Iran, Mohammed Akondzadeh, visited Serbia during the annual NAM council held in Belgrade that year, and declared that Iran did not recognize Kosovo as a sovereign nation.

In April 2012, during a visit in Belgrade, Iranian Deputy Foreign Minister Ramin Mehmanparast said that Iran would adhere to its decision not to recognise the independence of Kosovo.

On 20 April 2026, Government of Kosovo designated Islamic Revolutionary Guard Corps (one of the two millitary forces of Iran) as a terrorist organisation.

== See also ==
- Foreign relations of Iran
- Foreign relations of Kosovo
- Iran–Serbia relations
