= Aleksandr Bovin =

Soviet and Russian journalist, political scientist and diplomat

- Александр Бовин
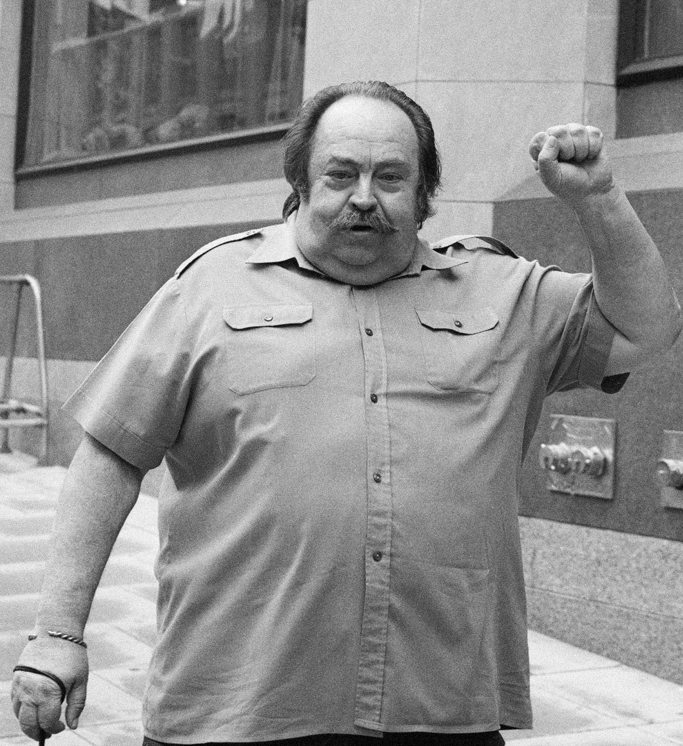
- Bovin in 1991
- Born: Aleksandr Yevgenyevich Bovin; 9 August 1930; Leningrad, Russian SFSR, Soviet Union
- Died: 29 April 2004 (aged 73); Moscow, Russia
- Education: Rostov State University; Moscow State University
- Occupations: Journalist, diplomat and political commentator
- Years active: 1950s–2000s
- Known for: Israel-Russia relations

Aleksandr Yevgenyevich Bovin (Russian: Александр Евгеньевич Бовин, 9 August 1930 – 29 April 2004) was a Soviet and Russian journalist, political scientist and diplomat, notable for being the first Soviet, and then Russian ambassador to Israel after the re-establishment of Soviet-Israeli diplomatic relations. He was a leading journalist of Soviet Union and Russia of the late 20th century. The New York Times called him "one of the most colorful and daring commentators of the late Soviet period" and The Washington Post also said he was "widely regarded as the Soviet Union's most sophisticated and best-informed political commentator".

== Biography ==
=== Early life and education ===
Bovin was born in Leningrad. After spending his childhood in different parts of the USSR as his father was an army officer, he completed school and enrolled at the Rostov State University in Rostov-on-Don, graduating in 1953 with a degree in law. After his graduation, Bovin was appointed to the regional court of the city of Khadyzhensk, serving as a judge from 1953 to 1954 (according to his memories published in 2000, he had been the youngest judge in the USSR at the time of his appointment). He was again appointed to the same position in 1955, serving for another year.

In 1956, Bovin entered the graduate school (aspirantura) at Moscow State University, obtaining a Candidate of Sciences (Ph.D) degree in philosophy in 1959.

=== Political and journalistic career ===
After earning his graduate degree in 1959, Bovin, who had joined the CPSU in 1952, started working as the "scientific consultant" for the philosophical section of the Communist, a CPSU magazine. He worked there until 1963, when he was appointed to the Central Committee of the Communist Party of the Soviet Union as a political consultant as part of a group, which he later led. Bovin occupied this position until 1972. During his political career, he cooperated closely with Yuri Andropov, secretary of the Central Committee at that moment. He also served as the speechwriter for Leonid Brezhnev, the General Secretary of the Central Committee and leader of the USSR, for some years.

For many years Bovin appeared on Soviet Central Television with his weekly program, Mezhdunarodnaya Panorama ("the International Panorama"), where he presented his (and the Party's) view of the preceding week's world events.

Bovin was the object of heavy criticism from the party establishment for his position on the 1968 Soviet invasion of Czechoslovakia, which he vocally opposed, instead praising the reforms in the CSSR that led to the Prague Spring. Discredited in the eyes of the Central Committee, Bovin was suspended from his office and transferred to the Soviet newspaper Izvestia, where he worked as a political commentator from 1972 to 1991, thus beginning his journalistic career.

=== Political commentary and position on Israel ===
Bovin again exhibited his independent, slightly oppositional political stance while working for Izvestia, mainly through his objective position on Israel, which at that time had no diplomatic relations with the USSR (those had been suspended after the Six-Day War in 1967), being officially regarded a strategic enemy and attacked in numerous "anti-Zionist" propaganda campaigns. Bovin's position was much more balanced, frequently justifying Israeli policy and criticizing the Arab governments officially allied with the USSR. This gave him a specific status in Israel even before being appointed as the Soviet ambassador, where he had a generally positive image, as opposed to most Soviet politicians and political theorists. In 1983, his visit to Beijing with the Soviet ambassador to China made him the first high-ranking Soviet to visit China since the Sino-Soviet split in the 1960s. Throughout the 1980s, along with the US-Russia relations, he was a frequent speaker of President Ronald Reagan, and criticized the Reagan administration, calling them "blind and shortsighted" about the Reagan and Gorbachev meeting in Reykjavík, Iceland and also saying Reagan's foreign policy was "chauvist passions [and] military psychosis" but later amended that by saying "Washington politicians will risk jumping into the abyss..It is one thing to send another hundred, or even another thousand, Marines to death, but it is quite another thing to doom to death themselves". In August 1983, he particularly warned the United States of not having "illusions" that US-Soviet relations had "thawed and improved", saying any signs of alleviated tension were not sincere. However, despite his close relations with the Soviet Union press, in March 1987, he called for more independent and Western media commentary and said that the "days when every article represented the government position" belonged to the past. Bovin was also a critic of the Iranian leaders, saying "one can obviously doubt that the theocratic concept of the state will help Iran become a modern flourishing country" and that Mohammad Reza Pahlavi's downfall allowed Iran to fall into economic chaos and suppressed dissent, making Bovin's comments "the harshest since the [Pahlavi's] downfall [in February 1979]". Although a former associate of Brezhnev's, Bovin also publicly criticized him including in a 1987 Soviet Union-operated The New Times article which made it the harshest personal criticism ever to appear in the Soviet Union targeted at Brezhnev. However, despite continuously criticizing the United States, Bovin also made an ally with Canadian prime minister Pierre Trudeau by agreeing and supporting Trudeau's peace proposals, saying "[Russia was] ready to co-operate with Canada in the revival of a detente".

=== Diplomatic career ===
Partly because of his more balanced position, Bovin was appointed Soviet ambassador to Israel by Mikhail Gorbachev after the thorough social and political reforms in the USSR known as the perestroika, which directly led to the re-establishment of diplomatic relations with Israel in 1991. He took this position in December 1991, after the dissolution of the USSR had already been in progress and the treaty liquidating the state had been signed. This led to the peculiar fact that Bovin served as Soviet ambassador for one week, before being accredited as a representative of the Russian Federation, which was the successor state to the USSR in terms of foreign policy: all Soviet ambassadors became Russian ambassadors who co-represented the other now-independent republics until those opened their own diplomatic missions and appointed officials. Bovin remained Russia's ambassador in Israel until March 1997, when he was replaced due to his age. His popularity in Israel was immense and he was generally viewed in a positive light by the Israeli public, despite being the representative of a nation that was perceived as being deeply opposed to the Jewish state, due to his aforementioned political stance. After his retirement, he returned to Russia and continued his career in journalism, working for Izvestia again and ultimately retiring in 2000. During his time with the Soviet Union, Bovin had received several honors including Order of Lenin, Order of the October Revolution and Order of the Red Banner of Labour.

== Published works ==
- Alexander Bovin, "Notes from a non-professional Ambassador" (Записки ненастоящего посла, Zapiski nenastoyachego posla), Zacharov Publishing House, Moscow, 2001 (Russian only)
