= South Yemen–Soviet Union relations =

- Soviet Union: South Yemen

Relations between South Yemen and the Soviet Union were established on December 2, 1967, two days after South Yemen declared independence from the United Kingdom. While a military aid treaty was signed in August 1968, Yemen under the leadership of Qahtan Al-Shaabi was not yet a close partner to the Soviet Union, which competed with China for influence over the country. After the 1969 coup d'état established a Marxist-Leninist state, South Yemen's relationship with the Soviet Union grew closer compared to other Arab states. The Soviet Union played an important role in shaping South Yemen's society through education, military assistance, and ideological alignment.

South Yemen embraced socialist principles and viewed the USSR as a key partner in promoting scientific socialism and proletarian internationalism. Soviet advisers were present across South Yemen, with a 1977 United States congressional report estimating that more than 1,000 were involved in military and ideological training. Despite some challenges to Soviet influence, particularly in the private sector where ideological enforcement faced scrutiny, the ideological alignment between the two entities remained a significant aspect of their relationship.

The Soviet Union, along with other Eastern Bloc states, assisted in the building of the PDRY's armed forces. Strong support from Moscow resulted in Soviet naval forces gaining access to naval facilities in South Yemen, while up to 1,800 Soviet troops were stationed in the country. The most significant among them, a Soviet naval and air base on the island of Socotra for operations in the Indian Ocean. Beyond military benefits, South Yemen provided diplomatic support for the Soviet Union in international organizations such as the United Nations, as well as within the Non-Aligned Movement. While the Soviet Union did not play a role in the establishment of South Yemen as a Marxist state, their influence in the country's later radicalization led to it being described as a "laboratory" for Soviet foreign influence.

== Military ==
Virtually all of South Yemen's arms came from the USSR. By 1985, these sales amounted to more than $2.2 billion. Approximately 1000 Soviet military advisors were present in all levels of the South's military, including with maneuver units and in essential logistic and technical positions.

The South Yemeni military establishment, moreover, was structured along Soviet lines. This included the presence of political officers within units to exercise party control. The Soviets appeared to be involved in this as well. The Komsomol, for example, helped its South Yemeni counterpart-the Union of Democratic Yemeni Youth (ISHID)-to direct lectures and meetings, and provided "advice" within the Army. In addition, 500 Cubans advised the YSP's People's Militia, the military, and the People's Defense Committees-an urban neighborhood security and administrative organization borrowed from Cuba. The training program for the South Yemeni party militia was borrowed from a Soviet model. The East Germans provided advisers for the internal security system and taught at the Police Academy. According to al-Haris, the South Yemeni police journal, "a substantial number" of police commanders were graduates of East Germany's Higher People's Police Academy in Berlin.

== Economy ==
Moscow's participation in the economy was also extensive. The Soviet bloc, for example, provided over 2/3 of foreign investments for the "1980-85 Plan", with the USSR giving the bulk of that. The Soviets apparently had considerable input in formulating the 1980-85 Plan, which was tied to COMECON plans. Moscow was South Yemen's single largest creditor in what was a relatively large total foreign debt of $761 million (as of 1982), equivalent to 80.2% of South Yemen's GNP. At the meeting of the Joint Soviet-South Yemeni Economic Committee in January 1985, a new economic agreement was signed which reportedly included a new loan of 384 million Rubles.

There used to be more than 1000 Soviet experts working on over 50 joint economic projects in the high-priority area of oil exploration and elsewhere. In agriculture, for example, the Soviets helped to build dams and canals, had reclaimed lands, and helped to set up state farms, where they continued to act as advisers. Other Socialist countries are also represented; Bulgaria, for example, cooperated in running tourist hotels and in agriculture, Cuba in poultry farms, and East Germany in construction. The intent of both Aden and Moscow was to develop closer economic links; Thus, although 56% of South Yemen's foreign trade in 1983 was still with the non-Communist world, this was a decline from 70% in 1980 and conformed to the stated goal of both parties to shift Aden's trade to the Soviet bloc as quickly as feasible.

== See also ==
- Foreign relations of South Yemen
- Foreign relations of the Soviet Union
- Russia–Yemen relations
- List of ambassadors of Russia to Yemen
