= Russia–Saudi Arabia relations =

- Russia: Saudi Arabia

Diplomatic mission
- Embassy of Russia, Riyadh: Embassy of Saudi Arabia, Moscow

Envoy
- Ambassador Sergei Kozlov: Ambassador Raid bin Khalid Krimli

Russia–Saudi Arabia relations (Russian: Российско-саудовские отношения, Arabic: العلاقات السعودية الروسية) are the bilateral relations between the Russian Federation and the Kingdom of Saudi Arabia. The two countries are referred to as the two petroleum superpowers and account for about a quarter of the world's crude oil production between them.

== Saudi Arabia and the Soviet Union ==
Soviet Union–Saudi Arabia relations
- Soviet Union: Saudi Arabia

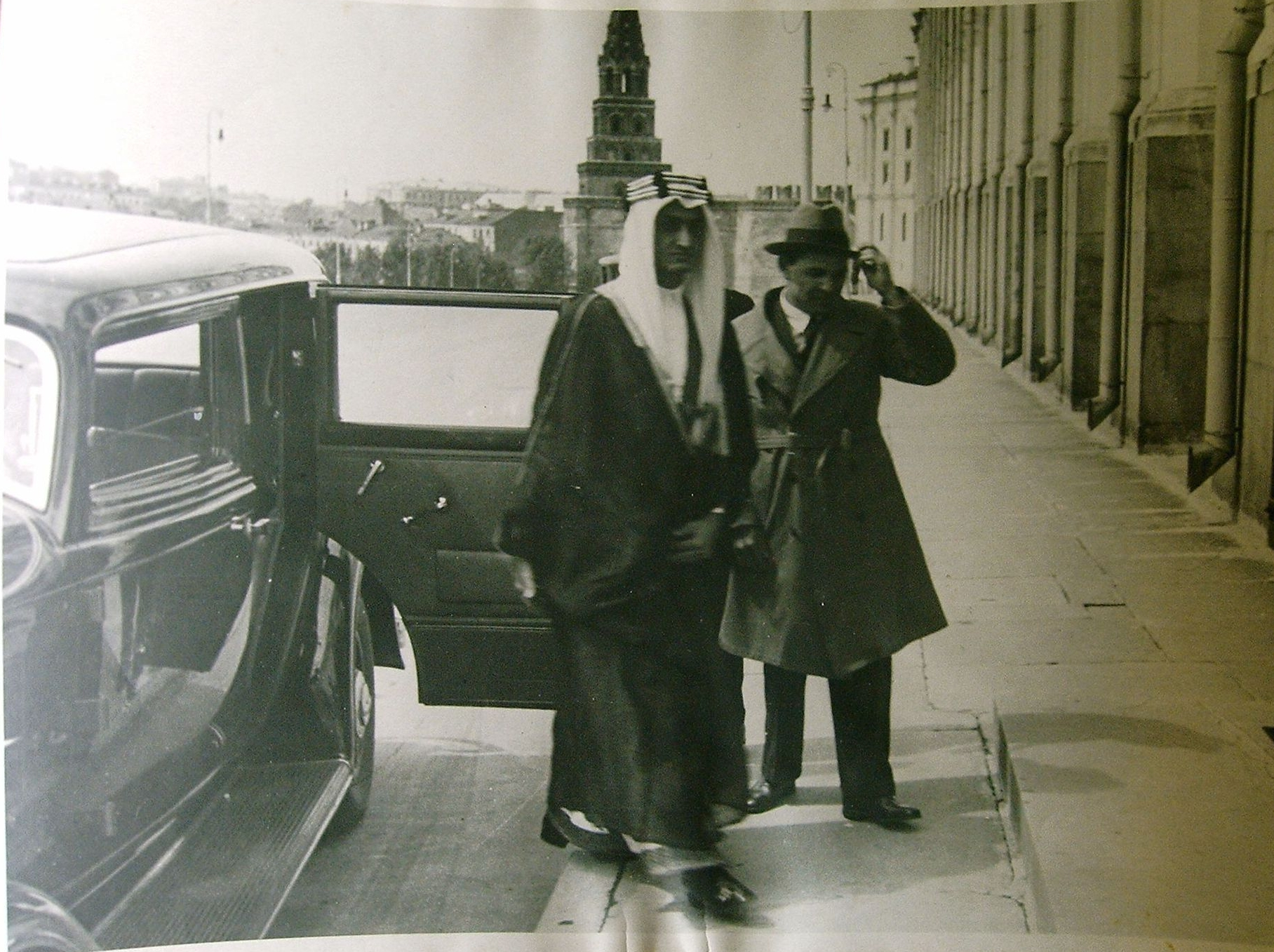
Moscow, 1932: Soviet diplomat Karim Khakimov accompanies the future King of Saudi Arabia, Faisal bin Abdulaziz Al Saud.

The first country to establish full diplomatic relations with the Kingdom of Hejaz and Nejd (the name of the Saudi state until 1932) was the Soviet Union. The relations began in 1926 as a means for Moscow to stand up to the UK. The first Consul General was Karim Khakimov, a Soviet Muslim of Tatar descent sometimes called the Soviet Lawrence of Arabia, who in February 1926 drove through gunfire from Jeddah to Ibn Saud's residence in the desert to hand over a formal note recognising his status as king. Relations improved further when in June 1926 the Pan-Islamic Congress of Mecca was called to resolve the dispute over control of the holy sites of Mecca and Medina. The Soviet Union, with its 30 million Soviet Muslims, supported Ibn Saud by sending six Soviet Islamic scholars to take part in the congress, contrary to its atheistic ideology. Using the Soviet influence to spread Communist propaganda among Hajj pilgrims was unsuccessful so the diplomatic focus turned to the creation of trade links between Soviet Black Sea ports and Hejaz. Ibn Saud's son Prince Faisal (who became king in 1964) visited the Soviet Union in 1932 during his extensive European trip. King Abdulaziz used Moscow's offer of one million British pounds in financial aid as leverage with London and never accepted the USSR's offer.

However, relations cooled later on; in 1932, the Soviet Muslims were unofficially banned from performing Hajj. Khakimov returned to Jeddah as the Head of Mission in 1935, and tried to renew the relationship, but Moscow was no longer interested in new trade contracts. Joseph Stalin, who was never convinced of the value of the USSR's presence in the Gulf, saw the partnership with King Abdulaziz and political ambitions for the Gulf as disposable political gambits that Moscow thought would enhance relations with the British, whose support the Soviet Union sought against Germany. Khakimov was recalled to Moscow for a routine visit in 1937 and arrested on suspicion of being a spy; he and his colleague Turyakulov fell victim to Stalin's political terror. Turyakulov was executed in October 1937 and Khakimov the following January. King Abdulaziz was outraged at the killing of these two Soviet diplomats whom he considered his friends. Two months after Khakimov's execution American geologists discovered the world's largest deposits of crude oil in Dhahran prompting the Soviet Union to appoint a new head of mission in Jeddah in 1938. King Abdulaziz refused to accept anyone other than Khakimov or Turyakulov and months later broke diplomatic ties with the Soviet Union, accusing Moscow of inciting a revolution in the Muslim world. With the USSR out of the way, Britain and latterly the US took over the development and exploitation of Saudi oil.

Relations were especially strained from 1979, during the Soviet–Afghan War, with Saudi Arabia supporting the Afghan Mujahideen in close cooperation with the United States.

In 1990, relations between Saudi Arabia and the Soviet Union were restored after 52 years of breakup. Despite a lack of relations, about 20 Soviet Muslims were allowed to annually make the Hajj from 1946 until 1990 when liberalization allowed thousands of Soviet Muslims to attend.

== Saudi Arabia and Russia ==
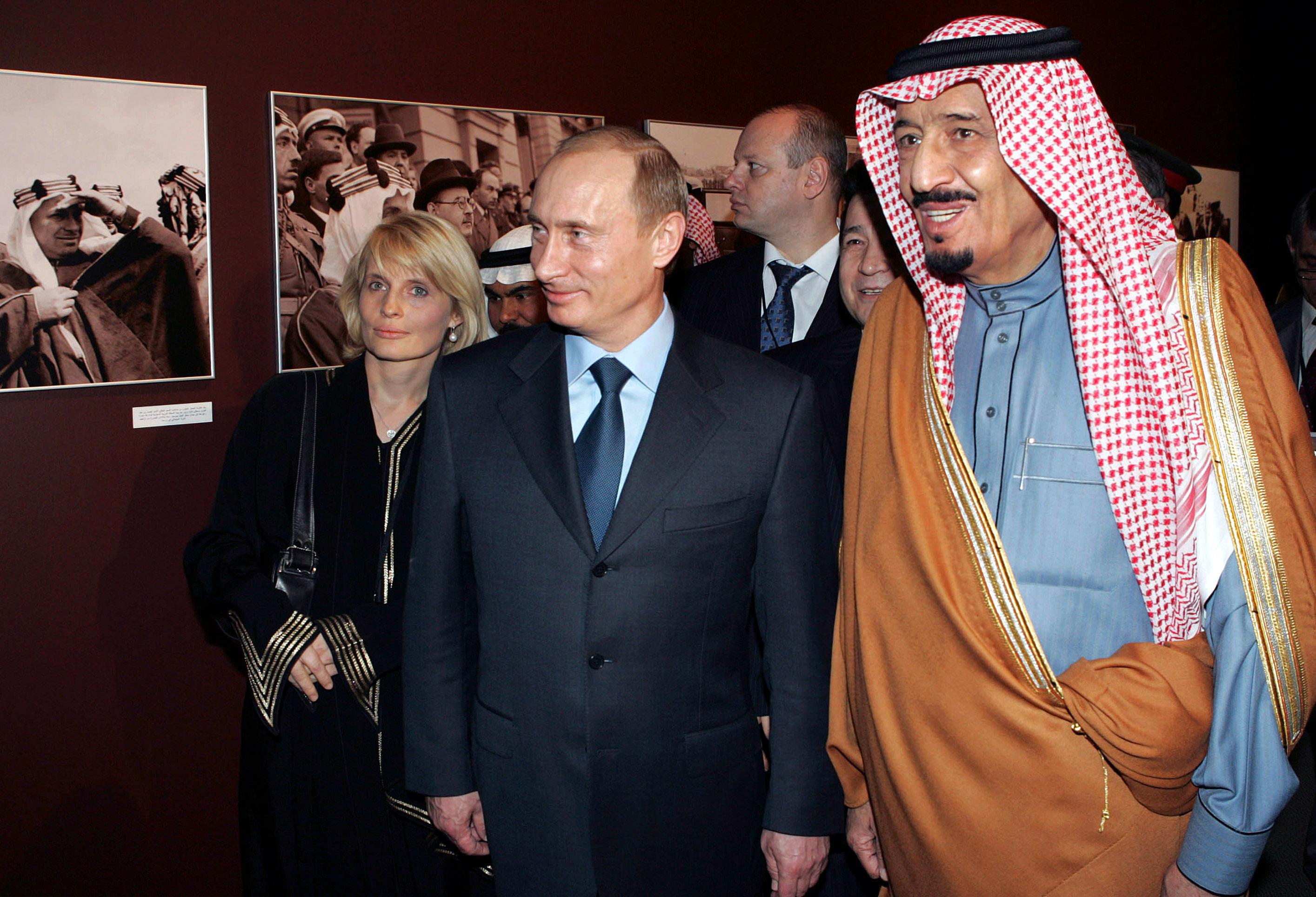
Governor Salman bin Abdulaziz with Vladimir Putin in 2007

In the first 25 years since establishment in 1992, Russian-Saudi relations never developed beyond symbolic visits. Though during Saudi King Salman 2017 visit to Moscow, he did bring a 1,500-strong delegation; however, the Moscow-Riyadh agreement paled in comparison to Saudi arms contracts with the US.

Russian President Vladimir Putin met King Abdullah in Riyadh during a high level delegation visit on 11–12 February 2007. It was the first official visit for a Russian leader to the Kingdom. The visit was an opportunity for Moscow to improve its relations with Riyadh regarding various areas, including regional security issues, energy, trade, transportation, scientific cooperation and exchanges. King Abdullah's visit to Russia in 2003, as Crown Prince, was an opening in high level contacts between the countries which did not have diplomatic ties from 1938 until 1990.

=== Syrian Civil War, military cooperation ===
Relations between the two countries became strained during the Syrian Civil War, in which Russia and its ally Iran put their support behind Syria's government and President Bashar al-Assad while Saudi Arabia along with Qatar and Turkey backed insurgents in Syria. Saudi Arabia, prior to Russia's direct military intervention in Syria in September 2015, was reported to have sought to use its offer to reduce its oil production in exchange for Russia dropping its support for Syrian president Bashar al-Assad, a proposal that Russia rejected.

In February 2016, Saudi Arabia offered for the first time to send ground troops to Syria; a Saudi official confirmed that Riyadh had sent warplanes to Incirlik Air Base in Turkey, a move considered as preparation for an incursion into Syria and seen as inimical to Russia's as well as Iran's interests. Russia reacted to the reports with public sarcasm alluding to the Saudi Arabian-led military intervention in Yemen.

Relations improved significantly in 2017 as Russia's influence in the Middle East rose following military success in Syria as a result of its intervention in the Syrian conflict on the side of the Bashar al-Assad government, on whose removal from power Saudi Arabia had insisted prior. Military issues were among the topics of discussions held by Vladimir Putin and Saudi defence minister deputy crown prince Mohammed bin Salman in Moscow on 30 May 2016.

Russia and Saudi Arabia have taken similar approaches to North Africa, strongly supporting the military rule of Abdel Fattah el-Sisi in Egypt following the 2013 Egyptian coup d'état. Similarly, both Russia and Saudi Arabia have supported Khalifa Haftar and the Libyan National Army in the Second Libyan Civil War. In January 2020, Le Monde reported that Saudi Arabia was helping finance the activities of the Wagner Group, a Russian paramilitary organization, in supporting Haftar in Libya.

=== Coordination on oil markets (2016–2022) ===
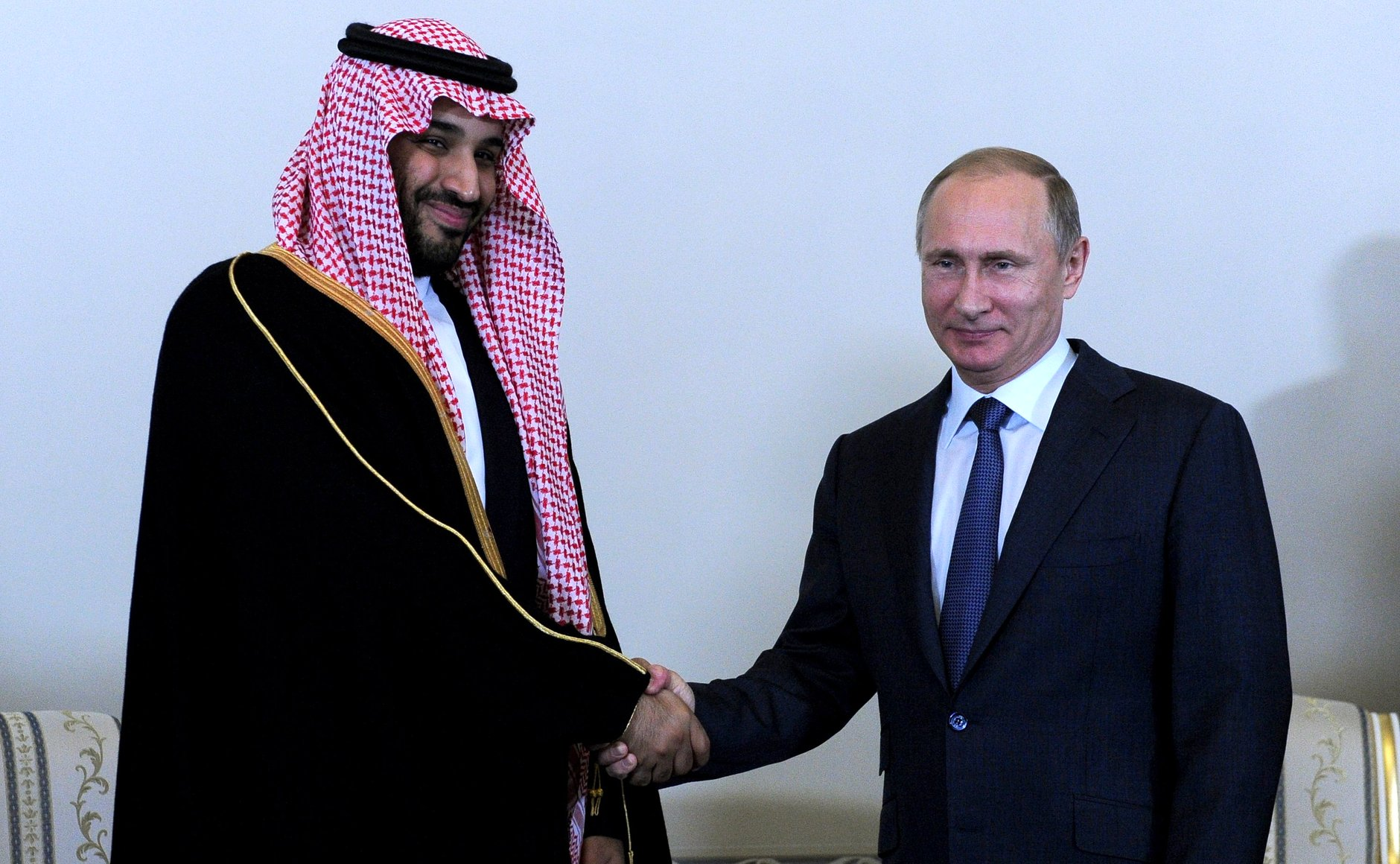
Russian president Vladimir Putin and minister of defense of Saudi Arabia Mohammed bin Salman meet on the sidelines of the 19th St Petersburg Economic Forum, 18 June 2015

In early September 2016, following a meeting between Russian president Vladimir Putin and Saudi deputy crown prince Mohammed bin Salman on the sidelines of the G20 summit, Saudi Arabia, a leading OPEC member, and non-OPEC Russia agreed to cooperate in world oil markets to tackle a global glut, saying they could limit output in the future and signing a joint statement to this effect. Later that year, Russia agreed to join OPEC nations′ commitment to reduce oil output, with cuts taking effect from 1 January 2017 to last for six months; Russian president Vladimir Putin and Saudi deputy crown prince Mohammed bin Salman, along with Iran's supreme leader Ayatollah Ali Khamenei, were said to have played a key role in having OPEC rivals Iran and Saudi Arabia set aside differences to make the organization's first deal with non-OPEC Russia in 15 years possible. In April 2017, deputy crown prince Mohammed bin Salman told The Washington Post that the Saudis had been “coordinating [their] oil policies recently” with Moscow in order to convince Russia that Riyadh was a better bet for them than Tehran, the main goal being ″not to have Russia place all its cards in the region behind Iran″.

In May 2017, the two countries agreed to extend the oil production cuts until March 2018.

On 5 March 2020, OPEC cut its total production of oil, and called upon OPEC+ participants, including Russia, to do the same. Russia rejected the demand to cut oil production the following day, marking the end of the unofficial partnership with OPEC. Russia was also described as having been disappointed in the lack of Saudi investment in Russia during the past few years. Saudi Arabia consequently boosted production to increase its market share, leading to an oil price war between the countries. On March 20, 2020, the Kremlin stated that in terms of oil, Saudi Arabia and Russia enjoy good relations, and that the Russian government does not want any other party to intervene in this relation.

The relations between Russia and Saudi Arabia further evolved under Saudi Crown Prince Mohammed bin Salman, granting the two nations the ability to "conspire" in oil export decisions. Russia is currently a major exporter of refined fuels to the Saudis and other Middle Eastern countries. Subsequent to the 2022 Russian invasion of Ukraine, Saudi Arabia intensified investments in Russian energy companies. Saudi Arabia and Russia lead the OPEC+ group.

=== Other events ===
During 2017, Saudi Arabia encouraged the United States to remove sanctions on Russia pertaining to its activity in Ukraine in exchange for Russian assistance in ending the Iranian military presence in Syria.

Russia has remained neutral between Saudi Arabia and Qatar in the Qatar diplomatic crisis, offering to mediate in July 2017.

In December 2017, Russia withdrew diplomatic representation from the Houthi-held Yemeni capital Sana'a, in opposition to the killing of former Yemeni President Ali Abdullah Saleh by the Houthis. The killing took place as a consequence of his defection from the Houthi-dominated Supreme Political Council to the Saudi coalition in the Yemeni Civil War.

From December 2017 onward, Saudi Arabia abandoned its past support for UN resolutions condemning the Russian military intervention in Ukraine, instead choosing to abstain.

In August 2018, Russia backed Saudi Arabia in its dispute with Canada, with Russian foreign ministry spokeswoman Maria Zakharova stating that "the politicization of human rights matters is unacceptable".

In the aftermath of the assassination of Jamal Khashoggi in October 2018, Putin stated that Russia "cannot start deteriorating relations" with Saudi Arabia as "it did not know what really happened." His press secretary, Dmitry Peskov, later added that there was "no reason basically not to believe" the official statements issued by Saudi Arabia on the matter.

In December 2018, Russian deputy foreign minister Mikhail Bogdanov warned the United States against interference in the line of succession to the Saudi throne by pushing for the ouster of Crown Prince Mohammad bin Salman (MBS), following reports that U.S. officials would support replacing him with Ahmed bin Abdulaziz. Bogdanov stated that "the King made a decision and I can't even imagine on what grounds someone in America will interfere in such an issue and think about who should rule Saudi Arabia, now or in the future."

In October 2021, Russia voted against a Dutch resolution in the UN Human Rights Council that proposed extending the mandate of the Group of Eminent Experts (GEE) human rights investigators in Yemen. This resolution had been heavily lobbied against by Saudi Arabia.

=== Saudi state visit to Russia (October 2017) ===
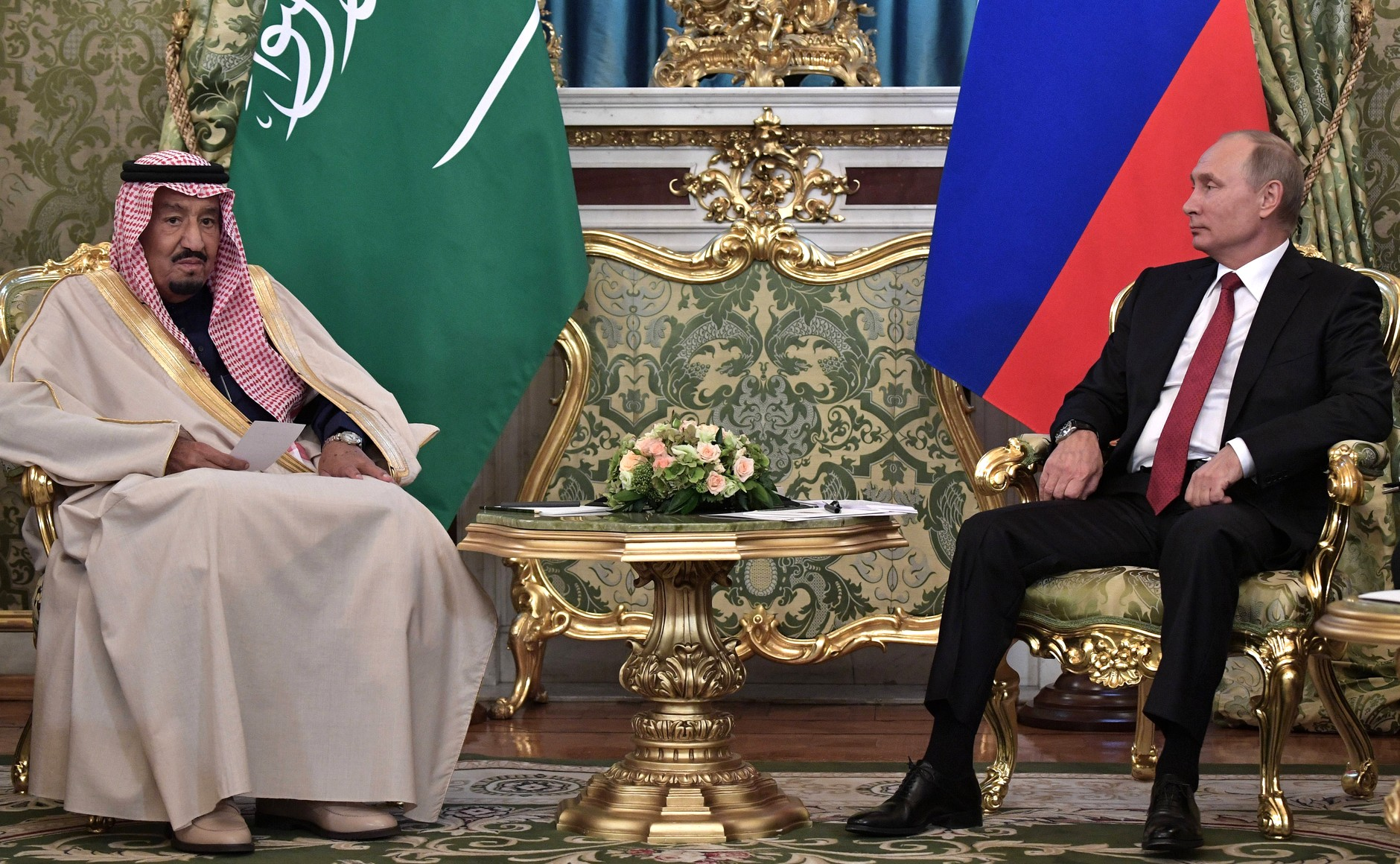
Russian president Vladimir Putin and King of Saudi Arabia Salman bin Abdulaziz Al Saud in the Kremlin, 5 October 2017.

On 4 October 2017, a three-day visit of King of Saudi Arabia Salman bin Abdulaziz Al Saud to Russia began, the first official trip to Russia (or the USSR) by a reigning Saudi monarch. The planned visit had been hailed by media as an unexpected rapprochement between the two foes, and by Saudi Arabia's foreign ministry — as "historic". The sheer fact of the King's visit was interpreted by American media as suggesting that the Saudi government, a close ally of the United States for more than 70 years, was pursuing a more independent role in the U.S.-Russian geopolitical rivalry.

On the first day of negotiations, a package of bilateral documents was signed that ranged from oil, military and space exploration. The weapons deals worth three billion dollars to be finalised at the end of October 2017, in line with Saudi Arabia's bid to localise arms manufacturing, envisaged the possibility of transfer of technology for the local production of Russian Kornet-EM anti-tank missiles, TOS-1A rocket launchers and AGS-30 automatic grenade launchers, the latest version of the Kalashnikov assault rifle, and long-range S-400 missile system. Saudi Arabia agreed to invest one billion dollars in Russian energy projects, and Russian gas processing and petrochemicals company Sibur committed to build a plant in Saudi Arabia in a separate 1.1 bln agreement. Regarding an oil output cut deal extension to the end of 2018 that had been floated as a possibility by Vladimir Putin a day prior to the talks with the King, after the talks the Kremlin stressed that Vladimir Putin had not proposed the extension but allowed it as a possibility, subject to market conditions. Russian media and experts made much of the Saudi foreign minister's remark about prospects of the Russia sanctions being lifted but also cautioned that real cooperation between the counties had yet to materialise.

It was reported that during the King Salman's visit Russia had made a request that Saudi Arabia participate in the rebuilding of Syria when hostilities were over.

=== Coalition against Turkey (2016–2021) ===
Deterioration in relations between Saudi Arabia and Turkey as well as Russia's long skepticism and distrust toward Ankara, especially since Recep Tayyip Erdoğan openly supported Turkish expansionism resulted in growing relationship between Riyadh and Moscow. Russia and Saudi Arabia have together backed Khalifa Haftar's forces, House of Representatives, in Libya against Turkey-backed Government of National Accord; and Saudi Arabia also backed Russian intervention in Syria for the first time.

In September 2020, during the 2020 Nagorno-Karabakh conflict, after the Turkish leader blamed Saudi Arabia for the conflict, Saudi Arabian TV channel Al Arabiya had broadcast the speech of Armenian President Armen Sargsyan accusing Turkey and Azerbaijan of inflaming the conflict, the first time the channel had ever made an interview with an Armenian leader despite Saudi Arabia has no official relations with Armenia, signaling that Saudi Arabia is backing Armenia against Turkey. Armenia is also a Russian ally and Turkey's arch-foe.

Saudi and Turkey relations started to recover after the end of Qatar diplomatic crisis. Following the Russian invasion of Ukraine, Iran and Russia have deepened their ties. Saudi-Turkish relations continued to grow in response to perceived Iranian threats.

In late 2024, Iran and Russia suffered a significant setback in Syria with the fall of the Assad regime. Russia's growing ties with Iran may have prompted Saudi Arabia to seek alternative partnerships and to work closer with the US and Turkey.

=== Relations after the Russian invasion of Ukraine ===
In February 2022, the gas prices soared to their highest level in more than seven years. While the conflict in Ukraine was being considered the major reason behind the spiking gas prices, it was also due to the thriving relations between Saudi and Russia as the leaders of OPEC+. Meanwhile, the relations between MBS and Joe Biden soured, as Biden refused to meet with MBS due to his alleged complicity in the assassination of Jamal Khashoggi. In January 2022, the Saudi king also refused Joe Biden's plea to increase oil production, which indirectly profited Russia.

On 6 March 2022, six Russian defense companies sanctioned by the United States and Britain reportedly exhibited weapons at the World Defense Show held in Riyadh, Saudi Arabia. The arms fair featured Russian companies like Rosoboronexport, which is sanctioned by the United States along with Britain sanctioned UralVagonZavod and state-funded manufacturing firm, Rostec. A source close to the British defense industry cited concerns regarding the presence of Russian firms at the arms fair in Riyadh, considering the siege of Ukraine. The event was organized and run by the state-backed General Authority for Military Industries (GAMI), responsible for the regulation of defense firms within the country. Defense analysts expected a sharp increase in the sale of arms at the fair following the Russian invasion of Ukraine.

On 13 July 2022, the Kremlin expressed hope that a visit by President Biden in Saudi Arabia to boost OPEC oil production would not foster anti-Russian sentiments there. Russia is the largest oil and gas exporter after Saudi Arabia and enjoys a highly valued cooperation with the Arab country in the framework of the OPEC+ group. Russia blames international sanctions for higher energy prices around the world.

In early April 2023, the lead frigate of Russia's Northern fleet Admiral Gorshkov made headlines when docking at the Saudi port of Jeddah, after participating in naval drills in the Indian Ocean and Arabian Sea, the first docking there of a Russian military vessel in almost a decade. The event was deemed significant and raised suspicion in the West because the ship is armed with hypersonic missiles.

On 23 August 2023, at the 15th BRICS summit, Russia along with the other members of BRICS formally invited Saudi Arabia to join the organization. Saudi Arabia became a full member starting 1 January 2024.

In 2025, leaked documents from 2023 showed that Saudi Arabia paid Russian state-owned firms more than 2-billion euros for an air defense system.

== Resident diplomatic missions ==
- Russia has an embassy in Riyadh and a consulate-general in Jeddah.
- Saudi Arabia has an embassy in Moscow.
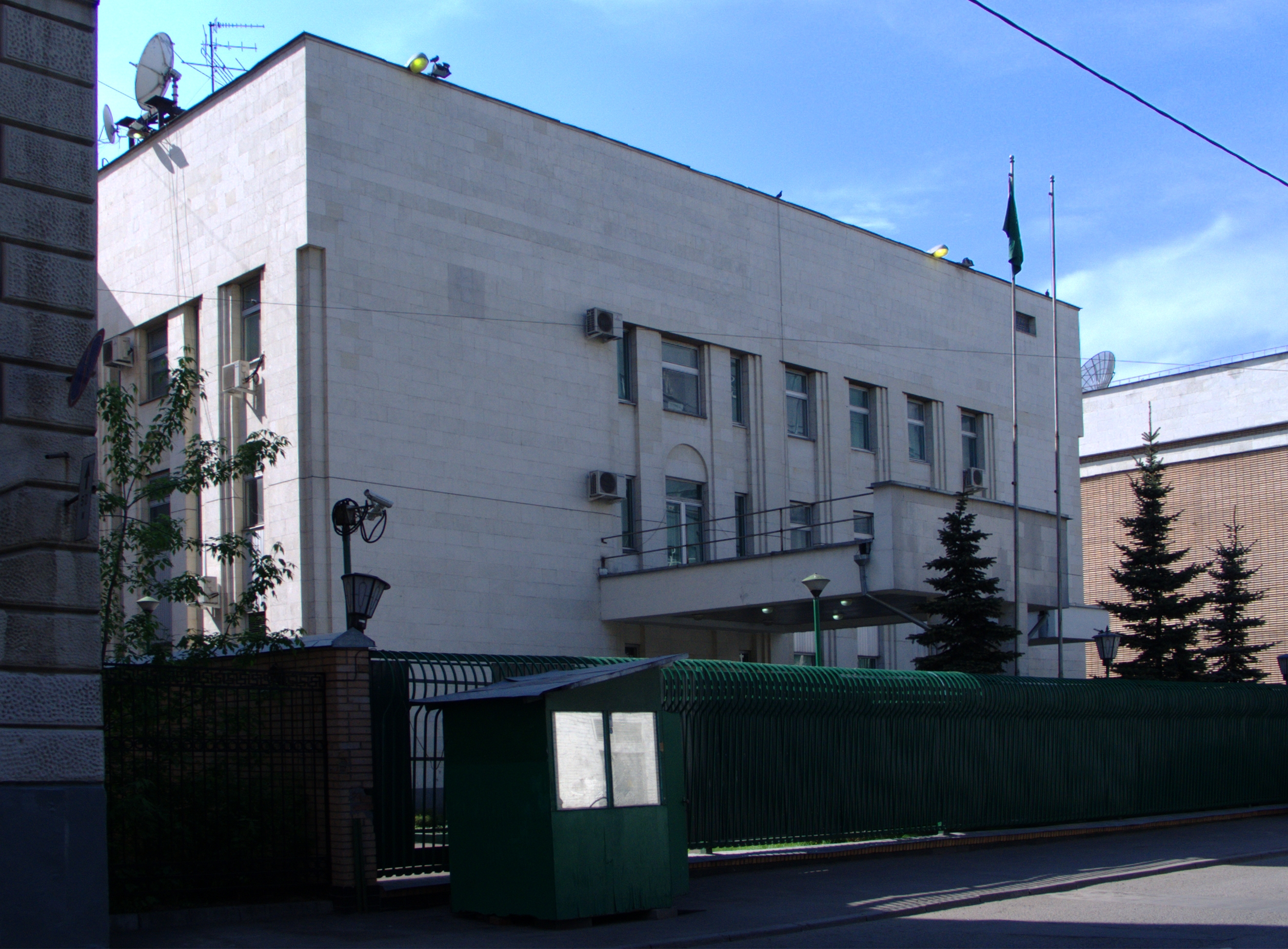
Embassy of Saudi Arabia in Moscow

== See also ==
- Foreign relations of Russia
- Foreign relations of Saudi Arabia
- List of ambassadors of Saudi Arabia to Russia
- List of Ambassadors of Russia to Saudi Arabia
