= Knowledge City =

Knowledge City may refer to:

- Markaz Knowledge City, a city in Kerala, India
- Knowledge Economic City, Medina, a city in Saudi Arabia
- Sino-Singapore Guangzhou Knowledge City station, a metro station in Huangpu, Guangzhou, China
