= List of ambassadors of Turkey to OIC =

The list of ambassadors of Turkey to OIC includes diplomats who represent Turkey's interests within the Organisation of Islamic Cooperation (OIC). The Turkish Permanent Mission to the OIC was established in Jeddah on 24 July 2015 and began operations at a temporary office in the Radisson Blu Hotel. On 25 December 2015, the Permanent Mission relocated to its permanent chancery in Jeddah's Al Zahra district.

Ambassador and Permanent Representative Salih Mutlu Şen presented his letter of credence to the OIC Secretary General Iyad Ameen Madani, on 2 August 2015.

== List of ambassadors ==
#	Ambassador	Term start	Term end	Ref.
1	Salih Mutlu Şen	2 August 2015	23 February 2020	
2	Mehmet Metin Eker	23 February 2020	14 March 2024	
3	Cenk Uraz	17 March 2024	Present	

== See also ==
- Organization of Islamic Cooperation
- Ministry of Foreign Affairs
- List of diplomatic missions of Turkey
