= Georgy Astakhov =

Soviet diplomat (1897–1942)

- Георгий Александрович Астахов

Chargé d'affaires ad interim of the Soviet Union to Germany
- In office May 1939 – August 1939

Chargé d'affaires ad interim of the Soviet Union to Germany
- In office November 1937 – 1938
- Preceded by: Konstantin Yurenev (as plenipotentiary)
- Succeeded by: Alexei Merekalov (as plenipotentiary)

Head of the Press Department of the People's Commissariat for Foreign Affairs
- In office 1936–1937
- Preceded by: Konstantin Umansky
- Succeeded by: Yevgeny Gnedin

Diplomatic representative of the Soviet Union to Yemen
- In office May 1928 – November 1928
- Preceded by: Office established
- Succeeded by: Karim Khakimov

Personal details
- Born: January 1897 Kiev, Russian Empire
- Died: 14 February 1942 (aged 45) Ustvymlag, Komi ASSR, Soviet Union
- Party: Bolshevik
- Spouse: Natalya Pilatskaya
- Education: Moscow University
- Occupation: Diplomat, journalist, orientalist

Georgy Aleksandrovich Astakhov (Russian: Гео́ргий Алекса́ндрович Аста́хов; January 1897 – 14 February 1942) was a Soviet diplomat, journalist, and orientalist. He held posts in Turkey, Japan, Britain, Transcaucasia, and Germany, and was head of the Press Department of the People's Commissariat for Foreign Affairs (NKID) in 1936–1937. In 1928 he negotiated the Soviet–Yemeni treaty of friendship and trade, the first treaty the Soviet Union concluded with an Arab state on equal terms. From May 1939 he was chargé d'affaires ad interim in Berlin and took part in the contacts with German officials that preceded the Molotov–Ribbentrop Pact; for much of this period he acted without instructions from Moscow. He was recalled on the eve of the pact, dismissed from the NKID in December 1939, and arrested in February 1940 during the Stalinist repressions. In 1941 he was sentenced to fifteen years in the labour camps. He died in Ustvymlag on 14 February 1942 and was rehabilitated in 1957.

== Early life and education ==
Astakhov was born in Kiev in January 1897. His father, Alexander Astakhov, from a family of Don Cossacks that owned about 500 desiatinas of land; he had graduated from Kiev University and worked as a zemstvo agronomist. His mother, Nadezhda Alekseyevna, was a housewife. The family moved several times, living in Simferopol, Kupyansk, Tsaritsyn, and Novocherkassk. Astakhov finished the gymnasium in Novocherkassk and in 1915 entered the historical-philological faculty of Moscow University, in the Romance and Germanic section.

== Early career ==
In 1918 Astakhov spent two months in Berlin as a correspondent of the Russian Telegraph Agency; he left when the Soviet mission was expelled from Germany in November 1918. During the civil war he was with Red Army units in the Caucasus, where on the orders of Sergei Kirov he edited the newspaper Kommunist in Vladikavkaz. In November 1920 Kirov, then RSFSR plenipotentiary to the Democratic Republic of Georgia, made him head of the RSFSR information bureau in Tiflis. This was the start of his diplomatic career.

In March 1922 he was appointed head of the press bureau of the Soviet mission in Turkey. He knew Turkish from earlier work in Trebizond and built up a wide circle of contacts among Turkish journalists and officials; he got on well with both plenipotentiaries he served under, Semyon Aralov and Yakov Suritz. In the autumn of 1923 he fell seriously ill with malaria and had to leave Turkey. He was treated at the tropical institute in Hamburg, and in March 1924 was assigned to the bureau of diplomatic information of the Berlin mission, then headed by Nikolay Krestinsky. While in Berlin he also attended lectures in Chinese at the oriental faculty of Berlin University.

After the establishment of Soviet–Japanese diplomatic relations in January 1925, the first Soviet plenipotentiary to Japan, Viktor Kopp, took Astakhov to Tokyo as head of the mission's press bureau. He stayed nearly three years and made two trips to China, visiting Mukden, Dairen, Peking, and Shanghai. From 1927 he asked repeatedly to be transferred to the central apparatus of the NKID, where he had never worked; the mission leadership supported the request, and at the beginning of 1928 he returned to Moscow and became a referent in the Far Eastern department.

== Mission to Yemen ==
Soon after his return Astakhov was sent to Yemen, with which the Soviet state had no relations of any kind. An NKID letter of the time described him as having higher education, a journalist by profession, with a command of German, French, English, and Turkish. Britain considered south-western Arabia its sphere of influence, so the trip was given no publicity: Astakhov travelled with an ordinary civilian passport on the steamer Teodor Nette. He examined the country's internal and international position, was received by Imam Yahya, and negotiated a treaty of friendship and trade. Moscow approved the terms, and he signed the treaty in Sanaa on 1 November 1928, during a second trip. It was the first equal treaty between the Soviet Union and an Arab state; offices of the Vostgostorg trade agency were later opened in Sanaa and Hodeida.

== Turkey, London, and Transcaucasia ==
On his return from Yemen Astakhov did not receive a new posting at once. In 1929 he worked for a time as deputy editor of the foreign department of Izvestia. In the same period he married Natalya Vladimirovna Pilatskaya, who worked for Pravda. In mid-1929 Suritz, by then plenipotentiary in Turkey, asked the NKID to send him Astakhov as counsellor of the mission in place of Vladimir Potemkin. The party apparatus at first questioned the appointment; Boris Stomonyakov of the NKID collegium defended it in November 1929, and Astakhov left for Turkey with his wife at the beginning of 1930.

In 1933 the NKID collegium first designated him for the consulate in Shanghai, then for the consulate-general in Urumchi, and finally, on 20 October, appointed him second counsellor for the press bureau of the mission in London. He arrived there in February 1934. In London he had little to do; the staff of the mission were specialists on the West and treated him as an outsider. When the NKID looked for a candidate for the post of its representative to the government of the Transcaucasian Socialist Federative Soviet Republic, Astakhov agreed to take it, and he was appointed by decree of the Sovnarkom of 11 July 1935. He remained in Tiflis less than a year. In 1936 Konstantin Umansky, head of the NKID Press Department, was transferred to Washington, and the commissariat regarded Astakhov as the only suitable replacement; a Sovnarkom decree of 4 May 1936, signed by Vyacheslav Molotov, released him from the Transcaucasian post.

Astakhov headed the Press Department as the mass repressions began. Denunciations against him were filed from 1937 on. For remarks he made at a party meeting about the trial of Lev Kamenev and Grigory Zinoviev he received a party reprimand for a "politically harmful" speech. According to testimony in his later criminal case, the NKID party organisation would have expelled him if he had stayed in Moscow; Maxim Litvinov instead had him sent to Berlin as counsellor of the embassy in 1937.

== Berlin, 1937–1939 ==
This was Astakhov's third stay in Germany, after 1918 and 1924–1925. On 3 June 1937 Suritz, now plenipotentiary in Berlin, presented him to the German foreign minister Konstantin von Neurath. A week later Suritz was transferred to Paris. The new plenipotentiary, Konstantin Yurenev, arrived a month after that; at the ceremony at which Yurenev presented his credentials Astakhov was introduced to Adolf Hitler. Yurenev was recalled to Moscow after about four months and perished in the repressions. Astakhov stayed on as chargé d'affaires ad interim.

In a letter to the NKID of 16 February 1938 he assessed the changes at the top of the German army and foreign ministry, and the growing influence of Ribbentrop and Himmler, as unfavourable for the USSR, and wrote that Hitler would not delay the annexation of Austria; after the Anschluss he reported more than once that Czechoslovakia would be the next target. He assisted in preparing the Soviet–German agreement on trade and payments of 1 March 1938, which extended the economic treaty of December 1936. In the summer of 1938 a new plenipotentiary arrived, Alexei Merekalov, who had no diplomatic experience. On 6 July 1938 Astakhov accompanied him on visits to Ribbentrop and to the state secretary Ernst von Weizsäcker. In December 1938 Astakhov asked Litvinov to recall him to work in the Soviet Union; Litvinov took the request badly.

=== The negotiations of 1939 ===
On 3 May 1939 Litvinov was dismissed and Molotov, retaining the chairmanship of the Sovnarkom, became foreign commissar. Merekalov left for Moscow shortly afterwards and did not come back, so Astakhov again headed the embassy as chargé d'affaires. Over the following months the German side repeatedly sounded him out about an improvement of relations. On 6 May he wrote to Molotov about German intentions towards Poland. On 15 May Julius Schnurre, of the economic-policy department of the German foreign ministry, told him that Germany had no aggressive aims against the USSR; Astakhov reported the conversation by telegram on 17 May, and on 20 May Molotov told the German ambassador Schulenburg that economic negotiations needed a political base. Astakhov was not informed of that conversation. On 30 May he was received by Weizsäcker; both sides took the view that ideological differences did not rule out normal relations between the two states.

Astakhov received almost no instructions from Moscow in these months, and in the assessment of the historian S. A. Gorlov he advanced the rapprochement to a considerable degree at his own risk. On 14 June he told the Bulgarian envoy Parvan Draganov that if Berlin gave assurances that it would not attack the USSR, the Soviet Union would not conclude a treaty with Britain, would remain neutral, and would be prepared to reach an understanding with Germany. Draganov passed this on to the German foreign ministry the next day.

Molotov's first replies of substance came at the end of July, after Astakhov reported conversations with Schnurre of 24 and 26 July. Molotov approved his conduct and telegraphed on 29 July that the Soviet government would welcome an improvement in political relations. On 2 August Ribbentrop received Astakhov for a conversation of about an hour and told him that there were no contradictions between the two countries anywhere from the Baltic to the Black Sea. In a letter to Molotov of 8 August Astakhov wrote that the Germans were prepared to declare their political disinterest in the Baltic states except Lithuania, in Bessarabia, and in the former Russian part of Poland, and to renounce their designs on Ukraine. These points soon formed the basis of the secret protocol to the non-aggression treaty. On 11 August Molotov replied that the list interested the Soviet government and that negotiations would be held in Moscow.

On 19 August Molotov ordered Astakhov to Moscow for one day of consultations. He arrived on 23 August, the day the pact was signed, but was not asked to report. He was placed on leave he had not requested and then transferred to the reserve. In a letter to Molotov of 29 October 1939 he wrote that he had been left without work at an exceptionally busy time, as if he had made mistakes or followed a wrong line.

== Arrest and death ==
On 1 December 1939 Astakhov was dismissed from the NKID, formally because of staff cuts. On 7 December he became head of the Caucasus sector of the Museum of the Peoples of the USSR in Moscow. He was arrested on 27 February 1940; the arrest order had been approved by the deputy commissar of internal affairs Vsevolod Merkulov. During the search of his flat, which lasted from one o'clock at night until midday, the NKVD confiscated his correspondence, photographs, and several hundred pages of unpublished manuscripts, including the play The Key of Berlin. The manuscripts were lost. The charges were participation in an anti-Soviet conspiracy in the NKID and espionage for Polish intelligence, although he had just returned from Germany.

He was interrogated twenty-four times over more than a year and was transferred to the Sukhanovka prison, which had a particularly harsh regime. The investigators confronted him with testimony from colleagues who had already been convicted, some of them shot. Astakhov did not admit guilt at any point, named no new names, and said his disagreements with arrested colleagues had been over questions of policy. The investigation was formally completed on 7 May 1941 without a confession. On 9 July 1941, after the German invasion of the Soviet Union, the Military Collegium of the Supreme Court sentenced him to fifteen years in corrective labour camps, with five years' loss of rights and confiscation of property. He was sent to Ust-Vymlag in the Komi ASSR. In a letter to his wife from the camp he wrote that he was not broken and had nothing to repent of. He died there on 14 February 1942. In his memoirs, Pavel Sudoplatov states that from November 1938 Astakhov also carried out the duties of an NKVD intelligence resident in Berlin, reporting directly to Lavrentiy Beria, and that he was at first held without a conviction because his personal acquaintance with the German leadership might still be of use.

Astakhov's widow, Natalya Pilatskaya, herself spent four years in confinement and was released under amnesty after Stalin's death. On her petition the case was reviewed, and on 30 May 1957 the Military Collegium set the sentence aside and closed the case for absence of corpus delicti.

== Literary and journalistic work ==
Astakhov wrote for newspapers and journals from the civil war years on, usually under pseudonyms. Most of his foreign postings produced a book. The manuscripts confiscated at his arrest were never recovered. In 1920 seven of his poems appeared in the collective anthology Alaya neft' (Scarlet Oil) in Baku.

=== Books ===
- Ot sultanata k demokraticheskoy Turtsii: Ocherki iz istorii kemalizma [From Sultanate to Democratic Turkey: Essays in the History of Kemalism]. Moscow; Leningrad, 1926.
- Yaponiya [Japan]. Moscow; Leningrad, 1928. (Under the pseudonym G. Gastov.)
- Yaponskiy imperializm: Politiko-ekonomicheskiy ocherk [Japanese Imperialism: A Political-Economic Sketch]. [Moscow], 1930. (Under the pseudonym G. Gastov.)
- Po Yemenu [Across Yemen]. [Moscow], 1931. (Under the pseudonym G. Ankarin.)
- Po novoy Turtsii [Across the New Turkey]. Moscow, 1933. (Under the pseudonym Yu. Tishansky.)

== Diary ==
The NKID archive preserves what is described as Astakhov's "diary", with entries on his service in Germany in 1939. It is one of the sources on the Soviet–German negotiations of that summer.

== In popular culture ==
Astakhov was portrayed by Vyacheslav Tikhonov in the 2001 film Berlin Express.

== Sources ==
- Sokolov, V. V. (1997). "Трагическая судьба дипломата Г. А. Астахова" [The Tragic Fate of the Diplomat G. A. Astakhov] (PDF). Novaya i noveyshaya istoriya (in Russian) (1): 167–183 – via Publ.lib.ru.
