= Qatar–Russia relations =

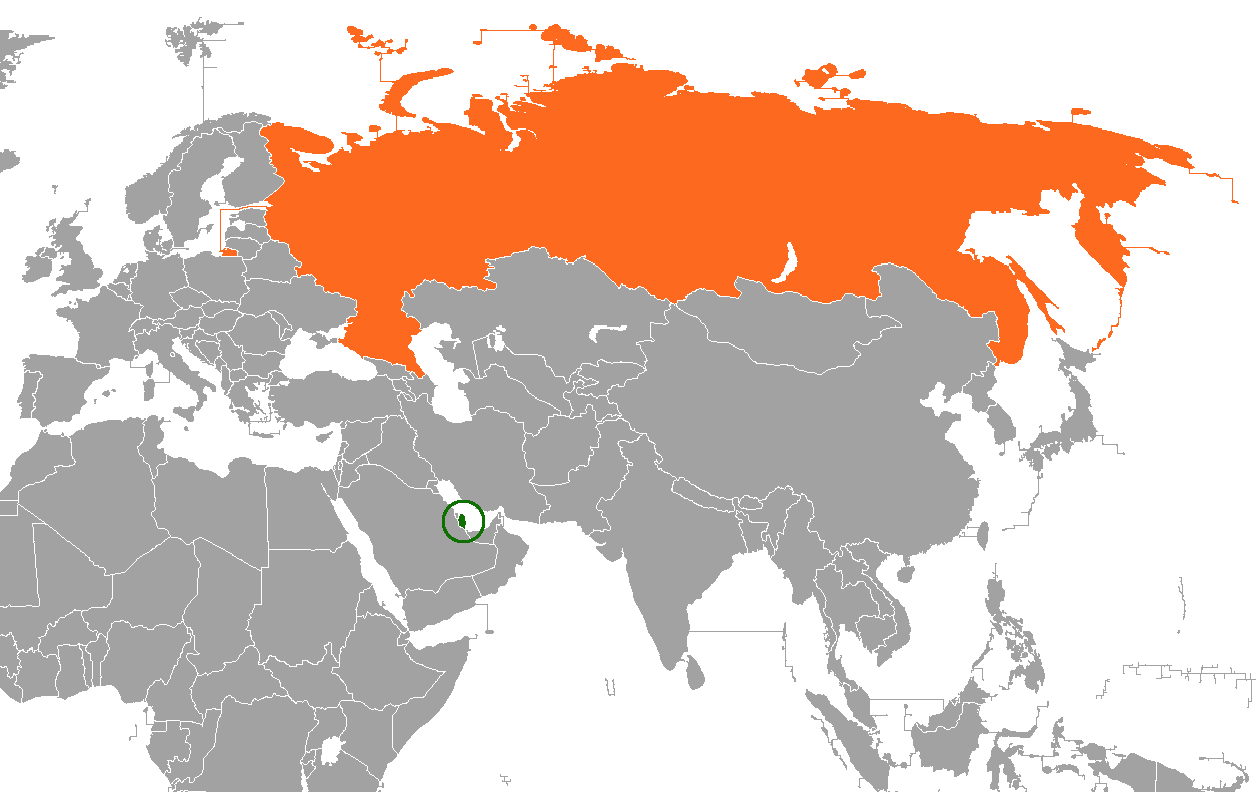

- Qatar: Russia

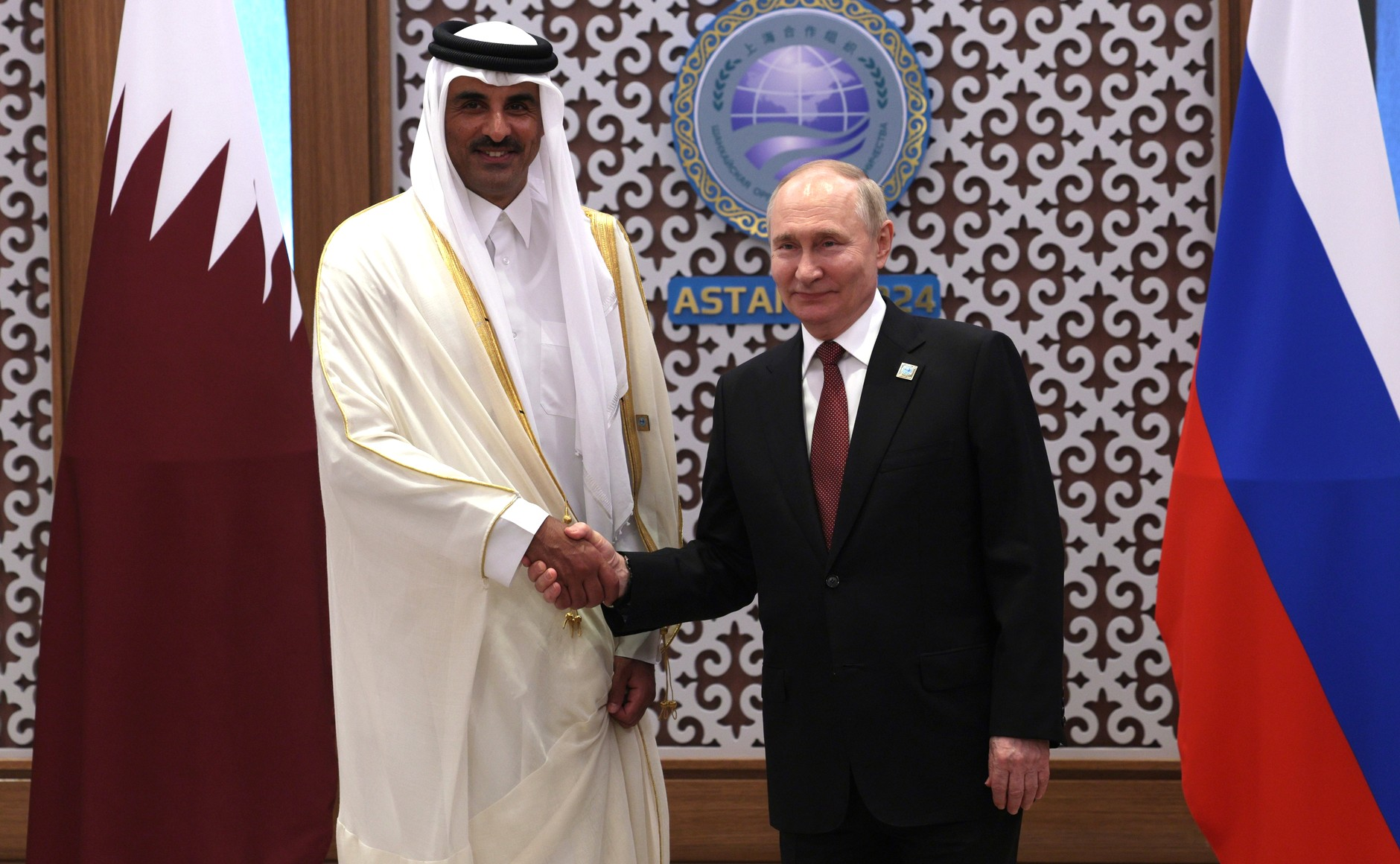
Qatari emir Tamim bin Hamad Al Thani and Russian president Vladimir Putin on 4 July 2024

Qatar–Russia relations (Russian: Российско-катарские отношения) are the bilateral foreign relations between the two countries, Qatar and Russia.

== Background ==
=== Soviet-era relations ===
Following Saudi Arabia's lead, Qatar refused for many years to have diplomatic relations with the Soviet Union. This changed in the summer of 1988, when diplomatic relations between the two states were established on 2 August. The Soviet Union opened its embassy in Doha on 12 November 1989, and Qatar opened its embassy in Moscow on 14 November 1989.

== Russian Federation relations ==
=== Diplomatic ties ===
On 26 December 1991, Qatar recognised the Russian Federation as the successor state to the Soviet Union, after the latter's dissolution. Russia has an embassy in Doha, and Qatar has an embassy in Moscow.

The current ambassador of Russia to Qatar is Nurmakhmad Makhmadullaevich Kholov. The current ambassador of Qatar to Russia is Fahad bin Mohammed Al-Attiyah, who appointed his Letters of Credence to Russian president Vladimir Putin on 16 March 2007.

=== Political ties ===
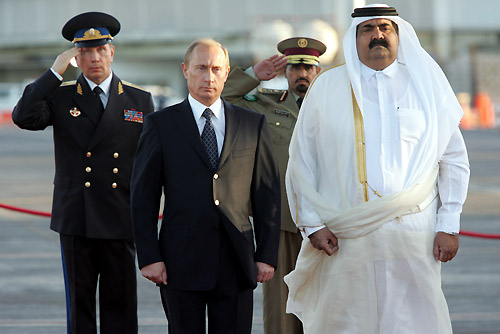
Russian president Vladimir Putin is received by Qatari Emir Hamad bin Khalifa Al-Thani whilst on a state visit to Qatar on 13 February 2007.

Relations became strained after Zelimkhan Yandarbiyev was assassinated in Qatar on 13 February 2004. On the third anniversary of Yandarbiyev's death, Russian president Vladimir Putin traveled to Qatar on a state visit, where he was received by Emir of Qatar Hamad bin Khalifa Al-Thani.

On November 29, 2011, Russian ambassador to Qatar, Vladimir Titorenko, was allegedly assaulted by Qatar airport security and customs officers when he refused to have his suitcase scanned at the airport. Relations again became strained on February 7, 2012, when reportedly, after a diplomat from Qatar warned Russia of losing the support of Arab League about upcoming resolution on the Syrian uprising, which Russia and China later vetoed, the answer came harsh from Russian UN ambassador Vitaly Churkin who replied that If you talk to me like that, there will be no Qatar today and boasted about Russian military superiority over Qatar. Later, Russia denied all these accusations.

On 13 October 2022, Qatari emir Tamim bin Hamad Al Thani met with Russian president Vladimir Putin in the capital of Kazakhstan, Astana. At the time, Putin was a political pariah over the Russian invasion of Ukraine. Tamim praised Putin, saying he was "proud" of the relationship between Qatar and Russia. On 17 August 2024, The Washington Post reported, citing anonymous diplomatic sources, that Ukraine's incursion into the Kursk Oblast of Russia disrupted plans for indirect talks in Doha, Qatar to halt mutual strikes on energy infrastructure in Ukraine and Russia. Both Ukraine and Russia had reportedly planned to send their delegations to indirect talks mediated by Qatari officials, but Russian officials postponed the meeting in the wake of Ukraine's incursion. Some officials had hoped it could be the first step toward a more comprehensive peace deal.

=== Economic ties ===
In 2010, the Russian state-owned Yamal Reindeer Company began producing canned, halal reindeer meat for export to Qatar. Production commenced at the direction of the governor of the energy-rich Yamalo-Nenets Autonomous District, who proposed it during a meeting with Qatari officials.

During a visit to Doha on 12 February 2007, Russian president Vladimir Putin signed an agreement to establish the Russian-Qatari Business Council. As of 4 December 2018, the chairman of the council is Ahmet Palankoev, a Russian businessman.

=== Humanitarian ties ===
During the Russo-Ukrainian war, Qatar mediated between Russia and Ukraine for the return of children to their parents in Ukraine. In October 2023 and December 2023, ten Ukrainian children were reunited with their families. In addition, 11 children arrived in Ukraine in February 2024. In March 2024, another group of Ukrainian children was flown from Russia to Ukraine.
