= Albert Rachkov =

Soviet-Russian politician (1927–2023)

- Альберт Рачков

Second Secretary of the Communist Party of Turkmenistan
- In office 20 December 1980 – 26 July 1986
- Preceded by: Viktor Pereudin
- Succeeded by: Sergey Nesterenko

Ambassador of the Soviet Union to South Yemen
- In office 15 July 1986 – 9 August 1990
- Preceded by: Vladislav Zhukov
- Succeeded by: position abolished

Personal details
- Born: Albert Ivanovich Rachkov; 22 June 1927 Stavropol, Russian SFSR, Soviet Union
- Died: 5 January 2023 (aged 95) Moscow, Russia
- Party: CPSU
- Education: Azovo-Chernomorsk Engineering Institute
- Occupation: Diplomat

Albert Ivanovich Rachkov (Russian: Альбе́рт Ива́нович Рачко́в; 22 June 1927 – 5 January 2023) was a Soviet and Russian diplomat and politician. He served as the second secretary of the Communist Party of Turkmenistan from 1980 to 1986.

Rachkov died in Moscow on 5 January 2023, at the age of 95.
