= Igor Melikhov =

Russian diplomat

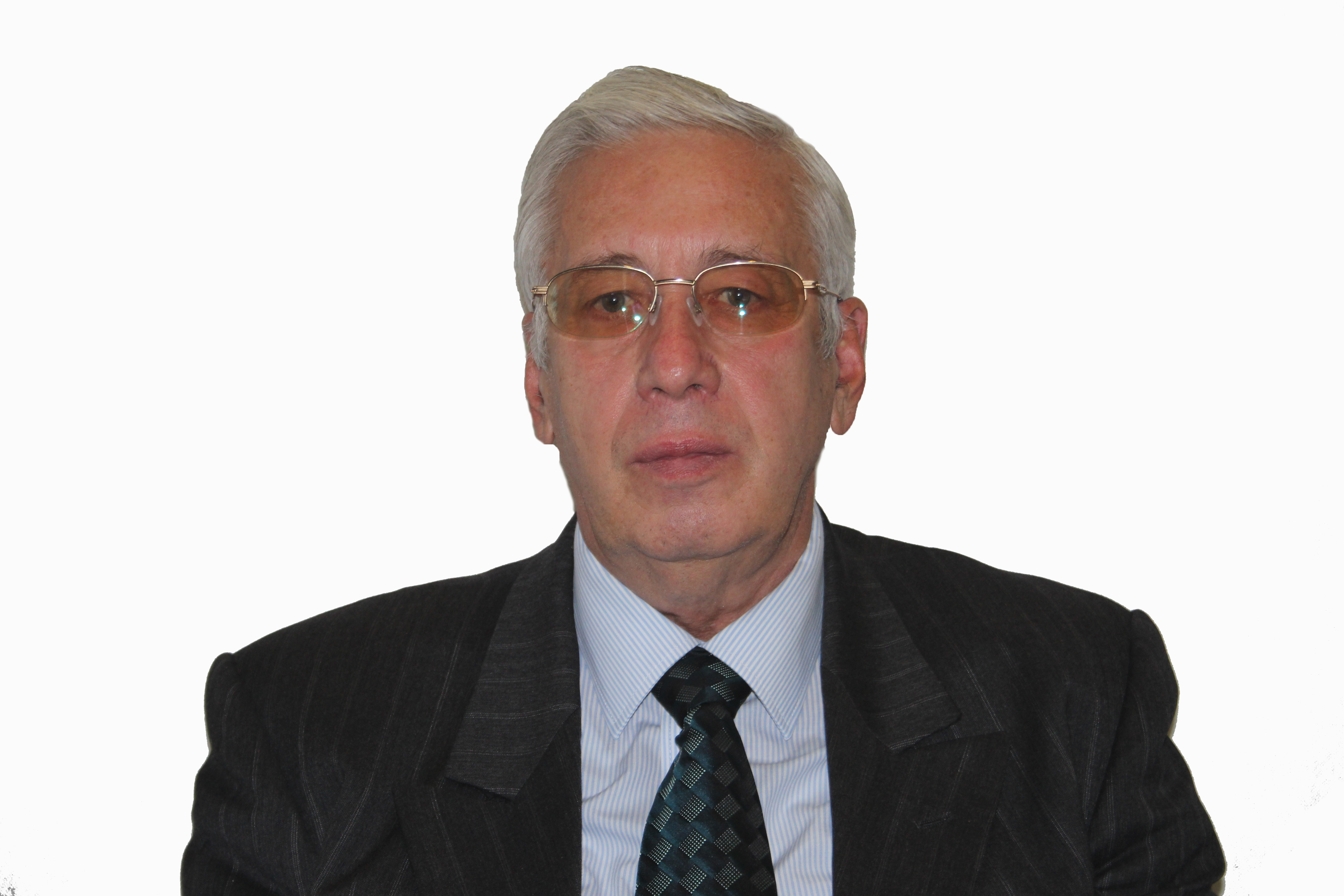
Melikhov in 2016

Igor Alexandrovich Melikhov (Russian: Игорь Александрович Мелихов) (born 1944) is a Russian diplomat.

In 1968 Melikhov graduated from the Moscow State Institute of International Relations and holds a Doctorate in Historical Sciences.

After joining the diplomatic corps of the Soviet Ministry of Foreign Affairs, Melikhov worked in the Diplomatic missions of the USSR in the People's Republic of South Yemen (1968–1971), the People's Democratic Republic of Yemen (1973–1976), Lebanon (1979–1981), Egypt (1981–1984) and Syria (1988–1991).

From 1993—1996 Melikhov was Ambassador of Russia to Qatar, followed by Ambassador of Russia to Saudi Arabia from 1996—2000.

After serving in Saudi Arabia, Melikhov returned to Russia and became deputy director of the Historical and Documentary Department of the Russian Ministry of Foreign Affairs.

From 2004—2008, Melikhov was posted to Abuja as Ambassador of Russia to Nigeria.

Melikhov is fluent in Russian, English, Arabic and French.
