= List of ambassadors of Saudi Arabia to Russia =

Coordinates: 55.7394°N 37.5832°E

Ambassador of Saudi Arabia to Russia
- سفير خادم الحرمين الشريفين لدى روسيا الاتحادية (Ambassador of the Custodian of the Two Holy Mosques to the Russian Federation)
- Coat of Arms of Saudi Arabia

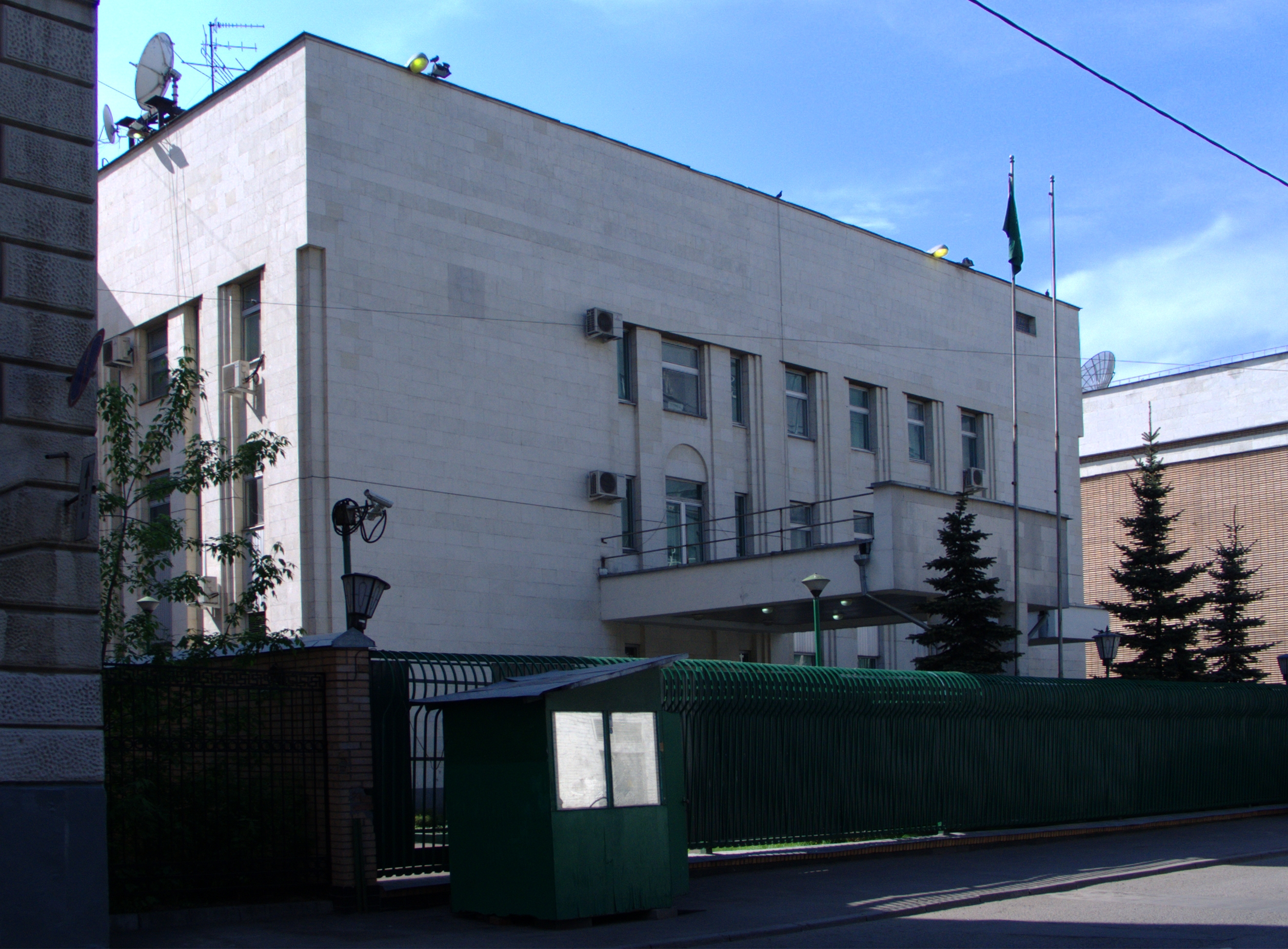
- Incumbent; Raid bin Khalid Krimli since April 11, 2018
- Inaugural holder: Abdulaziz bin Mohieddin Khoja
- Formation: January 1, 1991

The Saudi ambassador in Moscow is the official representative of the Government in Riyadh to the Government of Russia. He is the Custodian of the Embassy of Saudi Arabia in Moscow.

In September 1990 full diplomatic relations were restored between the Saudi government and the Government of the Soviet Union.

== List of representatives ==
Diplomatic accreditation	Ambassador	Arabic	Russian language	Observations	Reference	King of Saudi Arabia	List of heads of government of Russia	Term end
1991	Abdulaziz bin Mohieddin Khoja	عبد العزيز بن محيي الدين خوجة	Абдул Азиз Ходжа			Fahd of Saudi Arabia	Boris Yeltsin	1996
1997	Fawzi Bin Abdul Majeed Shobokshi	فوزي شبكشي	Фаузи Бин Абдул Маджид Шобокши			Fahd of Saudi Arabia	Viktor Chernomyrdin	1999
1999	Mohamed Hassan Abdulwali	ذ محمد حسن عبدالولي	Мухаммед Хасан Абдулвали			Fahd of Saudi Arabia	Vladimir Putin	
2005	Gazi Sherbini	غازي الشربيني	Гази Шербини	Chargé d'affaires		Fahd of Saudi Arabia	Mikhail Fradkov	
April 22, 2008	Ali Hassan Jaafar	علي حسن جعفر	Али Хассан Джаафар	Ali Hassan Jaafar presents his credentials as ambassador of Saudi Arabia, to Vladimir Putin in the Moscow Kremlin.		Abdullah of Saudi Arabia	Vladimir Putin	January 14, 2015
May 28, 2015	Abdulrahman bin Ibrahim Al-Rasi	عبدالرحمن بن ابراهيم الراسي	Бен Ибрахим Бен Али Ал Расси			Salman of Saudi Arabia	Dmitry Medvedev	
April 11, 2018	Raid bin Khalid Krimli	رائد بن خالد قرملي	Раидом Халидом Аль-Кримли			Salman of Saudi Arabia	Dmitry Medvedev	

== See also ==
- Russia–Saudi Arabia relations
