= Assassination of Zelimkhan Yandarbiyev =

2004 murder in Doha, Qatar

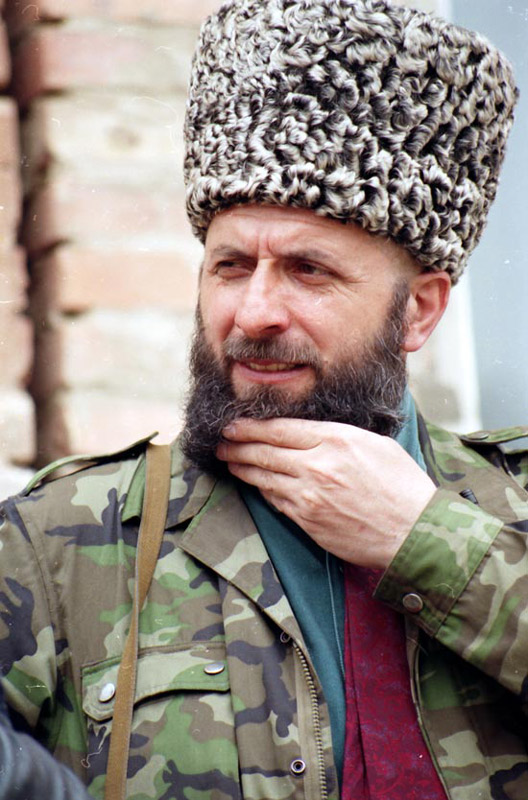
Yandarbiyev in 2000

On February 13, 2004, Zelimkhan Yandarbiyev was assassinated when a bomb ripped through his SUV in the Qatari capital, Doha. Yandarbiyev was fatally wounded and died on the way to the hospital, while his 13-year-old son Daud was seriously injured and arrived in critical condition. According to some reports, two of his bodyguards were killed as well.

It was initially unclear who was responsible for the blast, but suspicion fell on SVR or GRU, which denied any involvement, or internal feuding among the Chechen rebel leadership. Aslan Maskhadov's separatist Foreign Ministry condemned the assassination as a "Russian terrorist attack", comparing it to the 1996 attack that killed Dzhokhar Dudayev. The car bomb led to Qatar's first anti-terrorism law, declaring lethal terrorist acts punishable by death or life imprisonment.

== Investigation and trial ==
On February 19, 2004, the Qatari authorities arrested three Russians in the Russian embassy for the murders. One, the first secretary of the embassy in Qatar, Aleksandr Fetisov, was released in March allegedly due to his diplomatic status, and the remaining two GRU agents - Anatoly Yablochkov (also known as Belashkov) and Vasily Pugachyov (sometimes misspelled as Bogachyov) - were charged with the assassination of Yandarbiyev, the assassination attempt of his son Daud and smuggling weapons into Qatar. According to Russia, Yablochkov and Pugachyov were secret intelligence agents sent to the Russian embassy to collect information about global terrorism. Russia's acting defence minister Sergei Ivanov pledged state support for the suspects and declared that their imprisonment was illegal. There were some speculations that Aleksandr Fetisov had been released in exchange for Qatari wrestlers detained in Moscow on February 28.

The trial proceedings were closed to the public after the defendants claimed that one of the prosecution witnesses, Qatari Colonel Dawdi, had tortured them in the first days after their arrest, when they had been held incommunicado; the two Russians alleged that they had suffered beatings, sleep deprivation and attacks by guard dogs. Based on these allegations and the fact that the two officers were arrested within an extraterritorial compound belonging to the Russian embassy, Russia demanded the immediate release of its citizens. They were represented by an attorney of the law firm founded by Nikolai Yegorov, a friend and fellow student of Vladimir Putin at Leningrad State University. The Qatari prosecutors concluded that the suspects had received the order to murder Yandarbiev from Defence Minister Sergei Ivanov. On June 30, 2004, both defendants were sentenced to life imprisonment; in passing sentence, the judge stated that they had acted on orders from the Russian leadership.

The verdict caused severe tensions between Qatar and Russia, and on December 23, 2004, Qatar agreed to extradite the prisoners to Russia, where they would serve out their life sentence. The agents received a heroes' welcome on returning to Moscow on the same day and disappeared from public view shortly afterwards. The Russian prison authorities admitted in February 2005 that they were not in jail, and said that the sentence handed down in Qatar was "irrelevant" in Russia.

== Related events ==
On June 1, 2004, Leonid Parfyonov, one of the leading NTV journalists, was fired from the channel allegedly for making public the decision of the channel direction that had forbidden him to present a TV interview with Malika Yandarbiyeva, widow of Zelimkhan Yandarbiyev.
