= Abdulaziz bin Mohieddin Khoja =

Saudi politician and diplomat (born 1940)

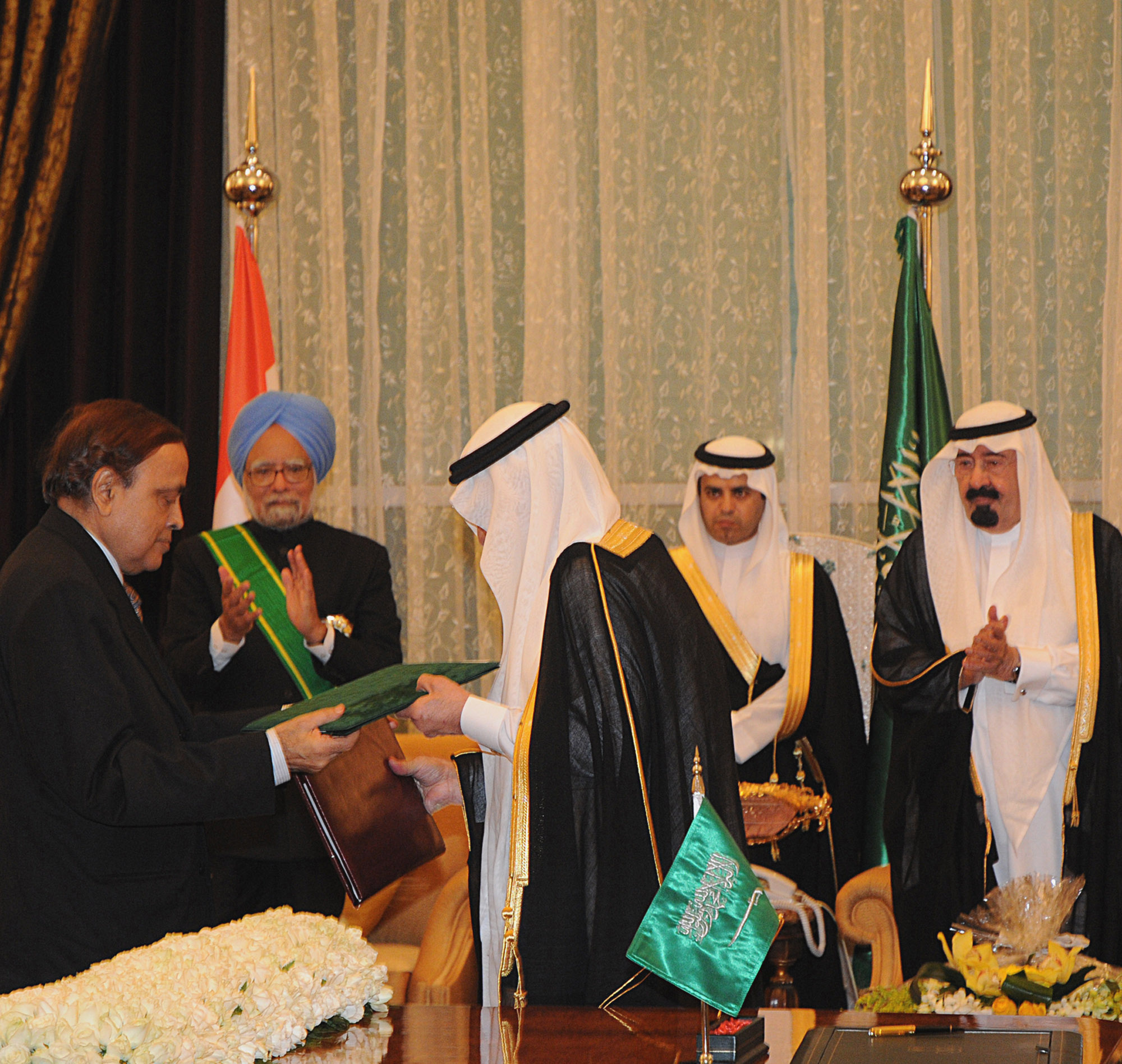

Minister of Culture and Information
- In office 14 February 2009 – November 2014
- Prime Minister: King Abdullah
- Preceded by: Iyad bin Amin Madani
- Succeeded by: Abdulaziz bin Abdullah Al Khudairi

Ambassador of the Custodian of the Two Holy Mosques to the Russian Federation
- In office 1991–1996
- Succeeded by: Fawzi bin Abdul Majeed Shobokshi

Personal details
- Born: 1940 (age 85–86) Mecca
- Education: King Saud University; Birmingham University

Abdulaziz bin Mohieddin Khoja (Arabic: عبد العزيز خوجة; born 1940) is a former ambassador of Saudi Arabia and the minister of culture and information between 2009 and 2014.

== Early life and education ==
Khoja was born in Mecca in 1940. He obtained a Bachelor of Science degree from King Saud University. Then he earned a Master of Science degree in organic chemistry in Birmingham University in 1967. He also holds a PhD in organic chemistry at Birmingham University in 1969.

== Career ==
Khoja was appointed dean of the faculty of education in Mecca in 1979, and his term lasted until 1984. Then he served as the undersecretary for information affairs at the ministry of information from 1984 to 1991. Later, he served as the Saudi Ambassador to various countries, including Turkey (1991), Russia and Morocco. He was also Saudi ambassador to Lebanon and was in office from 2004 to 2009. During this period of time, King Abdullah's foreign policy towards Lebanon was highly intense and also seen as an interventionist approach. On 14 February 2009, Khoja was appointed minister of culture and information, replacing Iyad bin Amin Madani in the post who had been in office since February 2005. Khoja's appointment was regarded as part of King Abdullah's reform initiatives.

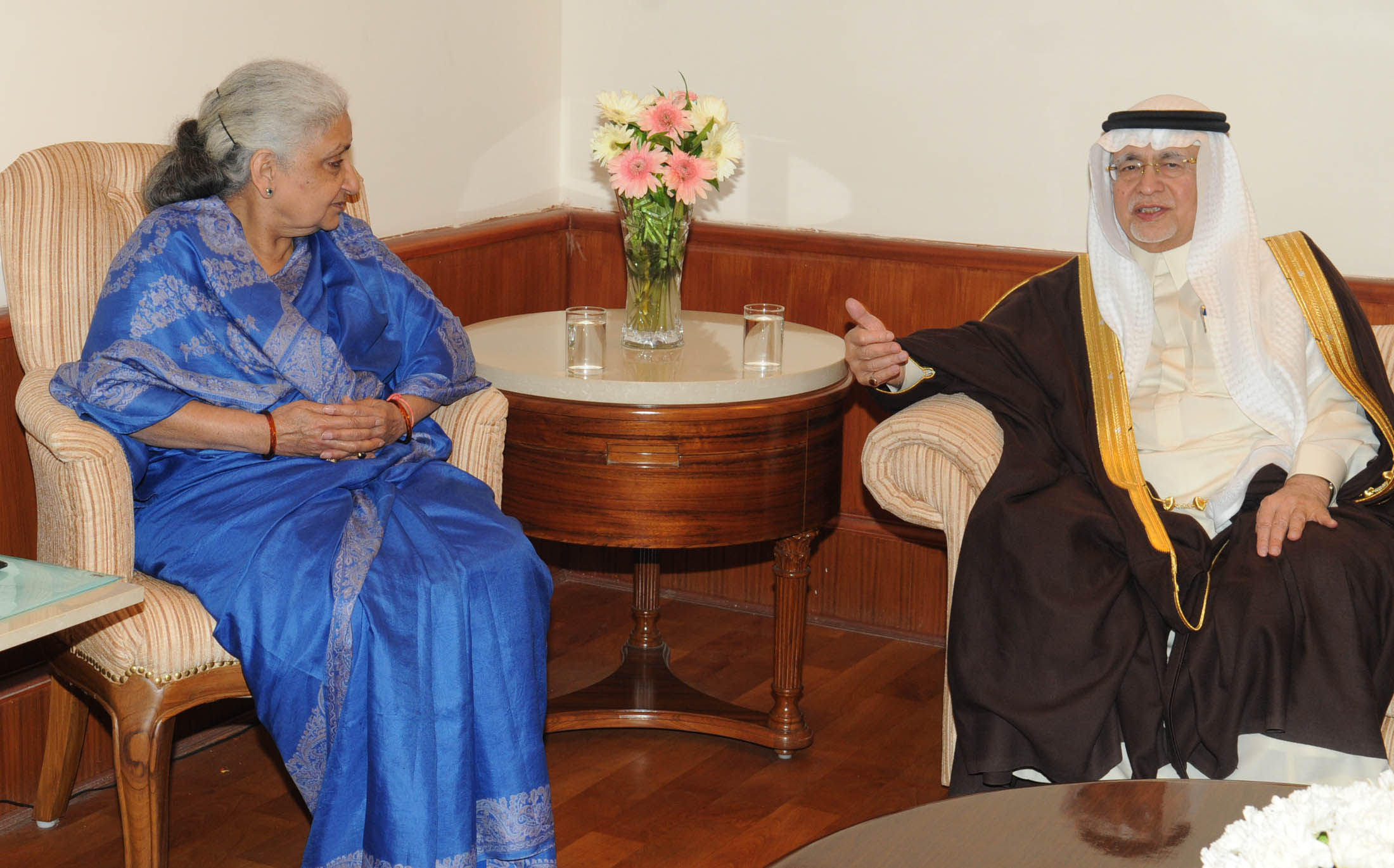
Abdulaziz Khoja met with Indian Culture Minister Chandresh Kumari Katoch in New Delhi, 2014.

Khoja's term as the minister of culture and information ended in November 2014 when he was fired from the office. Abdulaziz bin Abdullah Al Khudairi replaced him in the post on 8 December 2014. On 11 January 2016, he was appointed as the ambassador of the Kingdom of Saudi Arabia to the Kingdom of Morocco (for the second time) with the rank of minister and continued in his role until 19 November 2019.

Khoja is considered to be a relative liberal and was close to King Abdullah, former ruler of Saudi Arabia. Khoja is also a poet. However, some of his works are banned in Saudi Arabia, although he himself was the minister of culture and information.

== Other positions ==
Khoja was the chairman of the General Assembly of Makkah Establishment for Publishing and Printing, publisher of now-defunct newspaper Al Nadwa (newspaper). As of 2011 he was also the chairman of the International Islamic News Agency (IINA) Executive Council.

=== Book ===
In 2020 Khoja published his memoirs in Arabic, titled The Experience: Interactions of Culture, Politics, and Media, printed by Jadawel publishing, a Beirut-based company.

Political offices
Preceded by Iyad bin Amin Madani	Minister of Information and Culture; 2009-2014	Succeeded by Abdulaziz bin Abdullah Al Khudairi
