= Yousef Al-Othaimeen =

Saudi Arabian politician

- يوسف العثيمين
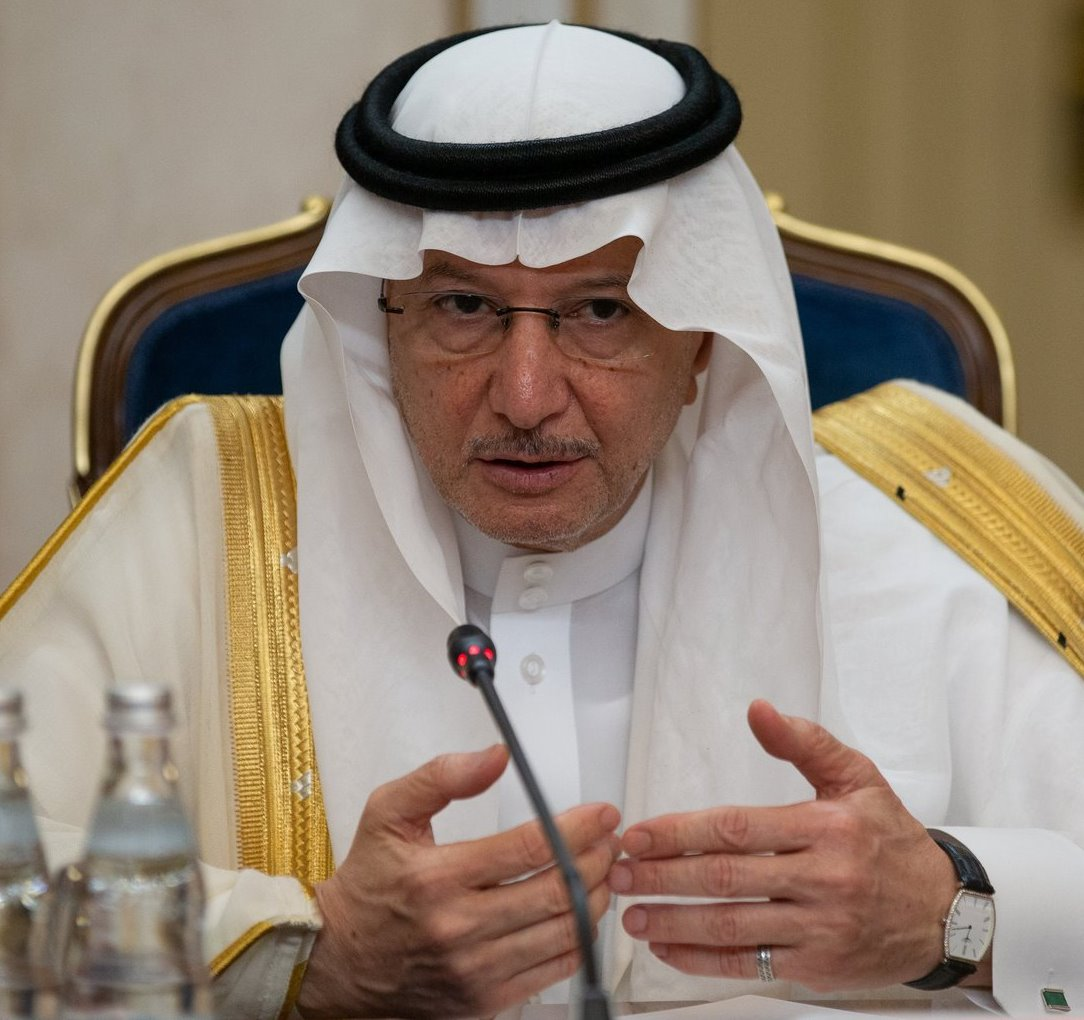
- Al-Othaimeen in 2019

11th Secretary-General of Organization of Islamic Cooperation
- In office 1 November 2016 – 29 November 2020
- Preceded by: Iyad bin Amin Madani
- Succeeded by: Hissein Brahim Taha

Personal details
- Born: Saudi Arabia
- Education: King Saud University (B.A.); Ohio University (M.A); American University (Ph.D)

Yousef bin Ahmad Al-Othaimeen (Arabic: يوسف بن أحمد العثيمين) is a Saudi Arabian politician who served as secretary-general of the Organisation of Islamic Cooperation (OIC) from November 2016, when Iyad bin Amin Madani stepped down for health reasons, to 29 November 2020.

== Education ==
Al-Othaimeen has a bachelor's degree in social studies from King Saud University in Riyadh (1977), a master's in political sociology from Ohio University (1982), and a PhD in political sociology from the American University in Washington DC (1986).

== The Muslim 500 Mention ==
He is also featured in 2019 The Muslim 500 Publication as one of the most influential Muslims.

== Posts Held ==
Positions held by Yousuf
Positions	Organisation	From	To
Director General of Cabinet and Chief Adviser	Islamic Cooperation (OIC)	2016	
Minister of Social Affairs	Kingdom of Saudi Arabia		
Secretary General	King Abdullah bin Abdulaziz Foundation for Housing Development		
Director General	Prince Salman Charity Society for Orphans’ Care		
Assistant Deputy Minister	Social Welfare at the Ministry of Labour and Social Affairs, Kingdom of Saudi Arabia		
Assistant Deputy Minister	Rehabilitation of the Handicapped at the Ministry of Labour and Social Affairs		
Adviser	Minister of Labour and Social Affairs, Kingdom of Saudi Arabia		
Assistant Lecturer	King Saud University and Assistant Professor		
Minister	Social Affairs for the Kingdom of Saudi Arabia	2007	2015

.

== Activities ==
In March 2018, Al-Othaimeen met with the Pope to discuss the migration crisis and the plight of the Rohingya.

On 25 February 2019, he said that the OIC Council of Foreign Ministers considered the actions perpetrated against Azerbaijani civilians in the 1992 Khojaly Massacre as war crimes, crimes against humanity and genocide.

Diplomatic posts
Preceded by Iyad bin Amin Madani	Secretary General of the OIC; 2016-2020	Succeeded by Hissein Brahim Taha
