= Russia–Yemen relations =

- Russia: Yemen

Diplomatic mission
- Embassy of Russia, Sana'a: Embassy of Yemen, Moscow

Russia and Yemen enjoy both warm and friendly relations that goes back to more than a century. Russia has supported both the Yemen Arab Republic and the People's Democratic Republic of Yemen on several occasions and established close relations with them. After Yemeni unification, both countries maintain close ties.

== History ==
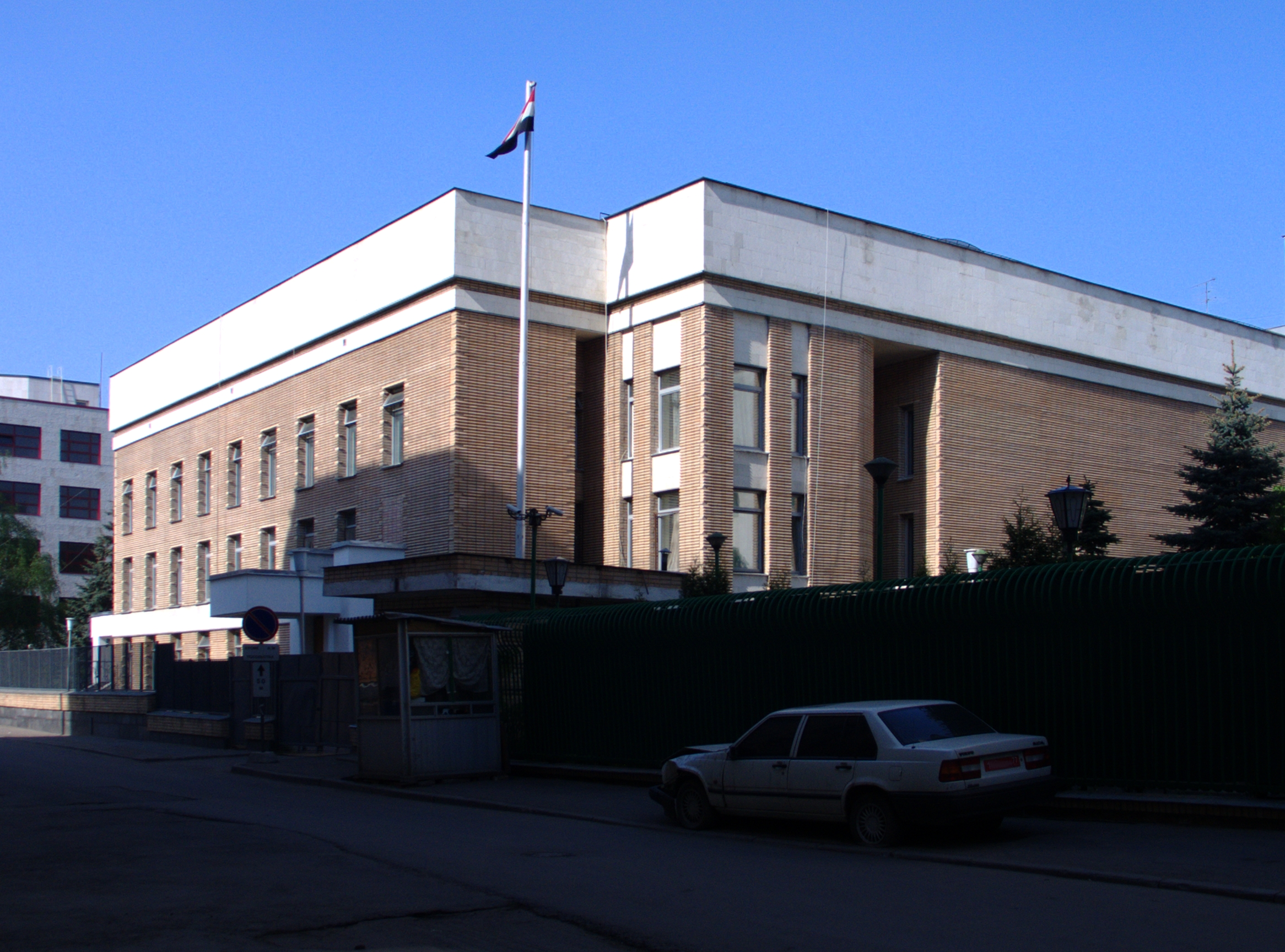
Embassy of Yemen in Khamovniki District, Moscow

Relations between Russia and Yemen goes back more than 80 years ago.

=== Soviet Union ===
The Mutawakkilite Kingdom of Yemen and the Soviet Union signed a friendship and cooperation treaty on November 1, 1928. In the treaty the Soviet government recognized the independence of Yemen. The treaty was renewed for the first time in 1939. But because of World War II, the relationship was interrupted. In 1955 Yemen and the Soviet Union signed an agreement on economic cooperation. In October 1962, the Soviet Union became the first country in the World to recognize the Yemen Arab Republic. On March 21, 1964, the Yemen Arab Republic and the Soviet Union signed a friendship in addition to strengthening economic and military relations between the two countries. On December 3, 1967 the Soviet Union recognized the People's Democratic Republic of Yemen and in 1968 the two countries established strong diplomatic and military relations. In addition to the Soviet Union the People's Democratic Republic of Yemen established close ties with the People's Republic of China, Cuba, East Germany, and the Palestine Liberation Organization. The Soviet Union had close and friendly relations between both North Yemen and South Yemen. After Yemeni unification on May 22, 1990 the Soviet Union recognized the Republic of Yemen.

=== Russian Federation ===
After the dissolution of the Soviet Union, the Republic of Yemen recognized the Russian Federation on December 30, 1991. Since then relations between Russia and Yemen have been very close and friendly. Yemeni President Ali Abdullah Saleh has visited Moscow on several occasions and has met with both Russian Presidents Vladimir Putin and Dmitry Medvedev.

== See also ==
- Foreign relations of Russia
- Foreign relations of Yemen
- Russia and the Middle East
- List of ambassadors of Russia to Yemen
