= List of ambassadors of Russia to Saudi Arabia =

Ambassador of the Russian Federation to the Kingdom of Saudi Arabia
- سفير الاتحاد الروسي لدى المملكة العربية السعودية
- Emblem of the Ministry of Foreign Affairs of Russia
- Incumbent; Sergei Kozlov since 20 February 2017
- Ministry of Foreign Affairs (Russia)
- Style: His Excellency
- Seat: Riyadh
- Nominator: The president of Russia
- Formation: 1926
- First holder: Karim Khakimov
- Website: Embassy of Russia in Riyadh

The ambassador extraordinary and plenipotentiary of the Russian Federation to the Kingdom of Saudi Arabia is the official representative of the president and the government of the Russian Federation to the king and the government of Saudi Arabia.

The ambassador and his staff work at large in the Embassy of Russia in Riyadh. There is a Consulate General in Jeddah.

The post of Russian ambassador to Saudi Arabia is currently held by Sergei Kozlov, incumbent since 20 February 2017.

== History of diplomatic relations ==
The Soviet Union was the first country to recognize and establish full diplomatic relations with Kingdom of Saudi Arabia in 1926. Karim Khakimov was the first ambassador to the kingdom. He visited King Ibn Saud's residence and delivered a formal note recognizing and approving his status as a King of Saudi Arabia from the Soviet Union and its allies. Karim Khakimov was also known as the Russian Lawrence of Arabia. His mission was terminated in July 1928 but he was again appointed ambassador on December 7, 1935, and remained so until September 6, 1937. When Khakimov returned to the Soviet Union he was executed on the order of Soviet leader Joseph Stalin in 1938 on suspicion of espionage. Khakimov's execution greatly angered Ibn Saud, who referred to Khakimov as his closest friend. The relations between the two states deteriorated and the embassy in Riyadh was closed, with Soviet Muslims prevented from attending hajj. This lasted until 1990, when relations were re-established and restrictions on the Soviet pilgrimages were also removed. Gennady Pavlovich Tarasov was appointed as the new ambassador to the Kingdom of Saudi Arabia.

== List of representatives (1924–present) ==
=== Soviet Union to Saudi Arabia (1924–1991) ===
Name	Title	Appointment	Termination	Notes
Karim Khakimov	Diplomatic representative (until February 1926); Consul General (after February 1926)	24 April 1924	July 1928	
Nazir Tyuryakulov	Consul General (until 1 January 1930); Diplomatic representative (after 1 January 1930)	July 1928	7 December 1935	
Karim Khakimov	Diplomatic representative	7 December 1935	6 September 1937	
Diplomatic relations interrupted (1938 - 1990)
Gennady Tarasov	Ambassador	18 October 1990	25 December 1991	

=== Russian Federation to Saudi Arabia (1991–present) ===
Name	Title	Appointment	Termination	Notes
Gennady Tarasov	Ambassador	25 December 1991	6 September 1996	
Igor Melikhov	Ambassador	6 September 1996	17 October 2000	
Andrey Baklanov	Ambassador	17 October 2000	22 September 2005	
Viktor Kudryavtsev	Ambassador	22 September 2005	8 February 2010	
Oleg Ozerov	Ambassador	8 February 2010	20 February 2017	
Sergei Kozlov	Ambassador	20 February 2017		

== See also ==
- Foreign relations of Saudi Arabia
