= Knowledge Economic City, Medina =

Knowledge Economic City (KEC) مدينة المعرفة الاقتصادية
- Province: Madinah Province

Government
  - Chairman: Iyad bin Amin Madani
  - Vice Chairman: Abdul Raouf Mohammad Manna

Area
  - Total: 4.8 km^{2} (1.9 sq mi)
- Website: http://www.madinahkec.com (site under construction : 14/05/2020)

Medina Knowledge Economic City was launched by King Abdullah bin Abdulaziz al Saud in June 2006 and is the third of six economic cities announced by Amr Dabbagh, Governor of the Saudi Arabian General Investment Authority. The 30 billion riyal ($7 Billion USD) project is located in Madinah, the second-holiest of three key cities in Islam.

Knowledge Economic City Master Plan

The master-plan was designed by Creative Kingdom Dubai. Knowledge Economic City is a project to position Saudi Arabia and Saudi Arabian entrepreneurs as leaders in knowledge based industries and aims to attract and develop talent from around the world.

20,000 jobs and accommodation for 150,000 people will be created by the project which is expected to bring about 10 billion Riyals a year into the region once it is completed by 2020.

According to the Saudi Real Estate Companion, the development should be primarily considered a residential development, which is expected to greatly increase the residential supply in the city. One of the key drivers for the development is likely to be the legal framework with regards to non-national (and non-GCC) ownership in the area.

Since its launch KEC has signed Memoranda of Understanding and contracts with several local companies and with government and private sector organisations from Malaysia and Canada. The latest have been MoUs signed with Cisco and CompTIA . The Cisco MoU is intended to provide access to networking technologies, while the CompTIA signing is to ensure Knowledge Economic City knowledge workers with internationally recognised IT qualifications.

Several major companies are involved and the development consortium members include: Savola Group (Publicly Listed Company), Taiba Investments and Real Estate Development Company (Publicly Listed Company), Project Management Development Company PMDC, and Quad Intl’ Real Estate Development Co. (Management).

Knowledge Economic City also has some subsidiary organisations, most important of which is Madinah Institute for Leadership and Entrepreneurship located in Madinah, Saudi Arabia.

Prior to the signing in February and March 2008 of Memoranda of Understanding with Malaysia’s Multimedia Development Corporation (MDeC) and Multimedia University, major MoUs had been signed with KSA’s Siraj Capital Ltd and PMDC, Savola Group Co and Malaz Group. Key Consultancy contracts have been awarded to HOK Canada, IBI Group and Malaysia’s MSC Technology Centre.

They and other partners will work with Seera City Real Estate Development, the company set up to manage the project, to identify opportunities and develop each of the facets of the city. souks of Medina
