= List of ambassadors of Russia to Qatar =

Ambassador of the Russian Federation to the State of Qatar
- Emblem of the Russian Foreign Ministry
- Incumbent; Dmitry Dogadkin since 9 November 2021
- Ministry of Foreign Affairs; Embassy of Russia in Doha
- Style: His Excellency; The Honourable
- Reports to: Minister of Foreign Affairs
- Seat: Doha
- Appointer: President of Russia
- Term length: At the pleasure of the president
- Website: Embassy of Russia in Qatar

The ambassador of Russia to Qatar is the official representative of the president and the government of the Russian Federation to the emir and the government of Qatar.

The ambassador to Qatar and his staff work at large in the Russian embassy in Doha. The current Russian ambassador to Qatar is Dmitry Dogadkin, incumbent since 9 November 2021.

== History of diplomatic relations ==
Diplomatic relations between the Soviet Union and Qatar were established on 1 August 1988. Awdy Kulyýew was appointed as the initial chargé d'affaires on 1 September 1988, serving as such until the appointment of Vladimir Vodyakhin as the ambassador to Qatar on 28 September 1989. With the dissolution of the Soviet Union in 1991, Qatar recognised the Russian Federation as its successor state, and Vodyakhin continued as ambassador from Russia until 1993.

Diplomatic relations were strained in the early 2010s over the issue of the Syrian civil war, with Russia supporting the government forces, and Qatar the opposition. Matters reached a head on 29 November 2011 when the Russian ambassador to Qatar, Vladimir Titorenko, claimed he had been assaulted at Doha International Airport by Qatari security forces who attempted to examine his diplomatic bag. Russian president Dmitry Medvedev recalled Titorenko in protest on 7 March 2012, and relations with Qatar were downgraded to the level of chargé d'affaires. Relations were restored to the level of ambassadorial exchanges with the appointment of Nurmakhmad Kholov on 22 November 2013.

== List of representatives of Russia to Qatar (1988–present) ==
=== Ambassadors of the Soviet Union to Qatar (1988–1991) ===
Name	Title	Appointment	Termination	Notes
Awdy Kulyýew	Chargé d'affaires	1 September 1988	28 September 1989	
Vladimir Vodyakhin	Ambassador	28 September 1989	25 December 1991	

=== Ambassadors of the Russian Federation to Qatar (1991–present) ===
Name	Title	Appointment	Termination	Notes
Vladimir Vodyakhin	Ambassador	25 December 1991	27 October 1993	
Igor Melikhov	Ambassador	27 October 1993	6 September 1996	
Nikolai Tikhomirov	Ambassador	25 November 1996	5 August 2000	
Viktor Kudryavtsev	Ambassador	5 August 2000	15 July 2005	
Andrey Andreyev	Ambassador	15 July 2005	23 July 2009	
Vladimir Titorenko	Ambassador	23 July 2009	7 March 2012	
Dmitry Trofimov	Chargé d'affaires	7 March 2012	22 November 2013	
Nurmakhmad Kholov	Ambassador	22 November 2013	9 November 2021	
Dmitry Dogadkin	Ambassador	9 November 2021		
