= List of ambassadors of Russia to Yemen =

Ambassador of the Russian Federation to the Republic of Yemen
- Emblem of the Russian Foreign Ministry
- Incumbent; Yevgeny Kudrov since 1 October 2025
- Ministry of Foreign Affairs; Embassy of Russia in Sanaa
- Style: His Excellency
- Reports to: Minister of Foreign Affairs
- Seat: Sanaa
- Appointer: President of Russia
- Term length: At the pleasure of the president
- Website: Embassy of Russia in Yemen

The ambassador extraordinary and plenipotentiary of Russia to Yemen is the official representative of the president and the government of the Russian Federation to the president and the government of Yemen.

The ambassador and his staff work at large in the Embassy of Russia in Sanaa. The post of Russian ambassador to Yemen is currently held by Yevgeny Kudrov, incumbent since 1 October 2025.

== History of diplomatic relations ==
Diplomatic relations between the Soviet Union and the Kingdom of Yemen were first formalized on 1 November 1928. Georgy Astakhov served as diplomatic representative between May 1928 and November 1928, and then Karim Khakimov took over as plenipotentiary representative between 1929 and 1932. Despite this, no long-term formal exchange of diplomats was agreed, until 31 October 1955, with an agreement to open missions on 23 June 1956. Relations were initially handled through the Soviet embassy in Egypt, with the incumbent Soviet envoy to Egypt, Yevgeny Kiselyov, given dual accreditation as the non-resident envoy to Yemen on 4 August 1956. Kiselyov was succeeded by Vladimir Yerofeyev on 14 August 1959, though the Soviet mission in Yemen had opened the previous year. Yerofeyev would eventually serve until 18 July 1962, with the establishment of consular relations on 9 June 1962, and the appointment of Nikolai Sulitsky as the first envoy accredited solely to Yemen. Shortly afterwards, the Yemeni monarchy was overthrown in a coup on 26 September 1962, establishing the Yemen Arab Republic. The Soviet Union became the first state to recognize the new regime, on 1 October 1962. Agreement was reached with the new regime to upgrade the mission to an embassy, and from 14 February 1963, Sulitsky served as ambassador to the Yemen Arab Republic.

The neighbouring British-controlled Protectorate of South Arabia and Federation of South Arabia had been facing an ongoing insurgency known as the Aden Emergency, resulting in the Withdrawal from Aden on 30 September 1967, and the declaration of the South Yemen, formally the People's Democratic Republic of Yemen, that day. The Soviet Union was one of the first countries to recognize the new state, and diplomatic relations were established in early December 1967. On 18 December the two countries agreed to exchange embassies. Vladimir Startsev became the first Soviet ambassador to the People's Democratic Republic of Yemen, appointed on 4 April 1968. Ambassadors were thereafter exchanged between the Soviet Union and both the Yemen Arab Republic and the People's Democratic Republic of Yemen. With Yemeni unification occurring on 22 May 1990, the incumbent Soviet ambassador to the Yemen Arab Republic, Veniamin Popov, continued in post as ambassador to the new state of the Republic of Yemen.

The dissolution of the Soviet Union took place the following year, and Yemen recognized the Russian Federation as its successor state. The incumbent Soviet ambassador, Igor Ivashchenko, continued as the Russian ambassador until 1995. Representation continued through the remainder of the twentieth century and into the twenty-first. By the late 2010s, the security situation in the country had deteriorated during the Yemeni civil war, and the Russian embassy was evacuated. Ambassador Vladimir Dedushkin served until 30 November 2021, after which representation was by chargé d'affaires, with the Minister-Counselor of the Russian embassy in Saudi Arabia, Yevgeny Kudrov, appointed to this role. The embassy in Yemen was reopened in December 2024, with Kudrov continuing as chargé d'affaires until 1 October 2025, when he was appointed the new ambassador to Yemen.

== List of representatives (1928–present) ==
=== Soviet Union to the Kingdom of Yemen (1928-1962) ===
| Name | Title | Appointment | Termination | Notes |
|---|---|---|---|---|
| Georgy Astakhov | Diplomatic representative | May 1928 | November 1928 | |
| Karim Khakimov | Plenipotentiary representative | 1929 | 1932 | |
| Yevgeny Kiselyov | Envoy | 4 August 1956 | 14 August 1959 | Credentials presented on 14 January 1958; Concurrently Soviet envoy to Egypt |
| Vladimir Yerofeyev | Envoy | 14 August 1959 | 18 July 1962 | Credentials presented on 7 February 1960; Concurrently Soviet envoy to Egypt |
| Nikolai Sulitsky | Envoy | 18 July 1962 | 1 October 1962 | Credentials presented on 9 August 1962 |

=== Soviet Union to the Yemen Arab Republic (1962-1990) ===
| Name | Title | Appointment | Termination | Notes |
|---|---|---|---|---|
| Nikolai Sulitsky | Envoy until 14 February 1963; Ambassador after 14 February 1963 | 1 October 1962 | 7 September 1966 | Credentials presented on 19 February 1963 |
| Mirzo Rakhmatov | Ambassador | 7 September 1966 | 26 May 1972 | Credentials presented on 24 September 1966 |
| Vasily Kornev | Ambassador | 26 May 1972 | 15 July 1980 | Credentials presented on 15 August 1972 |
| Oleg Peresypkin | Ambassador | 15 July 1980 | 3 September 1984 | Credentials presented on 8 September 1980 |
| Anatoly Filyov | Ambassador | 3 September 1984 | 9 June 1987 | Credentials presented on 22 September 1984 |
| Veniamin Popov | Ambassador | 9 June 1987 | 22 May 1990 | |
Unification of North Yemen and South Yemen on 22 May 1990

=== Soviet Union to the People's Democratic Republic of Yemen (1968-1990) ===
| Name | Title | Appointment | Termination | Notes |
|---|---|---|---|---|
| Vladimir Startsev | Ambassador | 4 April 1968 | 26 July 1972 | Credentials presented on 7 May 1967 |
| Vladimir Polyakov | Ambassador | 26 July 1972 | 4 April 1974 | Credentials presented on 27 August 1972 |
| Aleksandr Semioshkin | Ambassador | 25 June 1974 | 2 August 1975 | Credentials presented on 14 July 1974 |
| Vladimir Kaboshkin | Ambassador | 2 August 1975 | 19 December 1978 | Credentials presented on 27 September 1975 |
| Feliks Fedotov | Ambassador | 19 December 1978 | 3 May 1982 | Credentials presented on 6 January 1979 |
| Vladislav Zhukov | Ambassador | 3 May 1982 | 15 July 1986 | Credentials presented on 26 May 1982 |
| Albert Rachkov | Ambassador | 15 July 1986 | 9 August 1990 | |
Unification of North Yemen and South Yemen on 22 May 1990

=== Soviet Union to the Republic of Yemen (1990-1991) ===
| Name | Title | Appointment | Termination | Notes |
|---|---|---|---|---|
| Veniamin Popov | Ambassador | 22 May 1990 | 18 March 1991 | |
| Igor Ivashchenko | Ambassador | 18 March 1991 | 25 December 1991 | |

=== Russian Federation to the Republic of Yemen (1991-present) ===
| Name | Title | Appointment | Termination | Notes |
|---|---|---|---|---|
| Igor Ivashchenko | Ambassador | 25 December 1991 | 14 April 1995 | |
| Nikolai Gribkov | Ambassador | 14 April 1995 | 12 November 1998 | |
| Aleksandr Kalugin | Ambassador | 12 November 1998 | 10 September 2002 | |
| Aleksandr Zasypkin | Ambassador | 10 September 2002 | 18 October 2006 | |
| Vladimir Trofimov | Ambassador | 18 October 2006 | 18 August 2010 | |
| Sergey Kozlov | Ambassador | 18 August 2010 | 16 August 2013 | |
| Vladimir Dedushkin | Ambassador | 16 August 2013 | 30 November 2021 | |
| Yevgeny Kudrov | Chargé d'affaires from December 2021 to 1 October 2025; Ambassador after 1 October 2025 | December 2021 | | Credentials presented on 20 November 2025 |
