= Iyad bin Amin Madani =

Saudi politician (born 1946)

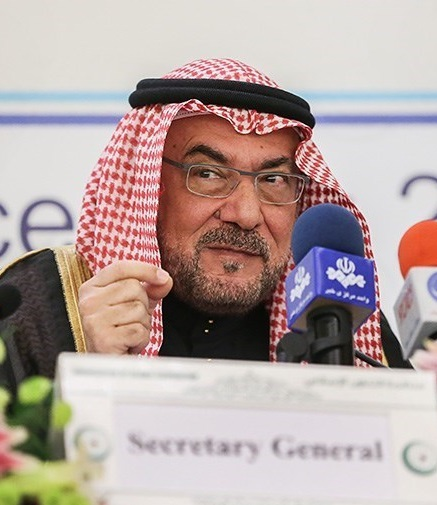
- Madani in 2014

Secretary-General of Organisation of Islamic Cooperation
- In office 31 January 2014 – 1 November 2016
- Preceded by: Ekmeleddin İhsanoğlu
- Succeeded by: Yousef Al-Othaimeen

Minister of Information and Culture
- In office 14 February 2005 – 14 February 2009
- Prime Minister: King Fahd; King Abdullah
- Preceded by: Office established
- Succeeded by: Abdulaziz Khoja

Minister of Hajj
- In office June 1999 – 14 February 2005
- Prime Minister: King Fahd
- Preceded by: Mahmud Mohame
- Succeeded by: Foad Farsi

Personal details
- Born: 26 April 1946 (age 80) Mecca, Saudi Arabia
- Education: Arizona State University
- Awards: Order of Loyalty to the Crown of Malaysia
- Website: Official website

Iyad bin Amin Madani (Arabic: إﻳﺎﺩ ﺑﻦ أﻣﻴﻦ ﻣﺪﻧﻲ; born 26 April 1946) is a Saudi politician who served in different cabinet posts. He was the secretary general of the Organisation of Islamic Cooperation from 2014 to November 2016. He was the first Saudi official to hold that position.

== Early life and education ==
Madani was born in Mecca on 26 April 1946. He holds a bachelor's degree in production administration, which he obtained from Arizona State University in 1969.

== Career ==
Madani began his career as general director in a Saudi Airlines administrative office in 1970. Then, he joined media; he was editor-in-chief of Saudi Gazette between 1976 and 1980 being the first editor of the daily. At the same time he served as general director of the Okaz Organization for Press and Publication until his resignation in April 1993.

He founded and headed a media and marketing consultant group, Fikra-Media and Marketing Consultants, in 1993, specialized in the fields of information, communication, advertising, marketing and manpower development.

In 1997 Madani was appointed to the shoura council as a member. He served there until June 1999 when he was appointed hajj minister. He served in the post from 1999 to February 2005. Next, he was appointed minister of culture and information in February 2005, replacing Fouad bin Abdulsalam Al Farsi, who in turn became Hajj minister. On 1 August 2005, Madani as information minister announced the death of King Fahd on state television. Madani was elected as the head of the Islamic International News Agency (IINA) and the Organization of Islamic Broadcasting in 2007. He was in office as information minister until 2009 when he was replaced by Abdulaziz Al Khoja in the post. During his tenure, Madani drew criticisms from Saudi clerics due to his tolerance towards the publications that were questioning the strong effects of the religious establishment in Saudi Arabia.

Then Madani was appointed chairman of the board of directors of Knowledge Economic City in Madinah on 10 March 2012, replacing Sami Mohsen Baroum in the post. He also served as vice president of King Abdullah bin Abdulaziz Foundation for housing development.

In November 2012, Saudi Arabia nominated Madani to the post of secretary general of the Organisation of Islamic Cooperation (OIC) at the 39th session of the Council of Foreign Ministers of OIC member states in Djibouti. On 2 February 2013, Arab News reported that Madani would replace Ekmeleddin İhsanoğlu as secretary-general of the OIC. His appointment was officially announced after the 12th Summit of the OIC in Cairo on 8 February 2013. Madani's term as secretary general of OIC was effective from January 2014.

Madani resigned from the post in October 2016, citing health issues, following Egyptian complaints after he mocked Egyptian president Abdel Fattah el-Sisi for claiming to have had only water in his fridge for much of his life.

== Honour ==
=== Foreign honour ===
- Honorary Commander of the Order of Loyalty to the Crown of Malaysia (P.S.M.) (2004)

== Recognition ==
Madani was awarded by the Malaysian government the prize, the Darjah Kebesaran Panglima Setia Mahkota (Knight of the Most Distinguished Order of Crown) carrying coveted title of “Tan Sri”, in March 2009 due to his efforts in reinforcing solidarity of Muslim Ummah and his significant contributions in supporting the Saudi-Malaysian ties. He is also a recipient of the Certificate of Appreciation from Arab American Chamber of Commerce (1987); Saudi Arabian Airlines Shield for 1971 Ideal Employee; a special letter of thanks and appreciation from the President of Turkey; Sash and Citation of the Second Degree from the Sultan of Oman; Ordin - Al Merio Della Republica Italiana, Italy, and the Order of Independence from the President of the Republic of Kosovo in 2020.

Diplomatic posts
Preceded by Ekmeleddin İhsanoğlu	Secretary General of the OIC; 2014–2016	Succeeded by Yousef Al Othaimeen
