= Karim Khakimov =

Tatar revolutionary and Soviet diplomat

Karim Abdraufovich Khakimov
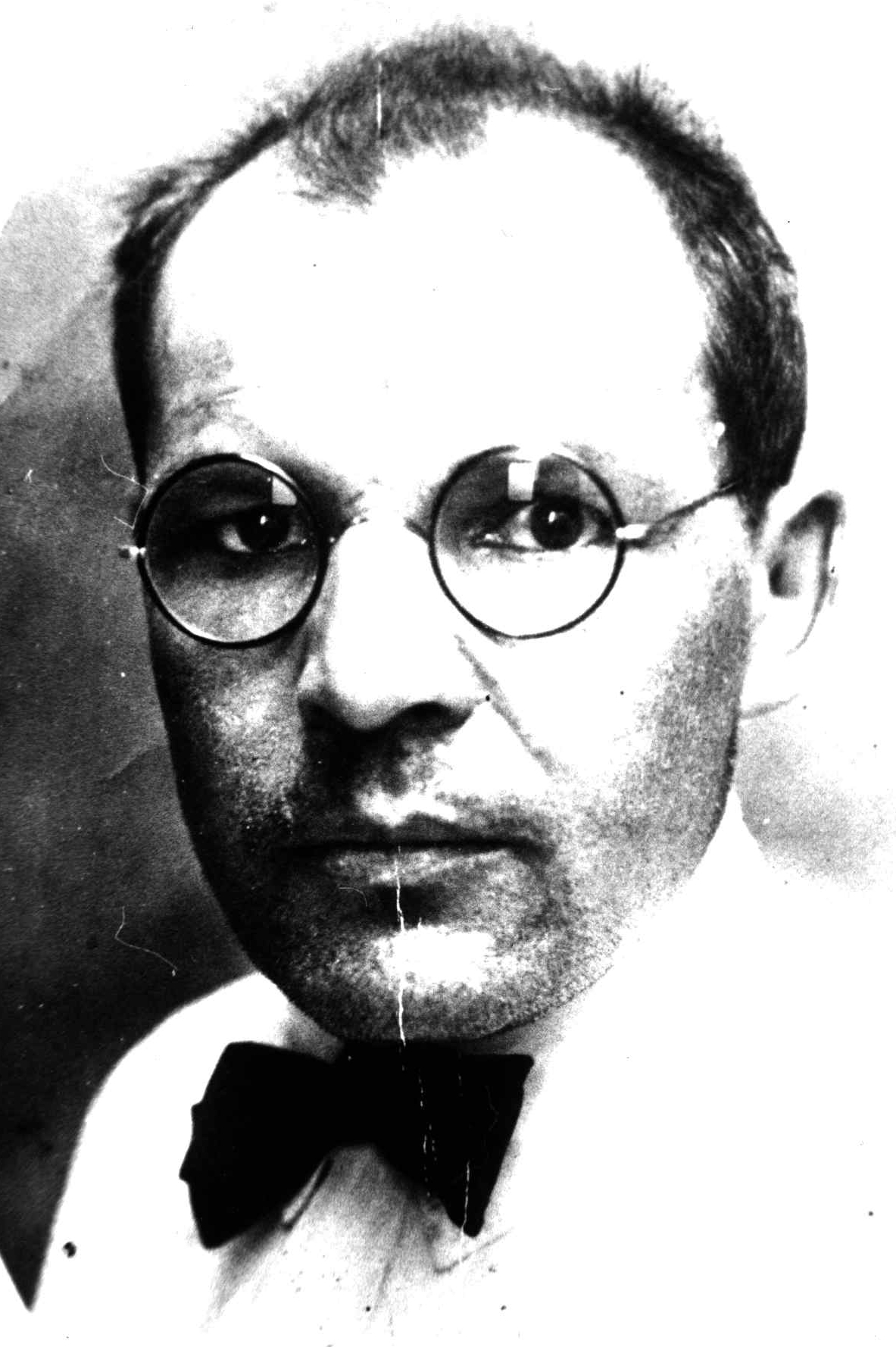
- Karim Khakimov

Plenipotentiary Representative of the Soviet Union to the Kingdom of Hejaz and Nejd (later Saudi Arabia)
- In office 1924 – 1932; 1935–1937

Personal details
- Born: December 28, 1890 Bashkortostan, Russian Empire
- Died: January , 1938 Moscow, Soviet Union
- Party: Russian Communist Party (Bolsheviks)
- Occupation: Diplomat

Karim Abdraufovich Khakimov (Tatar: Кәрим Габдрәүф улы Хәкимов, romanized: Kärim Gabdräüf ulı Xäkimow; 28 December 1890 – January 1938) was a Tatar revolutionary who became a diplomat for the Soviet Union. He was one of the first plenipotentiary representatives of Soviet Russia in the Arab world and made a significant contribution to the establishment of good relations between the newly established Soviet Republic and the Arab-Persian world, especially within the recently unified Saudi Arabia.

Khakimov joined the Russian Communist Party in April 1918 in Samara.

== Mission to Jeddah ==
In August 1924, Khakimov arrived in Jeddah, at that time a part of the Kingdom of Hejaz. Soon after his arrival, the Hejaz-Nejd War broke out and Jeddah was besieged by the forces of King Abdulaziz. In April of 1925, Khakimov undertook a pilgrimage to Mecca, meeting Abdulaziz for the first time and forming a strong working relationship. In the following year, Khakimov recognised him as ruler of Hejaz and Nejd on behalf of the Soviet Union. Thus, the USSR became the first state to recognise Abdulaziz as ruler of both kingdoms.

By 1932, relations between Saudi Arabia and the USSR had cooled, partly owing to Khakimov's absence in recent years. He returned to Jeddah in 1935 in an unsuccessful effort to revive the relationship between the two states.

== Imprisonment and death ==
He was recalled from Saudi Arabia in September 1937, arrested in Moscow under suspicion of subversive activity, and executed in January 1938 during the Great Purge.

He was the subject of a biographic documentary, Russian Lawrence of Arabia: Life and death of Karim Khakimov 1892-1938 made by Radik Kudoyarov in 2010.
