= Russia–Syria relations =

- Russia: Syria

Diplomatic mission
- Embassy of Russia, Damascus: Embassy of Syria, Moscow

Russia–Syria relations (Russian: Российско-сирийские отношения; Arabic: العلاقات الروسية السورية) are the bilateral relations between Russia and Syria. Russia has an embassy in Damascus and Syria has an embassy in Moscow. Russia enjoys a historically strong, stable, and friendly relationship with Syria, as it did with most countries within the Arab World up until the Arab Spring. Russia's only Mediterranean naval base for its Black Sea Fleet is located in the Syrian port city of Tartus. Today, the future of the relationship is unclear after fall of the Assad regime, although Russia has thus far been allowed to keep their bases in Syria.

Diplomatic relations between the Soviet Union and the First Syrian Republic were established in July 1944, and an agreement was signed in February 1946 ensuring Soviet support for Syrian independence ahead of the evacuation of French troops in April 1946. During World War II, both countries found themselves on the Allied side, fighting against the Axis powers.

In 1971, under an agreement with President Hafez al-Assad, the Soviet Union opened its naval military base in Tartus, a facility the former Soviet republic continues to use to this day. On 8 October 1980, Syria and the Soviet Union signed a Treaty of Friendship and Cooperation. The treaty runs for twenty years and has automatic five-year extensions unless one of the parties terminates the agreement. It provides for regular consultations on bilateral and multilateral issues of interest, coordination of responses in the event of a crisis, and military cooperation, and remains in force to this day. In January 1992, the Syrian government recognized the Russian Federation as the legal successor to the Soviet Union.

Russia in 2011 and 2012 used its veto power in the United Nations Security Council against resolutions promoted by Western and Arab countries with the intention of preventing possible sanctions or military intervention against the Syrian government, and Russia continued supplying large amounts of arms that Syria's government had earlier contracted to buy and which were used to fight Western-backed rebels. On 30 September 2015, Russia began a military intervention in the Syrian Civil War in support of the Syrian government, consisting of intensive air and cruise missile strikes against several terrorist groups, including ISIS and the Al-Nusra Front (Al-Qaeda's official affiliate in Syria).

In February 2022, the Syrian Foreign Minister Faisal Mekdad announced that Syria supports the decision of its ally Russia to recognise the two breakaway regions of Luhansk and Donetsk in eastern Ukraine. In March 2022, Syria was the only Middle Eastern country (and one of 5 countries in the world) to vote against United Nations General Assembly Resolution ES-11/1, denouncing the Russian invasion of Ukraine and demanding a full withdrawal of Russian forces. On 29 June 2022, Syria announced that it will recognize the "independence and sovereignty" of the two breakaway regions of Luhansk and Donetsk in eastern Ukraine. On 20 July 2022, Syria announced its formal breaking of diplomatic ties with Ukraine, in response to a similar move by Ukraine.

When the Assad regime collapsed on 8 December 2024, Assad fled to Russia to seek asylum while Russian troops began to pull back from the newly formed Syria. However, in mid‑October 2025, the new Syrian leadership and Russia moved to maintain and restore their bilateral relations, with Syrian president Ahmed al-Sharaa meeting Russian President Vladimir Putin in Moscow to reset ties, reaffirm shared interests, and agree to honour past agreements while exploring future cooperation.

== History ==
=== Before 1944 ===
In 1893, the Russian Empire established a consular office in Damascus, then a part of Ottoman Syria. Following the October Revolution (1917), and the creation of the Soviet Union (1922), the Russian presence in Syria came to an end, which continued during the French Mandate period (1923−1946). Although the Soviet Union did not play a political role in the region, it did promote the establishment of the Syrian–Lebanese Communist Party in 1924.

=== 1944–1958 ===
Soviet Union–Syria relations
- Soviet Union: Syria

Diplomatic mission
- Embassy of the Soviet Union, Damascus: Embassy of Syria, Moscow

Soviet Union–Syria relations
- Soviet Union: Syria

Diplomatic mission
- Embassy of the Soviet Union, Damascus: Embassy of Syria, Moscow

Diplomatic relations between the Soviet Union and Syria were established in July 1944. The Soviet Union commenced to take an interest in the Middle East after the Second World War. The two countries signed a secret agreement on 1 February 1946, with the Soviet envoy to Syria and Lebanon Daniel Solod as a signatory for the USSR, in which the Soviet Union agreed to provide military help in the formation of the Syrian Arab Army and prescribed Soviet diplomatic and political support in the international arena. The Soviet Union demonstrated its commitment to this treaty with Andrey Vyshinsky's 15 February 1946 address to the United Nations Security Council calling for the removal of British and French troops from the country. The last French troops were removed from Syria on 17 April 1946. During the Cold War (1947–1991) a stronger political bond developed, and Syria was considered an ally of the Soviet Union in opposition to the Western powers.

In 1949, after the 1948 Arab–Israeli War, Syria experienced a number of military coups and the rise of the Ba'ath Party. Three coups d'état occurred by 1953, ushering in military dictatorships twice in the process. A non-aggression pact was signed on 10 April 1950 further cementing Soviet–Syrian ties. During the Cold War period, each conflict and war that broke out in the Middle East acted as a factor leading Syria to form closer ties with the Soviet Union. Following the military coup d’état of 25 February 1954, the Ba'ath Party came to the fore in Syrian politics.

The West-inspired Baghdad Pact (1955), with its ultimately unsuccessful formation of the Central Treaty Organization, brought Soviet–Syria relations closer diplomatically. In early 1956, Syria made an arms deal with the USSR. After that, in 1956, various teams of Syrians went to the Eastern Bloc countries of Czechoslovakia, Poland, and the USSR for arms, artillery, and Mig-17 training courses for pilots and ground crew. Many Syrian officers and NCOs also underwent courses led by Czechoslovak instructors in Egypt beginning in March 1956, including training for 122-mm cannons, SU-100 anti-tank guns, and T-34 tanks, among other weaponry. Meanwhile, teams from Eastern Bloc countries came to Syria to provide training to the Syrian military. Syrians, however, perceived this agreement as a pact against themselves. Indeed, among the consequences of the Baghdad Pact was not only a deepening of Syrian relations with the Soviet Union but also an alignment of Middle Eastern countries into allied satellites of the Eastern and Western blocs.

The response of the Soviet Union to the Suez Crisis (late October 1956) – threatening to use 'destructive weapons' against Britain and France – increased Soviet prestige in the Middle East. The Syrian President, then in the USSR, requested the Soviet government to intervene and send its pilots to increase the morale of the Arabs. Syrian Foreign Minister, in a talk with Soviet Foreign Minister, even requested the Soviet Union to deploy two squadron of planes along with their pilots after the Suez Crisis.

Soviet aid to Syria accelerated and included military and economic agreements. Between 1955 and 1958, Syria received about $294 million from the Soviet Union for military and economic assistance. Simultaneously, the Ba'ath Party in Syria increased its power and influence, culminating in the 1963 military coup which established a one-party Ba'athist state in Syria. The far-left neo-Ba'athist factions that dominated the Syrian Ba'ath pursued close alliance with Soviet Union. Following the Sixth National Congress in 1963, the party publicly adopted the doctrine of ideological alliance with the Socialist Bloc:

"The Arab Socialist Ba'th Party had placed the question of the struggle against imperialism in its international and human framework and considered the socialist camp a positive, active force in the struggle against imperialism... a homeland crushed and exploited by imperialism render the fundamental starting points of the socialist camp more harmonious with the interests of our Arab homeland and more in sympathy with our Arab people."

=== 1966–2010 ===
Hafez al-Assad meeting with Soviet leader Leonid Brezhnev (1977)

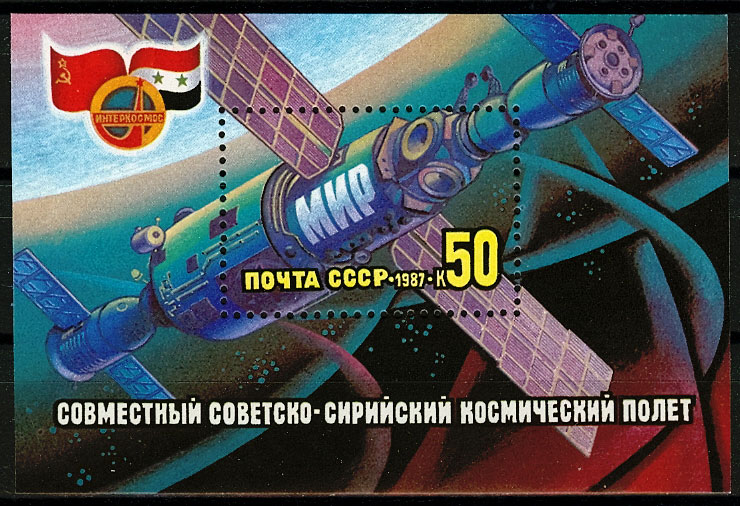
Joint Soviet-Syrian space flight 22–30 July 1987, as part of the Intercosmos project, USSR postage stamp, 1987

The Syrian coup d'état of February 1966 gave the Soviet Union the opportunity to further support Syria. A new coup d’état in 1970, called the Corrective Movement, brought Hafez al-Assad to power in Syria on 13 November 1970.

In 1971, under an agreement with President Hafez al-Assad, the Soviet Union was allowed to open its naval military base in Tartus, giving the Soviet Union a stable presence in the Middle East. Thousands of Syrian military officers and educated professionals studied in Russia during al-Assad's presidency (1971–2000).

During the Yom Kippur War, thousands of Soviet advisors and technicians assisted the Syrian army, and 20 are believed to have died. 3,750 tonnes of aid was airlifted during the war to Syria. At the end of October 1973, the Soviet Union sealifted 63,000 tonnes, mainly to Syria to replace its losses during the war.

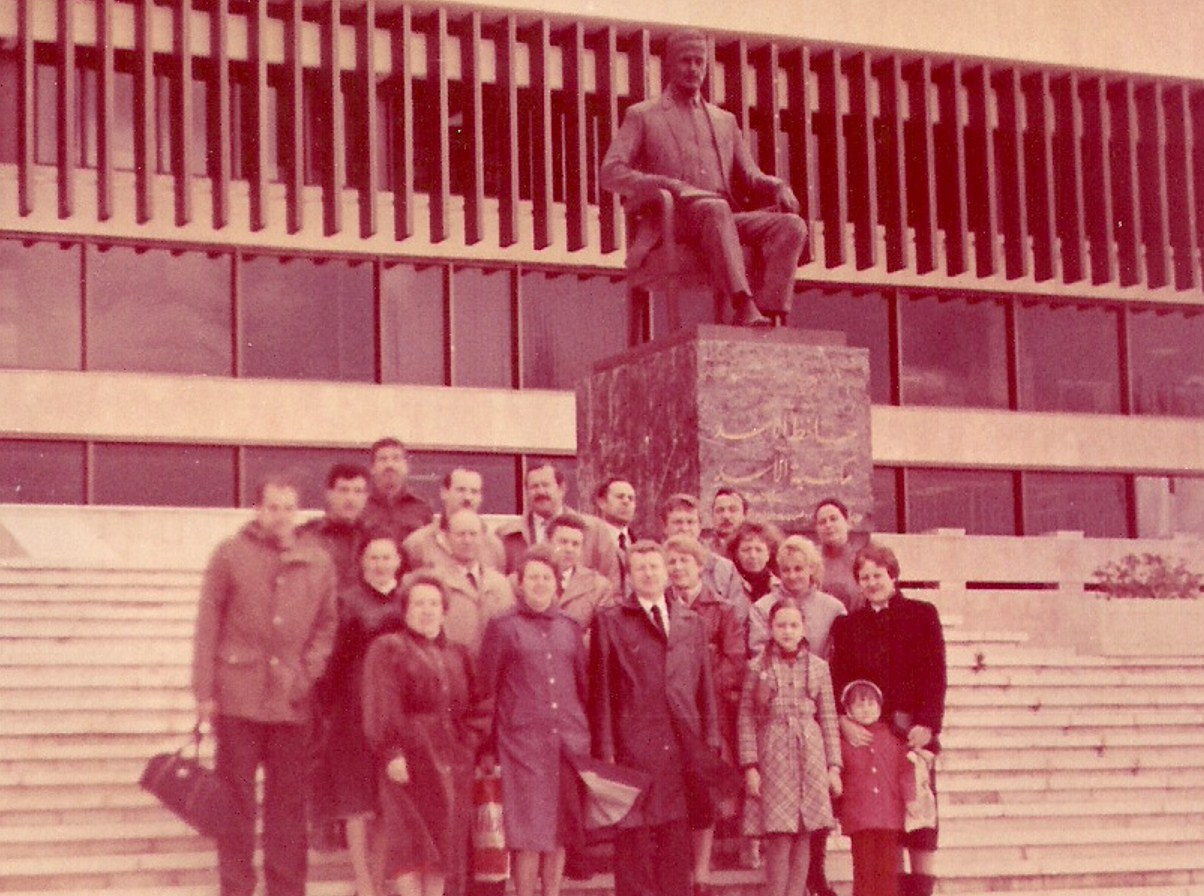
Soviet specialists with families in Damascus. Huge statue of Hafez al-Assad visible behind them

Nevertheless, relations with Syria became strained in 1976, as the Soviets were displeased by Assad's military involvement in Lebanon. A rift between the countries emerged, as the Soviets worried about a high risk of confrontation between the Palestinian Liberation Organization and the Assad regime, which were both Moscow clients. Indeed, the Soviet Union had promptly offered its resources both to Syria and to the PLO and did not approve the possibility of seeing two of its commercial partners confronting themselves on the ground, despite the existing hostility between Hafez al Assad and the PLO's leader Yasser Arafat. The Soviet leader Leonid Brezhnev's request for the retreat was accommodated not without agitation. Moscow had frozen weapons supplies, whereas Syria had denied Soviets the access to its naval bases. It took more than two years to see a thaw in Syrian-Soviet relations when the Arab country went through dire economic conditions and turned to Moscow for help. Again, Assad's main concern was represented by Israel. Indeed, the peace sought and achieved with Egypt posed the Jewish State to exercise more pressure on Syria. These conditions created solid grounds for further closeness to the Soviets.

In April 1977, Hafez al-Assad visited Moscow and met with Soviet leaders Leonid Brezhnev and Alexei Kosygin among others, as a sign of improved Syrian relations with the USSR. Relevantly, Assad distanced himself from the widespread Arab opinion denouncing the 1979 Soviet invasion of Afghanistan. On the contrary, he refused to condemn the act and tightened its relationship with Moscow. In October 1980, Syria and the Soviet Union signed a twenty-year Treaty of Friendship and Cooperation. Throughout the 1980s, till the end of Cold War, thousands of Soviet military personnel were present in Syria, and the bulk of Syrian weapons came from the USSR and its allies North Korea, East Germany, Hungary, Czechoslovakia and Poland.

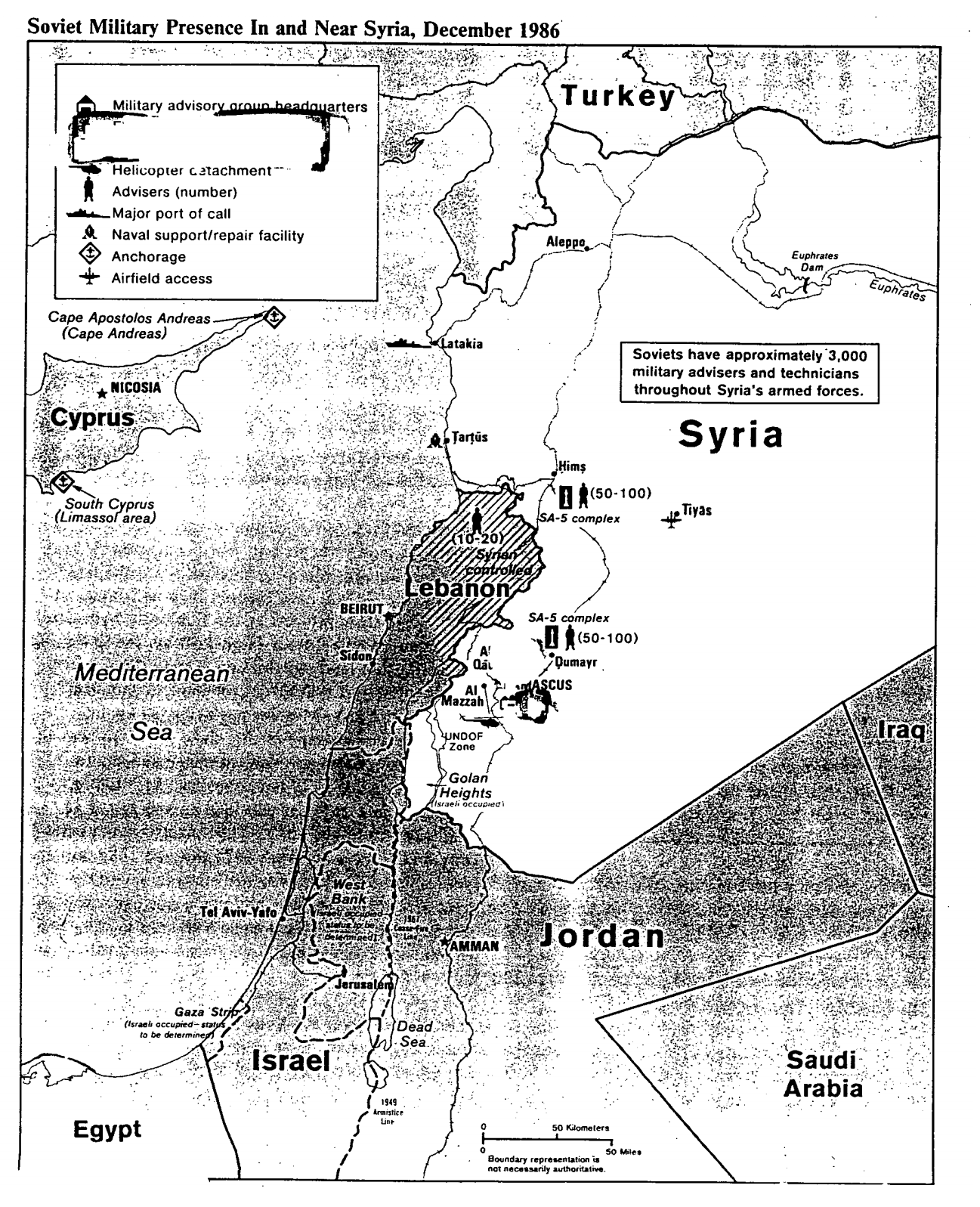
Soviet Military Presence in Syria and Lebanon, December 1986

Between 27 and 29 April 1987, Syrian President Hafez al-Assad, along with the Defense Minister Mustafa Tlass and Vice President Abdul Halim Khaddam, visited the Soviet Union, when he asked to acquire the S-300 missile system, but Mikhail Gorbachev refused to deliver, due to U.S. and Israeli rejection and Syrian accumulated debt from previous arms deals. On 6 July 1999, Assad visited Moscow to finalize an arms deal worth $2 billion.

Russia–Ba'athist Syria relations
- Russia: Syria

Diplomatic mission
- Embassy of Russia, Damascus: Embassy of Syria, Moscow

Syria recognized the newly formed Russian Federation on 26 December 1991 after the dissolution of the Soviet Union.

Hafez al-Assad died on 10 June 2000 and was succeeded on 10 July 2000 by his son Bashar al-Assad, who was elected President by referendum in which he ran unopposed, garnering 97.29% of the vote.

On 10 May 2010, Dmitry Medvedev became the first Russian president to visit Syria.

=== Syrian Civil War (2011–2024) ===
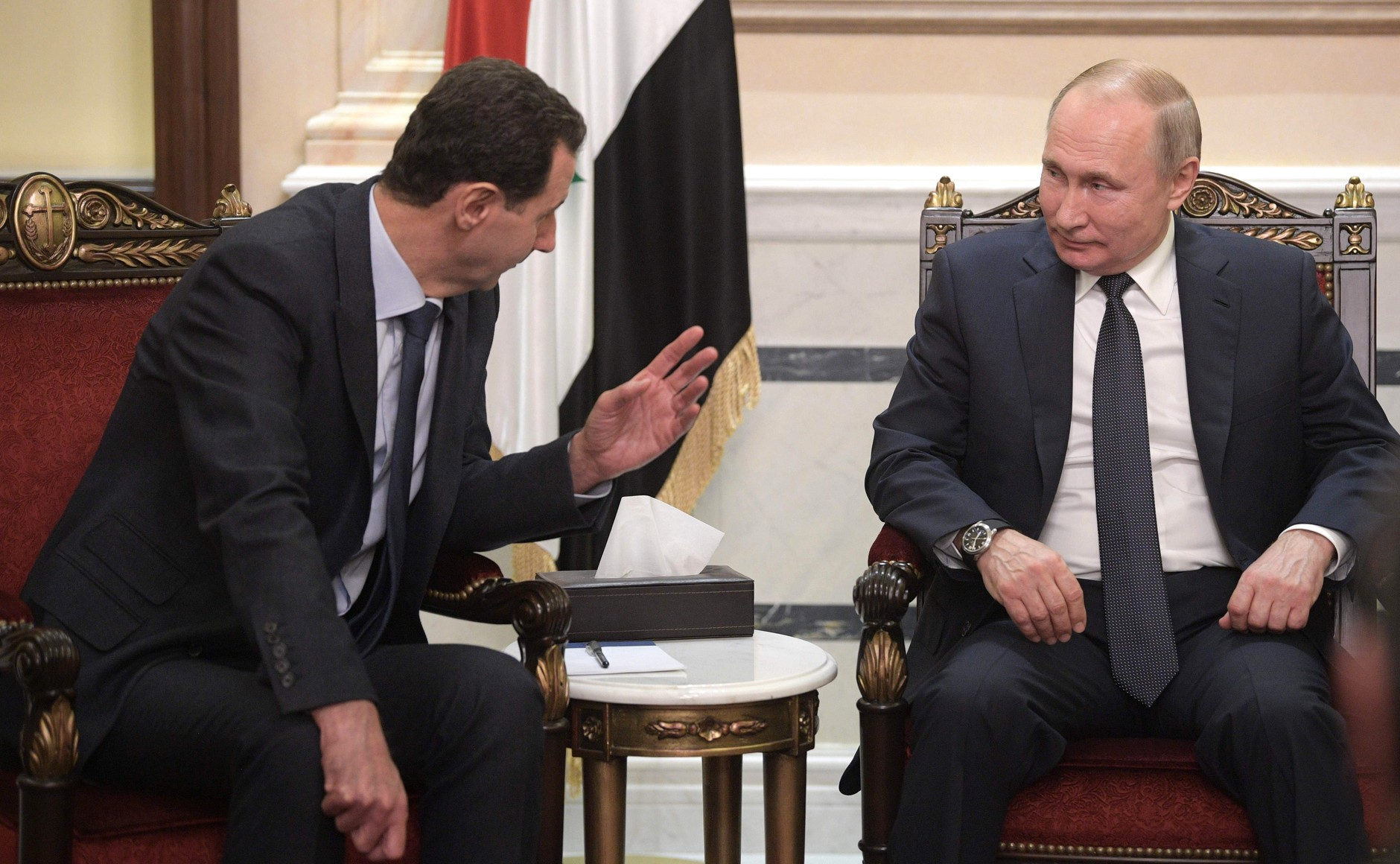
Assad and Putin in Damascus, 7 January 2020

During the Syrian civil war which began in 2011, Russia with China in February 2012 voted against a formal UN Security Council condemnation of the Bashar al-Assad government for alleged attacks on civilians in the city of Homs.

In September 2018, Russia announced free military education for Syrian children, with enrolment being on a competitive basis and candidates being chosen by Syria. The decision was implemented on 20 October 2018. The first batch of 8 Syrian children reached St. Petersburg in August.

On 30 November, 2024, a new rebel coalition, spearheaded by the militant group Hayat Tahrir al-Sham (HTS), carried out a surprise attack, across Syria over 11 days, sweeping through major cities on the way to conquer Syria and overthrowing Assad regime. This significant development faced minimal resistance from the Syrian army.

At first, the rebels took control of Syria's largest city Aleppo. The seismic move made Syrian and Russian jets struck rebel forces in Aleppo and Idlib, but opposition groups captured a second key city, Hama, and swiftly moved toward Homs, which serves as the gateway to the capital, Damascus. As Homs fell, rebels encircled and marched into Damascus.

=== Post-Assad regime relations ===
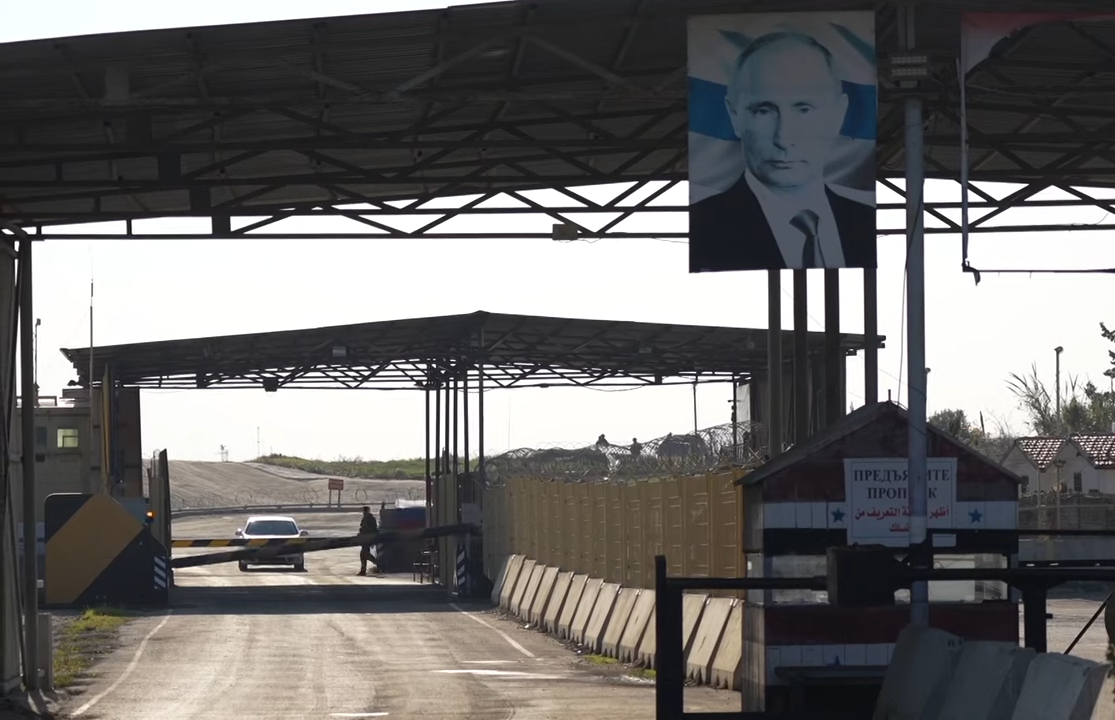
Entrance to the Khmeimim Air Base with Russian presence after Assad's fall. The image of Bashar al-Assad torn down by Russian soldiers, 18 December 2024

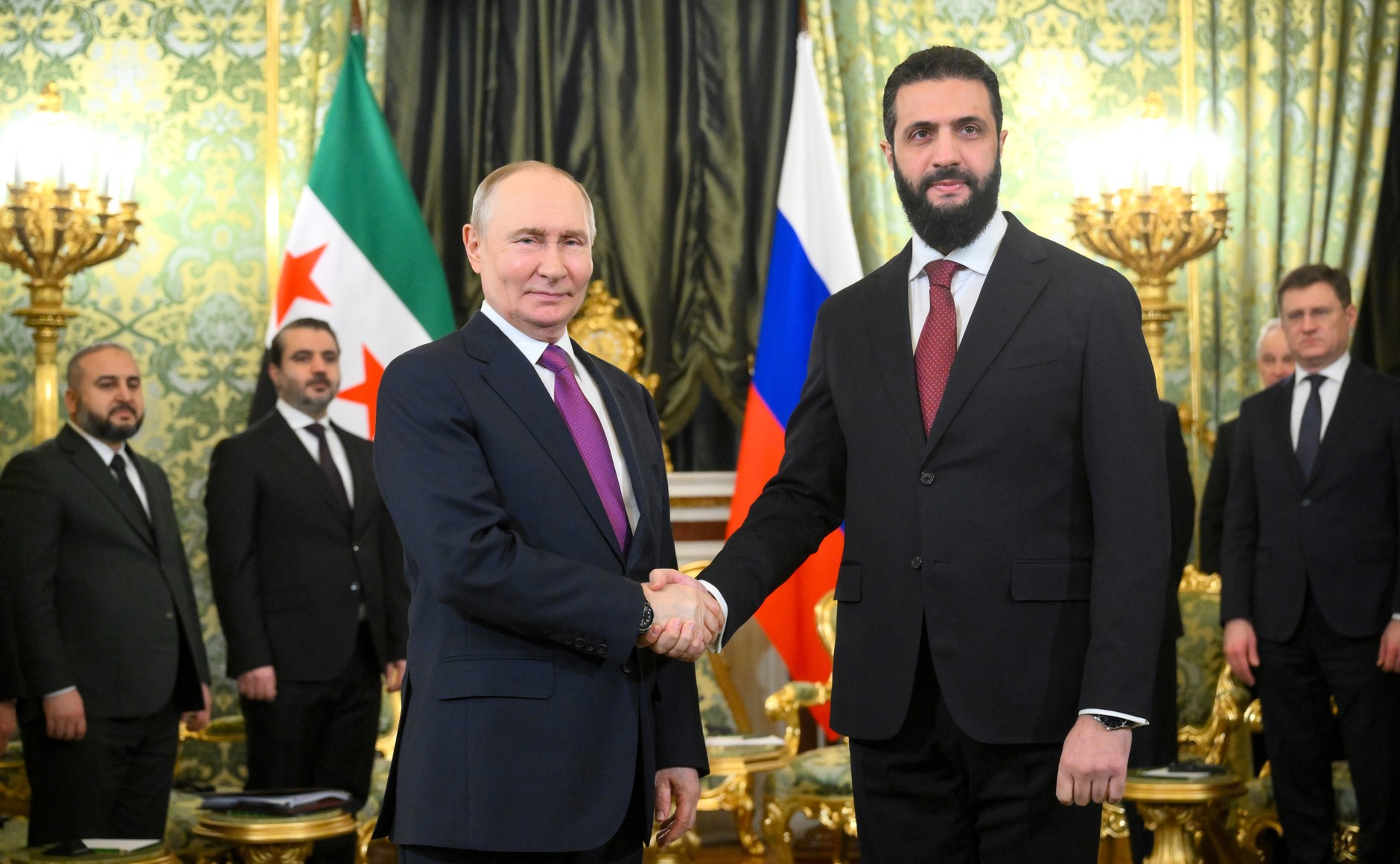
Syrian President Ahmed al-Sharaa with Vladimir Putin, 28 January 2026

On 8 December, Bashar al-Assad fled to Moscow and was granted political asylum by the Russian government. On 9 December, the Syrian embassy in Russia raised the new opposition flag. Although Russia began to pull out its troops stationed in Syria, much of the equipment was relocated to Libya while the future of the bases located in Syria were not under current discussion. On 29 December, HTS leader Ahmed al-Sharaa said Syria and Russia share strategic interests, and that "We do not want Russia to depart in a manner unbefitting its longstanding relationship with our country". He added that Syria's weapons were from Russia, and many power plants were managed by Russians, and that Syria did not want Russia to leave in the way that some wish.

On 28 January 2025, Syrian de facto leader Ahmed al-Sharaa told Syrian diplomats that Damascus sought the extradition of Syria's former president, Bashar-al Assad. On 29 January, a Russian delegation led by Deputy Foreign Minister Mikhail Bogdanov visited Damascus to meet Ahmed al-Sharaa, reaffirming Moscow's support for Syria's sovereignty and territorial integrity following the fall of the Assad regime. On 12 February, Syrian President al-Sharaa held a phone call with Russian president Vladimir Putin, in what was the latter's first contact with a Syrian head of state since Assad's overthrow.

In February 2025, former rebel forces now part of the ruling Hayat Tahrir al-Sham Islamist government, controlled access to Russia's Hmeimim Air Base and Tartous Naval Base. Syria’s new leadership seeks to renegotiate Russia’s long-term base leases for financial and diplomatic benefits. Kremlin spokesman Dmitry Peskov confirmed ongoing negotiations over Russian military bases in Syria. Russia remains reluctant to abandon its strategic Mediterranean foothold, while Syria demands financial concessions and the repatriation of funds allegedly deposited in Moscow by Assad’s regime.

In March 2025, diplomatic talks between Russian and Syrian officials revealed Syria’s intent to restructure its $20-23 billion foreign debt, much of it owed to Russia. Moscow is unlikely to forgive these loans but may offer humanitarian aid instead. Meanwhile, Assad’s fate remains uncertain, with Russia refusing extradition despite Syrian calls for accountability. Syrian Alawite civilians and their families fled to Russia’s Khmeimim Air Base to seek refuge during clashes in western Syria in March 2025.

Also in March 2025, Russian President Vladimir Putin expressed support for Syrian President Ahmed al-Sharaa, emphasizing Russia's commitment to Syria's sovereignty, independence, and territorial integrity. Putin offered practical cooperation on a range of issues to strengthen the historically friendly relations. Russia has continued to secure its key military bases in Syria, such as the Hmeimim airbase and the Tartous naval facility, despite withdrawing forces from some front-line positions in the north.

On 31 July 2025, Syrian Foreign Minister Asaad al-Shibani met Russian Foreign Minister Sergey Lavrov in Moscow. Al-Shibani stressed Syria's need for Russia's support in rebuilding and stabilizing the country. They agreed to strengthen cooperation in infrastructure, energy, and defense. Russia reaffirmed its commitment to Syria's sovereignty and pledged reconstruction aid. Later that year, on 15 October, President Ahmed al-Sharaa met President Vladimir Putin in Moscow, declaring Syria's intention to “redefine” its relations with Russia, and both sides agreed to contintue economic cooperation. Sharaa reaffirmed that Syria will uphold existing agreements and allow continued Russian control over Hmeimim airbase and Tartous naval base. Putin in turn praised Syria's recent elections but did not agree to extradite Assad back to Syria. On 28 January 2026, al-Sharaa met Putin in Moscow to discuss Russia's military presence in Syria. Putin reaffirmed Moscow's support for Syria's unity and territorial integrity, congratulated Damascus on recent political developments, and expressed hope that the return of the al-Jazira region would advance the full restoration of Syrian sovereignty. Both sides also emphasised continued economic and reconstruction cooperation.

On 9 August 2026, Syria and Russia reached a memorandum of understanding to reorganize Moscow's presence on the Syrian coast, including transferring civilian facilities to Syrian state management and converting Russian military bases into joint training centers.

== Military cooperation ==
=== Russian naval base in Tartus ===
The Russian naval facility in Tartus, Syria, was established during the Cold War under a 1971 agreement with Syria. It is Russia's only naval facility in the Mediterranean region and the only remaining military facility outside the former Soviet Union.

After Russia forgave Syria 73%, or $9.6 billion, of its $13.4 billion Soviet-era debt in 2005 and became its main arms supplier, Russia and Syria at the end of the 2000s conducted talks about allowing Russia to upgrade and expand the facility at Tartus. Amid Russia's deteriorating relations with the West, because of the 2008 South Ossetia War and plans to deploy a US missile defense shield in Poland, President Assad agreed to the port's conversion into a permanent Middle East base for Russia's nuclear-armed warships.

Since 2009, Russia has been renovating the Tartus naval base and dredging the port to allow access to its larger naval vessels.

On 18 January 2017, Russia and Syria signed an agreement, effective forthwith, whereunder Russia would be allowed to expand and use the naval facility at Tartus for 49 years on a free-of-charge basis and enjoy sovereign jurisdiction over the base. The treaty allows Russia to keep 11 warships at Tartus, including nuclear weapons; it stipulates privileges and full immunity from Syria's jurisdiction for Russia's personnel and materiel at the facility. The treaty was ratified and approved by Russian parliament, and the relevant federal law was signed by president Vladimir Putin by the end of December 2017.

=== Russian air base in Palmyra ===
Russia had in 2013 an airbase in Palmyra (Tadmur).

=== Russian air base at Latakia ===
In 2015 Russia established the Khmeimim Air Base at Latakia.

=== Secret Russian spy bases ===
The journal Jane's Defence Weekly in 2006 assumed two secret, joint, Russian–Syrian signals intelligence ‘spy’ posts to exist within Syria. The biggest Russian electronic ‘eavesdropping post’ outside Russian territory was in 2012 established in Latakia.

Another signals intelligence base, "Center S" ("Центр С" in Cyrillic script), jointly operated by the Russian OSNAZ GRU radio electronic intelligence agency and a Syrian intelligence agency, situated near Al-Harra in Syria close to the Israeli-occupied Golan Heights, was on 5 October 2014 captured by Free Syrian Army rebels during the 2014 Daraa offensive before it was recaptured by SAA during 2018 Southern Syria offensive.

=== Syria's air defence with Russian equipment ===
After the 2007 Israeli Operation Orchard airstrikes on an alleged nuclear reactor at al-Kibar in Deir ez-Zor Governorate, and again after the March 2011 Syrian protests, Syria's air defences have been bolstered with Russian upgrades—which the Russians have repeatedly denied. According to Western experts, the Russians delivered Buk-M2 and Pantsir-S1 (also known as SA-22) mobile missile launch and radar systems. While the Syrians were not capable of using such equipment to its full capacity, the Russians also helped man the crews and train the crews. As of late 2012, Syria's air-defence command force comprised thousands of anti-aircraft guns, 130 anti-aircraft missile batteries, and an estimated 50,000 troops, and was qualified by The Guardian as "robust".

=== 2015 Russian military intervention ===
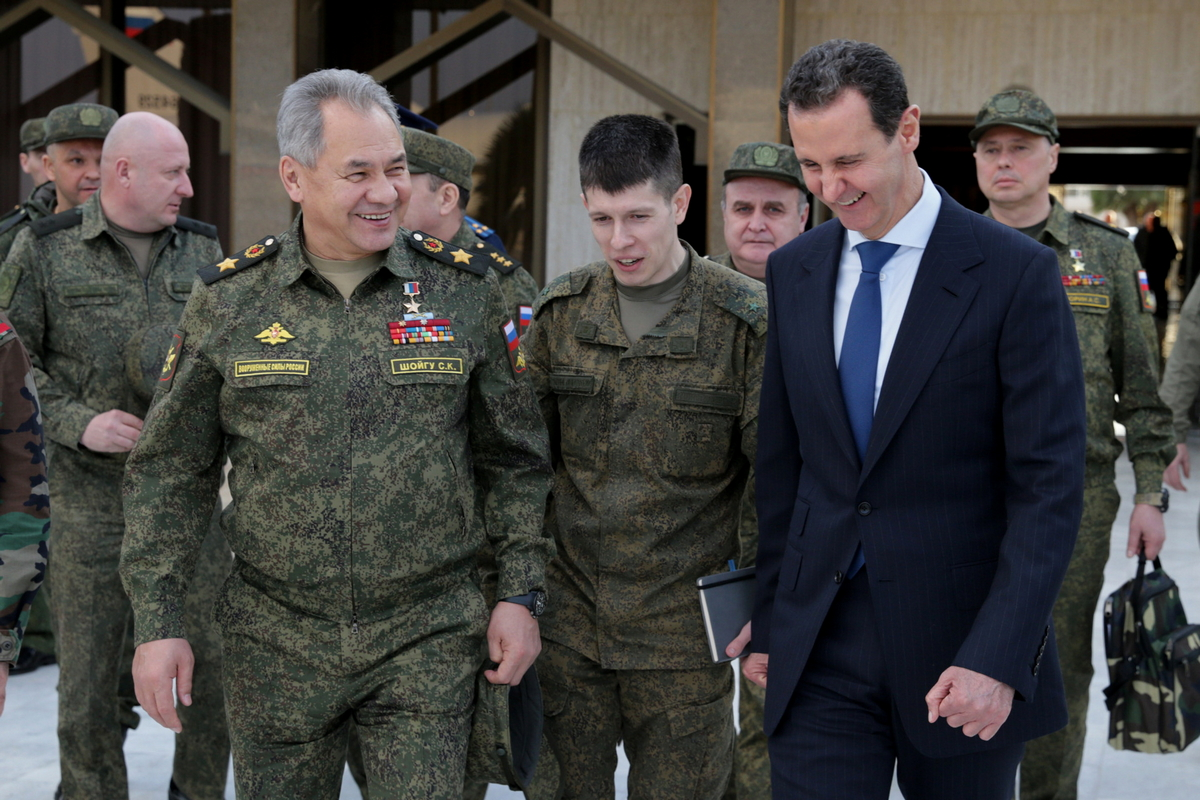
Assad with Russian defence minister Sergei Shoigu, February 2022

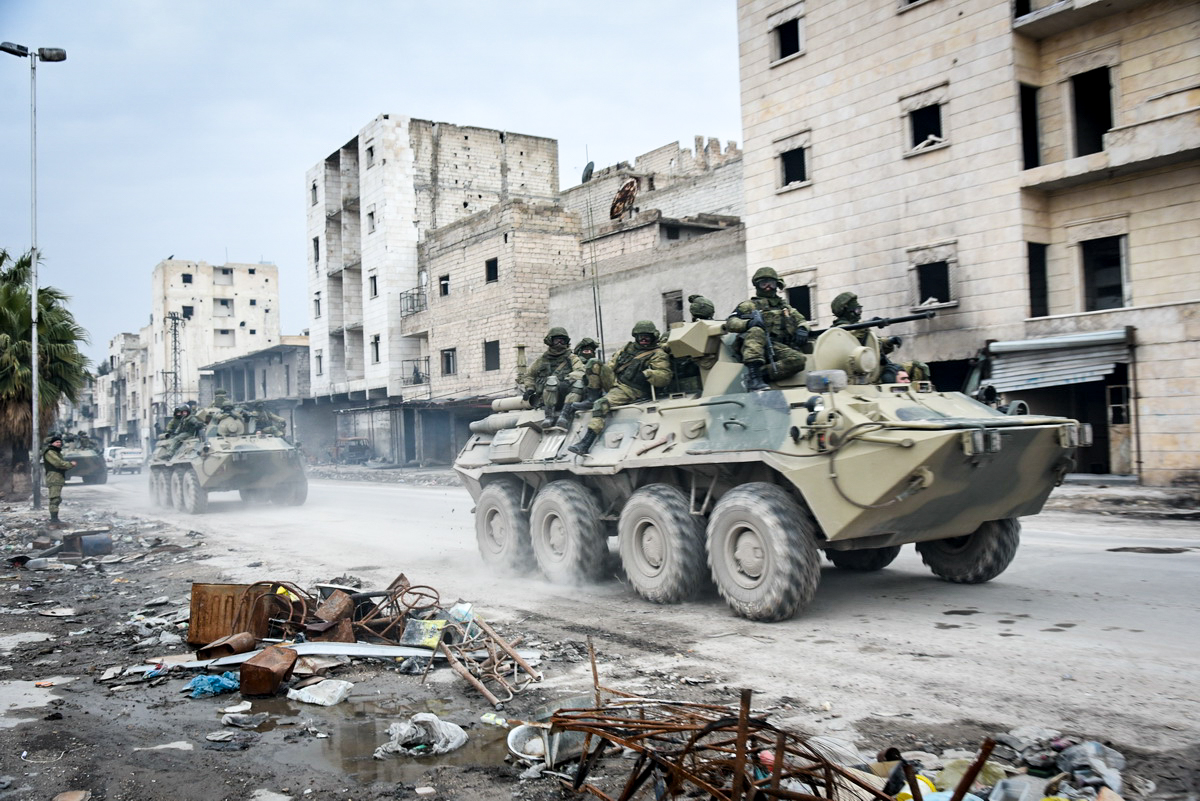
Russian sappers in Aleppo during the Syrian civil war, December 2016

On 30 September 2015, Russia began a military intervention in the Syrian Civil War in support of Bashar al-Assad's government, consisting of air strikes against Syrians who opposed the government. In addition, ISIS and Assad's forces fought against opposition groups (FSA). With Vladimir Putin's support, Assad's troops were fighting the Free Syrian Army throughout the country. Expressing Russian, Iranian, and Syrian support for each other, the Chairman of the Iranian parliament's, (aka Islamic Consultative Assembly or Majlis) National Security and Foreign Policy Committee – Heshmat-Allah Falahat Pishe – stated during an interview on Russia Today TV on 1 February 2019: "Russian, Iranian, and Syrian soldiers shed their blood together in Syria. ... I do now know why the Russians hesitate to say that our relationship is strategic. We have fought together and Russia is under American sanctions, just like us. In order to deal with that, we expect more cooperation from the Russian side."

In May 2019, The Moscow Times reported that "Fifty-five percent of Russian respondents say their country should end its military campaign in Syria, up from 49 percent in August 2017, according to a poll published by Levada".

During the Northwestern Syrian offensive in 2024, the Russian Air Force conducted airstrikes in support of Assad's regime, bombing civilian targets in the Idlib and Hama regions, specifically urban neighbourhoods and refugee camps, including Morek, Khan Sheikhoun, Kafranbel, Hazarin, and Tal Kawkabah. At least 50 people are reported to have been killed by the airstrikes. After a phone conversation between Iranian and Russian presidents, the Kremlin released a statement that "Unconditional support was expressed for the actions of the legitimate authorities of Syria to restore constitutional order and the territorial integrity of the country".

=== Russian invasion of Ukraine ===
In May 2022, The Guardian reported that 50 Syrian specialists skilled in making and delivering barrel bombs have been in Russia for several weeks working alongside officials from the Russian military to help potentially deliver a bombing campaign similar to the Syrian barrel bomb campaign.

=== Joint military exercises ===
Syria and Russia regularly conduct joint military drills. In February 2022, the two countries conducted drills a week before Russia began its invasion of Ukraine. In June 2022, the Syrian and Russian air forces conducted drills over different parts of the country including the edge of the Golan Heights. In October 2022, Syrian state media reported that Syrian and Russian troops had conducted military drills simulating attacking enemy positions.

=== Intervention in the Northwestern Syrian offensive ===
In December 2024, during the Northwestern Syrian offensive in 2024, the Russian Air Force conducted airstrikes in support of Assad's regime, bombing civilian targets in the Idlib and Hama regions, specifically urban neighbourhoods and refugee camps, including Morek, Khan Shaykhun, Kafr Nabl, Hazarin, and Tal Kawkabah. At least 50 people are reported to have been killed by the airstrikes. After a phone conversation between Iranian and Russian presidents, the Kremlin released a statement that "Unconditional support was expressed for the actions of the legitimate authorities of Syria to restore constitutional order and the territorial integrity of the country".

== Economic relations ==
Russia has significant economic interests in Syria. Its investments in the country were valued at $19.4 billion in 2009, according to "The Moscow Times", and its exports to Syria were worth $1.1 billion in 2010.

=== Arms sales ===
The Soviet Union's military sales to Syria in the 1970s and 80s accounted for 90% of all Syrian military arms imports, according to a United States Congressional Research Service Report released in 2008. The report noted that Syria purchased several billions of dollars' worth of military equipment from the Soviets, including SS-21 "Scarab" short-range missiles (range 70 km).

After the collapse of the Soviet Union in 1991, Syria found itself deprived of arms imports but continued to seek them through former Soviet satellite states. The establishment of the Russian Federation in 1992 saw the re-introduction of the patron-vendor relationship and the cancellation of almost 73% of Syria's debt. According to reports, 2.4% of Russia's total exports come from defense-related sales.

From 2000 to 2010, Russia sold around $1.5 billion worth of arms to Syria, making Damascus Moscow's seventh-largest client, according to Dmitri Trenin in the New York Times.

In 2008, Syria agreed to purchase modern weapons including modern anti-tank and anti-air missile systems from Russia, including MiG-29SMT fighters, Pantsir S1E air-defense systems, Iskander tactical missile systems, Yak-130 aircraft, and two Amur-1650 submarines. Russia's foreign minister Sergei Lavrov said his country's sale of weapons to Syria would not upset the balance of power in the Middle East. The sales he stated are "in line with the international law" and "in the interests of strengthening stability and maintaining security" in regions close to Russian borders, Lavrov told reporters.

During the 2011 Syrian uprising Russia allegedly shipped arms to Assad's government for use against rebels.

Syria's arms contracts with Russia in 2011 and 2012 amounted to $687 million, according to the Stockholm International Peace Research Institute (SIPRI). But according to The Moscow Times, Russia and Syria had in 2011 well over $4 billion in active arms contracts.

=== Other economic sectors ===
Russian firms in 2011 had a substantial presence in Syria's infrastructure, energy, and tourism industries. Stroitransgaz, a natural gas facility construction company, has the largest Russian operation in Syria. In 2010, it was involved in projects worth $1.1 billion and had a staff of 80 Russians working in Syria. Stroitransgaz is building a natural gas processing plant 200 kilometers east of Homs in the Raqqa region and is involved in technical support for the construction of the Arab Gas Pipeline. Tatneft is the most significant Russian energy firm in Syria. The company began in 2010 through a joint venture with the Syrian national oil company to pump Syrian oil and it planned to spend $12 million on exploratory wells near the Iraqi border. Other firms with large business interests in Syria include steel pipe manufacturer TMK, gas producer ITERA, and national carrier Aeroflot.

=== Trade relations ===
In 2025, Russia increasingly supported Syria’s economy, such as through printing the Syrian pound under a multi-million dollar contract following European sanctions on Syria.

On 14 February 2025, it was reported that the new Syrian government through the Syrian Central Bank received a massive amount of Syrian pounds from the Russian government via Damascus International Airport.

On 6 March 2025, it was reported that Russia shipped Syrian pounds in cash to Syria via Damascus International Airport.

== See also ==
- Foreign relations of Russia
- Foreign relations of Syria
- Embassy of Russia, Damascus
- Embassy of Syria, Moscow
- Ambassadors of Russia to Syria
- Syria–Russia memorandum on military bases
