= Embassy of Syria, Moscow =

Diplomatic mission of Syria in Russia

Embassy of the Syrian Arab Republic in Moscow سفارة الجمهورية العربية السورية في موسكو Посольство Сирийской Арабской Республики в Москве
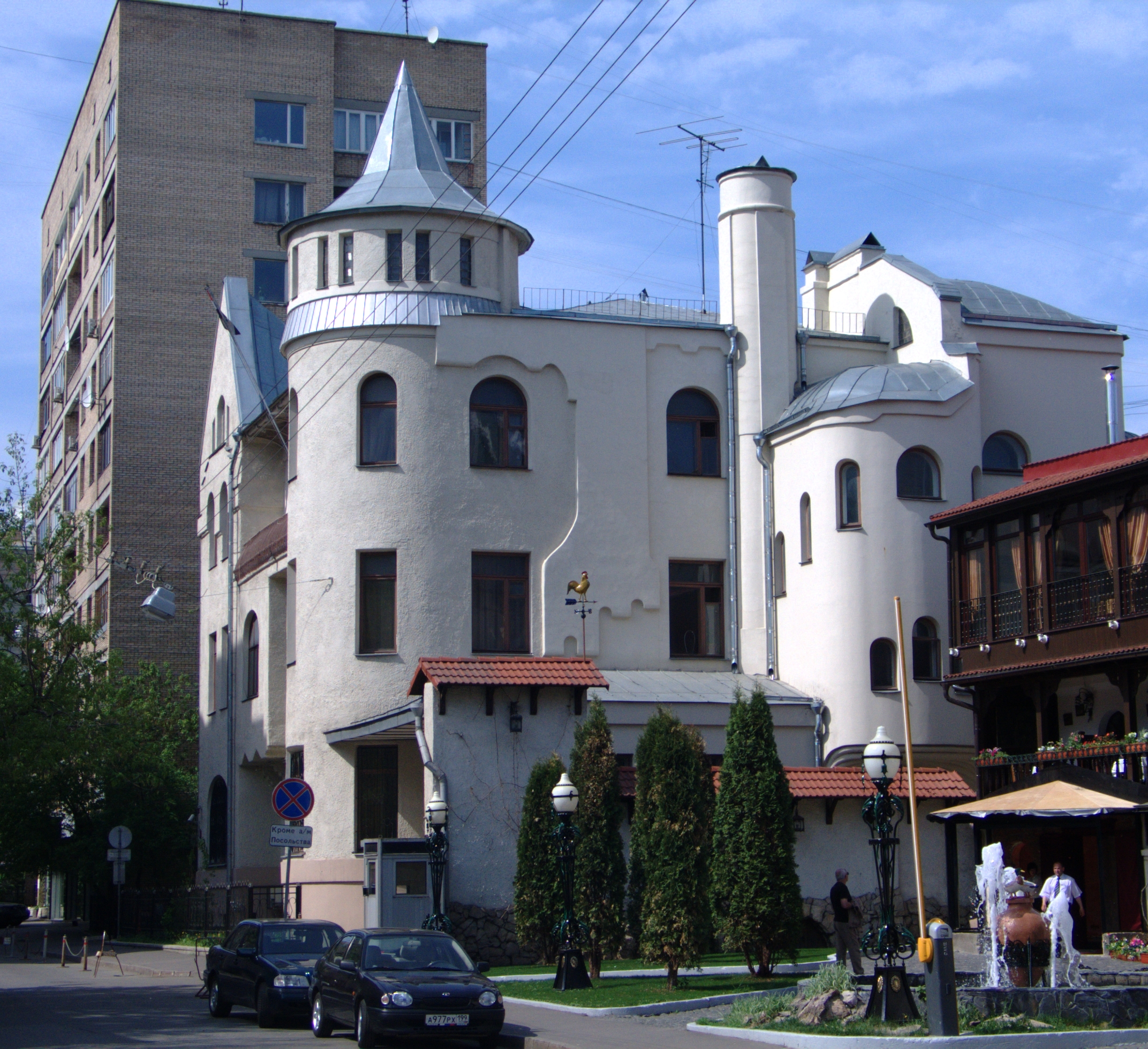
- Location: Moscow
- Address: 4 Mansurovsky Lane, (Russian: Мансуровский пер., 4)
- Coordinates: 55°44′23″N 37°35′43″E
- Ambassador: Chargé d'affaires

The Embassy of Syria in Moscow (Arabic: سفارة الجمهورية العربية السورية في موسكو) is the diplomatic mission of the Syrian Arab Republic to the Russian Federation. The chancery is located at 4 Mansurovsky Lane (Russian: Мансуровский пер., 4) in the Khamovniki District of Moscow.

Diplomatic relations between the Soviet Union and Syria were established in July 1944. On 8 October 1980, Syria and the Soviet Union signed a Treaty of Friendship and Cooperation.

The treaty runs for twenty years and has automatic five-year extensions, unless one of the parties terminates the agreement. It provides for regular consultations on bilateral and multilateral issues of interest, coordination of responses in the event of a crisis, and military cooperation. The treaty remains in force to this day. In January 1992, the Syrian government recognized the Russian Federation as the legal successor to the Soviet Union.

On 9 December 2024, after the Syrian opposition overthrew the Assad regime, the Syrian embassy in Russia raised the new flag of Syria.

== Building ==
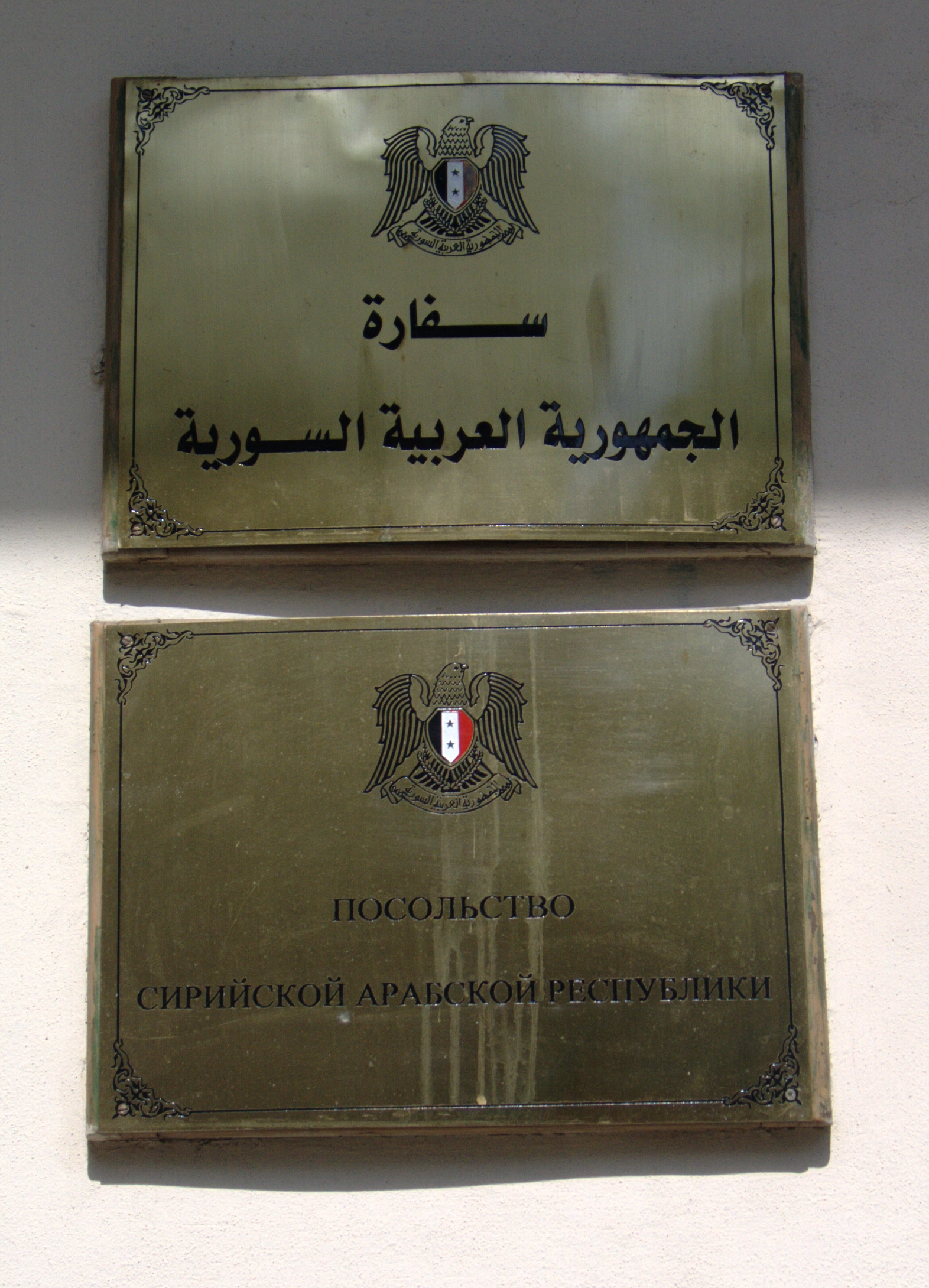
A plate on the Embassy of Syria in Moscow during the Assad regime

The present embassy building was designed by the Russian architect Alexander Zelenko in 1910, and became the High Commission of Syria from the end of 1945. The building became the official Syrian Embassy in Moscow in February 1946, though Syrian declaration of independence took place on 17 April 1946, after the departure of the last French troops from Syria.

== Ambassadors of Syria to Russia ==
- Gassan Raslan (1994–2000)
- Wahib Ben Mohammed Hussain Fadel (2000–2005)
- Hasan Riche (2006–2009)
- Riad Haddad (2011–2022)
- Bashar Jaafari (2022–2024)

== See also ==
- Russia–Syria relations
- Embassy of Russia in Damascus
- Diplomatic missions in Russia
