= Solod =

Solod is a surname. Notable people with the surname include:

- Daniel Solod (1908–1988), Soviet diplomat
- Yuriy Solod (born 1972), Ukrainian businessman and politician
