= List of ambassadors of Russia to Sierra Leone =

Ambassador of the Russian Federation to the Republic of Sierra Leone
- Emblem of the Russian Foreign Ministry
- Incumbent; Andrey Stolyarov since 21 October 2025
- Ministry of Foreign Affairs; Embassy of Russia in Freetown
- Style: His Excellency; The Honourable
- Reports to: Minister of Foreign Affairs
- Seat: Freetown
- Appointer: President of Russia
- Term length: At the pleasure of the president
- Website: Embassy of Russia in Sierra Leone

The ambassador of Russia to Sierra Leone is the official representative of the president and the government of the Russian Federation to the president and the government of Sierra Leone.

The ambassador and his staff work at large in the Russian embassy in Freetown. The current Russian ambassador to Sierra Leone is Andrey Stolyarov, incumbent since 21 October 2025.

== History of diplomatic relations ==
Diplomatic relations between the Soviet Union and Sierra Leone were established on 18 January 1962, shortly after the country's independence from the United Kingdom. The first ambassador, Grigory Pashchenko, was appointed on 18 December 1962, and the embassy in Freetown was opened in 1963. With the dissolution of the Soviet Union in 1991, Sierra Leone recognised the Russian Federation as its successor state on 7 December 1991. The Russian embassy in Sierra Leone was closed in September 1992, and since 2 November 1992, the Russian ambassador to Guinea had dual accreditation to Sierra Leone. This practice continued until 21 October 2025, when Andrey Stolyarov was appointed the first ambassador solely accredited to Sierra Leone since 1992.

== List of representatives of Russia to Sierra Leone (1962–present) ==
=== Ambassadors of the Soviet Union to Sierra Leone (1962–1991) ===
Name	Title	Appointment	Termination	Notes
Grigory Pashchenko	Ambassador	18 December 1962	26 November 1966	Credentials presented on 6 February 1963
Aleksandr Aleksandrov	Ambassador	26 November 1966	17 September 1970	Credentials presented on 18 January 1967
Ivan Fillipov	Ambassador	17 September 1970	27 August 1979	Credentials presented on 23 October 1970
Aleksandr Vorozhtsov	Ambassador	27 August 1979	10 January 1984	Credentials presented on 17 December 1979
Yury Meshkov	Ambassador	10 January 1984	4 October 1986	Credentials presented on 15 March 1984
Vladimir Novoseltsev	Ambassador	4 October 1986	30 October 1990	
Vladislovas Mikuchyauskas	Ambassador	30 October 1990	25 December 1991	

=== Ambassadors of the Russian Federation to Sierra Leone (1991–present) ===
Name	Title	Appointment	Termination	Notes
Vladislovas Mikuchyauskas	Ambassador	25 December 1991	2 March 1992	
Igor Studennikov	Ambassador	2 March 1992	27 August 1998	Concurrently ambassador to Guinea
Igor Ivashchenko	Ambassador	27 August 1998	25 March 2004	Concurrently ambassador to Guinea
Dmitry Malyev	Ambassador	13 July 2004	27 January 2011	Concurrently ambassador to Guinea
Aleksandr Bregadze	Ambassador	27 January 2011	4 March 2019	Concurrently ambassador to Guinea; Credentials presented on 26 August 2011
Vadim Razumovsky	Ambassador	4 March 2019	23 June 2023	Concurrently ambassador to Guinea; Credentials presented on 18 September 2019
Aleksey Popov	Ambassador	23 June 2023	21 October 2025	Concurrently ambassador to Guinea; Credentials presented on 8 February 2024
Andrey Stolyarov	Ambassador	21 October 2025		
