= List of ambassadors of Russia to Lebanon =

Ambassador of the Russian Federation to the Republic of Lebanon
- Emblem of the Russian Foreign Ministry
- Incumbent; Aleksandr Rudakov since 14 August 2020
- Ministry of Foreign Affairs; Embassy of Russia in Beirut
- Style: His Excellency; The Honourable
- Reports to: Minister of Foreign Affairs
- Seat: Beirut
- Appointer: President of Russia
- Term length: At the pleasure of the president
- Website: Embassy of Russia in Lebanon

The ambassador of Russia to Lebanon is the official representative of the president and the government of the Russian Federation to the president and the government of Lebanon.

The ambassador and his staff work at large in the Russian embassy in Beirut. The current Russian ambassador to Lebanon is Aleksandr Rudakov, incumbent since 14 August 2020.

== History of diplomatic relations ==
Diplomatic relations between the Soviet Union and Lebanon were established in 1943, shortly after the country's independence from France, and with the Soviet Union becoming one of the first countries to recognise an independent Lebanon. Diplomatic relations were initially handled through the Soviet mission in Syria, with the Soviet envoy to Syria, Daniel Solod, given dual accreditation to Lebanon from 14 September 1944. This practice continued until 2 September 1953, when a new envoy, Sergei Nemchina was appointed to represent the USSR in Syria, leaving the former envoy, Vasily Belyaev, as solely accredited to Lebanon. The mission was upgraded to an embassy on 29 June 1956, and since 16 August 1956, representatives have the title of ambassador. With the dissolution of the Soviet Union in 1991, Lebanon recognised the Russian Federation as its successor state on 30 December 1991, and the incumbent Soviet ambassador, Gennady Ilichyov, continued as the Russian ambassador until 1996.

== List of representatives of Russia to Lebanon (1944–present) ==
=== Ambassadors of the Soviet Union to Lebanon (1944–1991) ===
Name	Title	Appointment	Termination	Notes
Daniel Solod	Envoy	14 September 1944	22 April 1950	Credentials presented on 30 October 1944; Concurrently Soviet envoy to Syria
Ilya Tavadze	Envoy	22 April 1950	24 November 1950	Concurrently Soviet envoy to Syria
Vasily Belyaev	Envoy	24 November 1950	17 December 1955	Credentials presented on 15 March 1951; Concurrently Soviet envoy to Syria until 2 September 1953
Sergey Kiktev	Envoy until 16 August 1956; Ambassador after 16 August 1956	17 December 1955	10 July 1961	Credentials presented on 22 August 1956
Vasily Kornev	Ambassador	10 July 1961	9 October 1962	Credentials presented on 15 September 1961
Dmitry Nikiforov	Ambassador	9 October 1962	6 May 1966	Credentials presented on 7 December 1962
Pyotr Dedushkin	Ambassador	6 May 1966	20 May 1969	Credentials presented on 16 August 1966
Sarvar Azimov	Ambassador	20 May 1969	17 October 1974	Credentials presented on 13 June 1969
Aleksandr Soldatov	Ambassador	17 October 1974	22 April 1986	Credentials presented on 5 November 1974
Vasily Kolotusha	Ambassador	22 April 1986	14 September 1990	
Gennady Ilichyov	Ambassador	14 September 1990	25 December 1991	

=== Ambassadors of the Russian Federation to Lebanon (1991–present) ===
Name	Title	Appointment	Termination	Notes
Gennady Ilichyov	Ambassador	25 December 1991	29 January 1996	
Oleg Peresypkin	Ambassador	29 January 1996	29 October 1999	Credentials presented in February 1996
Boris Bolotin	Ambassador	29 October 1999	7 May 2004	
Sergey Bukin	Ambassador	7 May 2004	1 October 2010	
Aleksandr Zasypkin	Ambassador	1 October 2010	14 August 2020	
Aleksandr Rudakov	Ambassador	14 August 2020		
