= List of ambassadors of Russia to Croatia =

Ambassador of the Russian Federation to the Republic of Croatia
- Emblem of the Russian Foreign Ministry
- Incumbent; Aleksandr Nurizade since 7 May 2024
- Ministry of Foreign Affairs; Embassy of Russia in Zagreb
- Style: His Excellency
- Reports to: Minister of Foreign Affairs
- Seat: Zagreb
- Appointer: President of Russia
- Term length: At the pleasure of the president
- Website: Embassy of Russia in Croatia

The ambassador extraordinary and plenipotentiary of the Russian Federation to the Republic of Croatia is the official representative of the president and the government of the Russian Federation to the president and the government of Croatia.

The ambassador and his staff work at large in the Embassy of Russia in Zagreb. The post of Russian ambassador to Croatia is currently held by Aleksandr Nurizade, incumbent since 7 May 2024.

== History of diplomatic relations ==
Following the independence of Croatia in October 1991, and the dissolution of the Soviet Union in December 1991, the Russian Federation recognized the independence of the Republic of Croatia on 17 February 1992. Diplomatic relations between the two countries were first established on 25 May 1992, and embassies were established in the two capitals in autumn that year.

== Representatives of the Russian Federation to the Republic of Croatia (1992–present) ==
Name	Title	Appointment	Termination	Notes
Leonid Kerestedzhiyants	Ambassador	8 September 1992	15 November 1996	
Mecheslav Senkevich	Ambassador	23 January 1997	14 October 1998	
Eduard Kuzmin	Ambassador	2 March 1999	17 February 2004	
Mikhail Konarovsky	Ambassador	17 February 2004	23 July 2009	
Robert Markaryan	Ambassador	23 July 2009	30 June 2015	
Anvar Azimov	Ambassador	30 June 2015	21 August 2020	
Andrey Nestorenko	Ambassador	21 August 2020	7 May 2024	
Aleksandr Nurizade	Ambassador	7 May 2024		
