= Alexander Zelenko =

Russian architect (1871–1953)

Alexander Ustinovich Zelenko
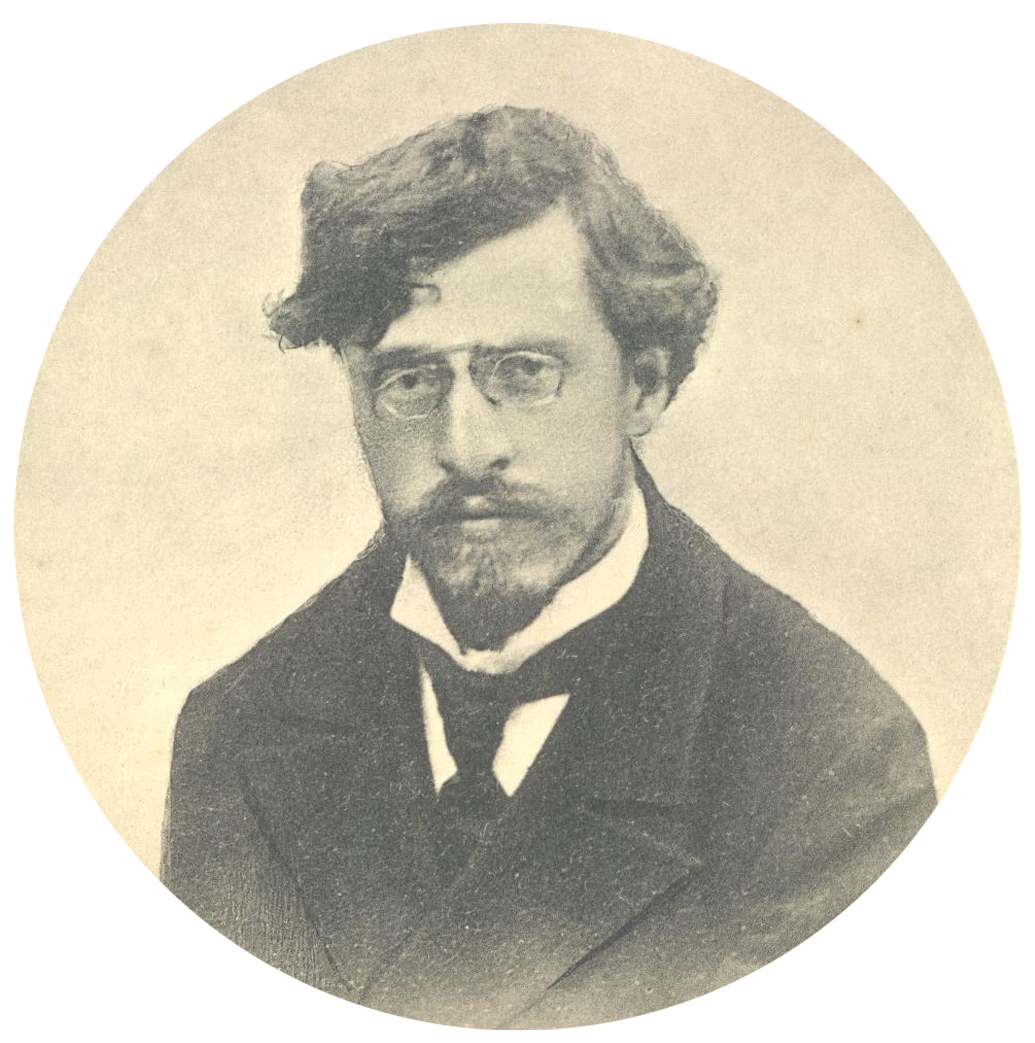
- Born: October 11, 1871; Saint Petersburg
- Died: July 21, 1953 (aged 81); Moscow
- Occupation: Architect
- Practice: Own practice
- Buildings: Art Nouveau mansions in Samara, 1899-1903; Communal Club for working children in Moscow, 1907

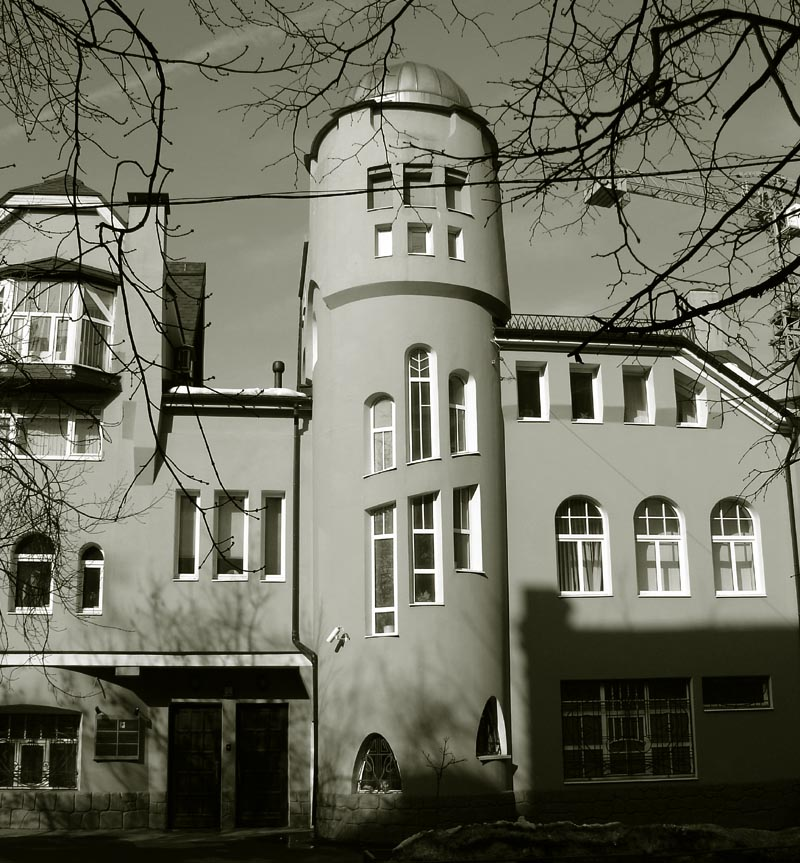
Communal Club for working children in Vadkovsky Lane, Moscow, 1907

Alexander Ustinovich Zelenko (Russian: Александр Устинович Зеленко; 1871–1953), was a Russian and Soviet architect and educator, a pioneer in settlement movement and vocational education. Originally a practitioner of provincial Art Nouveau in Samara and Moscow, he later joined the camp of rationalists and focused on perfecting school and museum designs.

== Biography ==
Alexander Zelenko grew up in a family of Saint Petersburg Medical Academy professor. He trained first in Cadet Corps, graduated from Saint Petersburg Civil Engineers Institute in 1892, trained in Vienna and in Fyodor Shekhtel's firm in Moscow.

Zelenko relocated to Samara, bringing Art Nouveau to this Volga town. For a while, he enjoyed steady flow of commissions and the title of Town Architect (1899-1900). Later, he taught in graphic arts in Moscow, travelled to United States in 1903-1904; in this period, Zelenko switched from architectural practice to education.

In 1905 Zelenko joined educators Stanislav Shatsky and Louise Shleger on their Summer Labor Commune project in Shchyolkovo, then on Russia's first club for the children. Next year, they set up state-funded Settlement Society for training and professional education. Funded by industrialist Nikolay Krotov, Zelenko designed and built extant Communal Club for the Children in Moscow (completed 1907, Vadkovsky Lane, 5). The castle-like expressionist structure, designed as "inhabitable sculpture", is sometimes compared to Gaudi and Hundertwasser. This club looked after the working teenagers of Moscow's blue-collar North End, and was part of a larger effort to create a new social and educational center in then remote part of Tverskoy and Meshchansky Districts.

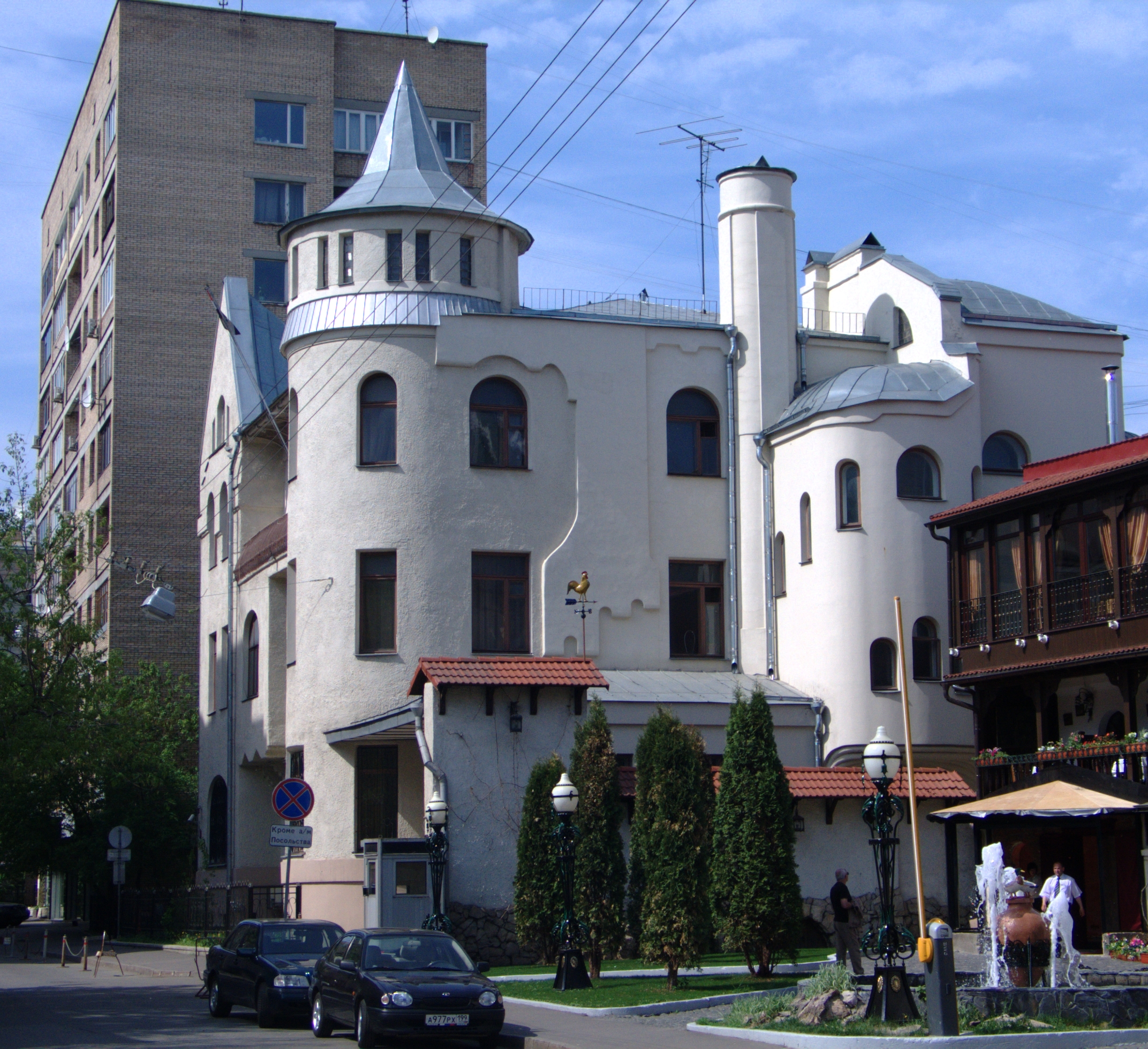
Another Moscow building by Zelenko, in Mansurovsky Lane, houses the Embassy of Syria

Settlement was organized in separate boys and girls groups of 12. Each group selected their training schedule, and shaped its own code of conduct. Vadkovsky lane house integrated Settlement program with traditional kindergarten for working families and a two-year junior school. The arts and crafts courses, licensed to "A.U.Zelenko, Architect", catered to around 200 children. Although Zelenko abstained from active politics, police disbanded Settlement on May 1, 1908; Zelenko was jailed for a few months and had to flee to United States again. Upon his return in 1910, he again worked with Shatsky, lectured at the Shanyavsky University and continued architectural practice. Before World War I, he completed highly publicized Pfeffer House in Sokolniki, Kindergarten in Khamovniki medical campus and other buildings.

After the Russian Revolution of 1917, and until his death in 1953, Zelenko worked in various Soviet educational institutions, notably in setting architectural standards for schools and kindergartens. Zelenko collaborated in the Museum Commission (1919–1931), designing exhibitions for children (1925–1929) and promoting Alfred Lichtwark's Museumpaedagogic concept. Zelenko, then in his sixties, also collaborated with Nikolai Ladovsky on his Linear city urban concept.

== Buildings ==
- 1900 Reshetov House, Samara, Kuibyshevskaya, 48
- 1903 Kurlin House, Samara, Frunze, 159 (, currently Art Nouveau Museum)
- 1900s Permyakov House, Samara, Molodogvardeyskaya 70
- 1900s Own House, Samara, Samarskaya 179
- 1905 Commercial College, Samara, corner of Molodogvarseyskaya and Ulyanovskaya
- 1905 Interiors - Tsesarevich Alexei Commercial College, Moscow, Stremyanny Lane, 28 (now Plekhanov Russian Economic University)
- 1900s Settlement schools in Saratov region
- 1900s Moscow, Tverskoy Boulevard, 6 (rebuilt, lost all original exterior)
- 1907 Communal club for the working children, Moscow, Vadkovsky Lane
- 1910 Pfeffer House, Sokolniki, Moscow (destroyed)
- 1910 Loskov House, Moscow, Mansurovsky Lane (Now houses the Embassy of Syria in Moscow)
- 1911 Kelyina Kindergarten (with I.I.Kondakov), Moscow, Bolshaya Pirogovskaya Street
- 1921 Hodel Residence & Tea House, South Pasadena (Hermon), Los Angeles
