= Syria–Russia memorandum on military bases =

2026 memorandum concerning Russian military bases in Syria

Memorandum between the Russian Federation and the Syrian Arab Republic on the operation of the bases in Khmeimim and Tartus
- Location of Syria and Russia
- Type: Memorandum of understanding
- Signed: 9 August 2026
- Parties: Syria and Russia
- Language: Arabic and Russian

The Syria–Russia memorandum on military bases is a memorandum of understanding between Syria and Russia concerning the future operation of Russian military facilities at Khmeimim and Tartus in western Syria. It was reached on 9 August 2026 after about 18 months of negotiations between the two countries.

Under the memorandum, Syria is to assume management of civilian facilities, including Hmeimim airport and a commercial berth at Tartus port. The military facilities are to be repurposed as joint Russian-Syrian training and qualification centres, with the transition expected to take place within three months.

The memorandum does not provide for a complete Russian military withdrawal from Syria. A Syrian source familiar with the agreement said that some Russian forces would remain at the new training centres, although the number of personnel had not been determined.

== Background ==
Russia has maintained a military presence in Syria since the Soviet period. Its role expanded substantially after Russia intervened in the Syrian civil war in 2015 in support of the government of Bashar al-Assad.

The Russian military presence included facilities at Tartus on the Mediterranean coast and at Khmeimim near Latakia. Tartus served as a naval repair and replenishment facility, while Khmeimim became a principal Russian air base supporting military operations in Syria.

The future of the Russian facilities became uncertain after Assad fled Syria in December 2024 and his government collapsed. Russia had been a principal international supporter of Assad and subsequently sought to maintain relations with the new Syrian authorities while protecting its strategic interests in the country.

The new Syrian authorities sought to redefine the country's relationship with Moscow. The future of the Russian facilities became one of the major issues in negotiations between Syria and Russia.

== Negotiations ==
Syria and Russia negotiated the future of the Russian military facilities for approximately 18 months before reaching the August 2026 memorandum.

The negotiations addressed the future operation of the facilities and the division between their civilian and military functions. The talks took place against the wider background of Syria's political transition and Russia's efforts to preserve its strategic relationship with Damascus.

The Russian facilities were strategically important to Moscow because they provided access to the Mediterranean. Reuters described the Tartus facility as Russia's only Mediterranean repair and replenishment hub and reported that Syria had also been used as a staging point for Russian military contractors travelling to and from Africa.

Before the agreement was reached, the Syrian government and Russian authorities continued discussions over the future of the bases and the scope of Russia's military presence in the country.

== Memorandum ==
On 9 August 2026, Syria and Russia reached a memorandum of understanding concerning the future of the Russian military bases at Tartus and Khmeimim.

The Syrian Foreign Ministry said that the memorandum would reorganize Russia's presence at the two facilities after approximately 18 months of negotiations.

The Russian Foreign Ministry subsequently described the signing as an important step toward improving bilateral military cooperation and said that the agreement would give further impetus to relations between Russia and Syria.

== Provisions ==
=== Civilian facilities ===
Under the memorandum, the Syrian state is to assume management of civilian facilities associated with the two Russian military sites.

At Khmeimim, the civilian airport facilities are to be integrated into Syrian civilian administration. At Tartus, Syria is to assume management of the commercial berth and associated civilian facilities.

The arrangement separates civilian operations from the military facilities that are to operate under the new Russian-Syrian framework.

=== Military facilities ===
The memorandum does not provide for an immediate end to Russia's military presence in Syria.

Instead, the military facilities at Tartus and Khmeimim are to be repurposed as joint Russian-Syrian training and qualification centres.

The arrangement allows Russia to retain a military role in Syria while increasing Syrian control over civilian infrastructure.

A Syrian source familiar with the terms of the agreement told Reuters that Russian forces would remain at the new training centres, although the number of personnel had not been determined.

=== Transition period ===
The transition to the new arrangements is expected to be completed within three months.

During this period, civilian facilities are to be transferred to Syrian administration while the military portions of the sites are reorganized under the joint training framework.

== Tartus ==
The Tartus facility is located on Syria's Mediterranean coast and has served as a Russian naval support facility since the Soviet period.

The facility became particularly important to Russia after its military intervention in Syria in 2015. It provided Russia with a Mediterranean logistics and naval support point and supported Russian operations in the region.

Following the collapse of the Assad government, the future of the Russian facility became one of the principal subjects of negotiations between Moscow and Damascus.

Under the August 2026 memorandum, Syria is to assume management of the commercial facilities at Tartus, while the military portion is to be incorporated into the new Russian-Syrian training arrangement.

Reuters described Tartus as Russia's only Mediterranean repair and replenishment hub and reported that Moscow regarded its Syrian facilities as important for projecting power in the Middle East, across the Mediterranean and into Africa.

== Khmeimim ==
Khmeimim is a Russian-operated military air facility near Latakia in western Syria. It became a major component of Russia's military presence in Syria following the Russian intervention in 2015.

The facility played an important role in Russian military operations in Syria and became a significant part of Moscow's presence in the eastern Mediterranean.

The future of Khmeimim became uncertain following the collapse of the Assad government. Under the August 2026 memorandum, civilian airport facilities are to be placed under Syrian administration while the military facilities are reorganized under the joint Russian-Syrian framework.

The arrangement therefore changes the organization of Russia's presence at Khmeimim without ending Russian military cooperation with Syria.

== Russian military presence ==
The memorandum represents a restructuring of Russia's military presence in Syria rather than an immediate withdrawal.

Russia regards its Syrian facilities as strategically important because they provide access to the Mediterranean and support Moscow's ability to project power in the Middle East and Africa.

Reuters reported that Russia had used Syria as a staging point for military contractors travelling to Africa and described Tartus as Russia's only Mediterranean repair and replenishment hub.

The continued presence of Russian personnel at the new training centres means that Russia retains a military role in Syria under the new arrangement.

The precise number of Russian personnel who will remain was not publicly specified at the time of the agreement.

== Reactions ==
=== Syria ===
The Syrian government presented the memorandum as a new framework for relations with Russia.

The arrangement gives Syrian authorities greater responsibility for civilian facilities while preserving a form of military cooperation with Moscow.

The agreement was reached after prolonged negotiations between the two governments concerning the future of Russia's military presence in Syria.

=== Russia ===
The Russian Foreign Ministry welcomed the memorandum.

In a statement reported by Reuters, the ministry described the signing of the 9 August memorandum as an important step toward improving bilateral cooperation in the military sphere. It said that the agreement would give further impetus to the development of relations between Russia and Syria.

Russia therefore presented the arrangement as a continuation and restructuring of bilateral military cooperation rather than the end of its presence in Syria.

=== International coverage ===
The agreement received coverage from several international news organizations.

CNN reported on the agreement as a major development concerning Russia's Mediterranean military facilities following the political transition in Syria.

The New York Times reported on the reorganization of Russia's military presence and its implications for Moscow's position in Syria and the wider region.

Deutsche Welle reported that Syria and Russia had reached an agreement concerning the future of the Russian military bases and described the development in the context of the changing relationship between Damascus and Moscow.

Bloomberg reported that Russia's Mediterranean bases would move toward a joint-control arrangement under the new agreement.

Reuters, in a report published by The Moscow Times, reported that the agreement followed 18 months of negotiations and that some Russian forces would remain at the new training centres.

== Implementation ==
The implementation of the memorandum is expected to take place over a period of up to three months.

The first practical changes were reported at Tartus port on 12 August. Syria received shipments of wheat and cement at a commercial berth that had previously been used by Russian forces. Reuters reporters observed Russian personnel moving materials away from part of the berth while Syrian authorities began operating the facility.

The operation of the berth was described by a Tartus port official as beginning immediately after Syrian authorities took control of it. Reuters reported that the berth could accommodate several vessels and included associated storage areas.

It remained unclear how many Russian military personnel would ultimately remain at Tartus and Khmeimim under the new arrangement.

== Strategic significance ==
The memorandum has implications for both Syria and Russia.

For Syria, the arrangement increases state control over civilian infrastructure at two strategically important locations while maintaining military cooperation with Russia.

For Russia, the agreement provides a framework for retaining a military role in Syria after the fall of its long-time ally Bashar al-Assad.

The facilities are also important to Russia's wider regional strategy. Tartus provides access to the Mediterranean, while Khmeimim has served as an important Russian air facility. Reuters reported that Russia viewed its bases in Syria as a source of geopolitical influence in the Middle East and as supporting power projection across the Mediterranean and into Africa.

The agreement therefore represents a restructuring of the Russian military presence rather than a complete termination of Russia's military relationship with Syria.

== See also ==
- Russia–Syria relations
- Tartus
- Khmeimim
- Syrian civil war
- Fall of the Assad regime
