= Embassy of Russia, Damascus =

Embassy of the Russian Federation in Damascus Посольство Российской Федерации в Дамаске سفارة روسيا الاتحادية في دمشق
- Location: Damascus
- Address: Omar Ben Al-Khattab Street, Adawi
- Coordinates: 33°31′33″N 36°18′01″E
- Ambassador: Aleksandr Yefimov

The Embassy of Russia in Damascus (Arabic: سفارة روسيا الاتحادية في دمشق) is the diplomatic mission of the Russian Federation to the Syrian Arab Republic. The chancery is located in Omar Ben Al-Khattab Street in Adawi, Damascus.

== History ==
The USSR Embassy in Damascus opened in February 1946. In January 1992, with the fall of the Soviet Union, it became the de facto embassy of the Russian Federation.

On 21 February 2013, the embassy was attacked as part of a bombing campaign in Damascus. On 28 December 2016, a mortar round landed in the embassy's courtyard but did not explode.

Russia evacuated some of its personnel from the embassy following the fall of the al-Assad regime in December 2024.

== Ambassadors of Russia to Syria ==
- Aleksandr Zotov (26 December 1992 to 13 September 1994)
- Viktor Gogitidze (13 September 1994 to 31 August 1999)
- Robert Markaryan (31 August 1999 to 10 November 2006)
- Sergei Kirpichenko (1 December 2006 to 7 September 2011)
- Azamat Kulmuhametov (7 September 2011 to 22 December 2014)
- Alexander Kinshchak (22 December 2014 to 29 October 2018)
- Aleksandr Yefimov (29 October 2018 to present)

== See also ==
- Russia–Syria relations
