= Stanislav Shatsky =

Stanislav Teofilovich Shatsky (alternativespelling: Shatskii) (Russian: Станисла́в Теофи́лович Ша́цкий; 13 June 1878, Smolensk – 30 October 1934, Moscow) was an important humanistic educator, writer, and educational administrator in the late Russian Empire and the early Soviet Union.

Shatskii established a number of experimental and progressive educational institutions between 1905 and 1934. A member of the Russian intelligentsia, Shatskii imported many of the values of late tsarist educational experimentation (many of which were based on the methods of American progressive education) into early Soviet approaches to creating a communist school and constructing 'a new Soviet person'.

His work as a communist educator complicates our understanding of communist education. Shatskii, unlike those who would follow him, denied the primacy of politics and class struggle in the creation of a new communist man. He also resisted indoctrinational techniques, instead preferring to demonstrate to pupils the relevance and importance of a reasoned approach to life. For Shatskii, true communist education was the release of the individual from the strictures of the capitalist system. The importance of his work is only recently being recognized as many of his publications were suppressed by Stalin and the Soviet educational orthodoxy that sought to ensure that all 'communist education' had a class-based element. He deserves a place in Russian pedagogy with Anton Makarenko and Lev Vygotsky.

He sought to build a liberal, child-centered version of communist education that drew on John Dewey's activity-based educational methods and Lev Tolstoi's focus on an aesthetically based, free education. Placing these ideas in a Marxist framework, Shatskii hoped that a communist education – founded on the principles of cooperation and self-motivation – would release the child's innate potential and help him develop into a well-rounded human being. His ideal student was a child that appreciated art, culture, and music, yet also knew the value of a hard day's work: "A child of high culture with callused hands".

== Imperial-era educational projects ==
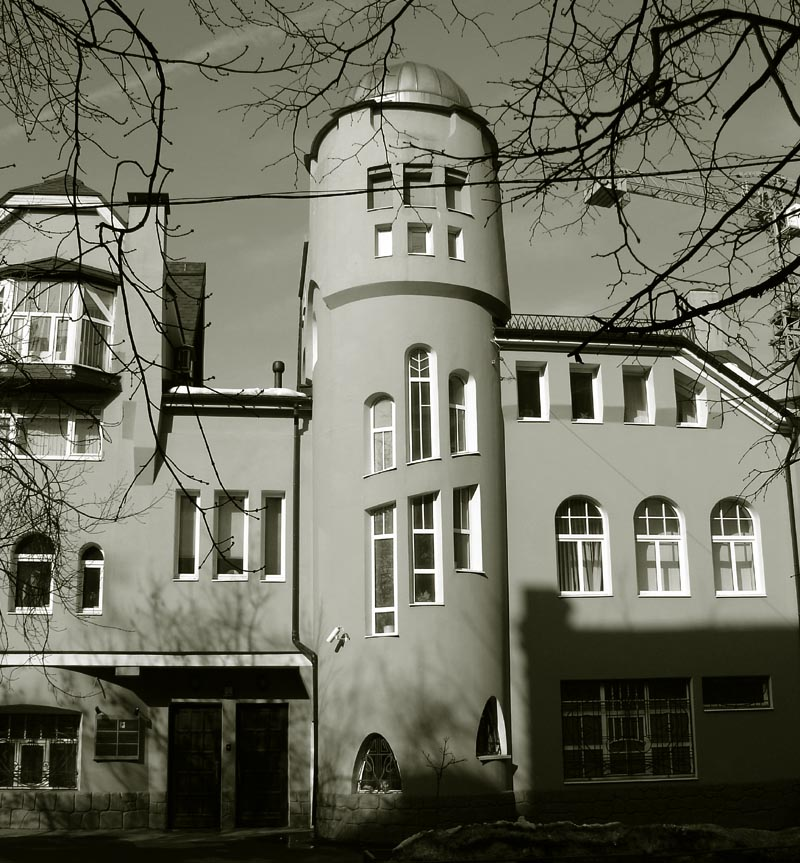
1907 Communal Club for working teenagers, funded by Nikolay Vtorov, designed and managed by Alexander Zelenko and Stanislav Shatskii

His first major educational institution was The Settlement (Setlment) which was established in northern Moscow in 1905. This complex of institutions drew its ideological inspiration from the settlement movement. Specifically modelled on the Chicago-based Hull House, where Shatskii's collaborator, architect Alexander Zelenko had lived for a year, the Settlement was a complex of children's clubs and informal classes. At the center of the Settlement was the Zelenko-designed Communal Club for working children, opened in 1907 in Moscow's blue-collar North End (Vadkovsky Lane, 5) and funded by industrialist Nikolay Vtorov. The Club was a part of a larger drive to set up a cultural and social center in remote working class district of Moscow (Miusskaya Square project).

The first of its kind in the Imperial Russia, the loose arrangement of institutions in the Settlement attracted intellectuals and businessmen who shared Shatskii's view that education was a non-violent path to healing the sores of a divided tsarist society. Due to police suspicion of seditious teaching and charges of communism, the Settlement was closed down by police in May, 1908 (Zelenko ended up in jail for a few months). Later, Shatskii established a rural summer colony called The Invigorating Life (Бодрая жизнь, Bodraia zhizn') in rural Kaluga region (near Obninsk), in which he stressed labor-based methods of education, creativity, and artistic expression.

== Soviet-era experimentation: The First Experimental Station ==
After the 1917 Russian Revolution, Shatskii's initial opposition to Soviet power faded as Soviet authorities adopted many of values and ideas of educational progressivism into their educational approach (see Declaration on the United Labor School in W. Rosenburg, Bolshevik Visions: First Phase of the Cultural Revolution, 1984). In 1919, he set up the First Experimental Station (Pervaia Opytnaia Stantsiia), which was a massive network of experimental institutions. Divided into Moscow and Kaluga sections, this organization was vast, employing hundreds of teachers, incorporating village and city schools, libraries, children's clubs, reading huts, and demanding a large amount of resources from the government. This school complex would become the envy of international progressive educators and represented the largest, most radical experimental educational institution in the world. As Stalin sought to impose ideological control over the Soviet state, the First Experimental Station was reorganized by Soviet authorities in 1932 and Shatskii was removed from his position. Shatskii died of natural causes in 1934.

== Educational leadership ==
Shatskii also became an important educational leader in the Soviet Union, developing programs for schools across Soviet Russia in his capacity as one of the leaders of the pedagogical section of the State Academic Council (Glavny Uchyony Sovet). His meteoric rise to power suggested the importance of the Russian educational intelligentsia to early Soviet governance. Shatskii eventually joined the Communist Party in 1928, but Joseph Stalin's 'Great Break' of 1928 removed Shatskii and other like-minded intellectuals from positions of power within the educational apparatus. Shatskii's First Experimental Station would be closed down by Soviet power in 1932 as part of the Stalinist shift to a more ideological approach to education. Shatskii himself died 30 October 1934, as rumors circulated that he was going to be sent to the gulag.

== Shatskii's legacy ==
Most of Shatskii's work was suppressed by Stalinist officials as the progressive approach of the Soviet Union in the 1920s was redrawn as heretical and bourgeois, but his emphasis on activity and the joy of learning could be found in later Soviet pedagogues, including Sukhomlinsky. Currently, many of Shatskii's ideas are being rehabilitated in Russia (most notably, Feliks Fradkin and Gennadii Malinin have published books and articles on Shatskii's hidden legacy - see below). Furthermore, an annual conference in Obninsk, Russia (not far from Shatskii's Kaluga-based schools of the First Experimental Station) is convened in his honor. Finally, in the west, Shatskii has been the subject of recent articles in the Slavonic and East European Review (October, 2004), the Journal of the Oxford University History Society (2005), and the History of Education (see below)

== Ideological influences ==
Shatskii drew a great deal on American Educational progressivism, particularly John Dewey. During the Soviet period, Shatskii would be influenced by Marxism, blending his own liberational, progressive educational ideas with Marx's materialist approach.

== Shatskii's major works ==
Bodraia Zhizn'. 1908.

Pedagogicheskie sochineniia, 4 vols. 1962-1965.

- Шацкий С.Т. Педагогические сочинения. В 4 т. Т.1 . - М. : Изд-во Акад. пед. наук РСФСР, 1962.
- Шацкий С.Т. Педагогические сочинения. В 4 т. Т.2 . - М. : Изд-во Акад. пед. наук РСФСР,1964. — включает в т.ч. «Система русского детского сада» (С. 55-58.)
- Шацкий С.Т. Педагогические сочинения. В 4 т. Т.3 . - М. : Изд-во Акад. пед. наук РСФСР,1964.
- Шацкий С.Т. Педагогические сочинения. В 4 т. Т.4 . - М. : Изд-во Акад. пед. наук РСФСР,1965.

A Teacher’s Experience: A Collection. Translated into English by Catherine Judelson. 1981.

== Works about Shatskii ==
D. Bershadskaia. Pedagogicheskie vzgliady i deiatel’nost S. T. Shatskogo (Moscow, 1960)

Vladimir Beliaev. Stanovlenie i Razvitie Innovatsionnoi Kontseptsii S. T. Shatskogo. Moscow, 1999.

Kevin. J. Brehony Representations of Socialist educational experiments in the 1920s and 1930s: The place of the Sciences of Education in R. Hofstetter and B. Schneuwly (Eds). Passion, fusion, tension. New Education and Educational sciences - Education nouvelle et Sciences de l'éducation (end 19th-middle 20th century - fin 19e-milieu 20e siècle. Bern, Peter Lang: 2006. 271-304.

Feliks Fradkin and Gennadii Malinin. Vospitatel'naia Sistema S. T. Shatskogo. Moscow, 1993.

Feliks Fradkin. "S. T. Shatskii’s Last Years", in School and Society in Tsarist and Soviet Russia, B. Elkof (ed.) Basingstoke, 1993.

William Partlett. "The Cultural Revolution in the Village School: S. T. Shatskii’s Kaluga School Complex, 1919-1932." Journal of the Oxford University History Society. No. 3, Michaelmas 2005.

William Partlett. "Breaching Cultural Worlds with the Village School: Educational Visions, Local Initiative, and Rural Experience at S.T. Shatsky’s Kaluga School System, 1919-1931." Slavonic and East European Review, Vol 82, No. 4, October, 2004: 847-885.

William Partlett. "Bourgeois Ideas in Communist Construction: The Development of Stanislav Shatskii's Teacher Training Methods." History of Education 35, 2006: 453-474.

William Partlett. Building Soviet Citizens with American Tools: Russian Revolutions and S. T. Shatskii's Rural Schools, 1905-1932. 2011. https://www.amazon.com/Building-Soviet-Citizens-American-Tools/dp/3846503622.

Yordanka Valkanova, and Kevin J. Brehony "The 'Gifts' and 'Contributions'. Friedrich Froebel and Russian education from 1850 to 1920." History of Education 35(2) 2006: 189-207.
