= List of ambassadors of Russia to Kuwait =

Ambassador of the Russian Federation to the State of Kuwait
- Emblem of the Russian Foreign Ministry
- Incumbent; Vladimir Zheltov since 10 March 2023
- Ministry of Foreign Affairs; Embassy of Russia in Kuwait City
- Style: His Excellency; The Honourable
- Reports to: Minister of Foreign Affairs
- Seat: Kuwait City
- Appointer: President of Russia
- Term length: At the pleasure of the president
- Website: Embassy of Russia in Kuwait

The ambassador of Russia to Kuwait is the official representative of the president and the government of the Russian Federation to the emir and the government of Kuwait.

The ambassador and his staff work at large in the Russian embassy in Kuwait City. The current Russian ambassador to Kuwait is Vladimir Zheltov, incumbent since 10 March 2023.

== History of diplomatic relations ==
Formal diplomatic relations between Kuwait and the Soviet Union were established on 11 March 1963. The first ambassador, Mikhail Cherkasov, was appointed on 27 June 1963. Exchange of ambassadors continued throughout the rest of the existence of the Soviet Union. The Soviet embassy in Kuwait was evacuated for a time following the August 1990 invasion of Kuwait by Iraqi forces, though diplomatic relations continued. With the dissolution of the Soviet Union in 1991, Kuwait recognised the Russian Federation as its successor state on 28 December 1991.

== List of representatives of Russia to Kuwait (1963–present) ==
=== Soviet Union to Kuwait (1963–1991) ===
Name	Title	Appointment	Termination	Notes
Mikhail Cherkasov	Ambassador	27 June 1963	24 September 1966	Credentials presented on 28 August 1963
Mikhail Bodrov	Ambassador	24 September 1966	8 July 1970	Credentials presented on 23 November 1966
Nikolai Tupitsyn	Ambassador	8 July 1970	8 March 1975	Credentials presented on 11 October 1970
Nikolai Sikachyov	Ambassador	8 March 1975	29 April 1983	Credentials presented on 6 April 1975
Pogos Akopov	Ambassador	29 April 1983	1986	Credentials presented on 17 May 1983
Ernest Zverev	Ambassador	17 October 1986	25 December 1991	

=== Russian Federation to Kuwait (1992–present) ===
Name	Title	Appointment	Termination	Notes
Pyotr Stegny	Ambassador	31 December 1992	24 March 1998	
Vladimir Shishov	Ambassador	24 March 1998	4 January 2003	
Azamat Kulmukhametov	Ambassador	4 January 2003	28 January 2008	
Alexander Kinshchak	Ambassador	28 January 2008	4 March 2013	Credentials presented on 28 April 2008
Aleksey Solomatin	Ambassador	4 March 2013	17 August 2018	
Nikolai Makarov	Ambassador	17 August 2018	10 March 2023	
Vladimir Zheltov	Ambassador	10 March 2023		Credentials presented on 30 May 2023
