= Guinea–Soviet Union relations =

International relations between Guinea and the USSR

- Guinea: Soviet Union

Guinea–Soviet Union relations were bilateral economic, military, and political relations between the Soviet Union and Guinea. Guinea's development model was based upon communist and socialist institutions. Declaring independence from French colonial rule on October 2, 1958, Guinea sought economic and structural support from the Soviet Union, who obliged, gaining a political advantage in the developing world. However, their plans were quickly undermined as their model failed to succeed due to unaccounted cultural and social differences between the Soviet Union and Guinea.

== Historical background ==
Following the Second World War, the Soviet economy achieved significant economic growth. This was executed via an increase in employment and the enforcement of fixed capital, which led to a rise in efficiency and a fall in production costs. The resulting increases in production and economic productivity led to rapid economic growth across the USSR during the 1950s. As a result of this success, the USSR established stable financial systems. These successes made the model successful enough to export their systems globally and proliferate their economic model around the world. Newly independent from French colonial rule, Guinea was struggling as a nation to effectively implement structural systems. Their medical system was inadequate for their population of 2.8 million and an estimated ninety percent of children were not enrolled in school. Guinea was looking for the structural assistance the USSR was eager to supply. Between 1957 and 1964, the Soviet Union attempted to implement their economic and social structures within West Africa, Ghana, and Guinea, anticipating triumphs similar to their previous domestic development projects, operating under the impression that their system was superior to any other.

== USSR ==
=== Socialism and Cold War politics ===
From the perspective of the USSR, the Third World was an opportunity for the proliferation of Soviet socialism. Rather than competing with the US through military power, the USSR opted to compete using their economic and social models, spreading their ideas around the world in an effort to undermine the American equivalent: capitalist ideologies. With the rapid growth of the USSR and their emergence as a world superpower, Nikita Khrushchev, the First Secretary of the Communist Party of the Soviet Union, was confident in the economic model and its ability to succeed in other parts of the world.

The Third World was the key player in the Soviet's political strategy. Many countries were seeking out foreign support following their hardfought independence from colonial powers and were vulnerable to the political agendas of the Cold War. Guinea was especially advantageous geopolitically, with available bases for naval and reconnaissance forces. The location was a strategic advantage for the Soviets as they would be able to monitor Western navy movements and pose a threat to Western powers. Additionally, Guinea was also rich in natural resources, further attracting the Soviets with the promise of bauxite and diamonds.

== Guinea ==
=== Guinean independence ===
Born in 1922, Sékou Touré president of the Republic of Guinea, voted “non” in the referendum held by French President Charles De Gaulle on limited autonomy within the French colonial rule. Being the sole French colony that voted against limited autonomy, Guinea was left to handle the consequences of the immediate departure of the French. Facing many difficulties following their independence from colonial domination, the Guinean government found themselves in need of support from foreign entities. With the retaliation of France, Guinea was not only short in administrative personnel, but also were in a trade deficit with inefficient exportation measures.

=== Guinea–Soviet policy goals ===
As a newly independent country, Guinea required economic support and recognition. As a neutral country with no bias towards either of the two Super Powers, they first sought help from the United States. Considering further geopolitics, nations including the US and the United Kingdom were unwilling to provide help to Guinea, attempting to prevent conflict with France. The Soviets used this opportunity to act quickly. Soviet leader Valery Gerasimov met with President Touré to discuss economic and cultural ties in addition to Soviet aid. Guinea's military dependence on the Soviet Union was one of the driving forces behind their motivation for this alliance.

Guinea soon received aid from the Communist Bloc, amounting to a loan of approximately US$127 million, the majority of which was provided by the Soviet Union. Guinea was in need of economic and technical assistance alongside aid in development of human capital, scholarships, and other programs offered by the Soviets. With aid from the Communist Bloc, Guinea was placed within the “Soviet orbit.” With Russian, Eastern European, and Chinese diplomats working in Guinea, Guinea began to solidify their relations with the Soviet Union and culturally shifted away from their neighboring African nations. Given their new association with one of the Great powers, Touré was motivated to legitimize the socialist regime. By the end of 1959, Guinea signed a commercial treaty and economic cooperation agreement with the USSR.

== Soviet development model ==
=== Economy ===
While there were many successes to implementation of decolonization policies including shifts in political power and governmental structures, Guinea struggled in the economic sector. The Soviets were eager to provide aid and support for economic growth. This economic assistance was given without regulations on its use, allowing aid to be used for show pieces such as printing plants, jets, sports stadiums, and hotels, rather than on the improvement of Guinean productivity. Moscow was highly dissatisfied with Guinea's use of funds for inefficient projects that did little to improve the country's economy. In addition to aid being inefficiently used, Russian agricultural equipment was also poorly made and inapt for Guinea, further impeding the advancement of productivity.

The USSR lacked adequate knowledge of Guinea's unique geographical economy. Colonial domination left African economies underdeveloped and heavily reliant on one sided trade with exports of raw materials to Western countries. As a result, the Soviet economic aid failed to create an efficient monetary system. Furthermore, the USSR had provided low quality machines and equipment, hampering Guinea's production and trade. Soviet economic intervention was overall unsuccessful and much more expensive for the Soviets than anticipated. Ultimately, this led to the abandonment of Guinea by the Soviets.

Guinea, built upon colonial dependency, was determined to break from its European economic decent and foster development. In an attempt to develop their national economy, Guinea set up trade monopolies which resulted in extreme costs for their consumers, high levels of corruption, and black markets. Guinea was also confronted with the relatively low value of their currency and the subsequent impact on trade. Guinean officials would often smuggle goods across borders and sell them for higher currency prices to compensate for the value of currency.

== Soviet military assistance ==
From 1959 onwards, Guinea received military aid from the Soviet Union and its satellite states. Soon after the opening of the Soviet Embassy in Conakry, Guinea received free arms from Czechoslovakia, along with a group of advisers. The supplies included 6,000 rifles, 6,000 hand grenades, 1,000 automatic handguns, about 500 bazookas, 20 heavy machine guns, 6 mortars, 6 small cannons, as well as 10 large tents, 10 sidecars, 5 field kitchens, and 2 armored Škodas, all supplied to a Guinean army of 3500 soldiers. According to French intelligence, "the value of only the first batch [of Czechoslovak weapons] exceeds Guinea's entire military budget." The Guinean Army increased further during the Portuguese invasion of Conakry. Reports indicate that additional tanks, armored personnel carriers, and artillery were provided by the Soviets and the Communist Bloc.

Military assistance continued following the establishment of diplomatic ties between the Soviet Union and Guinea. According to a study, "Between 1955 and 1970 the Soviet Union had been Guinea's sole supplier of combat aircraft, training aircraft, helicopters, tanks, and armoured personnel carriers (APC), and had supplied over sixty percent of Guinea's transport aircraft."

Between 1955 and 1978, a total of 1290 Guinean military personnel were trained in communist countries, and a total of 330 communist military technicians were present in Guinea in 1978. Along with material aid, the Soviets also extended help in building schools and providing scholarships for Guineans to get technical training in the USSR.

The Soviet-Guinea relationship was briefly diminished following the expulsion of the Soviet Ambassador, Daniel Solod from Guinea in December 1961. The tension was a result of several factors, the primary being the “Teacher’s Plot,” an attempt to overthrow president Touré. Soon after, Moscow appointed its First Deputy Premier, Anastas Mikoyan to Guinea in January 1962. This time, along with weapons, the Soviets announced a new Soviet loan of US$10 million to subsidize military costs.

== Geopolitical significance ==
Assisting Guinea's military served the USSR's geopolitical interests, as the Guinean military checkpoints could be used during times of crisis. Among the most important checkpoints were the Conakry airport, which had a strategic importance during the Angola War of Independence, Cuban Missile Crisis, and the Guinea-Bissau conflict. During the Angolan conflict, Guinea's port was used for aircraft refueling and for the transport of arms by sea. During the Cuban Missile Crisis in 1962, the Soviets requested landing rights at Conakry for reinforcement airlifts en route to Cuba. However, the USSR's request was rejected by President Touré, who had emphasized the country's neutrality. In 1969, the Soviet established a permanent naval base on the Indian Ocean which was serviced by the Somalian facilities until 1977. Similarly, the Soviets established a permanent West African patrol in 1970, allowing them access to Guinea-Bissau, and later, Angola. Guinea's strategic location on the West coast of Africa made it an important logistic base for Soviet naval forces to monitor Western navy movements, and threaten Western sea lines of communication (SLOCs). Until mid-1978, the airport facilities in Conakry were also used as a stopover point to facilitate aircraft travel to Cuba from the Soviet Union and vice versa, using Guinea's strategic location to their full advantage.

On various occasions, the Soviet Union attempted to gain authorization from the Guinean government to launch its naval activities in Guinea's ports. The first appearance of the Soviet navy was in 1969, with a group of Soviet warships visiting Conakry. By 1971, the Soviet warships were regularly using Conakry as a base of operations for the West African coast. However, there was reluctance on the part of the Guinean government in regards to the Soviet requests for the establishment and use of military bases, going so far as to revoke the right of the Soviet military's use of the Conakry airport. Similarly, reports mention that Touré had refused to allow Soviet advisers and Cuban troops to assemble in Guinea en route to Ethiopia in 1977.

== Shift in relations ==
Despite the persistent presence of the Soviet Bloc, the 1970s were a turning point for Guinean relations with neighboring countries and with Western nations. The move away from their alliance with the USSR was not the result of a single action. However, the inability to rehabilitate the Guinean economy and strict bartering terms were a significant factor. Moreover, the increased interference from the Soviets in Guinea's ports, as well as its role in many of the uprisings against president Touré, weakened the relationship between the two nations. This, in addition to the Soviet's interventions in Guinea's internal governmental affairs deteriorated their alliance, eventually leading to the slow departure of the USSR from Guinea. According to Vladislav Zubok, Guinea's tilt towards the West "cooled Soviet faith in the possibility of Africa's transformation for a decade".

Today, Russia and Guinea have maintained positive relations, even without the official alliance of the Eastern Bloc. Guinea remains a key economic outpost for Russia, still a mining resource and sponsored by Russian investment.
