= Robert Markaryan =

Russian diplomat

- Роберт Маркарян

Russian Ambassador to Croatia
- In office September 2009 – June 2015
- Preceded by: Mikhail Konarovskiy
- Succeeded by: Anvar Azimov

Ambassador for special matters of the Russian Foreign Ministry
- In office 10 November 2006 – September 2009

Russian ambassador to Syria
- In office 31 August 1999 – 10 November 2006
- Preceded by: Viktor Gogitidze
- Succeeded by: Sergei Kirpichenko

Personal details
- Born: April 20, 1949 (age 77) Baku, Azerbaijan SSR
- Party: United Russia
- Education: Institute of Asian and African Countries
- Occupation: Diplomat
- Profession: Historian
- Website: Official website

Robert Markaryan (Russian: Роберт Вартанович Маркарян, Armenian: Ռոբերտ Մարգարյան; born April 20, 1949) is a Russian diplomat. He has served as ambassador of Russia to Syria, and to Croatia. He has the federal state civilian service rank of 1st class Active State Councillor of the Russian Federation.

== Biography ==
Markaryan was born on April 20, 1949, in Baku to an Armenian family. In 1978 he graduated at the Institute of Asian and African Countries of the Moscow State University. He gained a PhD in history.

In 1996 he became a diplomat. Between 1996 and 1998 he was director of the secretariat of the Russian Foreign Ministry. During the time he was member of the ministry as well. Between 1999 and 2006 he was Russian ambassador to Syria, after which he was named an ambassador for special matters of the Russian Foreign Ministry. In September 2009 he was appointed Russian ambassador to Croatia.

He speaks Arabic and English language.

He is married with one son.
