= List of ambassadors of Russia to Syria =

Ambassador of the Russian Federation to Syria
- سفير الاتحاد الروسي في سوريا
- Emblem of the Russian Foreign Ministry
- Incumbent; Aleksandr Yefimov since 29 October 2018
- Ministry of Foreign Affairs; Embassy of Russia in Damascus
- Style: His Excellency; The Honourable
- Reports to: Minister of Foreign Affairs
- Seat: Damascus
- Appointer: President of Russia
- Term length: At the pleasure of the president
- Formation: 1944
- First holder: Daniel Solod
- Website: Embassy of Russia in Damascus

The ambassador extraordinary and plenipotentiary of the Russian Federation to the Syrian Arab Republic is the official representative of the president and the government of the Russian Federation to the president and the government of Syria.

The ambassador and his staff work at large in the Embassy of Russia in Damascus.

The post of Russian ambassador to Syria is currently held by Aleksandr Yefimov, incumbent since 29 October 2018.

== History of diplomatic relations ==
Diplomatic relations between the Soviet Union and Syria were first established in July 1944 with the exchange of diplomatic missions. Daniel Solod was the first envoy, assigned to the post on 14 September 1944, and presenting his letter of credence on 26 October 1944. On 22 November 1955 relations were further strengthened with the establishment of embassies, with the representative's status raised from envoy to ambassador. In February 1958 the United Arab Republic was formed between Egypt and Syria. The new state had its capital in Cairo and representation was provided by the Soviet ambassador to Egypt. On 27 February 1958 the embassy in Damascus became a consulate general of the USSR. The new state was short-lived. Syria seceded in 1961, and diplomatic relations were restored at the embassy level, Consul General Anatoly Barkovsky continuing as the new ambassador. With the dissolution of the Soviet Union in 1991 the last Soviet ambassador, Aleksandr Zotov, continued in post as the representative of the Russian Federation.

== List of representatives (1944–present) ==
=== Soviet Union to Syria (1944–1958) ===
Name	Title	Appointment	Termination	Notes
Daniel Solod	Envoy	14 September 1944	22 April 1950	
Ilya Tavadze	Envoy	22 April 1950	24 November 1950	
Vasily Belyaev	Envoy	24 November 1950	2 September 1953	
Sergei Nemchina	Envoy	2 September 1953	22 February 1958	Ambassador from 22 November 1955

=== Soviet Union in Damascus (1958–1961) ===
Name	Title	Appointment	Termination	Notes
Vasily Kornev	Consul general	1958	July 1961	
Anatoly Barkovsky	Consul general	July 1961	3 November 1961	

=== Soviet Union to Syria (1961–1991) ===
Name	Title	Appointment	Termination	Notes
Anatoly Barkovsky	Ambassador	3 November 1961	12 February 1968	
Nuritdin Mukhitdinov	Ambassador	12 February 1968	1 April 1977	
Yuri Chernyakov	Ambassador	1 April 1977	6 May 1979	
Vladimir Yukhin	Ambassador	6 May 1979	12 September 1984	
Feliks Fedotov	Ambassador	12 September 1984	23 September 1986	
Alexander Dzasokhov	Ambassador	24 September 1986	27 January 1989	
Aleksandr Zotov	Ambassador	27 January 1989	25 December 1991	

=== Russian Federation to Syria (1991–present) ===
Name	Title	Appointment	Termination	Notes
Aleksandr Zotov	Ambassador	25 December 1991	13 September 1994	
Viktor Gogitidze	Ambassador	13 September 1994	31 August 1999	
Robert Markaryan	Ambassador	31 August 1999	10 November 2006	
Sergei Kirpichenko	Ambassador	1 December 2006	7 September 2011	
Azamat Kulmukhametov	Ambassador	7 September 2011	22 December 2014	
Alexander Kinshchak	Ambassador	22 December 2014	29 October 2018	
Aleksandr Yefimov	Ambassador	29 October 2018		
