= List of ambassadors of Russia to Guinea =

Ambassador of the Russian Federation to the Republic of Guinea
- Emblem of the Russian Foreign Ministry
- Incumbent; Aleksey Popov since 23 June 2023
- Ministry of Foreign Affairs; Embassy of Russia in Conakry
- Style: His Excellency; The Honourable
- Reports to: Minister of Foreign Affairs
- Seat: Conakry
- Appointer: President of Russia
- Term length: At the pleasure of the president
- Website: Embassy of Russia in Guinea

The ambassador of Russia to Guinea is the official representative of the president and the government of the Russian Federation to the president and the government of Guinea.

The ambassador and his staff work at large in the Russian embassy in Conakry. The current Russian ambassador to Guinea is Aleksey Popov, incumbent since 23 June 2023.

== History of diplomatic relations ==
Diplomatic relations between the Soviet Union and Guinea were established on 4 October 1958, shortly after the country's independence from France. The first ambassador, Pavel Gerasimov, was appointed on 10 March 1959. With the dissolution of the Soviet Union in 1991, Guinea recognised the Russian Federation as its successor state in January 1992. The Russian embassy in Sierra Leone was closed in September 1992, and since 2 November 1992, the Russian ambassador to Guinea had dual accreditation to Sierra Leone. This practice continued until 21 October 2025, when Andrey Stolyarov was appointed the first ambassador solely accredited to Sierra Leone since 1992.

== List of representatives of Russia to Guinea (1959–present) ==
=== Ambassadors of the Soviet Union to Guinea (1959–1991) ===
Name	Title	Appointment	Termination	Notes
Pavel Gerasimov	Ambassador	10 March 1959	2 January 1960	Credentials presented on 24 April 1959
Daniel Solod	Ambassador	2 January 1960	10 January 1962	Credentials presented on 3 March 1960
Dmitry Degtyar	Ambassador	10 January 1962	26 November 1964	Credentials presented on 23 February 1962
Aleksey Voronin	Ambassador	26 November 1964	30 July 1968	Credentials presented on 26 December 1964
Aleksandr Startsev	Ambassador	30 July 1968	17 February 1970	Credentials presented on 9 September 1968
Anatoly Ratanov	Ambassador	17 February 1970	23 October 1973	Credentials presented on 30 March 1970
Leonid Musatov	Ambassador	23 October 1973	26 April 1978	Credentials presented on 2 November 1973
Viktor Minin	Ambassador	26 April 1978	9 March 1982	Credentials presented on 26 June 1978
Vladimir Kitayev	Ambassador	9 March 1982	17 September 1986	
Vladimir Rayevsky	Ambassador	17 September 1986	18 October 1991	

=== Ambassadors of the Russian Federation to Guinea (1991–present) ===
Name	Title	Appointment	Termination	Notes
Igor Studennikov	Ambassador	2 March 1992	27 August 1998	
Igor Ivashchenko	Ambassador	27 August 1998	25 March 2004	
Dmitry Malyev	Ambassador	25 March 2004	27 January 2011	
Aleksandr Bregadze	Ambassador	27 January 2011	4 March 2019	
Vadim Razumovsky	Ambassador	4 March 2019	23 June 2023	Credentials presented on 20 June 2019
Aleksey Popov	Ambassador	23 June 2023		Credentials presented on 24 November 2023
