= Anvar Azimov =

Russian politician and diplomat

Anvar Sarvarovich Azimov (born 22 November 1950) is a Russian politician and diplomat. He served as Ambassador to Croatia from 2015 until August 2020.

== Education and career ==
Anvar Azimov attended Moscow State Institute of International Relations managed by the Ministry of Foreign Affairs of Russia where he studied International Relations.

Azimov started his career as Minister Councilor of the Russian embassy in India in 1994. He served as Minister councilor for four years. In 1998, he was appointed Deputy Director of the Third Department of Asia of the Ministry of Foreign Affairs Russia. In 2000, he was reassigned Minister Councilor of the Russian embassy in the Federal Republic of Yugoslavia. He was the representative of the Russian Federation to the High Representative for Bosnia and Herzegovina.

In 2002, he was the Deputy Director of the Russian FM European Cooperation Department responsible for Organization for Security and Co-operation in Europe.

In 2005, Azimov was appointed Russian Ambassador to the Republic of Zambia.

In 2008, he was appointed the Permanent Representative of Russia to the OSCE in Vienna. He served as the Foreign Ministry′s special envoy from 2011 until 2015.

From 30 June 2015 until 21 August 2020, he served as Russia′s Ambassador to Croatia.
