= Alexander Kinshchak =

Russian diplomat

- Александр Кинщак

Ambassador of Russia to Syria
- In office 22 December 2014 – 29 October 2018
- Preceded by: Azamat Kulmukhametov
- Succeeded by: Aleksandr Yefimov

Ambassador of Russia to Kuwait
- In office 28 January 2008 – 4 March 2013
- Preceded by: Azamat Kulmukhametov
- Succeeded by: Aleksey Solomatin

Personal details
- Born: Alexander Alexandrovich Kinshchak; 20 October 1962
- Education: Moscow State Institute of International Relations
- Awards: Order of Honour; Order of Courage; Medal of the Order "For Merit to the Fatherland" Second Class; Order of Civil Merit of the Syrian Arab Republic

Alexander Alexandrovich Kinshchak (Russian: Александр Александрович Кинщак; born 20 October 1962) is a Russian diplomat.

== Career ==
Kinshchak graduated from the Moscow State Institute of International Relations in 1988, and went on to work in the Ministry of Foreign Affairs.

From 2002-2004 he was an adviser-envoy at the Embassy of Russia in Baghdad, and from 2006 was Deputy Director of the Middle East and North Africa Department at the Russian foreign affairs ministry.

Kinshchak was appointed by Russian president Vladimir Putin on 28 January 2008 as Ambassador of Russia to Kuwait, and he presented his credentials to Emir Sabah Al-Ahmad Al-Jaber Al-Sabah on 28 April 2008.

Between 22 December 2014 and 29 October 2018 Kinshchak served as Russian ambassador to Syria. Since 30 November 2018 he has been director of the Middle East and North Africa Department at the Ministry of Foreign Affairs.

Kinshchak was awarded the diplomatic rank of Ambassador Extraordinary and Plenipotentiary 2nd-class on 8 July 2004, followed by the first class on 4 November 2011, and then as full ambassadorial rank on 10 February 2017. He speaks Russian, English and Arabic.
