= Daniel Solod =

Soviet diplomat and orientalist (1908–1988)

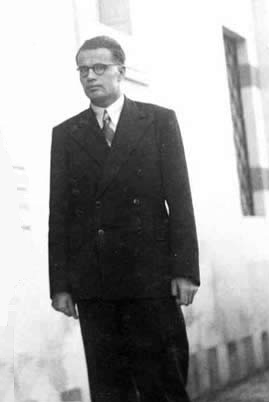

Ambassador to Egypt
- In office 12 October 1953 – 1 January 1956
- Preceded by: Semyon Kozyrev
- Succeeded by: Yevgeny Kiselyov

Ambassador to Guinea
- In office 2 January 1960 – 10 January 1962
- Preceded by: Pavel Gerasimov
- Succeeded by: Dmitry Degtyar

Personal details
- Born: 1908 Russian Empire
- Died: 1988 (aged 79–80) Soviet Union
- Party: CPSU

Daniel Semyonovich Solod (Russian: Даниил Семёнович Солод; 1908 – 1988) was a Soviet diplomat and orientalist. He began working in the Soviet diplomatic corps in 1937. In 1940 and 1941 he served as officer at the Soviet embassy in Yugoslavia. He was then transferred to Iran, where he served as an officer at the Soviet embassy from 1941 to 1943. From 1944 to 1950 he was the Soviet consul to Egypt. He served as the Soviet envoy to Lebanon and Syria. From 1953 to 1956 he returned to Egypt, as the Soviet envoy (becoming ambassador in 1954). Returning from Egypt, he was put in charge of the Near East department at the Soviet Foreign Ministry. Between 1959 and 1962 he was the Soviet ambassador to Guinea. After returning from Guinea, he worked at the Africa Institute of the Academy of Sciences of the Soviet Union until 1970.

== In Egypt ==
Solod served as the Soviet envoy to Egypt in run-up to the 1956 Suez Crisis, and held discussions with Gamal Abdel Nasser regarding arms imports from the Soviet Union. Solod also maintained contacts with the Egyptian government in discussions on Soviet aid to the construction of Aswan Dam. Apart from the contacts with the Egyptian government, he also maintained contacts with local communists. From 1955 onwards, he advised Egyptian communists to recognize Nasser as a "bourgeois nationalist".

== In Guinea ==
Solod was appointed ambassador to Guinea on 2 January 1960, succeeding Pavel Gerasimov. However, Solod's stay in Guinea was terminated by a diplomatic crisis between the two states. In November 1961, Guinean president Ahmed Sékou Touré accused Solod of being involved in the so-called "teachers' plot" (an alleged coup attempt by radical elements of the teachers' union). During a diplomatic reception in Conakry, Touré's presidential protocol officer pulled Solod out and directed him to immediately go to the Guinean Foreign Ministry. At the Foreign Ministry, he was informed that he was persona non grata in Guinea and that he had to leave the country at once.

Solod's actual role in the alleged plot is believed to have been very marginal. In January 1962 the Soviet Union sent a new ambassador to Guinea, Dmitry Degtyar. Although the Soviet Union tried to downplay the rift between the two states after Solod's departure, the Solod affair contributed to a weakening of Soviet-Guinean relations and an opening for increased links between Guinea and the People's Republic of China.
