= Embassy of Russia, Ankara =

Embassy of Russia, Ankara Russian: Посольство России в Турции Turkish: Rusya'nın Ankara Büyükelçiliği
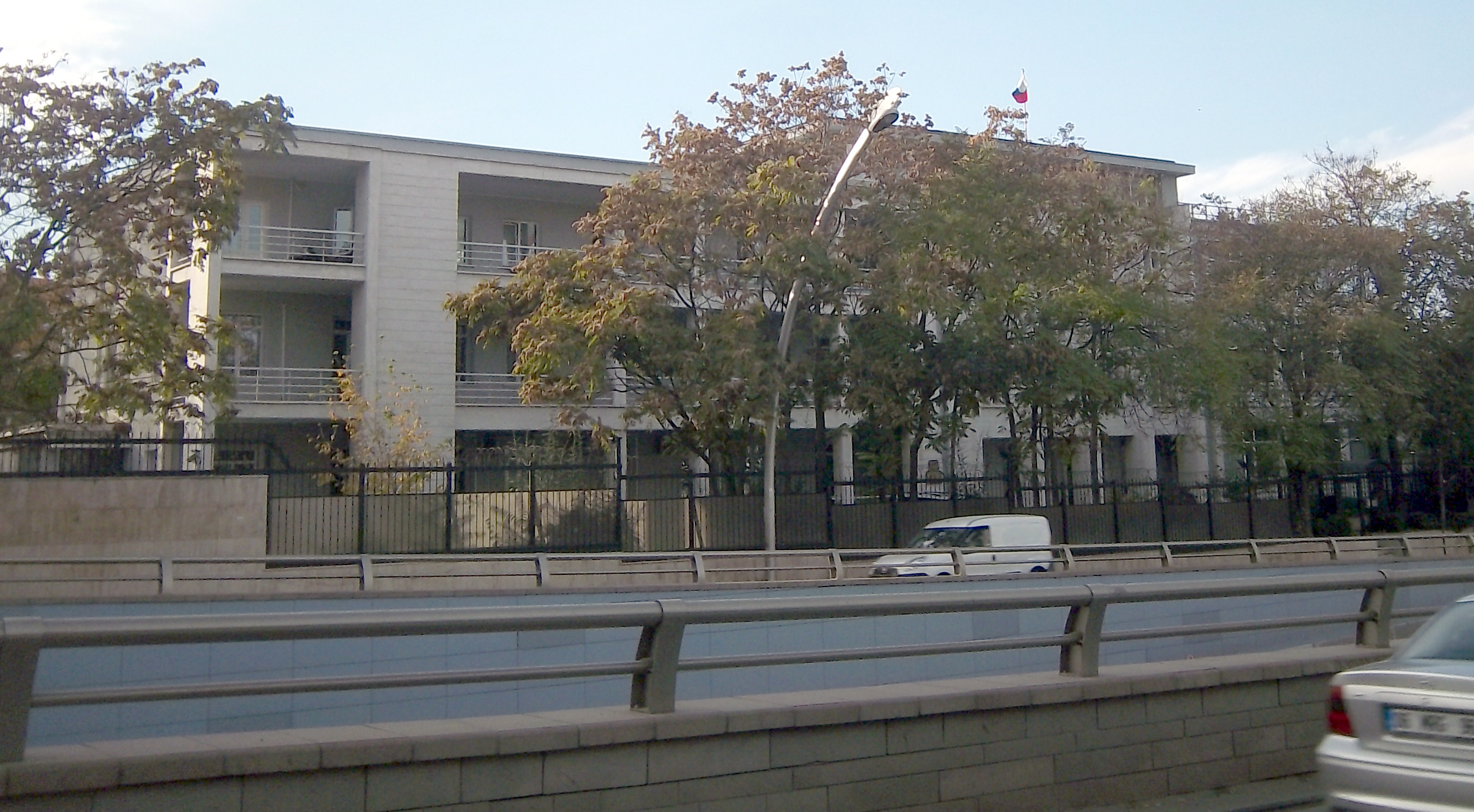
- Location: Çankaya District, Ankara, Turkey
- Address: 5 Andrea Karlova St., Çankaya District, Ankara
- Coordinates: 39°53′37″N 32°51′10″E
- Ambassador: Alexei Yerkhov
- Website: turkey.mid.ru/ru/

Embassy of Russia in Ankara (Russian: Посольство России в Турции ; Turkish: Rusya'nın Ankara Büyükelçiliği) is the official diplomatic mission of the Russian Federation in the Republic of Turkey. The current ambassador is Alexei Yerkhov.

== History ==
After the defeat of the Ottoman Empire in the First World War, the Allied Powers occupied much of the territory in the east of present-day Turkey. The leader of Turkish opposition, Kemal Ataturk, who was centered in Ankara, was in competition with the Sultan in Istanbul for authority over Turkey.

On April 23, 1920, Ataturk convened and headed the Grand National Assembly of Turkey, the new parliament of the Turkish nation. Three days later, Ataturk made a request to the Soviet Union for military assistance and an establishment of diplomatic relations.

On June 2, the Foreign Affairs Minister in Soviet Russia, Georgy Chicherin, sent a letter to Ataturk announcing Soviet Russia's recognition of the independent Turkey, and proposed to establish diplomatic and consular relations immediately. The Turks soon after sent a delegation to Moscow to negotiate a mutual assistance agreement.

On October 4, the Russian delegation arrived in Ankara, who was greeted by Kemal Ataturk at the embassy building. On November 7, the opening ceremony of the Soviet embassy took place, which was the only foreign diplomatic mission in Ankara at the time. On November 29, Ataturk sent a telegraph to Chicherin to respond to the letter from June 2. Thus, in the period from June 2 to November 29, 1920, diplomatic relations between Soviet Russia and Kemalist Turkey were established.

On March 16, 1921, Turkey and Soviet Russia signed the Treaty of Moscow. On July 20, 1921, the treaty was ratified by the All-Russian Central Executive Committee on July 20, and by the Grand National Assembly of Turkey on July 31. On September 22, 1921, the instruments of ratification were exchanged in Kars.

== List of ambassadors ==
Name	Title	Appointment	Termination	Notes
Albert Chernyshyov	Ambassador	25 December 1991	6 August 1994	
Vadim Kuznetsov	Ambassador	13 September 1994	30 June 1998	
Aleksandr Lebedev	Ambassador	30 June 1998	27 February 2003	
Pyotr Stegny	Ambassador	27 February 2003	31 January 2007	
Vladimir Ivanovsky	Ambassador	31 January 2007	12 July 2013	
Andrei Karlov	Ambassador	12 July 2013	19 December 2016	Assassinated
Alexei Yerkhov	Ambassador	19 June 2017	5 September 2025	
Aleksey Ivanov	Chargé d'affaires	5 September 2025		

== See also ==
- Russia–Turkey relations
- Russian Palace, Istanbul
- List of diplomatic missions of Russia
- List of diplomatic missions in Turkey
