= Sergei Vershinin =

- Сергей Вершинин

Ambassador of Russia to Turkey
- Incumbent
- Assumed office 20 February 2026
- Minister: Sergey Lavrov
- Preceded by: Alexei Yerkhov

Deputy Minister of Foreign Affairs
- In office 27 March 2018 – 20 February 2026
- Preceded by: Gennady Gatilov
- Succeeded by: Georgy Borisenko

Personal details
- Born: 24 July 1954 (age 72) Moscow, Russian SFSR, Soviet Union
- Education: Moscow State Institute of International Relations; MFA Diplomatic Academy

Sergei Vasilyevich Vershinin (Russian: Сергей Васильевич Вершинин; born July 24, 1954) is a Soviet and Russian diplomat. He has served as Ambassador Extraordinary and Plenipotentiary of the Russian Federation to Turkey since February 20, 2026. Previously, he served as Deputy Minister of Foreign Affairs of the Russian Federation (2018–2026). He holds the diplomatic rank of Ambassador Extraordinary and Plenipotentiary (awarded in 2007).

== Biography ==
He graduated from the Faculty of International Relations at the Moscow State Institute of International Relations of the USSR Ministry of Foreign Affairs in 1976, and from the Diplomatic Academy of the USSR Ministry of Foreign Affairs in 1991. He has been in the diplomatic service since 1976.

From 1976 to 1981, he served at the Embassy of the USSR in Morocco.

From 1984 to 1991, he served at the Embassy of the USSR in Algeria.

From 1993 to 1997, he served as Minister-Counselor at the Embassy of Russia in Tunisia.

From 1997 to 2000, he was a division head within the Department of the Middle East and North Africa at the Russian Ministry of Foreign Affairs.

From December 31, 1999, to December 8, 2003, he served as Ambassador Extraordinary and Plenipotentiary of the Russian Federation to Algeria.

From 2005 to 2018, he served as Director of the Department of the Middle East and North Africa at the Russian Ministry of Foreign Affairs.

From March 27, 2018, to February 20, 2026, he served as Deputy Minister of Foreign Affairs of the Russian Federation. In this capacity, he oversaw Middle East peace process issues, international humanitarian initiatives, cooperation with UN-affiliated organizations, and matters concerning information security within the Russian Ministry of Foreign Affairs. In June 2025, it was announced that Vershinin would become Russia's ambassador to Turkey, succeeding Alexey Yerkhov.

As of February 20, 2026, he serves as Ambassador Extraordinary and Plenipotentiary of the Russian Federation to Turkey.

He is proficient in Arabic, French, and English.

== Awards ==
- Order "For Merit to the Fatherland", 4th class (October 17, 2024) — for a major contribution to the implementation of the foreign policy course of the Russian Federation and many years of diligent diplomatic service.
- Order of Alexander Nevsky (October 4, 2019) — for a major contribution to the implementation of the foreign policy course of the Russian Federation.
- Order of Honour (September 29, 2014) — for a major contribution to the implementation of the foreign policy course of the Russian Federation and many years of diligent work.
- Order of Friendship (January 26, 2008) — for a major contribution to the implementation of the foreign policy course of the Russian Federation and many years of fruitful diplomatic service.
- Medal "For Contribution to Strengthening the Defence of the Russian Federation" (Ministry of Defence of Russia, 2019).
