= List of ambassadors of Russia to Turkey =

Ambassador of the Russian Federation to the Republic of Turkey
- Emblem of the Russian Foreign Ministry
- Incumbent; Sergei Vershinin since 20 February 2026
- Ministry of Foreign Affairs; Embassy of Russia in Ankara
- Style: His Excellency
- Reports to: Minister of Foreign Affairs
- Seat: Ankara
- Appointer: President of Russia
- Term length: At the pleasure of the president
- Website: Embassy of Russia in Turkey

The ambassador extraordinary and plenipotentiary of the Russian Federation to the Republic of Turkey is the official representative of the president and the government of Russia to the president and the government of Turkey.

The ambassador and his staff work at large in the Embassy of Russia in Ankara. There are consulates general in Istanbul, Trabzon and Antalya, and an honorary consul based in İzmir.

The post of Russian ambassador to Turkey is currently held by Sergei Vershinin as of February 20 2026.

== History of diplomatic relations ==
Diplomatic relations between the antecedent states of Russia and Turkey date back to the fifteenth century. An early Russian embassy was sent to Constantinople in the mid-1490s, during the reign of Ivan III of Russia. Representatives continued to be exchanged intermittently during the period of the Tsardom of Russia, and after the declaration of the Russian Empire in 1721. Relations were periodically suspended during periods of conflict, and finally came to a close in 1914 with the Ottoman entry into the First World War on the side of the Triple Alliance. During the war, the Russian Revolution toppled the tsar and brought an end to the empire. Relations were resumed and gradually strengthened between the Ottomans and the Russian Soviet Federative Socialist Republic from 1919 onwards, and survived the abolition of the Ottoman sultanate in 1922 and the creation of the Republic of Turkey the following year. Meanwhile the Soviet Union had been established that same year. Letters were exchanged between Mustafa Kemal Atatürk and People's Commissar for Foreign Affairs Georgy Chicherin, with the official date for the establishment of diplomatic relations being 3 June 1920, the date of Chicherin's letter. The two states remained in diplomatic contact for the remainder of the existence of the Soviet Union.

With the dissolution of the Soviet Union in 1991, Turkey recognised the Russian Federation as the successor state of the USSR, and the incumbent Soviet ambassador, Albert Chernyshyov, continued as the Russian ambassador to Turkey until 1994. Diplomatic relations fluctuated during the late twentieth and early twenty-first centuries, with tensions rising during the Russian military intervention in the Syrian Civil War, during which Turkey shot down a Russian jetfighter in 2015. Relations were normalised in the aftermath, though in 2016 the Russian ambassador to Turkey, Andrei Karlov, was assassinated by an off-duty Turkish policeman. He became the fourth Russian ambassador to be killed while in post, and the first since the Soviet ambassador to Poland Pyotr Voykov was assassinated in Warsaw in 1927.

== List of representatives (1702–1721) ==
=== Tsardom of Russia to the Ottoman Empire (1702–1721) ===
Name	Title	Appointment	Termination	Notes
Pyotr Tolstoy		1702; 5 April 1712; March 1713	20 November 1710; November 1712; 1714	
Aleksey Dashkov		1718	1721	

=== Russian Empire to the Ottoman Empire (1721–1917) ===
Name	Title	Appointment	Termination	Notes
Aleksey Dashkov		1721	1723	
Ivan Neplyuyev	Resident	January 1721	1734	
Ivan Shcherbatov		1731	1732	
Aleksey Veshnyakov	Resident	1739	1741	
Alexander Rumyantsev		16 May 1740	1741	
Aleksey Veshnyakov	Resident	1741	29 July 1745	
Adrian Neplyuyev	Resident	1746	8 November 1750	
Aleksey Obreskov	Chargé d'affaires (until 1752); Resident (after 1752)	1751	25 September 1768	
Sergey Dolgorukov	Envoy	1755	1755	
Pavel Levashov		9 August 1763	25 September 1768	
Christopher Peterson		September 1774	1775	
Nikolai Repnin		1775	1775	
Aleksandr Stakhiev		23 November 1775	21 January 1781	
Yakov Bulgakov		1781	1787	
Dmitry Tatishchev		January 1792	May 1792	
Mikhail Kutuzov		1792	1794	
Viktor Kochubey		1793	1797	
Aleksandr Khvostov		1793	February 1794	
Vasily Tomara		1798	1802	
Andrey Italinsky		1802; 1812	1806; 1816	
Grigory Strogonov		1816	1821	
Dmitry Dashkov		1821	1823	
Matvey Minchaki		1823	1827	
Aleksandr Riboper		3 February 1827	4 December 1827	
Alexey Orlov		1829	1830	Signed the Treaty of Adrianople in 1829
Apollinary Butenyov		1829	1843	
Pyotr Rikman		1837	1838	
Vladimir Titov		1840; 1843	1842; 1853	
Aleksandr Ozerov		1852	1853	
Apollinary Butenyov		1856	1859	
Aleksey Lobanov-Rostovsky		1858	1863	
Yevgeny Novikov		1862	1864	
Nikolay Ignatyev		1864	1877	
Aleksey Lobanov-Rostovsky		1878	1879	
Yevgeny Novikov		1879	1882	
Aleksandr Nelidov		1882	1897	
Ivan Zinoviev		1 July 1897	1909	
Nikolai Charykov		25 May 1909	2 March 1912	
Mikhail von Giers		1912	20 October 1914	

=== Russian Soviet Federative Socialist Republic to the Ottoman Empire (1919–1923) ===
Name	Title	Appointment	Termination	Notes
A. A. Kistyakovsky	Diplomatic representative	21 July 1919	1920	
Shalva Eliava	Authorized representative	July 1920		Appointed, did not take up post
Yan Upmal-Angarsky	Chargé d'affaires	4 October 1920	December 1920	
Polikarp Mdivani	Authorized representative	19 February 1921	May 1921	
Sergey Natsarenus	Authorized representative	31 May 1921	5 January 1922	
Semyon Aralov	Authorized representative	5 January 1922	27 April 1923	Ottoman sultanate abolished on 1 November 1922
Marcel Rosenberg	Chargé d'affaires	1923	1923	
Yakov Surits	Ambassador	14 June 1923	23 July 1923	

=== Union of Soviet Socialist Republics to the Republic of Turkey (1923–1991) ===
Name	Title	Appointment	Termination	Notes
Yakov Surits	Diplomatic representative	23 July 1923	19 June 1934	Republic of Turkey formed on 29 October 1923
Lev Karakhan	Diplomatic representative	29 June 1934	7 May 1937	
Mikhail Karsky	Diplomatic representative	7 May 1937	25 November 1937	
Aleksey Terentyev	Diplomatic representative	3 April 1938	17 September 1940	
Sergey Vinogradov	Diplomatic representative (before 9 May 1941); Ambassador (after 9 May 1941)	17 September 1940	24 February 1948	
Aleksandr Lavrishchev	Ambassador	24 February 1948	19 January 1954	
Boris Podtserob	Ambassador	19 January 1954	24 February 1957	
Nikita Ryzhov	Ambassador	24 February 1957	19 May 1966	
Andrey Smirnov	Ambassador	19 May 1966	6 January 1969	
Vasily Grubyakov	Ambassador	28 January 1969	23 December 1974	
Aleksei Rodionov	Ambassador	23 December 1974	31 October 1983	
Vladimir Lavrov	Ambassador	31 October 1983	3 July 1987	
Albert Chernyshyov	Ambassador	3 July 1987	25 December 1991	

=== Russian Federation to the Republic of Turkey (1991–present) ===
Name	Title	Appointment	Termination	Notes
Albert Chernyshyov	Ambassador	25 December 1991	6 August 1994	
Vadim Kuznetsov	Ambassador	13 September 1994	30 June 1998	
Aleksandr Lebedev	Ambassador	30 June 1998	27 February 2003	
Pyotr Stegny	Ambassador	27 February 2003	31 January 2007	
Vladimir Ivanovsky	Ambassador	31 January 2007	12 July 2013	
Andrei Karlov	Ambassador	12 July 2013	19 December 2016	Assassinated
Alexei Yerkhov	Ambassador	19 June 2017	5 September 2025	
Aleksey Ivanov	Chargé d'affaires	5 September 2025	25 March 2026	
Sergei Vershinin	Ambassador	20 February 2026		

== See also ==
- List of ambassadors of Turkey to Russia
- Russia–Turkey relations
