= Boris Podtserob =

Soviet diplomat

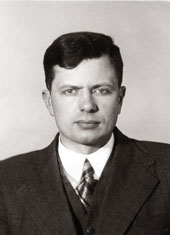
Boris Podtserob

Boris Fyodorovich Podtserob (Russian: Борис Фёдорович Подцероб; 18 July [O.S. 5 July] 1910, Saint Petersburg – 11 February 1983, Moscow) was a Soviet and Belarusian diplomat.

== Career ==
From 1937 he was employed in the People's Commissariat of Foreign Affairs. From 1943—1949 he was the Senior Assistant to Vyacheslav Molotov, the People's Commissar of the Ministry of Foreign Affairs, during which time he participated at the Yalta Conference. From 1949—1952 he was the Secretary General of the Ministry of Foreign Affairs.

Podtserob served as an interpreter for the entirety of General Charles de Gaulle's diplomatic visit to the USSR in December 1944, attending and translating every meeting between Stalin and the free French leader. This level of intimacy caused Stalin to joke he should send the interpreter to Siberia.

In 1953 he became the head of the European Department of the MFA of the USSR, and served in this post until his first diplomatic posting on 19 January 1954 as Ambassador of the Soviet Union to Turkey; a post he held until 24 February 1957.

He returned to Moscow at the end of his posting to the position of Secretary General of the MFA, and held this position until 30 June 1965 when he was posted to Vienna as Ambassador of the Soviet Union to Austria. At the end of his posting in the Austrian capital on 20 September 1971, he returned to Moscow once again, as an Ambassador-at-large of the Soviet Union, and continued his diplomatic work until he died on 11 February 1983 at the age of 72. His obituary in Izvestia, which was signed by Yuri Andropov and Andrei Gromyko, did not specify a cause of death.
