= Filipp Sidorsky =

Soviet and Russian diplomat (1937–2023)

- Филипп Сидорский

Ambassador of Russia to Bosnia and Herzegovina
- In office 26 January 1998 – 25 December 2000
- Preceded by: Yakov Gerasimov
- Succeeded by: Aleksandr Grishchenko

Ambassador of Russia to Uzbekistan
- In office 18 March 1992 – 25 April 1997
- Succeeded by: Aleksandr Patsev

Personal details
- Born: 21 August 1937 Moscow, Russian SFSR, Soviet Union
- Died: 27 February 2023 (aged 85)
- Education: Moscow State Institute of International Relations; Diplomatic Academy of the Ministry of Foreign Affairs
- Awards: Order of Friendship; Order of Friendship of Peoples; Order of the Badge of Honour

Filipp Filippovich Sidorsky (Russian: Филипп Филиппович Сидорский; 21 August 1937 – 27 February 2023) was a Soviet and Russian diplomat. He served in various diplomatic roles from 1966 onwards, and was Ambassador of Russia to Uzbekistan between 1992 and 1997, and to Bosnia and Herzegovina from 1998 to 2000.

== Career ==
Sidorsky was born on 21 August 1937, in Moscow, then part of the Russian Soviet Federative Socialist Republic, in the Soviet Union. He initially began working as a projectionist in 1954, and later as an electrician, and a tunneller at Metrostroy. He began his career in the Soviet Foreign Ministry in 1966, graduating from Moscow State Institute of International Relations that year, and entering the diplomatic service.

Sidorsky worked in various diplomatic positions in the Soviet, and later Russian, foreign ministry, and its diplomatic missions abroad. He graduated from the Diplomatic Academy of the Ministry of Foreign Affairs in 1978, and worked in the Soviet embassy in Iran, and from 1988 to 1992, was Minister-Counselor of the embassy in Afghanistan. On 18 March 1992, he was appointed the first ambassador of the Russian Federation to Uzbekistan, following the dissolution of the Soviet Union. His appointment was concurrent with one to serve as head of delegation to the negotiation with the Republic of Uzbekistan "on issues of bilateral relations, representing mutual interest in political, military, economic, social and humanitarian areas." Diplomatic relations between the Russian Federation and the Republic of Uzbekistan were officially established on 20 March 1992. The Treaty on the Fundamentals of Interstate Relations, Friendship and Cooperation was signed several months later, on 30 May 1992. The Tajikistani Civil War began shortly after Sidorsky's arrival in post, with the suggestion that Russian military forces were taking sides within the country. Sidorsky worked to deny that Russian forces would destabilise Uzbekistan, noting that "the former Soviet military units in Uzbekistan were under the control of the Uzbek government". He was awarded the Order of Friendship on 21 June 1996.

Sidorsky left the post on 25 April 1997, becoming an ambassador-at-large. On 26 January 1998, he was appointed ambassador to Bosnia and Herzegovina, until his recall on 25 December 2000. He retired in 2001. In addition to his native Russian, Sidorsky spoke English, Persian, and Pashto. He was married, with a son.

Sidorsky died on 27 February 2023, at the age of 85. Over his career he had received several awards and honours, including the Order of Friendship, the Order of Friendship of Peoples, and the Order of the Badge of Honour. Sidorsky's obituary by the Russian Foreign Ministry noted that he was "a highly professional diplomat and a wonderful person, a responsible and energetic leader, [and] a versatile specialist."
