= List of ambassadors of Russia to Bosnia and Herzegovina =

Ambassador of the Russian Federation to Bosnia and Herzegovina
- Emblem of the Russian Foreign Ministry
- Incumbent; Igor Kalbukhov since 6 November 2020
- Ministry of Foreign Affairs; Embassy of Russia in Sarajevo
- Style: His Excellency
- Reports to: Minister of Foreign Affairs
- Seat: Sarajevo
- Appointer: President of Russia
- Term length: At the pleasure of the president
- Website: Embassy of Russia in Bosnia and Herzegovina

The ambassador extraordinary and plenipotentiary of the Russian Federation to Bosnia and Herzegovina is the official representative of the president and the government of the Russian Federation to the presidency and the government of Bosnia and Herzegovina.

The ambassador and his staff work at large in the Embassy of Russia in Sarajevo. The post of Russian ambassador to Bosnia and Herzegovina is currently held by Igor Kalbukhov, incumbent since 6 November 2020.

== History of diplomatic relations ==
With the breakup of Yugoslavia in 1992, the Russian Federation recognized the independence of Bosnia and Herzegovina on 27 April 1992, with diplomatic relations established on 26 December 1996. The first Russian ambassador was Yakov Gerasimov.

== Representatives of the Russian Federation to Bosnia and Herzegovina (1996–present) ==
Name	Title	Appointment	Termination	Notes
Yakov Gerasimov	Ambassador	December 1996	January 1998	
Filipp Sidorsky	Ambassador	25 January 1998	25 December 2000	
Aleksandr Grishchenko	Ambassador	25 December 2000	30 March 2005	
Konstantin Shuvalov	Ambassador	30 March 2005	1 September 2009	
Aleksandr Botsan-Kharchenko	Ambassador	1 September 2009	6 August 2014	
Pyotr Ivantsov	Ambassador	6 August 2014	6 November 2020	
Igor Kalbukhov	Ambassador	6 November 2020		
