= Georgy Borisenko (diplomat) =

- Георгий Борисенко

Deputy Minister of Foreign Affairs
- Incumbent
- Assumed office 20 February 2026
- Minister: Sergey Lavrov
- Preceded by: Sergei Vershinin

Ambassador of Russia to Egypt
- In office 27 April 2020 – 20 February 2026
- Preceded by: Sergei Kirpichenko

Personal details
- Born: 10 July 1968 (age 58) Krasnodar, Russian SFSR, Soviet Union
- Education: Moscow State Institute of International Relations

Georgy Evgenievich Borisenko (Russian: Георгий Евгеньевич Борисенко; born July 10, 1968) is a Russian diplomat. He holds the diplomatic rank of Ambassador Extraordinary and Plenipotentiary (2018). He has been Deputy Minister of Foreign Affairs since February 20, 2026.

== Biography ==
Georgy Borisenko was born on July 10, 1968, in Krasnodar, Stavropol Krai.

He graduated from the Faculty of International Economic Relations at the Moscow State Institute of International Relations under the Soviet Ministry of Foreign Affairs, in 1990. After graduating, he began working in diplomacy. He held various positions at the USSR/Russian Embassy in Switzerland, the Permanent Mission of Russia to the OSCE in Vienna, and the General Secretariat of the Russian Ministry of Foreign Affairs.

From 2003 to 2011, he served as Counselor, Senior Counselor, and Minister-Counselor at the Russian Embassy in the United States.

In 2011, he assumed the post of deputy director of the North American Department of the Russian Ministry of Foreign Affairs.

On December 1, 2014, he assumed his duties as Director of the North American Department of the Russian Ministry of Foreign Affairs.

By decree of Russian President Vladimir Putin on April 27, 2020, he was appointed Ambassador of the Russian Federation to Egypt. He was also concurrently appointed as the Plenipotentiary Representative of the Russian Federation to the League of Arab States in Cairo.

On February 14, 2026, he announced the completion of his tenure as Ambassador to Egypt. On February 20, he was relieved of his duties as Ambassador and transferred to the position of Deputy Minister of Foreign Affairs of the Russian Federation, replacing Sergei Vershinin. He oversees relations with countries in the Middle East and Africa.

He is married and has a daughter and a son. He speaks English and German.

== Diplomatic Rank ==
- Envoy Extraordinary and Plenipotentiary, 2nd Class (June 12, 2011).
- Envoy Extraordinary and Plenipotentiary, 1st Class (June 1, 2015).
- Ambassador Extraordinary and Plenipotentiary (February 10, 2018).

== Awards ==
- Order of Friendship (July 11, 2018) — for significant contribution to the implementation of the foreign policy of the Russian Federation and long-term conscientious service.
- Order of Honour (May 21, 2024) — for significant contribution to the implementation of the foreign policy of the Russian Federation and long-term conscientious diplomatic service.
