= List of ambassadors of Russia to Uzbekistan =

Ambassador of the Russian Federation to the Republic of Uzbekistan
- Emblem of the Russian Foreign Ministry

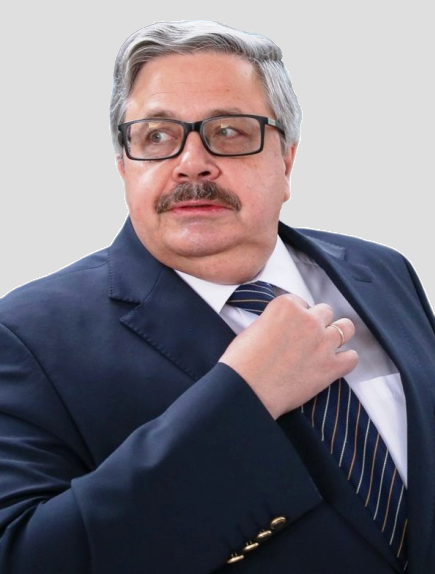
- Incumbent; Alexei Yerkhov since 5 September 2025
- Ministry of Foreign Affairs; Embassy of Russia in Tashkent
- Style: His Excellency; The Honourable
- Reports to: Minister of Foreign Affairs
- Seat: Tashkent
- Appointer: President of Russia
- Term length: At the pleasure of the president
- Website: Embassy of Russia in Uzbekistan

The ambassador extraordinary and plenipotentiary of the Russian Federation to the Republic of Uzbekistan is the official representative of the president and the government of the Russian Federation to the president and the government of Uzbekistan.

The ambassador and his staff work at large in the Embassy of Russia in Tashkent. The post of Russian ambassador to Uzbekistan is currently held by Alexei Yerkhov, incumbent since 5 September 2025.

== History of diplomatic relations ==
With the dissolution of the Soviet Union in 1991, diplomatic relations between the Russian Federation and the Republic of Uzbekistan were first established on 20 March 1992.

== Representatives of the Russian Federation to the Republic of Uzbekistan (1992–present) ==
Name	Title	Appointment	Termination	Notes
Filipp Sidorsky	Ambassador	18 March 1992	25 April 1997	
Aleksandr Patsev	Ambassador	25 April 1997	29 August 1999	
Dmitry Ryurikov	Ambassador	29 October 1999	17 June 2003	
Farit Mukhametshin	Ambassador	17 June 2003	17 October 2008	
Vladimir Tyurdenev	Ambassador	23 November 2009	5 March 2021	
Oleg Malginov	Ambassador	5 March 2021	5 September 2025	
Alexei Yerkhov	Ambassador	5 September 2025		
