= Russians in Turkey =

Total population
- 257,674

Regions with significant populations
- Istanbul; Ankara; Antalya; İzmir

Languages
- Russian; Turkish

Religion
- Russian Orthodoxy; Other

257,674 Russians hold residence permits and are currently living in Turkey.

== History ==
Russians began migrating to Turkey during the first half of the 1990s. Most had fled the economic problems prevalent after the dissolution of the Soviet Union. During this period, many intermarried and assimilated with locals, bringing a rapid increase in mixed marriages. There is a Russian Association of Education, Culture and Cooperation, which aims to expand Russian language and culture in Turkey as well as promote the interests of the community.

Following the 2022 Russian invasion of Ukraine, many Russians have fled to Turkey after Vladimir Putin announced a "partial mobilization" of military reservists. Around 50,000 Russians had moved to Antalya by September 2022, as well as 18,000 Ukrainians.

== Demographics ==
Types of Residence Permit and Population
Type of Permit	Population
Long-Term	78,748
Short-Term	36,544
Family	16,959

== Education ==
Russian schools:

- Russian Consulate School in Istanbul
- Russian Embassy School in Ankara
- Private International Moscow School in Antalya
- International Russian School in Antalya

== See also ==
- Russia–Turkey relations
- Turks in Russia
