= List of ambassadors of Turkey to Russia =

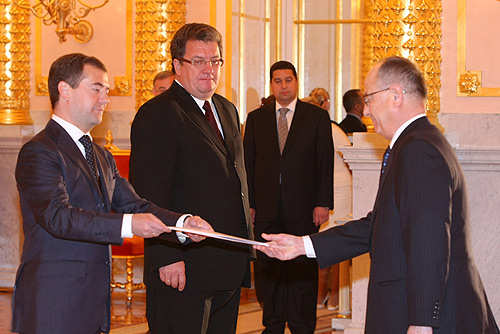
Akıncı presenting his credentials to Dmitry Medvedev in September 2008.

The ambassador of Turkey to Russia is the official representative of the president and the government of the Republic of Turkey to the president and government of the Russian Federation.

== List of ambassadors ==
Ambassador	Term start	Term end	Ref.
Ali Fuat Cebesoy	18 February 1921	9 May 1922	
Enis Akaygen	1 November 1923	30 June 1925	
Zekai Apaydın	1 July 1925	30 October 1927	
Tevfik Bıyıktay	9 December 1927	13 May 1928	
Vasıf Çınar	13 November 1928	29 January 1929	
Hüseyin Baydur	18 March 1929	15 July 1934	
Vasıf Çınar	9 September 1934	2 June 1935	
Zekai Apaydın	8 July 1935	6 July 1939	
Ali Haydar Aktay	15 August 1939	1 August 1942	
Cevat Açıkalın	13 August 1942	7 August 1943	
Hüseyin Baydur	14 October 1943	17 October 1944	
Selim Sarper	28 October 1944	23 September 1946	
Faik Zihni Akdur	4 December 1946	11 July 1949	
Ali Muzaffer Göker	27 November 1949	15 April 1952	
Faik Hozar	26 November 1952	4 January 1954	
Seyfullah Esin	20 October 1954	23 November 1955	
Kemal Kavur	9 January 1956	18 April 1960	
Fahri Korutürk	6 August 1960	5 September 1964	
Hasan Esat Işık	19 October 1964	22 February 1965	
Vahit Halefoğlu	30 June 1965	26 April 1966	
Hasan Esat Işık	30 April 1966	4 June 1968	
Turan Tuluy	15 July 1968	14 August 1969	
Fuat Bayramoğlu	14 September 1969	17 December 1971	
Adnan Kural	16 February 1972	17 May 1972	
İlter Türkmen	3 November 1972	9 September 1975	
Namık Yolga	1 April 1976	14 July 1979	
Ercüment Yavuzalp	10 August 1979	18 July 1982	
Vahit Halefoğlu	12 September 1982	8 December 1983	
Oktay Cankardeş	17 April 1984	19 August 1988	
Volkan Vural	10 September 1988	17 March 1993	
Ayhan Kamel	4 April 1993	16 December 1994	
Bilgin Unan	27 December 1994	5 April 1998	
Nabi Şensoy	19 April 1998	15 June 2002	
Kurtuluş Taşkent	29 June 2002	15 May 2008	
Halil Akıncı	1 May 2008	10 August 2010	
Aydın Adnan Sezgin	15 August 2010	17 September 2014	
Ümit Yardım	28 September 2014	15 November 2016	
Hüseyin Lazip Diriöz	15 November 2016	15 January 2019	
Mehmet Samsar	14 January 2019	Present	

== See also ==
- List of ambassadors of Russia to Turkey
- Russia–Turkey relations
