= Turks in Russia =

Ethnic group in Russia

Total population
- 109,883 (2010 census)

Regions with significant populations
- Belgorod Oblast; Kabardino-Balkaria; Krasnodar Krai; North Ossetia–Alania; Rostov Oblast; Stavropol Krai

Languages
- Turkish; Russian

Religion
- Predominantly Sunni Islam; Minority Alevism, Sufism, and Bektashism

Turks in Russia (Turkish: Rusya'daki Türkler, Russian: Турки в России), also referred to as Turkish Russians or Russian Turks, refers to people of full or partial ethnic Turkish origin who have either immigrated to Russia or who were born in the Russian state. The community is largely made up of several migration waves, including: descendants of Ottoman-Turkish captives during the Russo-Turkish wars; the Turkish Meskhetian community; and the more recent Turkish immigrants from the Republic of Turkey.

== History ==
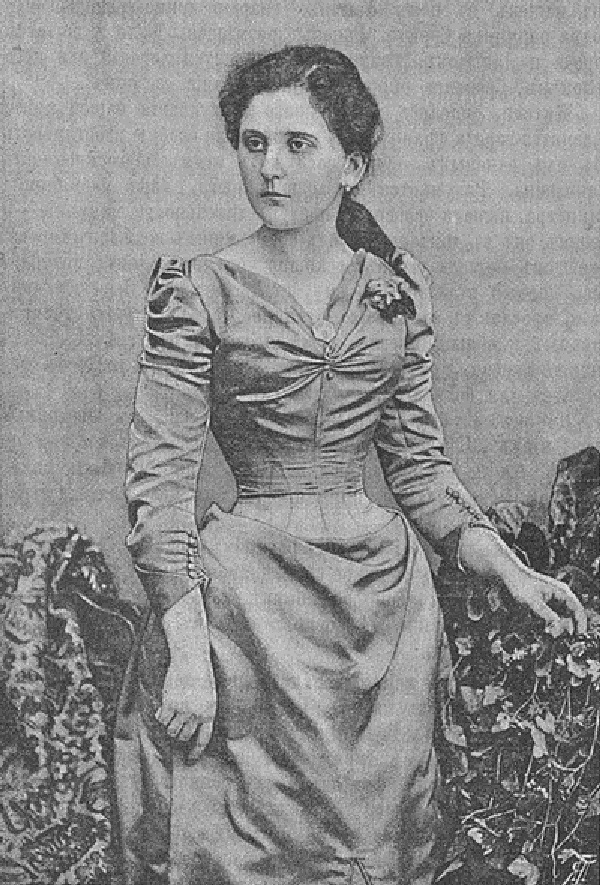
After being found aged 4 in Ottoman Bulgaria, Ayşe was adopted by Russian soldiers during the Russo-Turkish War (1877–1878) and Christened under the name Maria Kexholmskaia.

=== Ottoman migration ===
The First All-Union Census of the Soviet Union in 1926 recorded 8,570 Ottoman Turks living in the Soviet Union. The Ottoman Turks are no longer listed separately in the census, as it is presumed that those who were living in Russia in the 1920s have subsequently either been assimilated into Russian society or have left the country.

=== Meskhetian Turks migration ===
During World War II, the Soviet Union was preparing to launch a pressure campaign against Turkey. Vyacheslav Molotov, who was at the time the Minister of Foreign Affairs, made a request of the Turkish Ambassador in Moscow that Turkey surrender three Anatolian provinces (Kars, Ardahan and Artvin).^{[11]} Thus, war against Turkey seemed possible, and Joseph Stalin wanted to commit a genocide to the strategic Turkish population situated in Meskheti, near the Turkish-Georgian border, since during the Russo-Turkish Wars the Turks of the region had been loyal to the Ottoman Empire and were therefore likely to be hostile to Soviet intentions.^{[11][12]} In 1944, the Meskhetian Turks were forcefully deported from Meskheti, Georgia and accused of smuggling, banditry and espionage in collaboration with their kin across the Turkish border.^{[13]}

Soviet authorities issued an official ruling that 17,000 Meskhetian Turks, virtually the entire Turkish population in the Ferghana Valley, be transported to Russia. Another 70,000 Meskhetian Turks from other parts of Uzbekistan soon followed the first wave of migrants and settled mainly in Azerbaijan and Russia.

In the late 1970s, the Stavropol and Krasnodar authorities visited various regions of Uzbekistan to invite and recruit Meskhetian Turks to work in agriculture enterprises in southern Russia. In 1985, Moscow issued a proposal inviting more Meskhetian Turks to move to villages in southern Russia that had been abandoned by ethnic Russians who were moving to the cities. However, the Meskhetian Turks response was that they would only leave Uzbekistan if the move were to be to their homeland. Then, in 1989, ethnic Uzbeks began a series of actions against the Turks; they became the victims of riots in the Ferghana valley which led to over a hundred deaths. Within days, Decision 503 was announced "inviting" the Turks to occupy the empty farms in southern Russia that they had resisted moving to for years and around 17,000 Meskhetian Turks were evacuated to Russia. Meskhetian Turks maintain that Moscow had planned the Uzbek riots. By the early 1990s, the 70,000 Meskhetian Turks who were still resident in Uzbekistan left for Azerbaijan, Russia and Ukraine due to fears of continued violence.

=== Mainland Turkish migration ===
During the 2000s, Russia witnessed increasing numbers of immigrants from Turkey; the number of Turkish labour migrants grew, on average, by 30–50% per annum. By 2008, over 130,000 Turkish citizens were working in Russia; most Turkish immigrants are those who married Russians in Turkey and then came to reside in the homeland of their spouse.

== Demographics ==
According to the 2010 Russian Census, 105,058 people declared themselves as "Turks" and 4,825 stated that they were "Meskhetian Turks"; hence, the census showed that there was a total of 109,883 Turks living in the country.

Turks in Russia according to the Russian Census
Russian census	Turks
1939	2,936
1959	1,377
1970	1,568
1979	3,561
1989	9,890
2002	95,672
2010	109,883

== Discrimination ==
Meskhetian Turks in Russia, especially those in Krasnodar, have faced hostility from the local population. The Meskhetian Turks of Krasnodar have suffered significant human rights violations, including the deprivation of their citizenship. They have been deprived of civil, political and social rights and are prohibited from owning property and employment. Since 2004, many are now leaving the Krasnodar region for the United States as refugees.

== Noble families ==
- Tarakanovs
- Turchaninov family
- ru:House of Kutaisov
- Zaplatin family

== Notable people ==
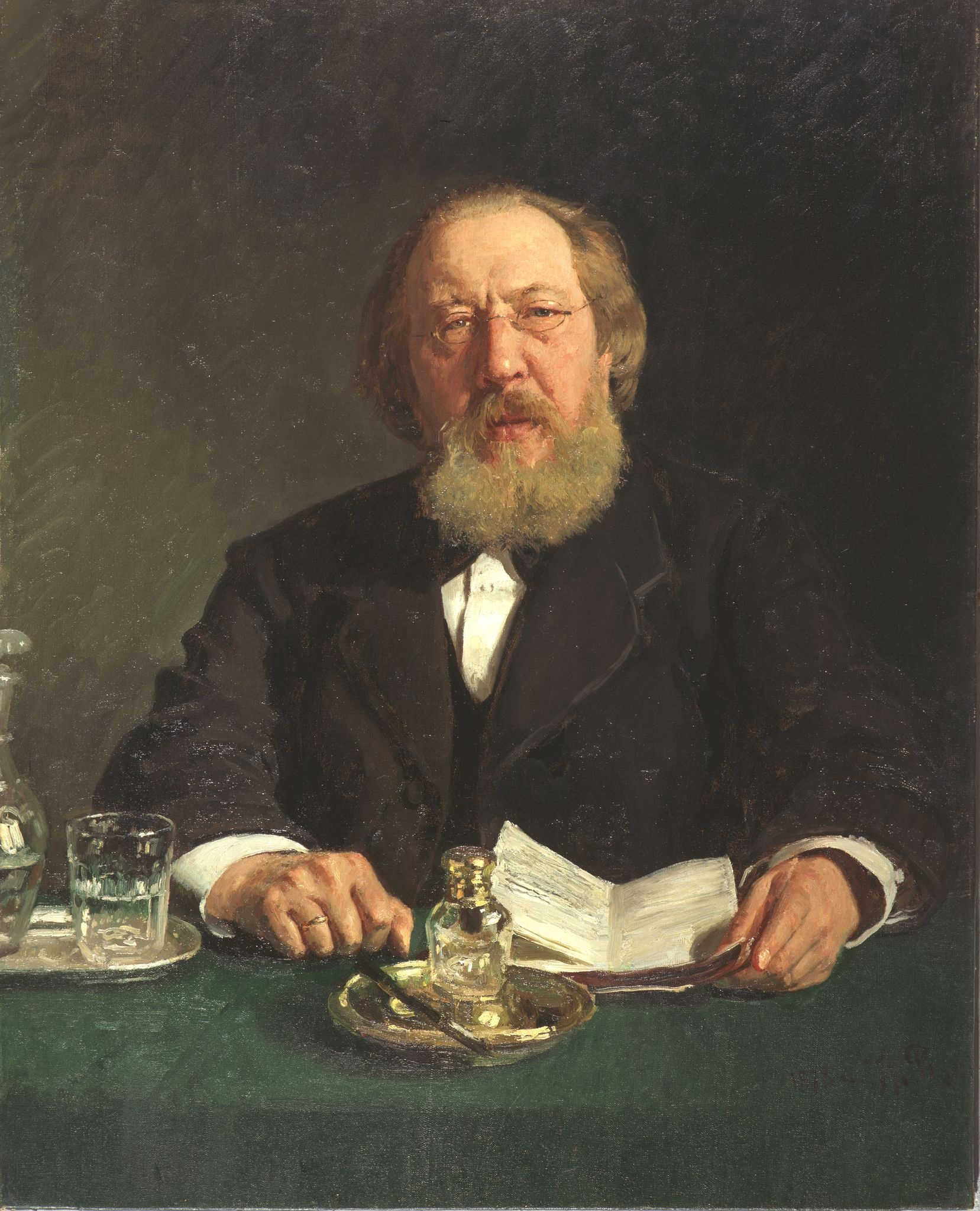
Ivan Aksakov

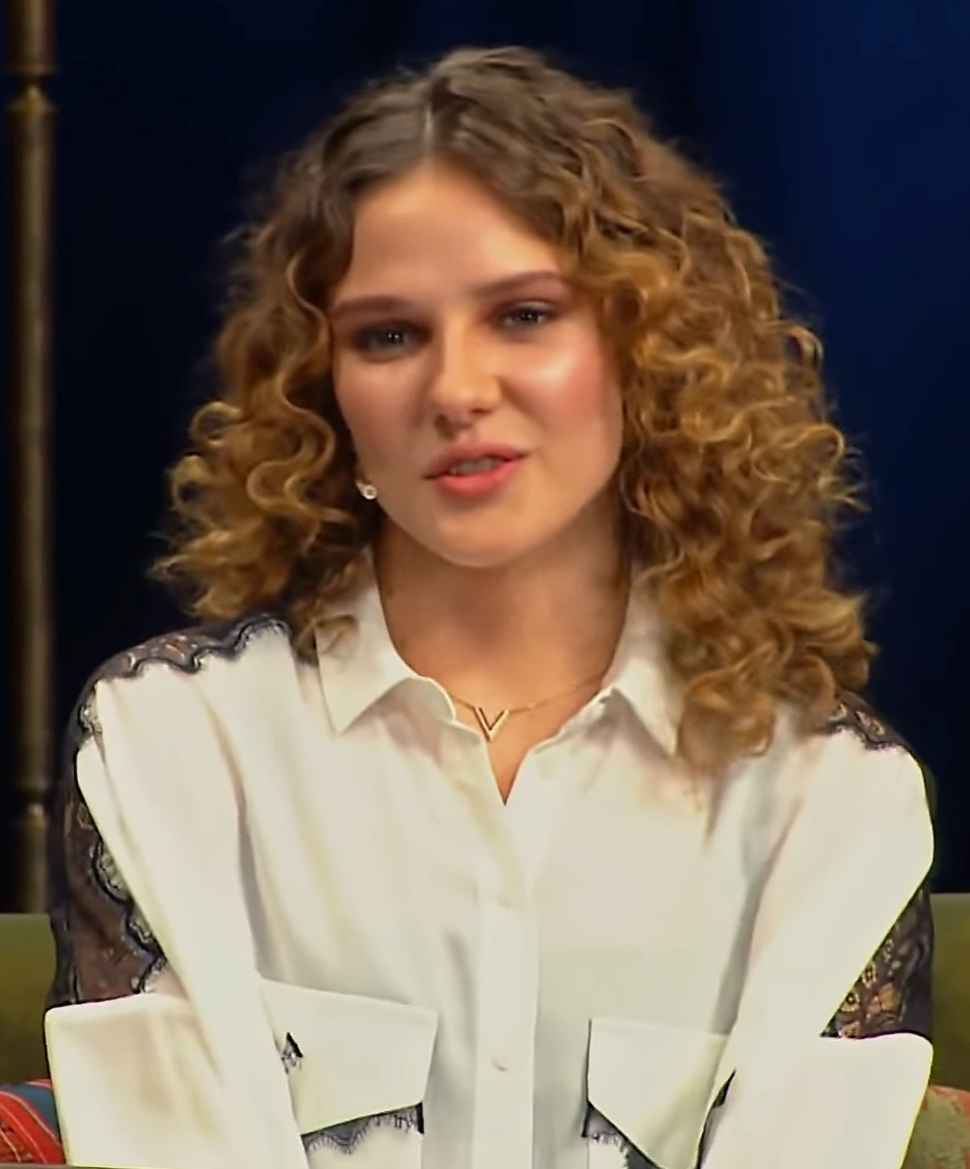
Alina Boz

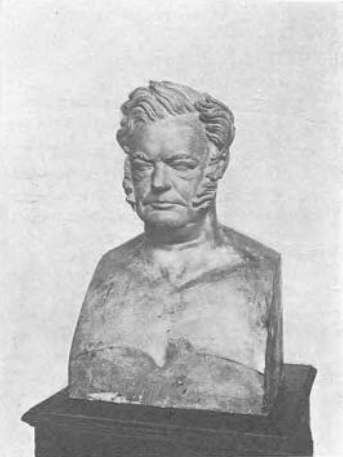
Vasily Ekimov

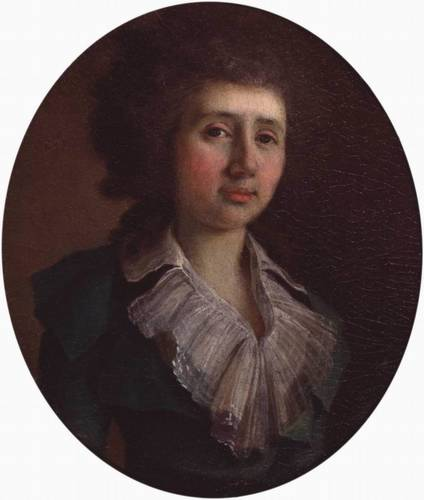
Vasily Kapnist

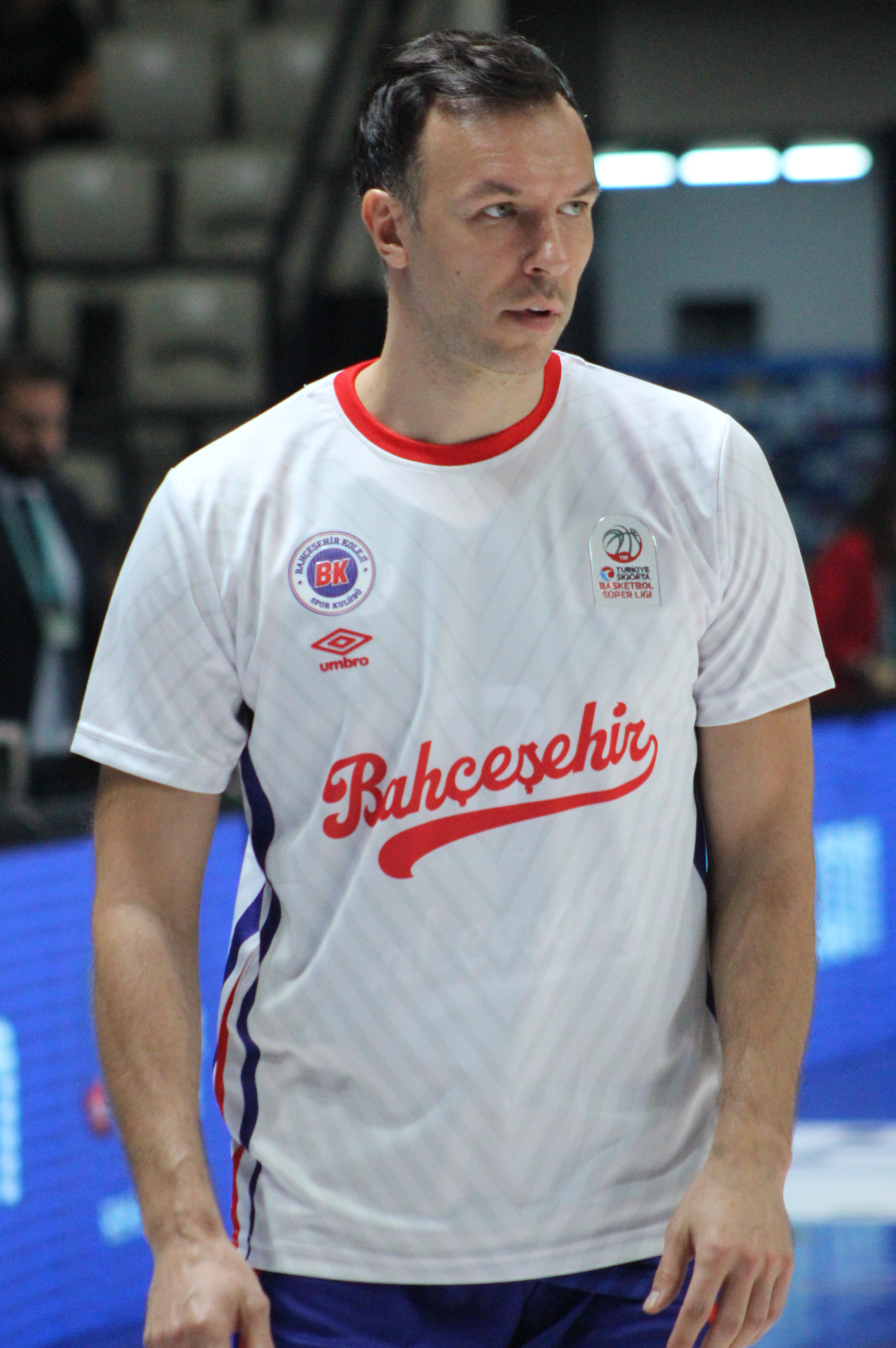
Can Maxim Mutaf

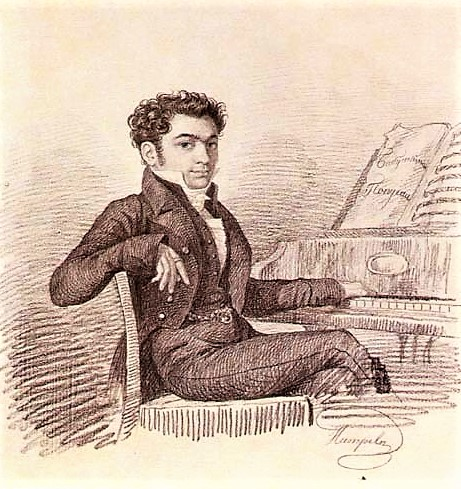
Alexey Verstovsky

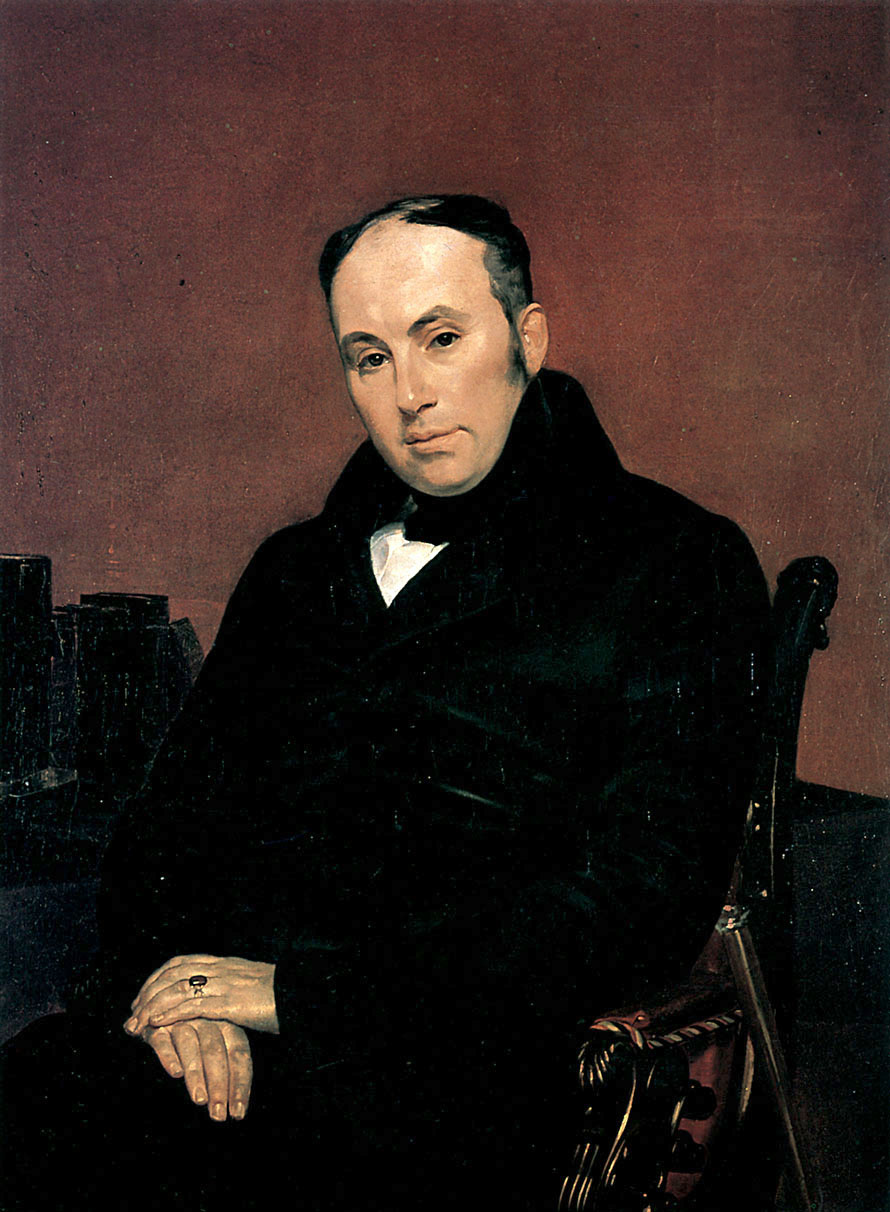
Vasily Zhukovsky

This list includes people of full and partial Turkish origin.

- Olga Semyonovna Zaplatina Aksakov, wife of Sergey Aksakov (Turkish mother)
  - children:
  - Grigory Sergeevich Aksakov, Privy Councillor (Turkish grandmother)
  - Ivan Aksakov, littérateur and notable Slavophile (Turkish grandmother)
  - Konstantin Aksakov, critic and writer (Turkish grandmother)
  - Vera Aksakova, writer known for her diaries at the time of the Crimean War (Turkish grandmother)
- Alina Boz, actress (Turkish Bulgarian father)
- Ivan Bunin,
- Vladislav Dikidzhi, Russian figure skater
- Elena Dmitrievna, Turkish captive during the Siege of Anapa; she converted to Christianity and married Mikhail Shchepkin
  - children and descendants:
  - Dmitry Mikhailovich Schepkin, philologist
  - Nikolai Mikhailovich Schepkin, publisher, teacher and public figure
    - Evgeny Nikolaevich Schepkin, historian, teacher and public figure
    - Vyacheslav Nikolaevich Shchepkin, linguist and art historian
    - Nikolai Nikolaevich Shchepkin), politician
  - Petr Mikhailovich, lawyer, assistant chairman of the Moscow District Court
    - Tatiana Shchepkina-Kupernik, writer, dramatist, poet and translator
  - Fyokla (Faina) Mikhailovna, actress
  - Alexandra Mikhailovna, actress
- Dmitry Andreevich Dril, criminologist (paternal Turkish grandmother)
- Vasily Ekimov, sculptor (works include the Bronze Horseman, the Samson Fountain, and the Monument to Minin and Pozharsky)
- Niyaz Ilyasov, judoka; medalists winner in the 2018 and 2019 World Judo Championships (Turkish Meskhetian origin)
- Strongilla Irtlach, singer and theater actress
- Tina Kandelaki, journalist, public figure, TV presenter and producer (half Turkish mother)
- Vasily Kapnist, playwright and nobleman (Turkish mother)
- Alexander Kutaisov, was an Imperial Russian military commander, a major general
- Alemdar Karamanov, composer (Turkish father)
- Maria Kexholmskaia, Turkish child adopted by Russian soldiers during the Russo-Turkish War (1877–1878); she became a nurse during World War I
- Eşref Kolçak, actor (Turkish father)
- Elizaveta Vasilievna Krupskaya, mother-in-law of Vladimir Lenin (Turkish great-grandmother)
  - children:
  - Nadezhda Krupskaya, Russian revolutionary and the wife of Vladimir Lenin
- Aishat Magomayev, actress (Turkish father)
- Muslim Magomayev, opera and pop singer (Turkish maternal grandfather)
- Sarper David Mutaf, basketball player
- Maxim Can Mutaf, basketball player (Turkish father)
- Mamedov Minur İsa Oğlu, Soviet war hero during the Great Patriotic War (Turkish Meskhetian origin)
- Konstantin Paustovsky, writer nominated for the Nobel Prize for literature in 1965 (partial Turkish origin)
- Pyotr Ivanovich Poletika, second Russian ambassador to the United States (Turkish mother)
- Ekaterina Pavlovna Rosengeim, adopted daughter of Dmitry Golitsyn (Turkish mother)
- Malik Mukhlis Ugli, educator (Turkish Meskhetian origin)
- Alexey Verstovsky, composer and musical bureaucrat (Turkish grandmother)
- Vasily Andreevich Zhukovsky, poet and a leading figure in Russian literature (Turkish mother)
  - children and descendants:
  - Alexandra Zhukovskaya, Countess of the Russian Empire (Turkish grandmother)
    - Aleksey Belevsky-Zhukovsky, Count of the Russian Empire (Turkish great-grandmother)

== See also ==
- Russia–Turkey relations
- Russians in Turkey
- Turks in the former Soviet Union
  - Turks in Armenia
  - Turks in Azerbaijan
  - Turks in Ukraine
  - Turks in Kazakhstan
- Turks in Europe
  - Turks in Finland
  - Turks in Germany
  - Turks in Poland
  - Turks in Sweden

== Notes ==
a: The 2002 census recorded 92,415 Turks and 3,257 Meskhetian Turks.
b: The 2010 census recorded 105,058 Turks and 4,825 Meskhetian Turks.

== Bibliography ==
- Akiner, Shirin (1983), Islamic Peoples of the Soviet Union, Taylor & Francis, ISBN 0-7103-0025-5.
- Aydıngün, Ayşegül; Harding, Çiğdem Balım; Hoover, Matthew; Kuznetsov, Igor; Swerdlow, Steve (2006), Meskhetian Turks: An Introduction to their History, Culture, and Resettelment Experiences (PDF), Center for Applied Linguistics, archived from the original (PDF) on 2007-07-14
- Barton, Frederick D.; Heffernan, John; Armstrong, Andrea (2002), Being Recognised as Citizens (PDF), Commission on Human Security, archived from the original (PDF) on 2011-07-17
- Bennigsen, Alexandre; Broxup, Marie (1983), The Islamic threat to the Soviet state, Taylor & Francis, ISBN 0-7099-0619-6.
- Blacklock, Denika (2005), Finding Durable Solutions for the Meskhetians, European Centre for Minority Issues
- Cornell, Svante E. (2001), Small nations and great powers: a study of ethnopolitical conflict in the Caucasus, Routledge, ISBN 0-7007-1162-7.
- Coşkun, Ufuk (2009), Ahiska/Meskhetian Turks in Tucson: An Examination of Ethnic Identity (PDF), University of Arizona, archived from the original (PDF) on 2012-01-11
- Goltz, Thomas (2009), Georgia Diary: A Chronicle of War and Political Chaos in the Post-Soviet Caucasus, M.E. Sharpe, ISBN 978-0-7656-1711-8.
- Kurbanov, Rafik Osman-Ogly; Kurbanov, Erjan Rafik-Ogly (1995), "Religion and Politics in the Caucasus", in Bourdeaux, Michael (ed.), The Politics of Religion in Russia and the New States of Eurasia, M.E. Sharpe, ISBN 1-56324-357-1.
- Ryazantsev, Sergey V. (2009), "Turkish Communities in the Russian Federation" (PDF), International Journal on Multicultural Societies, 11 (2): 155–173
- Tomlinson, Kathryn (2005), "Living Yesterday in Today and Tomorrow: Meskhetian Turks in Southern Russia", in Crossley, James G.; Karner, Christian (eds.), Writing History, Constructing Religion, Ashgate Publishing, ISBN 0-7546-5183-5.
