= Alexei Yerkhov =

Russian diplomat (born 1960)

- Алексей Ерхов
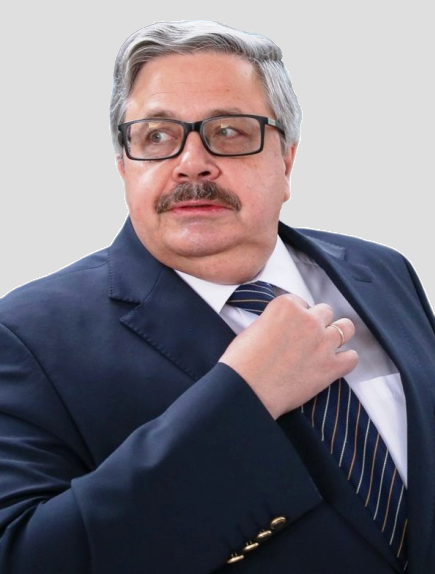
- Yerkhov in 2019

Russian Ambassador to Uzbekistan
- Incumbent
- Assumed office 5 September 2025
- President: Vladimir Putin
- Prime Minister: Mikhail Mishustin
- Preceded by: Oleg Malginov

Russian Ambassador to Turkey
- In office 19 June 2017 – 5 September 2025
- President: Vladimir Putin
- Prime Minister: Dmitry Medvedev; Mikhail Mishustin
- Preceded by: Andrei Karlov
- Succeeded by: Alexei Ivanov (Chargé d'affaires); Sergey Vershinin

Personal details
- Born: 28 October 1960 (age 65) Moscow, Russian SFSR, Soviet Union
- Spouse: Irina Nikolayevna Erhova
- Children: Elizabeth, Daria and Maria
- Education: MGIMO University
- Profession: Diplomat

Alexei Vladimirovich Yerkhov (Russian: Алексей Владимирович Ерхов; born 28 October 1960) is a Russian diplomat and is currently the Russian ambassador to Uzbekistan since September 2025. He previously served as ambassador to Turkey between 2017 and 2025.

== Early life and career ==
Yerkhov graduated from the Moscow State Institute of International Relations in 1983, in which after his graduation, he was firstly assigned as a trainee diplomat in countries such as Morocco (1983-1990) as well as Egypt (1990-1995) and only started his career as a full-time diplomat in 1996.

From 1996 to 2001, Yerkhov served as an adviser to the Russian embassy in Israel.

Between the years 2001 and 2003, Yerkhov worked in the presidential administration. He served as deputy chief and then chief of the Department of Foreign Policy Training of the Russian Federation president's control measures on foreign policy, which is headed by Sergei Prikhodko, who is currently First Deputy Head of the Russian Government Office. From 2003 until 2006, he served as minister-counselor of the Russian embassy in Syria.

Later, he was appointed as deputy director of the Secretariat of Minister of Foreign Affairs, Sergey Lavrov between 2006 and 2008.

Yerkhov served as Russian Consul General in Istanbul from 2009 to 2015.

After that, from 2015 to 2017, he headed the Department of Crisis Management Center.

On 19 June 2017, he was appointed Ambassador of the Russian Federation in Turkey, replacing the deceased Andrei Karlov. He served until 5 September 2025, when he was appointed Russian ambassador to Uzbekistan.

He holds the diplomatic rank "Extraordinary and Plenipotentiary Envoy of the First Class" (2012) and speaks English, Arabic as well as French fluently.
