= Russia–Turkey relations =

- Turkey: Russia

Diplomatic mission
- Embassy of Turkey, Moscow: Embassy of Russia, Ankara

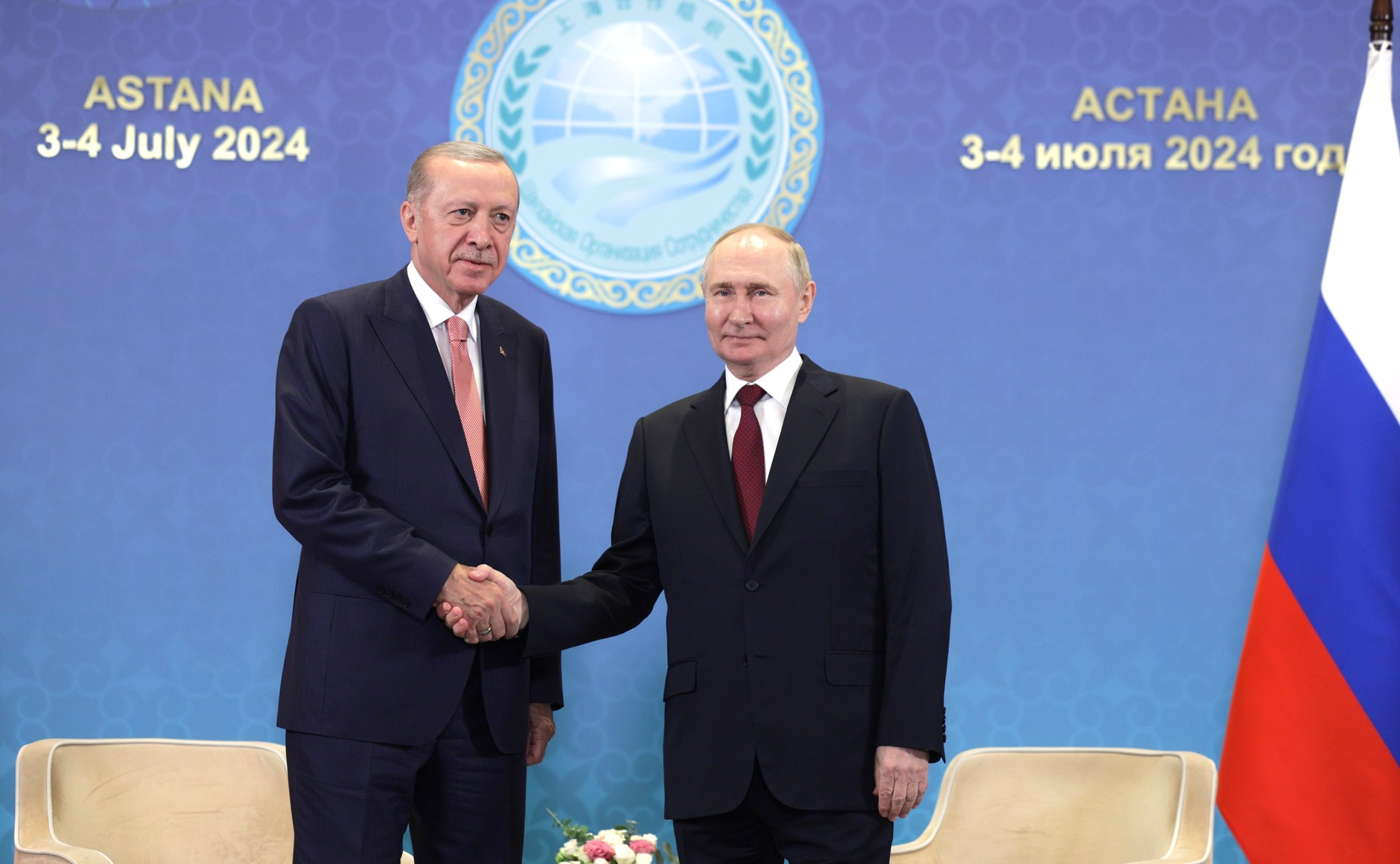
Russian President Vladimir Putin meets with Turkish President Recep Tayyip Erdoğan at the 2024 Shanghai Cooperation Organisation summit in Astana, Kazakhstan, on 3 July 2024.

Russia–Turkey relations are the bilateral relations between Russia and Turkey and their antecedent states. They are both countries with territory in Europe and Asia. Relations between the two are rather cyclical. From the late 16th until the early 20th centuries, relations between the Ottoman and Russian empires were normally adverse and hostile and the two powers were engaged in numerous Russo-Turkish wars, one of the longest series of wars in modern history. Russia attempted to extend its influence in the Balkans and gain control of the Bosphorus at the expense of the weakening Ottoman Empire. As a result, the diplomatic history between the two powers was extremely bitter and acrimonious up to World War I. However, in the early 1920s, as a result of the Bolshevik Russian government's assistance to Turkish revolutionaries during the Turkish War of Independence, the governments' relations warmed. Relations again turned sour at the end of WWII as the Soviet government laid territorial claims and demanded other concessions from Turkey. Turkey joined NATO in 1952 and placed itself within the Western alliance against the Warsaw Pact during the Cold War, when relations between the two countries were at their lowest level. Relations began to improve the following year, when the Soviet Union renounced its territorial claims after the death of Stalin.

Following the dissolution of the Soviet Union in 1991, relations between Turkey and Russia improved significantly and the two countries came to rank among each other's largest trade partners. Russia became Turkey's largest provider of energy, while many Turkish companies began to operate in Russia. In the 1990s, Turkey became the top foreign destination for Russian tourists.

However, both countries still stand on opposite ends when it comes to foreign policy, especially in tense issues such as the Syrian civil war, the Kosovo conflict, Libyan conflict, and have opposing views on the Armenian genocide and Bosnian genocide. Relations were tense following the Russian fighter jet shootdown in November 2015, becoming normalised again in 2016. As a close partner of both Russia and Ukraine, Turkey is actively attempting to broker a peaceful solution to the Russian invasion of Ukraine, and has hosted a number of high-profile negotiations between the two countries. Turkey is currently the only NATO member which is not on Russia's unfriendly countries list.

Turkey's foreign policy is marked by strategic autonomy in an era of multipolarity. Russia and Turkey have created a durable model of "cooperative rivalry": they compete militarily and geopolitically in several theaters, like Libya, Syria, while maintaining enough political and economic cooperation, for example in tourism and energy, to make the relationship beneficial for both sides, even after Russia's invasion of Ukraine.

== Early history ==
Slavic and Turkic peoples have been in contact for centuries along the Eurasian Steppe, especially the Volga. Medieval Turkic kingdoms like Khazaria, Cumania, Volga Bulgaria, the Golden Horde, the Khanate of Kazan, the Crimean Khanate, the Astrakhan Khanate and the Khanate of Sibir were established in parts of present-day Russia, with a continuing demographic, genetic, linguistic and cultural legacy.

Both early predecessors Oghuz Yabgu Khaganate even form alliance ties with East Slav principalities.

The Turks in Anatolia were separated from Russia by the Black Sea and the Polish–Lithuanian Commonwealth to the northwest and the Caucasus Mountains to the east. The Turks founded the Ottoman Empire in Anatolia and began expanding outwards, while Russia was doing the same. The two empires began a series of clashes over the Black Sea basin.

The conquest of Constantinople in 1453 by the Ottomans marked the end of the Christian Byzantine Empire, and Russia became the seat of the Eastern Orthodox Church and its rulers inherited the Byzantine legacy.

== Clashes of empires ==
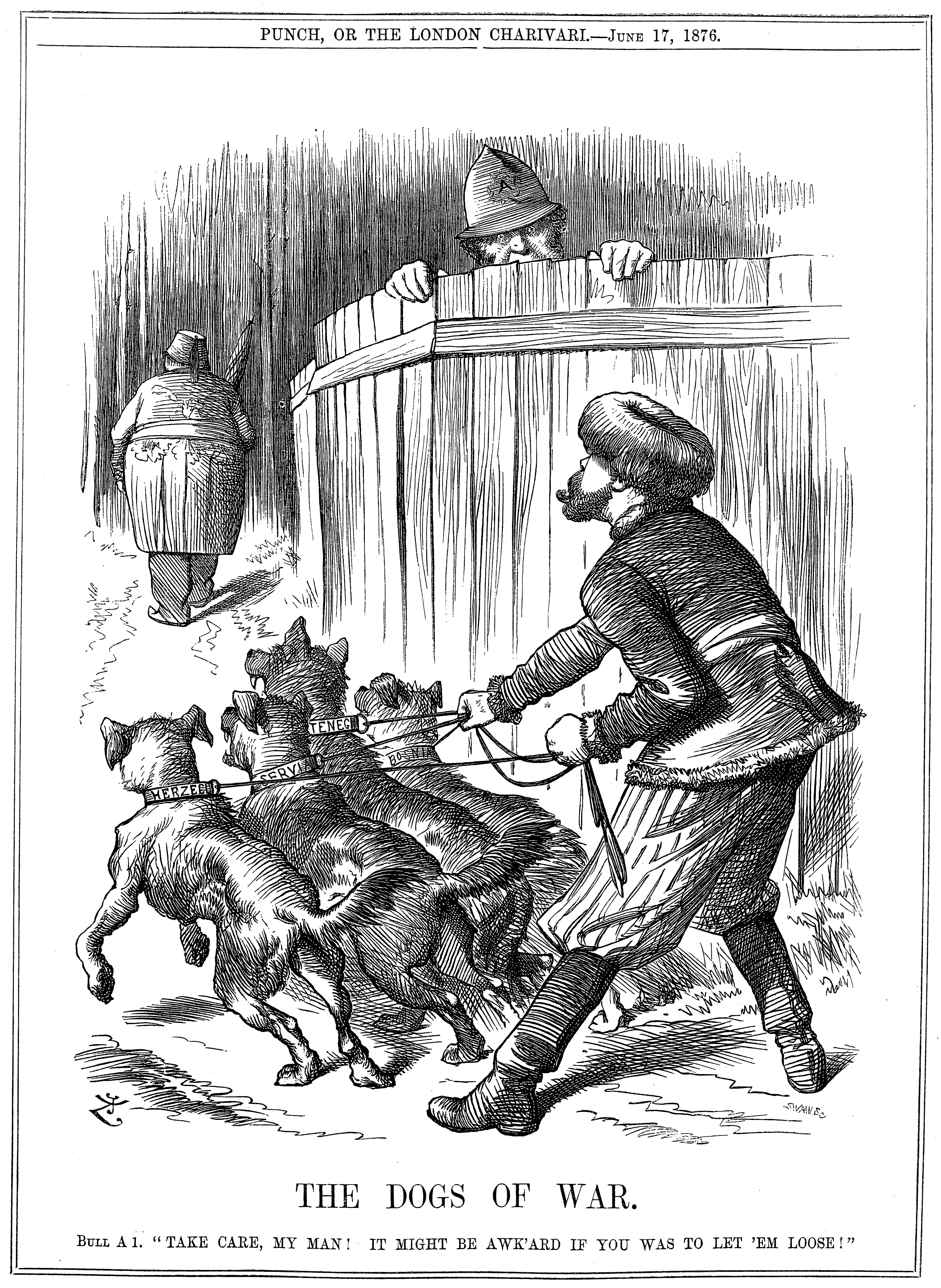
Punch cartoon from 17 June 1876. The Russian Empire preparing to let slip the Balkan "Dogs of War" to attack the Ottoman Empire, while policeman John Bull (UK) warns Russia to take care. Supported by Russia, Serbia and Montenegro declared war on the Ottoman Empire the next day. These clashes eventually triggered the Russo-Turkish War of 1877–1878.

Starting in 1549, the Ottoman Empire's support for smaller Turkic and Islamic vassal states in modern Russia (the Astrakhan Khanate, the Crimean Khanate, etc.) brought the two empires into conflict. The Black Sea was under Ottoman control when the Russians began their offensive against the Turks. In 1696, Peter the Great took Azov, but many more battles lay ahead. The Russo-Turkish War (1768–1774) resulted in the Treaty of Küçük Kaynarca in 1774. This treaty granted Russia passage to the Black Sea, making it possible for Russia to gain access to the Mediterranean Sea. It also allowed the Russians the privilege to intervene in the Ottoman Empire on behalf of the Eastern Orthodox Christian populations. By the 19th century, Russia was aiding Turkey's Slavic and Christian minorities to revolt against Ottoman rule. Russia did not always have in mind the goal of partitioning the Ottoman state, fearing this would aid the expansion plans of the Austrian Empire in the Balkan peninsula, which was largely Orthodox. Eventually, however, the desire for free passage through the Turkish straits and Pan-Slavist feeling at home pushed Russia in that direction, leading to the decisive intervention in 1877–78.

For brief moments, The Russo-Ottoman alliance was established during the turbulent years of the French Revolutionary and Napoleonic Wars. It was primarily a defensive agreement between the Russian Empire and the Ottoman Empire, designed to counterbalance the growing French influence in the region. The first treaty was signed on January 3, 1799 (attempting December 23, 1798), and included secret clauses supporting mutual defense against France. The alliance was complemented shortly after by an Anglo-Ottoman alliance, all aiming to curtail Napoleon’s expansion. The Russo-Ottoman cooperation helped end the French occupation of strategic territories like the Ionian Islands, particularly Corfu, which secured the islands from French control and led to the establishment of the Septinsular Republic under joint Russian and Turkish protectorates. This marked a rare instance of Orthodox Greek self-government since Byzantine era. However, the alliance was fragile and influenced by shifting power dynamics. After France defeated Russia in the War of the Third Coalition, the Ottoman Empire reconsidered its alliances. Sultan Selim III refused to ratify the renewed treaty in 1805, and by 1806 relations deteriorated, with Russia’s naval access blocked in the Turkish Straits. This led to renewed hostilities and the confrontation Russo-Ottoman War of 1806–1812. Another attempt is the Russo-Ottoman alliance of 1833, was an defensive agreement in which the Ottoman Empire sought Russian support against Egyptian expansion, establishing a temporary strategic partnership between two traditional rivals. During Oriental Crisis, By the late 1830s, tensions resurfaced when Muhammad Ali of Egypt again clashed with the Ottoman central authority, this time threatening Ottoman control in Syria. France supported Ali, while Britain, Austria, Prussia, and Russia formed a coalition to preserve the Ottoman Turkey’s integrity territory. Russo-Turkish relations continued until broke down, effectively ended in culminating Russian Empire and the Ottoman Empire being on opposite sides in the Crimean War.

The Russian goal of controlling the Straits and gaining access to the Mediterranean led to a determination to weaken the Ottoman Empire at every point. That meant further support of Austria against Germany, as Berlin was increasingly supportive of Constantinople. It meant Russian support for the Balkan states of Serbia, Bulgaria, Greece, and Montenegro that were fighting Turkey in a series of wars around 1910. It meant encouraging Italy to wrest control of Tripoli from the Ottomans in 1911. The crisis came in the summer of 1914 when Austria threatened Serbia and Russia decided to give all out-support to Serbia. In a matter of days that led to war between Russia and France against Germany and Austria. Britain and the Ottoman Empire joined in, and the Russian army did very poorly on the Eastern front. The two empires fought each other for the last time during World War I. The Russian Caucasus campaign started on 1 November 1914 with the Russian invasion of Turkish Armenia. In February 1917, the Russian advance was halted following the Russian Revolution. The Russian Caucasus Army soon disintegrated and was replaced by the forces of the newly established Armenian state. The war ended with the regimes of both empires being overthrown.

== Soviet Union and Turkey ==
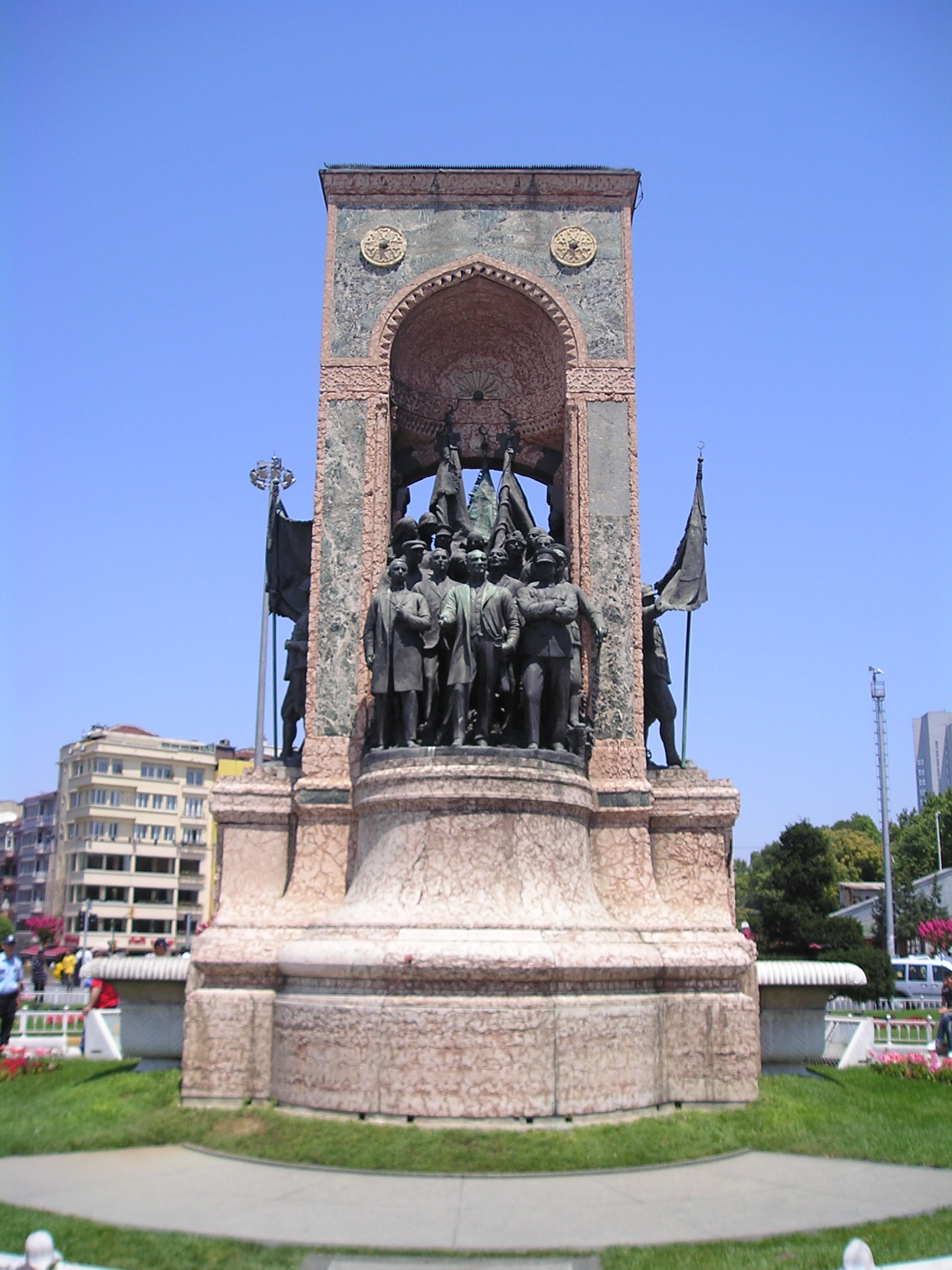
The Republic Monument (1928) at Taksim Square in Istanbul, crafted by Pietro Canonica. The people standing behind Mustafa Kemal Atatürk, founder of the Turkish Republic, include Semyon Ivanovich Aralov, Ambassador of the Russian SFSR in Ankara during the Turkish War of Independence (1919–1922). His presence in the monument, ordered by Atatürk, points out to the financial and military aid sent by Vladimir Lenin in 1920, during the war.

=== Friendship during the interbellum ===
The Soviet Union and the new Turkish governments were outsiders to the great powers and gravitated toward each other after World War I. According to Onur Işçi:

Beginning in 1920, bitterness against the postwar international order drove Soviet-Turkish relations. Nationalist Turks and internationalist Bolsheviks laid to rest four centuries of rivalry between their imperial predecessors as they found themselves in a convergence that each side defined as anti-imperialist. At the heart of their cooperation was a geopolitical alignment that sought to shield the greater Black Sea region from Western intrusions. .... All the way up to the final hours of peace in 1939, the first principle that guided Turkish diplomacy was good neighborly relations with Moscow in the context of friendship rather than subordination.

The Ottoman government signed the Treaty of Brest-Litovsk between the Bolshevik government of Russia and the Central Powers on 3 March 1918, but it became obsolete later that year. Russian Bolsheviks and the Soviet government were led by Vladimir Lenin, who emerged victorious from the Russian Civil War by 1921 and viewed the Turkish revolutionary (national) movement under the leadership of Mustafa Kemal Atatürk as congenial to their ideological and geopolitical aspirations. Lenin's government abdicated the traditional claims of the Russian Empire to the territories of Western Armenia and the Turkish straits.

The Soviet supply of gold and armaments to the Kemalists in 1920 to 1922 was a key factor in the latter's successful takeover of the Ottoman Empire, which had been defeated by the Triple Entente but won the Armenian campaign (1920) and the Greco-Turkish War (1919–1922).

The Russian Soviet Federative Socialist Republic was the first state that formally recognised the Kemalist government of Turkey in March 1921 after the Republic of Armenia which signed the Treaty of Alexandropol with the Turkish revolutionaries on 2 December 1920. The Treaty of Moscow, signed on 16 March 1921 between Lenin's government and the Grand National Assembly of Turkey government (although the Sultanate was still nominally in existence), followed bilateral treaties that the Moscow government concluded with Persia and Afghanistan earlier that year (apart from those with the states on the territory of the former Russian Empire).

Under the 1921 Treaty of Moscow, the two governments undertook to establish friendly relations between the countries. Under Article II, Turkey ceded Batum and the adjacent area north of the village of Sarp to the Georgian Soviet Socialist Republic (Kars Oblast went to Turkey). Article III instituted an autonomous Nakhchivan oblast under Soviet Azerbaijan's protectorate. Article V had the parties agree to delegate the final elaboration of the status of the Black Sea and the Turkish Straits to a future conference of delegates of the littoral states if the "full sovereignty" and security of Turkey and "her capital city of Constantinople" were not injured. The Treaty of Moscow was followed by an identical Treaty of Kars signed in October 1921 by the Kemalists with Soviet Armenia, Soviet Azerbaijan, and Soviet Georgia, which formed part of the Soviet Union after the December 1922 Treaty on the Creation of the Union of Soviet Socialist Republics.

On 16 December 1925, the Turkish government withdrew its delegation, which let the League of Nations Council grant a mandate for the disputed region of Mosul to Britain without its consent. Kemal countered the diplomatic reverse by concluding a non-aggression pact with the Soviet Union on 17 December. The pact was later amended and prolonged and then was prolonged again for another ten years on 7 November 1935. The key episode was agreement on the Montreux Convention in July 1936 in which Turkey regained control over the Straits, which it was allowed to remilitarise.

In parallel to the fluctuating bilateral relations, the communist leaders, party functionaries, diplomats and scholars paid close attention to the origins, evolution and transformational phases of Kemalism.

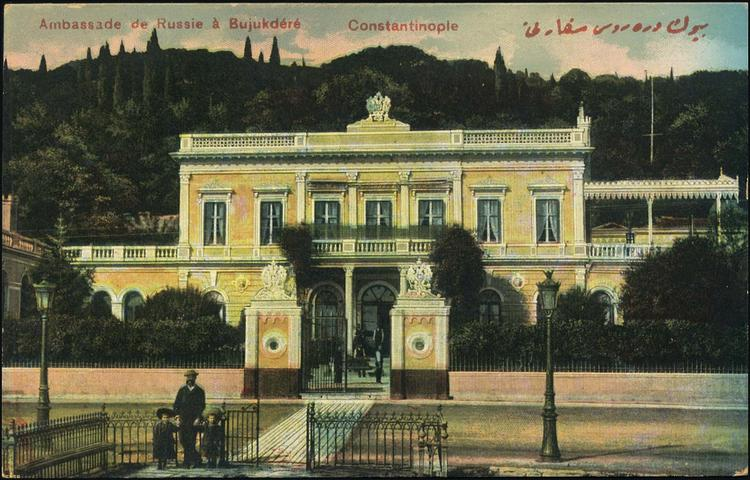
Ottoman postcard of the Russian Embassy's summer residence in the Büyükdere neighbourhood of Istanbul, on the Bosphorus. The main building of the Russian Embassy (since 1923 the Russian Consulate) is on İstiklal Avenue, in the Beyoğlu (Pera) district.

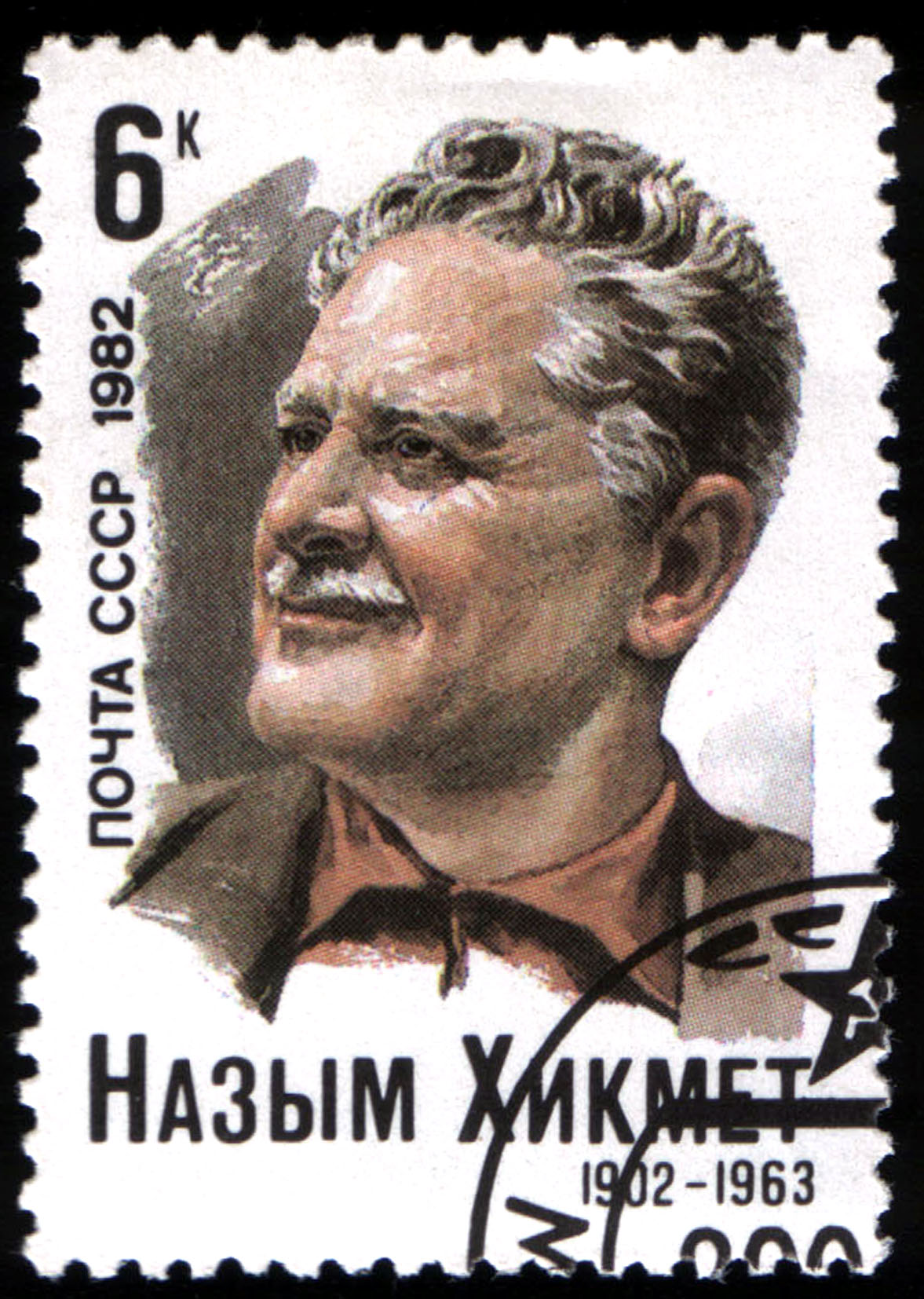
Soviet stamp of Turkish poet Nâzım Hikmet Ran, who died in Moscow and was buried at the Novodevichy Cemetery

=== World War II and postwar ===
Turkey officially remained neutral during World War II until 23 February 1945, but the Soviets viewed the Turkish continued relationship with Nazi Germany, whose warships were allowed passage through the Straits, as inimical to itself. On 19 March 1945, Soviet Foreign Minister Vyacheslav Molotov advised Turkey's ambassador in Moscow that the Soviets were unilaterally withdrawing from the 1925 Non-Aggression Pact. The decision was explained by asserting that "due to the deep changes that had occurred especially during World War II" the treaty did not cohere with "the new situation and needed serious improvement". The Turkish government was subsequently informed by Molotov that in addition to bases in the Straits, the Soviet Union also claimed a part of eastern Turkey, which was assumed to refer to the districts of Kars, Artvin and Ardahan, which the Russian Empire (and the short-lived First Republic of Armenia) had held between 1878 and 1921.

At the Potsdam Conference (July 1945), Soviet Premier Joseph Stalin demanded a revision of the Montreux Convention. The Soviets' demand to be allowed to join in the defense of the Straits was rejected by Turkey, with the backing of the West. In March 1947, with the proclamation of the Truman Doctrine, the United States underwrote the frontiers of Turkey (as well as Greece) and the continued existence of non-communist governments in the two countries. Turkey sought aid from the United States and joined NATO in 1952. The Soviet Union and Turkey were in different camps during the Korean War and throughout the Cold War.

== 1990–present ==
Following the dissolution of the Soviet Union, Russia was now a much smaller non-Communist nation. Relations improved and on 25 May 1992, a visit to Moscow by Turkish Prime Minister Süleyman Demirel saw the signing of a Russian-Turkish treaty.

Disagreements regarding the border dispute over the Caucasus and support of each other's historic adversaries both linger. However both countries are key strategic partners in the Transcaucasian region.

In May 2009, Turkish Prime Minister Recep Tayyip Erdoğan flew to Sochi, Russia for a working visit with Russian Prime Minister Vladimir Putin at which he stated, “Turkey and Russia have responsibilities in the region. We have to take steps for the peace and well-being of the region. This includes the Nagorno-Karabakh problem, the Middle East dispute, the Cyprus problem.” Putin responded that, “Russia and Turkey seek for such problems to be resolved and will facilitate this in every way,” but, “As for difficult problems from the past – and the Karabakh problem is among such issues – a compromise should be found by the participants in the conflict. Other states which help reach a compromise in this aspect can play a role of mediators and guarantors to implement the signed agreements.” Whilst on the subject of energy security, Erdoğan stated that, "The agreement on gas supplies through the so-called Western route signed in 1986 is expiring in 2012. We have agreed today to immediately start work to prolong this agreement."

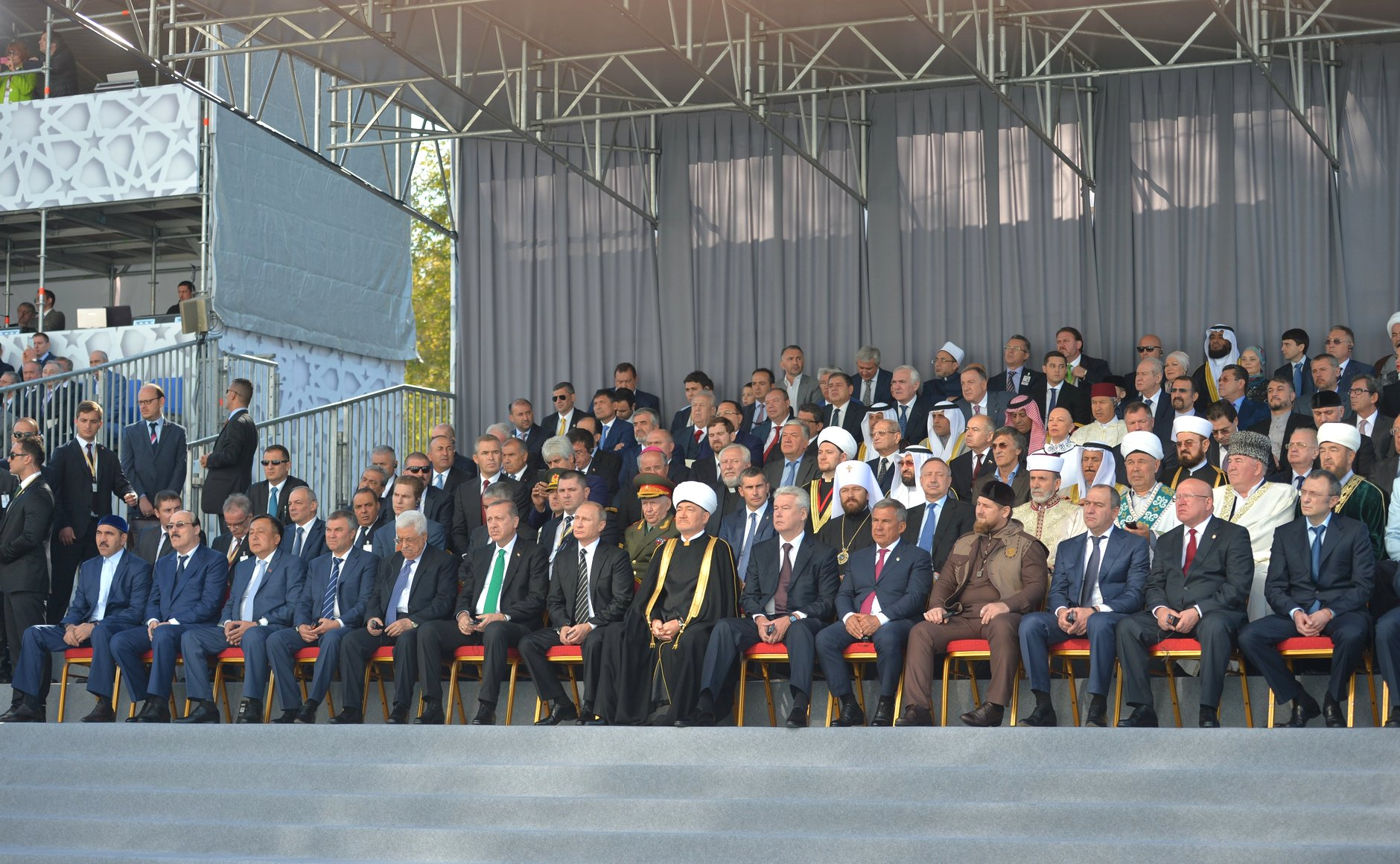
Vladimir Putin, Recep Tayyip Erdoğan, and Ramzan Kadyrov opened Moscow's Cathedral Mosque on 23 September 2015.

In May 2010, the visit by the Russian President Medvedev to Turkey saw the signing of numerous agreements, including the lifting of visa requirements. A multibillion-dollar deal was signed for the construction of the Akkuyu Nuclear Power Plant, which is expected to become Turkey's first fully operational nuclear power plant.

According to a November 2018 INR poll, 51% of Turks view Russia favorably and 43% view it unfavorably. In 2022, the independent Levada Center found that 68% of Russians have a positive attitude towards Turkey, compared to 20% who have a negative view.

=== 2015 aircraft shootdown incident ===
On 24 November 2015, within weeks of the start of the Russian military intervention in support of Syria's President Bashar al-Assad, Turkish F-16 combat aircraft shot down a Russian Sukhoi Su-24 during an airspace dispute close to the Turkish-Syrian border. Russian President Vladimir Putin described the incident as "a stab in the back by the accomplices of terrorists" and further stated that "today's tragic events will have significant consequences, including for relations between Russia and Turkey."

In response, Russia imposed a number of economic sanctions on Turkey. These included the suspension of visa-free travel to Russia for Turkish citizens, limits on Turkish residents and companies doing business in Russia, and restrictions on imports of Turkish products. Russian tour operators were discouraged from selling Turkish package holidays and asked to stop charter flights to Turkey while Russian football clubs were banned from signing Turkish players and discouraged from organizing winter training camps in Turkey. The day after the jet was shot down, a Russian lawmaker, Sergei Mironov, introduced a bill to the Russian parliament that would criminalize the denial of the Armenian genocide, a political move that Turkey has strongly opposed when countries like France and Greece adopted similar laws.

The Pan-Orthodox Council, which had been originally scheduled to be held in Istanbul's Hagia Irene in 2016, had to be shifted to Crete, Greece, after the Russian Orthodox Church indicated that it did not want to go to Turkey due to the crisis between the two countries following the downing of the Russian jet.

=== Normalisation of ties and beyond: 2016–present ===
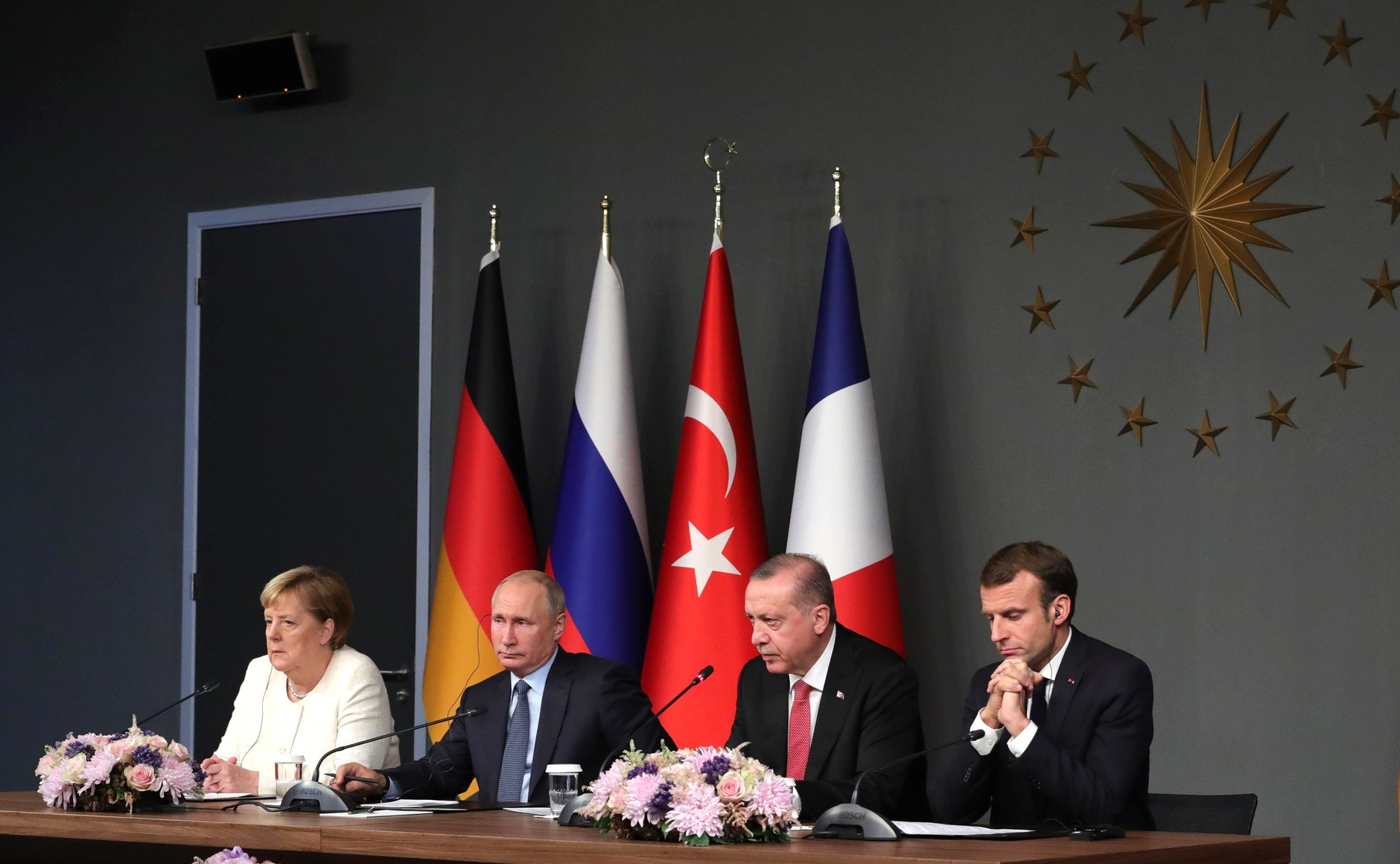
German Chancellor Angela Merkel, French President Emmanuel Macron, Turkish President Recep Tayyip Erdoğan, and Russian President Vladimir Putin, when giving a press conference as part of the Syria summit in Istanbul, Turkey

The process of normalisation of ties between the two countries was started in June 2016, with Erdoğan expressing regret to Putin for the downing of the Russian warplane. Putin and Erdoğan held a telephone conversation on 29 June, which was described as being productive by Russian and Turkish government officials. The Russian government later lifted the travel restrictions on Russian citizens visiting Turkey and ordered normalisation of trade ties.

On 9 August 2016, the countries′ leaders held a meeting in Saint Petersburg, Russia, which was described by a commentator as a ″clear-the-air summit″ — the first time the pair met since the fallout over the downing of a Russian fighter jet by the Turkish air force, as well as Erdoğan's first trip abroad since the 2016 Turkish coup attempt. The BBC commented that the summit, at which Erdoğan thanked Putin for his swift support during the coup attempt, ″unnerved the West″.

Following the assassination of the Russian ambassador to Turkey, Andrei Karlov, on 19 December 2016, the countries′ leaders sought to contain any possible damage to relations between the two countries. In December 2016, the two countries initiated the Astana peace talks on Syria peace settlement, subsequently, along with Iran, agreeing to create de-escalation zones in Syria.

On 9 February 2017, a Russian air strike in Syria killed three Turkish soldiers by mistake.

On 31 May 2017, Russia lifted most of the sanctions it had imposed on Turkey, which included lifting restrictions on Turkish companies operating in Russia and ending a ban on employing Turkish workers in the country. It also ended an embargo on a range of Turkish imports. President Putin also restored a bilateral agreement on visa-free movement between the two countries.

During Putin's visit to Ankara at the end of September 2017, the Turkish and Russian presidents said they agreed to closely cooperate on ending Syria's civil war. Vladimir Putin's visit to Ankara in December that year was the third face-to-face meeting between the countries′ leaders in less than a month and their seventh in a year.

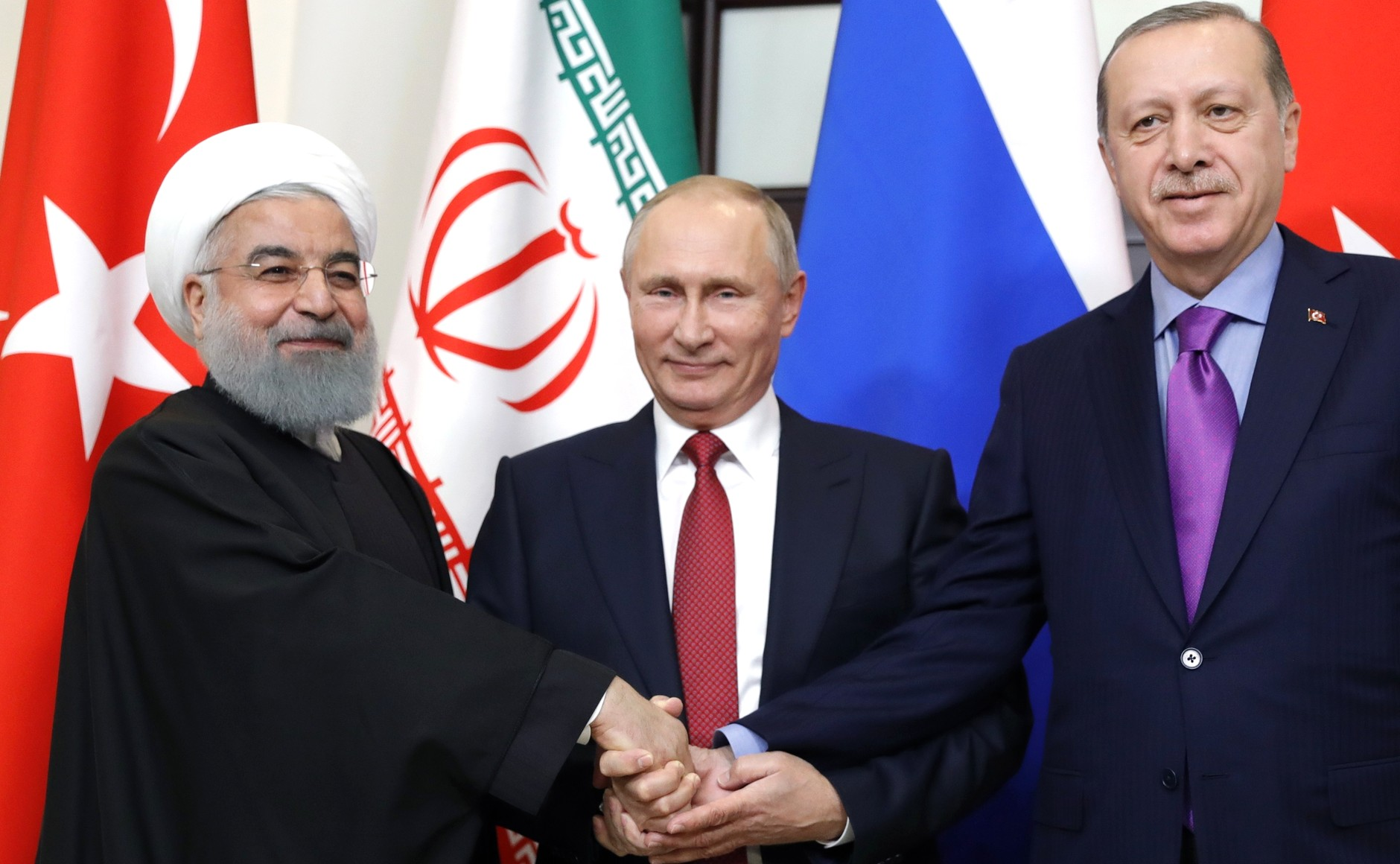
Russian President Vladimir Putin, Iranian President Hassan Rouhani, and Turkish President Recep Tayyip Erdoğan in November 2017

In 2018, Russia criticized the Turkish invasion of northern Syria aimed at ousting U.S.-backed Syrian Kurds from the enclave of Afrin.

In June 2018, the Russian government-controlled news agency Sputnik shut down its website in the Kurdish language without mentioning any particular reason for the decision. Former employees of Sputnik said that the news agency decided to shut it down at Turkey's request.

In mid-August 2018, Russia and Turkey backed one another in their respective disputes with the United States. Russia condemned U.S. sanctions against Turkey over the detention of Andrew Brunson, while Turkey stated its opposition to U.S. sanctions on Russia over the annexation of Crimea and interference in the 2016 U.S. elections.

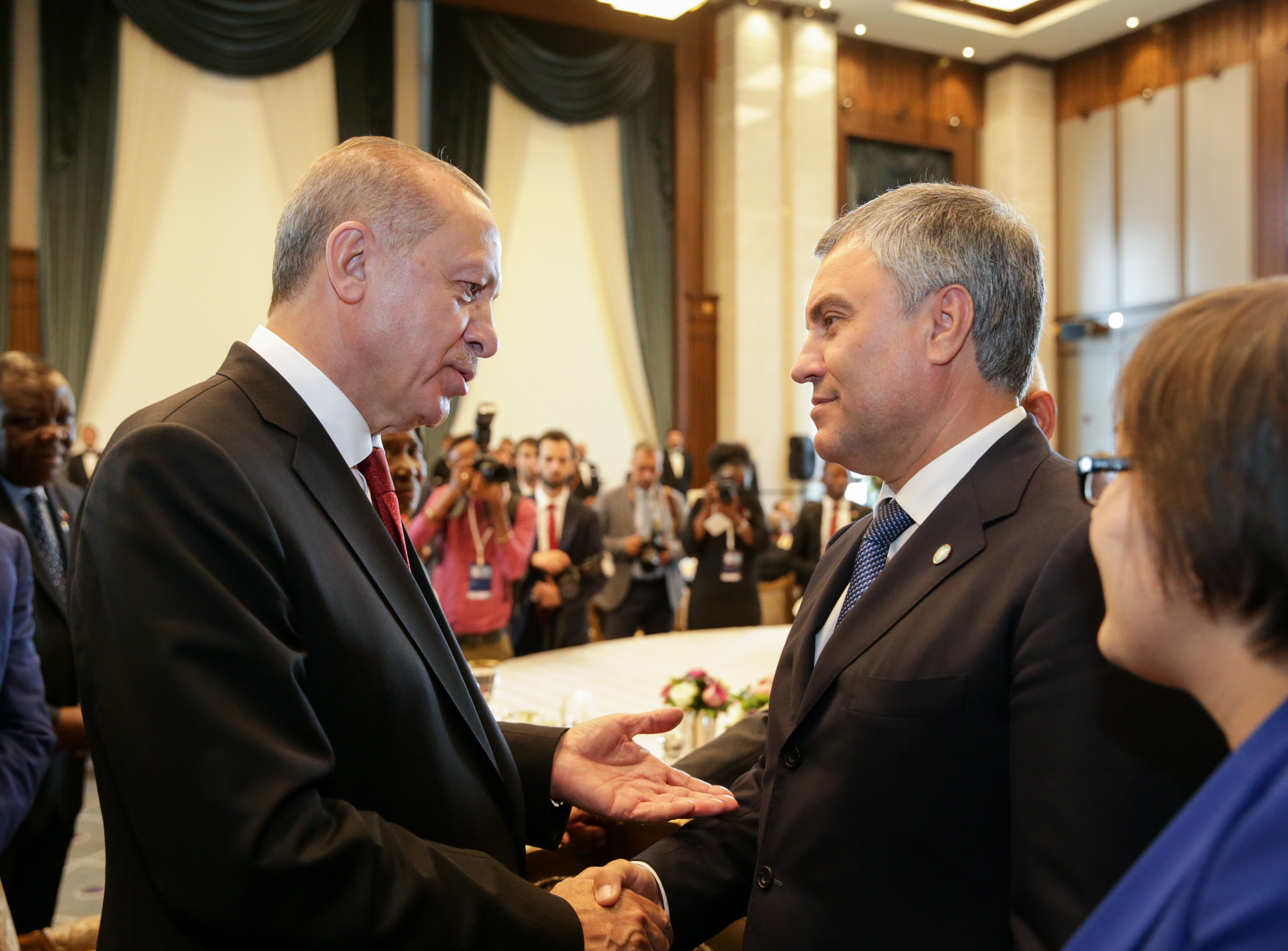
State Duma Speaker Vyacheslav Volodin and Turkish President Erdoğan on 18 August 2018

In addition, Turkey and Russia also shared a common foreign policy on the Venezuelan presidential crisis in January 2019, supporting the regime of Nicolás Maduro as the legitimate government of Venezuela, while opposing the Western-supported opposition government led by Juan Guaidó.

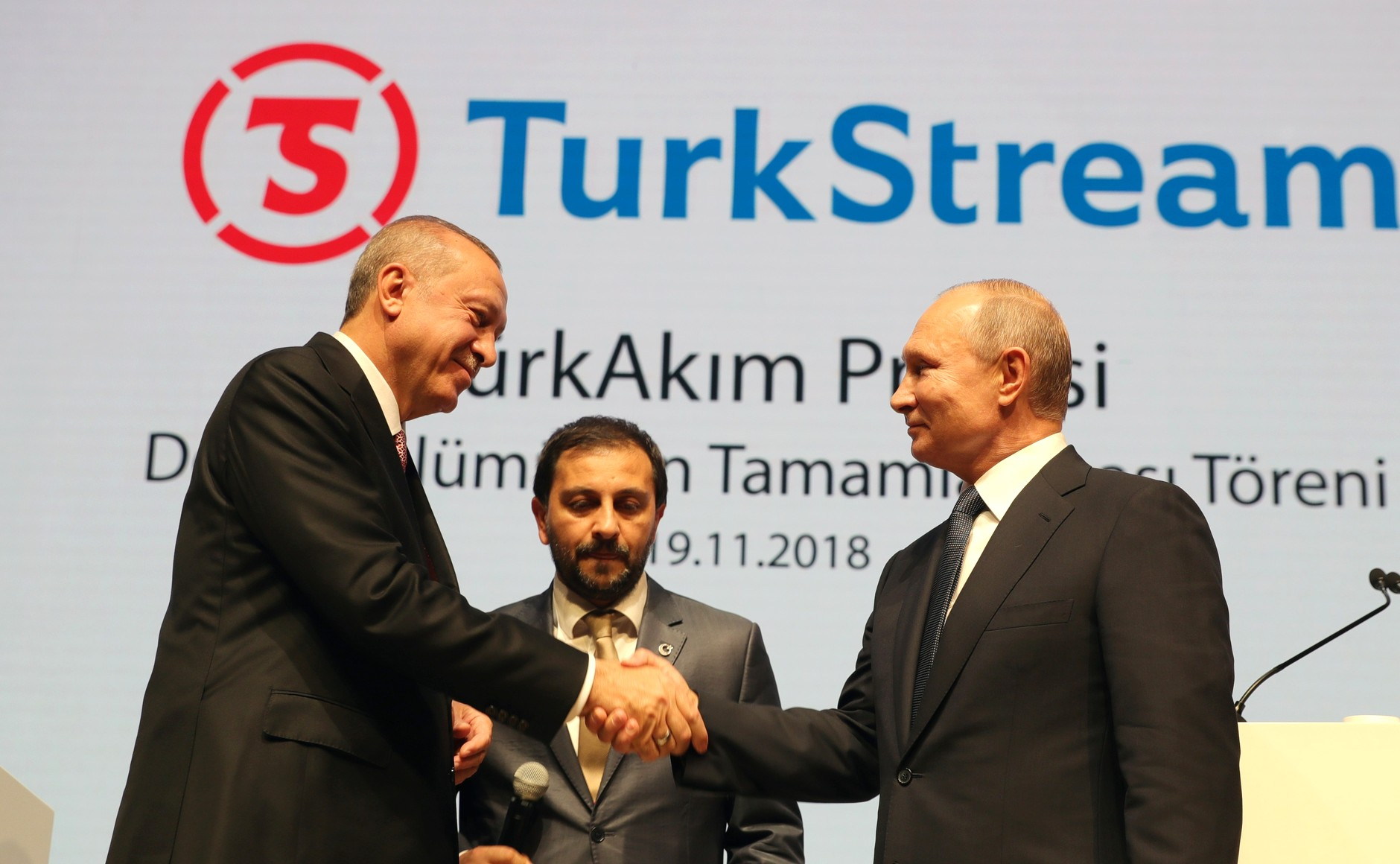
Erdoğan and Putin at the opening ceremony of the TurkStream pipeline in Istanbul on 19 November 2018

Turkish foreign minister Mevlüt Çavuşoğlu stated that Turkey was not going to have to choose between Russia and the United States.

Russian President Vladimir Putin initially expressed comparative neutrality to the 2019 Turkish offensive into northeastern Syria, stating that Turkey has a right to defend itself, but called upon foreign militaries with what he described as an illegal presence in Syria to leave. On 15 October, Putin declared a much harsher stance, denouncing the Turkish invasion as 'unacceptable' and deploying Russian troops to the frontline. On 13 November, Russian Foreign Minister Lavrov stated that the US pushed Gulf countries to finance the creation of a quasi-state on the Eastern Euphrates.

On 1 October 2020, Turkey issued a statement dismissing the joint demands from France, Russia, and the United States calling for a ceasefire in the Second Nagorno-Karabakh War between Armenia and Azerbaijan.

On 19 March 2021, Turkish President Recep Tayyip Erdoğan criticized Joe Biden for calling Russian President Vladimir Putin a killer. According to Erdoğan, Putin gave a very smart and graceful response.

Russia has expressed support for the normalization of Armenia–Turkey relations for regional stability.

In March 2022, Turkey expressed its hopes that Russia would not adopt a negative stance amid talks to resurrect the 2015 Iran nuclear deal, which were halted due to a last-minute demand by Moscow, according to Foreign Minister Mevlut Cavusoglu.

On 2 June 2022, Russia's Foreign Ministry spokeswoman Maria Zakharova warned that Turkey's invasion of northern Syria "would be a direct violation of Syria’s sovereignty and territorial integrity" and would "cause a further escalation of tensions in Syria."

In February 2024, President Erdoğan and members of the Turkish government declined to comment on the death of Russian opposition leader and political prisoner Alexei Navalny. The Turkish authorities in Istanbul did not allow a gathering of Russians in exile to honor Navalny. Navalny was a controversial figure due to his previous Islamophobic and racist views towards Central Asians.

==== Russian invasion of Ukraine ====
On 3 February 2022, President Recep Tayyip Erdoğan of Turkey volunteered to organize a Ukraine-Russia conference during a visit to Ukraine, as EU leaders increased up outreach to the Kremlin to calm worries of a Russian invasion. On 24 February, after the invasion started, Erdoğan expressed his support for Ukraine. On 25 February, on the other hand, the Republic of Turkey abstained from voting on Russia's suspension from the Council of Europe, as it calls for open dialogue between the parties under any circumstances. Turkish Foreign Minister Mevlut Cavusoglu also reiterated Turkey's "readiness to host negotiations that could take place between the Russian Federation and Ukraine," accordingly.

On 27 February 2022, Cavusoglu stated that Turkey shifted its terminology to refer to Russia's assault on Ukraine as a "war," and committed to enforce elements of the 1936 Montreux Convention's international pact which allows Turkey to prohibit all warships of the belligerent forces, including those of the Russian navy, from entering the Bosporus and Dardanelles and thus hinder Russian vessels' transit from the Mediterranean to the Black Sea. On 28 February, President Erdoğan publicly confirmed that the straits would be closed to prevent an escalation of the war, while also pledging to maintain relations with both Ukraine and Russia. On 10 March, Messrs Sergei Lavrov and Dmytro Kuleba, the top diplomats of the Russian Federation and of Ukraine, have personally met in the Mediterranean province of Antalya in Turkey in the first high-level contact between the two sides since the beginning of the skirmishes in April. The meeting between Lavrov and Kuleba took place on the sidelines of a significant diplomacy forum gathering professionals who deal with diplomacy, such as political leaders, diplomats, opinion makers, authors, and academics. Turkish Foreign Minister Mevlut Cavusoglu also participated. Mr Cavusoglu has said the aim of the diplomatic meeting is "to pave the way" for a meeting between the Russian and Ukrainian presidents, which would be facilitated by Turkey's president.

Turkey has been actively involved in mediation efforts in the Russian invasion of Ukraine due to its important relations with both countries. Ukraine has asked both Israel and Turkey to set up talks with Russia for negotiations.

Turkey has provided Ukraine with Bayraktar drones since 2019, which played a significant role in deterring Russian advances in the early stages of the 2022 Russian invasion of Ukraine; however, it has broken ranks with all the other NATO member states by continuously refusing to impose sanctions on Russia for its aggression and occupation of Ukraine.

On 17 March 2022, Turkish Foreign Minister Mevlut Cavusoglu expressed hope for a humanitarian ceasefire in the southern Ukrainian port city of Mariupol, where he claimed more than 100 Turkish citizens remained.

On 20 March 2022, Turkey's foreign minister stated that Russia and Ukraine were close to reaching an agreement on "important" issues, and that he hoped for a ceasefire if the two sides did not reverse their previous advances.

In February 2024, the European Union proposed the imposition of sanctions that would target a Turkish company aiding Russia's war effort in Ukraine.

Turkey has also begun to stop buying Russian oil to comply with Western sanctions; however, Turkey has, even after four years of Russian full-scale military invasion and occupation of Ukraine, continuously refused to impose any sanctions against Russia, being the only NATO member state that has not done so. Meanwhile, Russia has criticised Turkey for supplying weapons to Ukraine on several occasions, even if it acts as a mediator.

On 22 October 2025, the United States imposed sanctions against Russia's largest oil companies, Rosneft and Lukoil. The U.S. also threatened secondary sanctions against foreign financial institutions and companies that continue to do business with Rosneft and Lukoil, which would affect their customers in Turkey.

==== Black Sea Grain Initiative ====
On 17 July 2022, Russian, Ukrainian, and Turkish military delegations met with United Nations officials in Istanbul to start talks on the resumption of exports of Ukrainian grain from the Black Sea port of Odesa. On 22 July 2022, Russian and Ukrainian officials signed the deal to allow grain exports from Ukrainian Black Sea ports. Under the agreement, a coalition of Turkish, Ukrainian, and UN staff will monitor the loading of grain into vessels in Ukrainian ports, to allay Russian fears of weapons smuggling before navigating a preplanned route through the Black Sea, which remains heavily mined by Ukrainian and Russian forces. On 29 October 2022, Russia said it was suspending its participation in the grain deal, in response to what it called a major Ukrainian drone attack on its Black Sea fleet at the Crimean naval port of Sevastopol. On 1 November 2022, Russian President Vladimir Putin said that Russia would consider resuming the grain deal after the completion of an investigation into the drone attacks. On 2 November 2022, Russia announced that it would resume its participation in the initiative.

MV AYA incident

On 13 September 2024 it was reported that the Turkish vessel MV AYA was struck by a Russian Kh-22 missile around 23:05 on 11 September while near Romanian waters, in the exclusive economic zone of Romania, 55 km from Sfântu Gheorghe, Tulcea, 75km (46 miles) south of Zmiinyi Island, near the mouth of the Danube. Ukrainian President Volodymyr Zelenskyy accused Russia of the missile attack. The 26,550-ton cargo of wheat was on its way to Egypt on the vessel, which was registered in Saint Kitts and Nevis and owned in Belize. One report said the vessel was operated by a Turkish firm. The origin was Chornomorsk. The incident occurred the very night that President Erdogan called in a strongly-worded communiqué for the return of Crimea from the Russian aggressor to Ukraine. The Russian side, of course, denied Turkish and Ukrainian claims of perpetrating the attack, while rejecting Turkey's calls to cede control over Crimea back to Ukraine.

== Economic relations ==
The first direct gas pipeline between Russia and Turkey under the Black Sea was Blue Stream, which was commissioned in 2005. The TurkStream pipeline also connects Russia and Turkey under the Black Sea.

In order to contribute to Turkey’s economic development, contracts have been concluded with Russia for the construction of the Akkuyu nuclear power plant and the TurkStream gas pipeline.

On 12 May 2010, the government of the Russian Federation and the republic of Turkey signed a Cooperation Agreement providing for the construction of Akkuyu nuclear power plant, comprising four power units with VVER-1200 reactors with a total capacity of 4800 MW on the southern coast of Turkey in Mersin province.

In October 2016, an intergovernmental agreement for TurkStream was signed. Construction began in May 2017, and gas deliveries to Bulgaria through the pipeline began on 1 January 2020. TurkStream changes the regional gas flows in South-East Europe by diverting the transit through Ukraine and the Trans Balkan Pipeline system.

In 2022, Turkish President Recep Tayyip Erdoğan stated that Turkey would not join the international sanctions on Russia, citing the country's import dependency as a reason. Turkey received almost half of its gas from Russia. Erdoğan and Putin planned for Turkey to become an energy hub for all of Europe. According to Aura Săbăduș, a senior energy journalist focusing on the Black Sea region, "Turkey would accumulate gas from various producers — Russia, Iran, and Azerbaijan, [liquefied natural gas] and its own Black Sea gas — and then whitewash it and relabel it as Turkish. European buyers wouldn’t know the origin of the gas."

In September 2024, Turkey announced that it had submitted a request to join the BRICS, an intergovernmental organization of countries with major emerging markets. However, the Turkish application for full membership in the organization eventually failed to receive sufficient support from its founding members, with several reports indicating that the country's accession was turned down by India, which has often had strained relations with Turkey due to Erdogan's close ties with Pakistan (India's main adversary). Consequently, Turkey was designated merely as a “partner state” within BRICS.

== Military relations ==
On 12 September 2017, Turkey announced that it had signed a deal to purchase the Russian S-400 surface-to-air missile system; the deal was characterised by American press as ″the clearest sign of [Recep Erdoğan]′s pivot toward Russia and away from NATO and the West" that ″cements a recent rapprochement with Russia″. Despite pressure to cancel the deal on the part of the Trump administration, in April 2018, the scheduled delivery of the S-400 batteries had been brought forward from the first quarter of 2020 to July 2019. The sensitive information related to the F-35's stealth profile and other components being shared with Russia from the S-400's radar and sensor systems is seen by Washington as the hazard in the military trade between Russia and Turkey.

In September 2019, Russia sent its fourth-generation fighter aircraft, Sukhoi Su-35, and its fifth-generation stealth fighter aircraft, Sukhoi Su-57, to Turkey for Teknofest İstanbul 2019. The jets landed at Turkey's Atatürk Airport, only some weeks after Turkish President Recep Tayyip Erdoğan had paid an official visit to Moscow, where he discussed the possibility of purchasing Russia's stealth combat aircraft with Vladimir Putin.

In November 2021, Russia offered assistance to Turkey in developing the country's new-generation fighter. Some Turkish officials have also shown interest in buying Russian jets if the US F-16 deal fails.

In 2024, Washington warned Turkey of potential consequences if it did not reduce exports of US military-linked hardware to Russia, critical for Moscow's war efforts. Assistant Commerce Secretary Matthew Axelrod met Turkish officials to halt this trade, emphasizing the need to curb the flow of American-origin components vital to Russia's military. The issue strained NATO relations, as Turkey increased trade with Russia despite US and EU sanctions since Russia's 2022 invasion of Ukraine. Axelrod urged Turkey to enforce a ban on transshipping US items to Russia, warning that Moscow was exploiting Turkey's trade policy. Despite a rise in Turkey's exports of military-linked goods to Russia and intermediaries, there was no corresponding increase in reported imports in those destinations, suggesting a "ghost trade."

== Resident diplomatic missions ==
- Russia has an embassy in Ankara and consulates-general in Istanbul, Antalya, and Trabzon.
- Turkey has an embassy in Moscow and consulates-general in Saint Petersburg, Kazan, and Krasnodar.
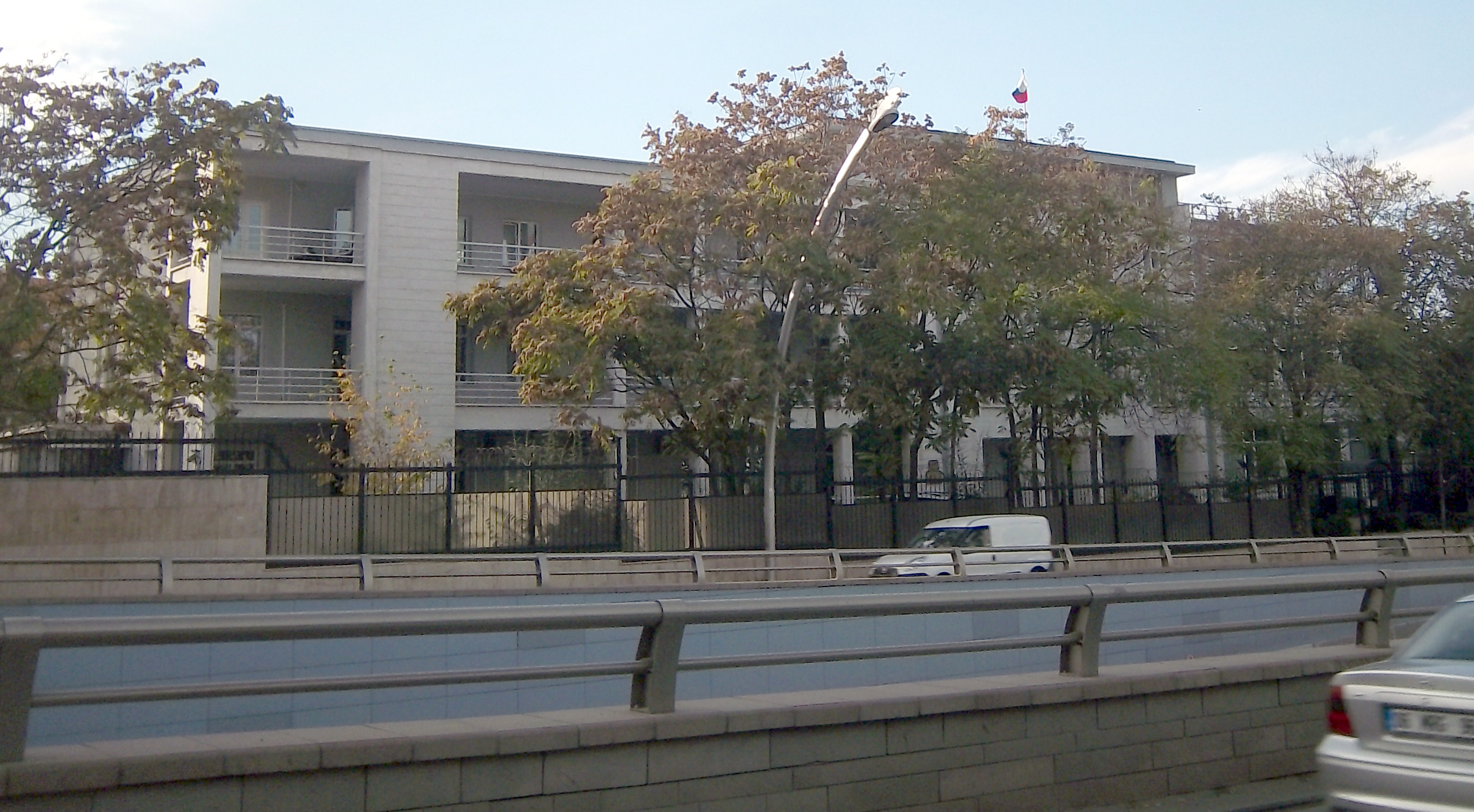
Embassy of Russia in Ankara

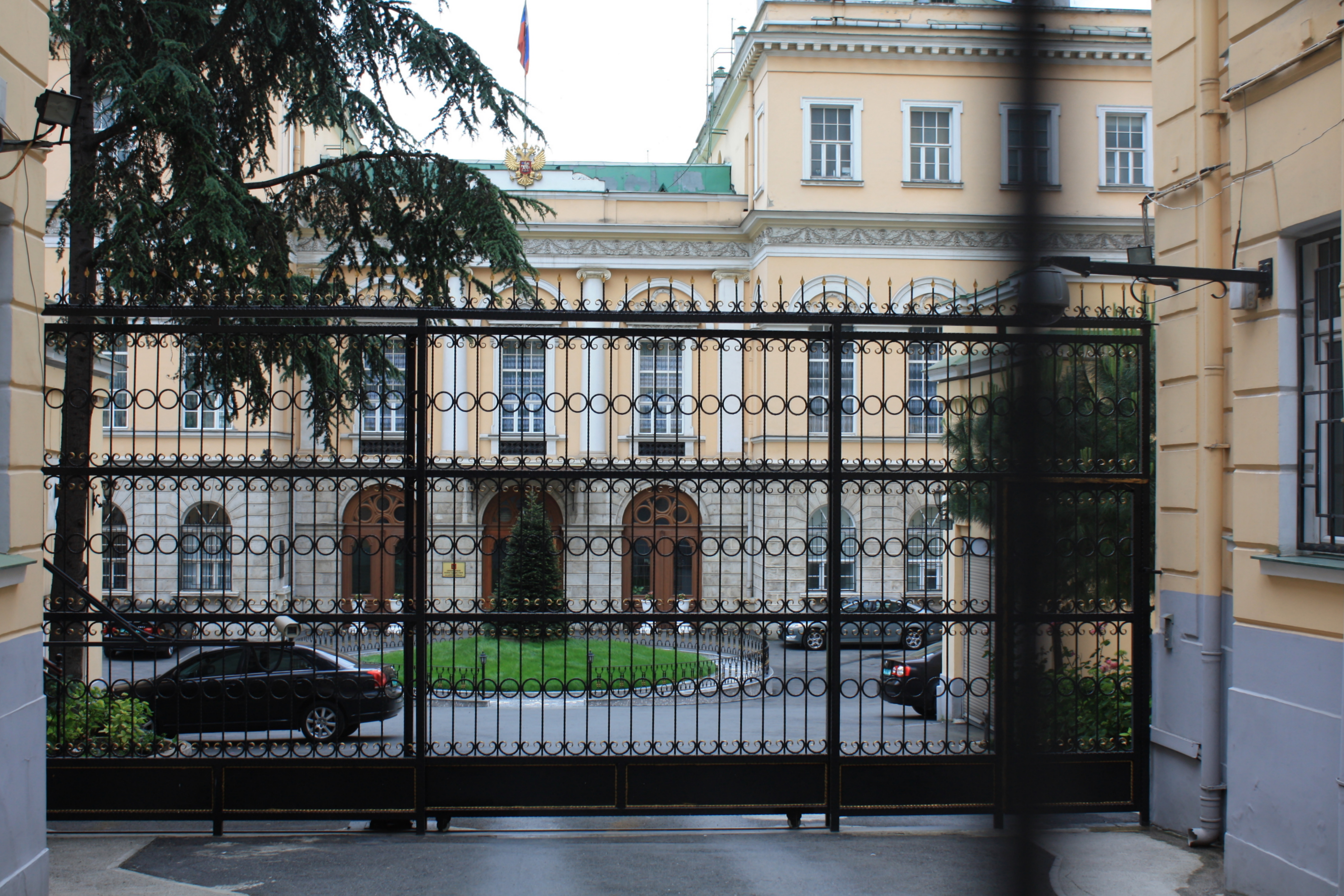
Consulate-General of Russia in Istanbul

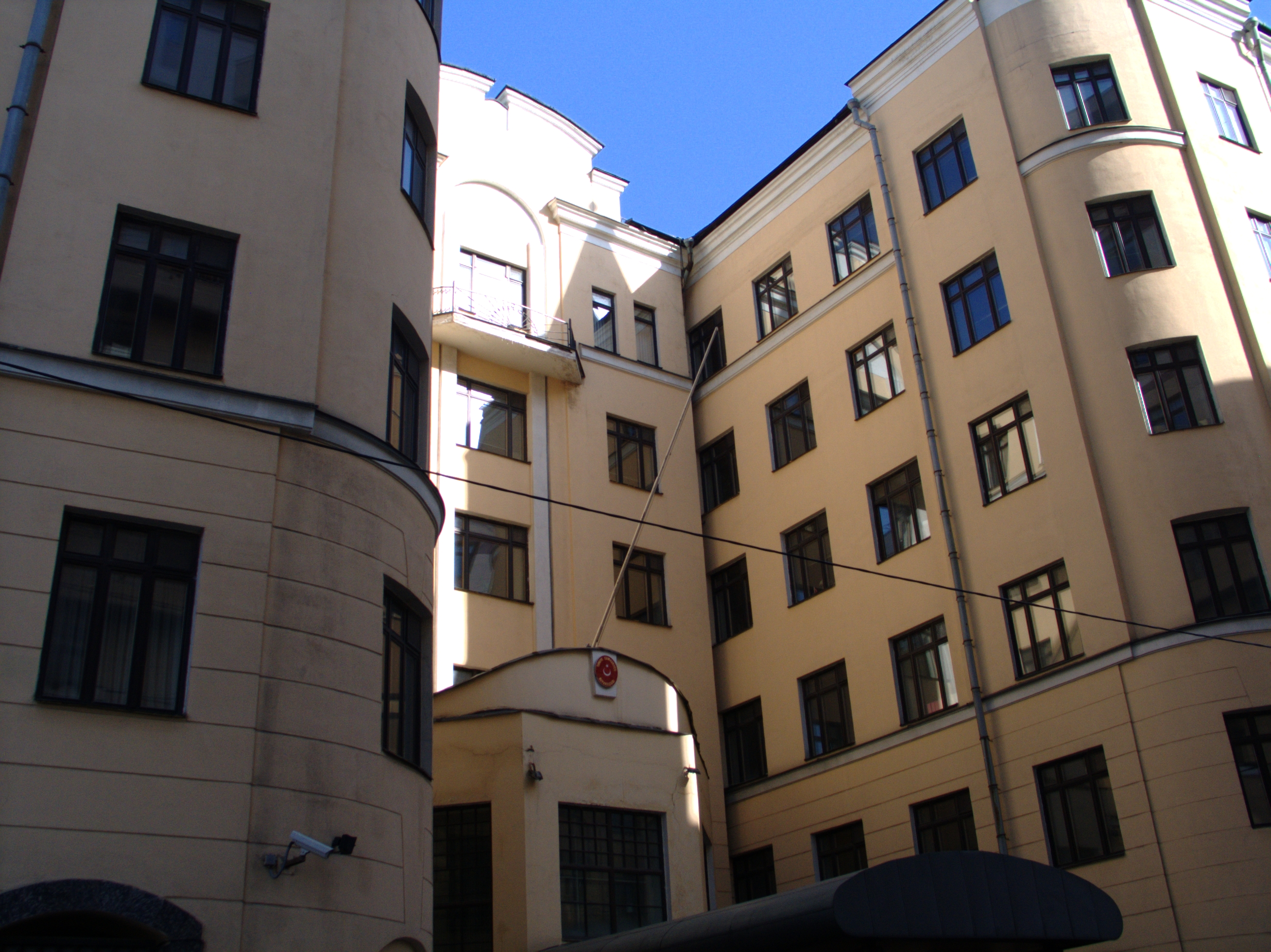
Embassy of Turkey in Moscow

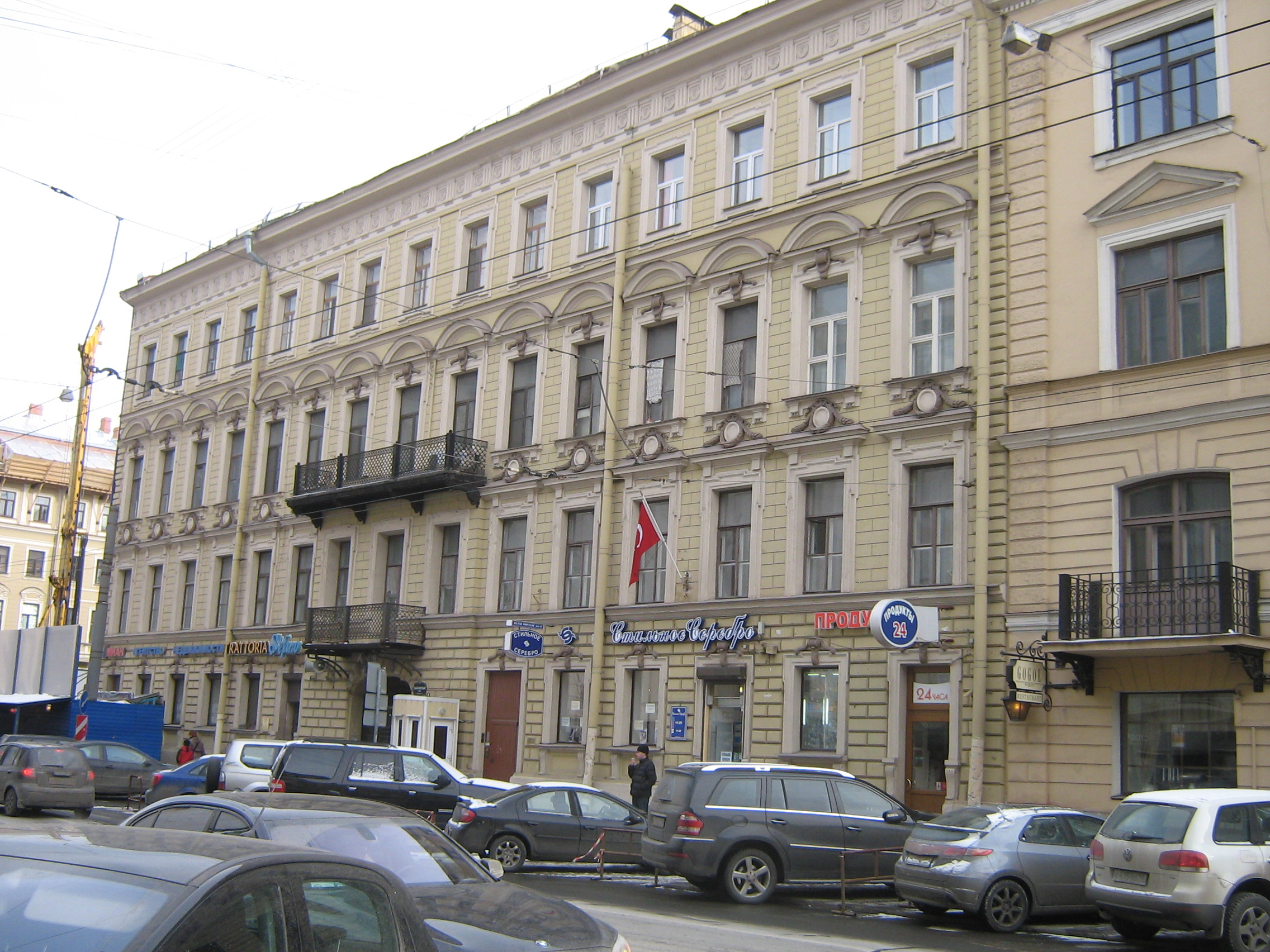
Consulate-General of Turkey in Saint Petersburg

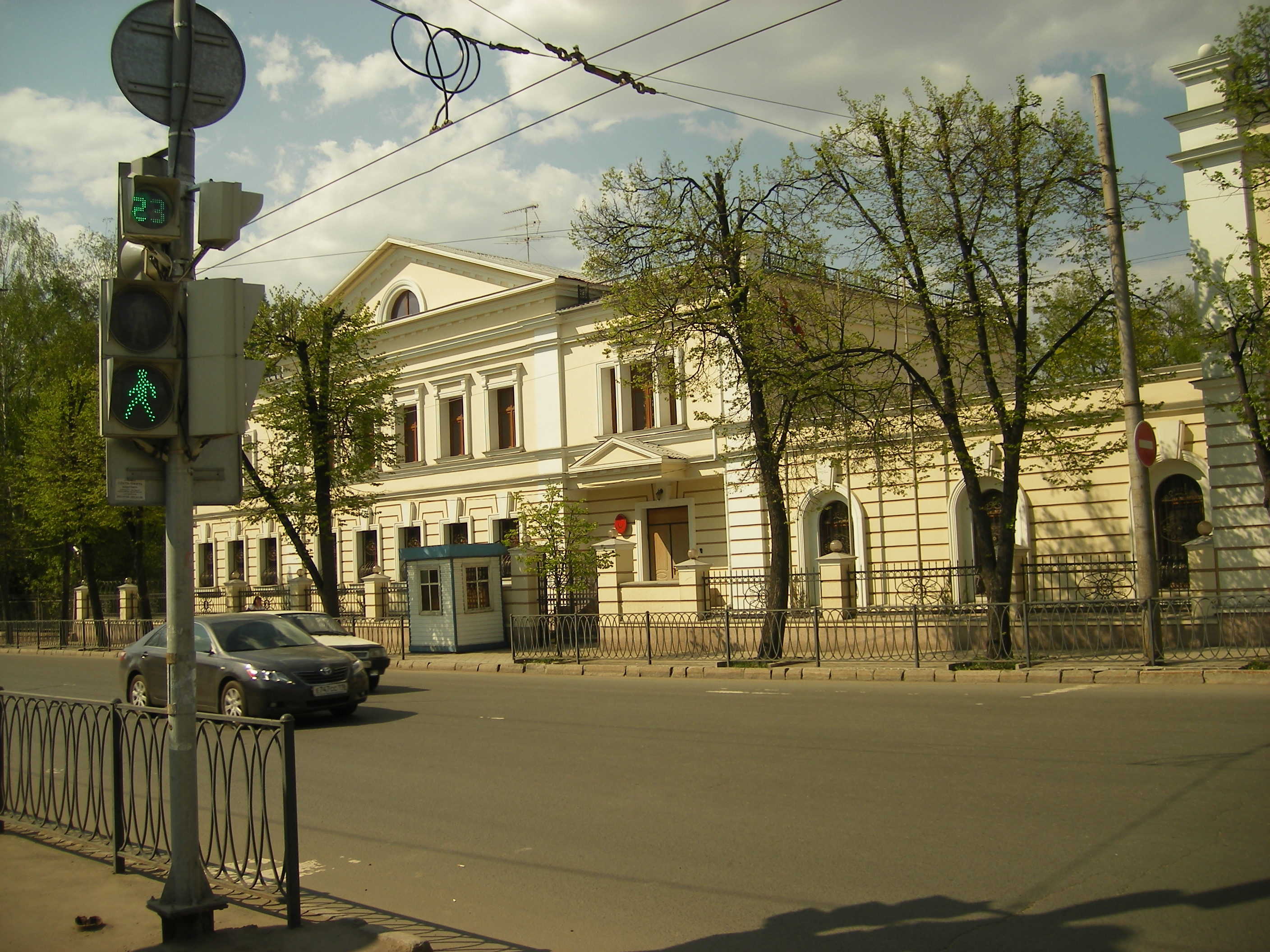
Consulate-General of Turkey in Kazan

== See also ==
- Eastern Question, on weakening role of Ottoman Empire
- Incirlik Air Base
- List of ambassadors of Turkey to Russia
- Russian Palace, Istanbul
- Russians in Turkey
- Turkey–European Union relations
- Turkey in NATO
- Turkey–United States relations
- Turks in Russia
- Soviet Union–Turkey relations
