= Russian foreign policy in the Middle East =

Russia has relations with all of the countries of the Middle East. Historically it has been involved in numerous wars there, especially with Turkey and the Ottoman Empire, with Afghanistan, and recently in support of Syria. Today, when the Russian political establishment deals with Middle Eastern countries it seems to act a lot like it did in imperial times – often giving them broad diplomatic and even military support.

== See also ==
- Afghanistan–Russia relations
  - Soviet–Afghan War
- Armenia–Russia relations
- Bahrain–Russia relations
- Caucasian War
  - Russian conquest of the Caucasus
- Cold War in Asia (the regional aspect of the Cold War)
  - Soviet Middle Eastern foreign policy during the Cold War
- Crimean War
  - Crimean Khanate
  - Russo-Crimean Wars
- Eastern Question, on the decline of the Ottoman Empire
  - Russo-Turkish wars
    - Russo-Turkish War (1806–1812)
    - Russo-Turkish War (1828–1829)
    - Caucasus campaign
- Egypt–Russia relations
- Georgia–Russia relations
- Great Game, the rivalry between Britain and Russia over Central Asia in the 19th century
- Iran–Russia relations
  - Russia and the Iran–Israel proxy conflict
- Israel–Russia relations
- Iraq–Russia relations
- Jordan–Russia relations
- Kuwait–Russia relations
- Lebanon–Russia relations
- Libya–Russia relations
- Oman–Russia relations
- Qatar–Russia relations
- Palestine–Russia relations
- Russo-Persian Wars
  - Russo-Persian War (1722–1723)
  - Persian expedition of 1796
  - Russo-Persian War (1826–1828)
- Russia–Saudi Arabia relations
  - 2020 Russia–Saudi Arabia oil price war
- Russia–Syria relations
  - Russian intervention in the Syrian Civil War
- Russia–Turkey relations
  - Russians in Turkey
  - Turks in Russia
- Russia–United Arab Emirates relations
- Russia–Yemen relations
- List of modern conflicts in the Middle East
- Foreign policy of the Russian Empire
