= Soviet foreign policy in the Middle East =

Activities and objectives of the Soviet Union in the Middle East

Soviet foreign policy in the Middle East was shaped by two primary concerns, as perceived by the Soviet leadership. The first priority was ensuring the security interests of the Soviet Union itself, mainly by countering American presence in the region. The second concern involved the ideological struggle between communism and capitalism. During the Cold War, the USSR first maintained a proactive foreign policy in the Middle East as a whole in the mid-1950s. The rise of Arab Nationalism, which was a highly anti-Western movement, enabled the Soviet Union to form alliances with various Arab leaders, a notable example being Gamal Abdel Nasser of Egypt. In order to sustain its sphere of influence in the region, the USSR provided military and economic assistance to pro-Soviet states and exploited regional conflicts and rivalries, such as between Arab states and Israel, to its advantage. The collapse of the Soviet Union in 1991 would result in a power vacuum in the Middle East and contributed to the rise of American hegemony in the region.

== Background ==
=== Before and during World War II ===
Prior to World War Two and the following Cold War, Soviet foreign policy in the Middle East was mainly concerned with the Northern Tier countries consisting of Turkey, Iraq, Pakistan, and Iran in particular. The USSR had, together with United Kingdom, long been involved in a competition for influence in Iran which culminated in the Anglo-Soviet invasion of the country in 1941. After the conclusion of the Second World War, Soviet foreign policy in the region was initially characterised by a limited level of engagement. Instead, Stalin's attention was mostly directed towards East Asia and Central Europe. The Soviet Union supported the Israeli Declaration of Independence in 1948 and demonstrated a restrained stance in its foreign policy approach toward Iran, despite the absence of limitations imposed by Western powers. It was only under the leadership of Nikita Khrushchev, beginning in 1953, that the USSR would start pursuing a more proactive foreign policy throughout the region.

=== Beginning of the Cold War ===
Due to its geopolitical significance and its vast oil resources, the Middle East gradually evolved into an arena for the rivalry between the United States and the Soviet Union. The USSR sought a greater presence to offset American influence after it had developed close ties with a number of states in the region, particularly Saudi Arabia and Iran. Pakistan, Turkey, and Iraq also joined Western-sponsored security alliances in the 1950s, further prompting the USSR to increase its sphere of influence and presence in the region. The rise of Arab nationalism, which had replaced Islamism as the leading ideology in the region after the establishment of nation states in the aftermath of the First World War, presented the Soviet Union with an opportunity to establish consistent relations with the Arab world, as the movement had anti-Western tendencies and showed some sympathy toward the Soviet Union and its ideology. In the 1950s, the USSR would go on to forge ties with Arab nationalist leaders in Egypt, Syria, Iraq, Algeria, and North Yemen. In 1955, the Soviet Union spearheaded the Egyptian-Czechoslovak arms deal. This was considered a turning point in the Cold War and marked a major entry of the USSR in the great-power struggle in the Middle East.

== Influence and involvement ==
=== Anti-Western approach and Turkish rivalry ===
The relationship between the Soviet Union and the Middle East focused on rivalry with the Turks, mistrust of the Persians, and the Afghan conflict. Under Nikita Khrushchev, the Soviets were inconsistent in their Middle Eastern policies and mistrusted by the Arabs. The Arabs viewed the Soviets as anti-imperialistic (since the Russian Revolution overthrew the Russian monarchy) and, after Arab setbacks following the Arab-Israeli wars, as bureaucrats concerned solely with Soviet interests. Soviet inconsistency and their weapon inferiority to the West were the main reasons for the Arabs distancing themselves from Moscow and returning to the West. The Soviets tried to slow (if not halt) the flow of Arab petroleum to the West. After the Six-Day War, the Soviet Union became a major player in the Middle East as its proxy countries dragged it deeper into Mideast political intrigue. The Soviets provided continued support to their Arab allies in their struggle with Israel. Moscow's policy changed after the Yom Kippur War as it used its client states to act out aggression toward the West during the Iran–Iraq War. The Soviets were a strongman in the Middle East and interceded to maintain tensions as a distraction to the West. Soviet foreign policy in the Middle East emphasized the Arab nations and their interaction with the West. Moscow had little use for the region except to distract Washington from Berlin early in the Cold War. John S. Badeau wrote about the background of Soviet-American relations with the Arabs after World War II in Proceedings of the Academy of Political Science.

=== Arab–Iranian conflict ===
The Soviet policy of favoring one Arab group often drove the others towards the West. Increased Soviet favoritism towards Iraq and Syria pushed Egypt (former Soviet ally) and Saudi Arabia back towards the West. The Soviets used a stick-and-carrot approach to persuade the Arabs into joining their sphere of influence, although the Arab League maintained closer ties with religion. The Soviets' invasion of Afghanistan severely reduced their popularity and credibility in the Arab world. Although Moscow initially reaped rewards from its involvement in the Arab world, it lost diplomatic trust through its missteps and lackluster policies. In addition to their invasion of Afghanistan, their most notable mistake was to initially support both Iran and Iraq during their early-1980s war before only supporting Iraq. This cost Iran the diplomatic respect of the Arab nations, pushing it further towards the West. Throughout the Cold War, foreign relations between the Soviet Union and the People's Democratic Republic of Yemen (PDRY) are thought to have been particularly close. The PDRY was the only Arab state to ever have officially adopted Marxist–Leninist ideology and this long represented an ideological victory for the USSR. Throughout the state's existence between 1967 and 1990, the USSR gained far-reaching influence over numerous sectors within the country, including its military, economy, and politics.

=== Arab–Israeli conflict ===
The Arab world dealt with social tensions through conflict, which the Soviets used to drive wedges between the Arabs and the West. The Middle East is a key supplier of oil for the Europeans. Arab nationalism affected relations between Iran and the Arab world; unlike some Arab countries, it was not colonized by the Western powers, who viewed it as a buffer state with the Soviet Union after the breakup of the Ottoman Empire following World War I, and saw itself as equal to the Europeans. The Soviet invasion of Afghanistan created further tension with its support of fledgling communist regimes while attacking an Islamic nation.

== Shuttle diplomacy ==
=== Vietnam War and Sino-Soviet split ===
Shuttle diplomacy was instrumental in brokering a Middle Eastern peace. U.S. Secretary of State Henry Kissinger spent considerable time at Middle Eastern peace talks as a neutral party. He explained the reasons behind the need to pull out of Vietnam, which complicated the Middle Eastern talks and the nascent nuclear-nonproliferation-treaty talks. President Richard Nixon used the Sino-Soviet split to begin ending the Cold War by breaking down political and economic barriers between the U.S. and China, further isolating the Soviets. Kissinger spoke about his roles in brokering peace between the Arabs and Israelis and ending the nuclear-arms race. Nixon also became a key player in Middle East peace talks, ignoring Dwight D. Eisenhower's non-interventionism and hoping that his reputation for ending the Vietnam War, brokering the first nuclear-arms treaty and opening China to American trade would overshadow the Watergate scandal.

=== Camp David Accords and aftermath ===
The Arab-Israeli peace process was complex during the Soviet era. Although the Soviets were reluctant to join the American-backed peace movement (since they wanted a divided West), the cost of the arms race was beginning to bankrupt the Soviet Union. Strained relations among the parties stalled the initial negotiations, exacerbated by American-North Vietnamese peace negotiations. Moscow was limited in the peace talks because it did not recognize Israel diplomatically, which enabled the United States to talk to both sides.

The U.S. responded to Soviet influence in the Middle East after the Camp David Accords by using economic sanctions to influence the Arab world. Geopolitics transitioned from post-Cold War polarization to 21st-century regional conflicts. The lack of two superpowers destabilized the Middle East as pressure-relieving, limited proxy conflicts grew into greater conflicts which spawned genocide.

== See also ==
- Cold War in Asia
- Foreign policy of the Russian Empire
  - Russo-Turkish wars
  - Russo-Persian wars
- Russian Federation and the Middle East
  - Russia and the Iran–Israel proxy conflict
