= Palestine–Russia relations =

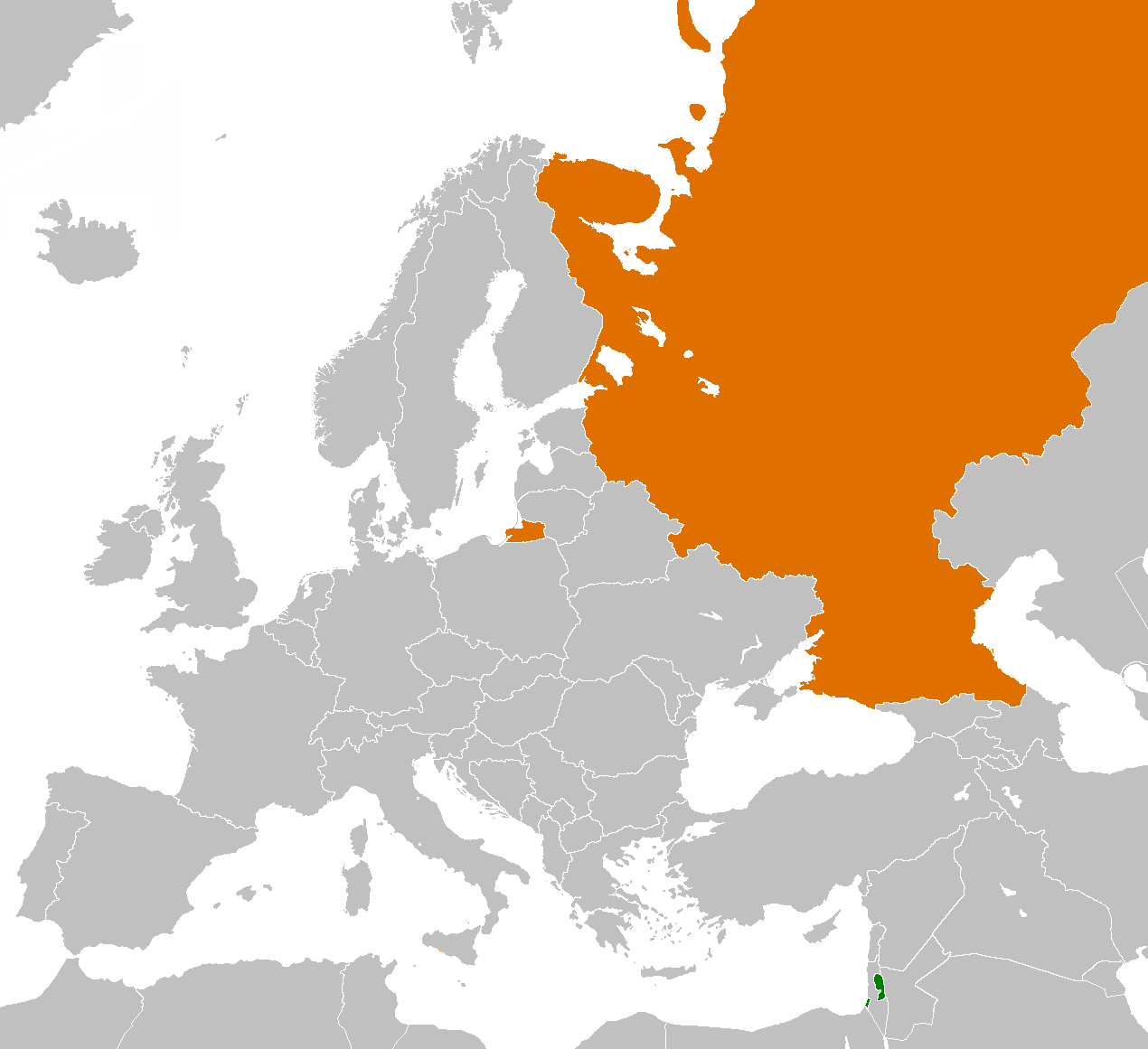

- Palestine: Russia

The bilateral relations between the State of Palestine and Russia (and before 1992, the Soviet Union) have a complex history, deeply interwoven with Russian and Soviet relations with the Israeli enterprise, Palestinian nationalism, and Third World national liberation movements. Between 1956 and 1990, Soviet–Palestinian relations were part of the then-ongoing Soviet–American confrontation.

== History ==
The emir of Palestine, Zahir al-Umar, jointly invaded the emirate of Lebanon with the Russians in the 1770s. Beirut was occupied more than once before the Ottomans re-established control.

After the Russian Revolution of 1917, which put Vladimir Lenin and the Communist Party of the Soviet Union in power, the Soviet Union was established as a socialist state. In 1930, the Executive Committee of the Communist International described Zionism as "the expression of the exploiting, and great power oppressive strivings, of the Jewish bourgeoisie." Also, the Communist Party of Palestine, founded by Jewish immigrants in 1919, upon admission to the Comintern, was strongly advised to "support the national freedom of the Arab population against the British–Zionist occupation." But even so, the Communist Party of Palestine had little political power. Furthermore, the Soviet Union under Joseph Stalin had little impact on Middle East policy.

However, when World War II concluded, the Soviet Union emerged as one of the victors and became a superpower. The USSR voted for the United Nations Partition Plan for Palestine in 1947.

The Soviet Union was the first state to recognize the Israeli state de jure three days after the Declaration of Independence on May 17, 1948.

From late 1944 until 1948 and even later, Joseph Stalin adopted a pro-Zionist foreign policy, apparently believing that the new country would turn socialist (as left-wing governments had led the country for several decades) and would speed the decline of British influence in the Middle East.

The Soviet government was very cautious about the Palestine Liberation Organization (PLO) (founded in 1964) and the Fatah party (founded in 1958) during the 1960s. The Soviet government was unhappy about the first two PLO leaders. Nevertheless, the Soviet Union established some contact with the PLO leadership in 1964; in 1965, they established contacts with the General Union of Palestinian Students and the General Union of Palestinian Women. Soon after, in 1969, Yasser Arafat became a chairman of the PLO.

By the 1970s, with the loss of Soviet influence in Egypt, the Soviet Union sought better relations with Palestinian militants, and Soviet arms and training were provided to militant groups.

The KGB was responsible for arming and training most of the militant groups. The KGB decided which groups should receive the money and weapons. By 1972, the Soviets had declared the Palestinian movement the vanguard of the Arab liberation movement. In the summer of 1974, a PLO embassy was opened in Moscow. During this time Yasser Arafat had addressed the United Nations and soon the PLO was granted observer status at the UN in 1974. In 1975, the Soviet Union sponsored and voted in support of the UN General Assembly Resolution 3379, which equated Zionism with racism, but reversed this position when they both sponsored and voted for Resolution 4686 in 1991.

In March 1985, Mikhail Gorbachev assumed power, and he started his programs of glasnost and perestroika, which resulted in many changes. The Soviet Union began to reduce its support for Third World and other leftist guerrilla movements and urged them to embrace reconciliation. USSR also encouraged (albeit unsuccessfully) Yasser Arafat and the PLO to recognize Israel before the Palestinian Declaration of Independence on November 15, 1988, in Algiers, Algeria.

During and after the dissolution of the Soviet Union in the early 1990s, Russia began to improve its relations with Israel, which had been cut off in the aftermath of the Six-Day War.

During the Gulf War in early 1991, many elements of the PLO, along with Arafat, had supported Saddam. The diplomatic isolation caused the Soviet Union to scale back support for the PLO. The Soviet Union was disbanded in December 1991, a few months after the August Coup. The PLO had been sympathetic to the coup plotters, greatly angering Gorbachev and the Soviet leaders. This caused the Soviet government to abandon its support for the PLO. As a result, the PLO began peace talks with Israel in 1991. These events, coupled with the growing Islamist trend in Palestinian society and militancy, weakened the pro-Soviet Palestinian militant groups, most of whom had taken on a hard Marxist–Leninist line.

== Current relations ==
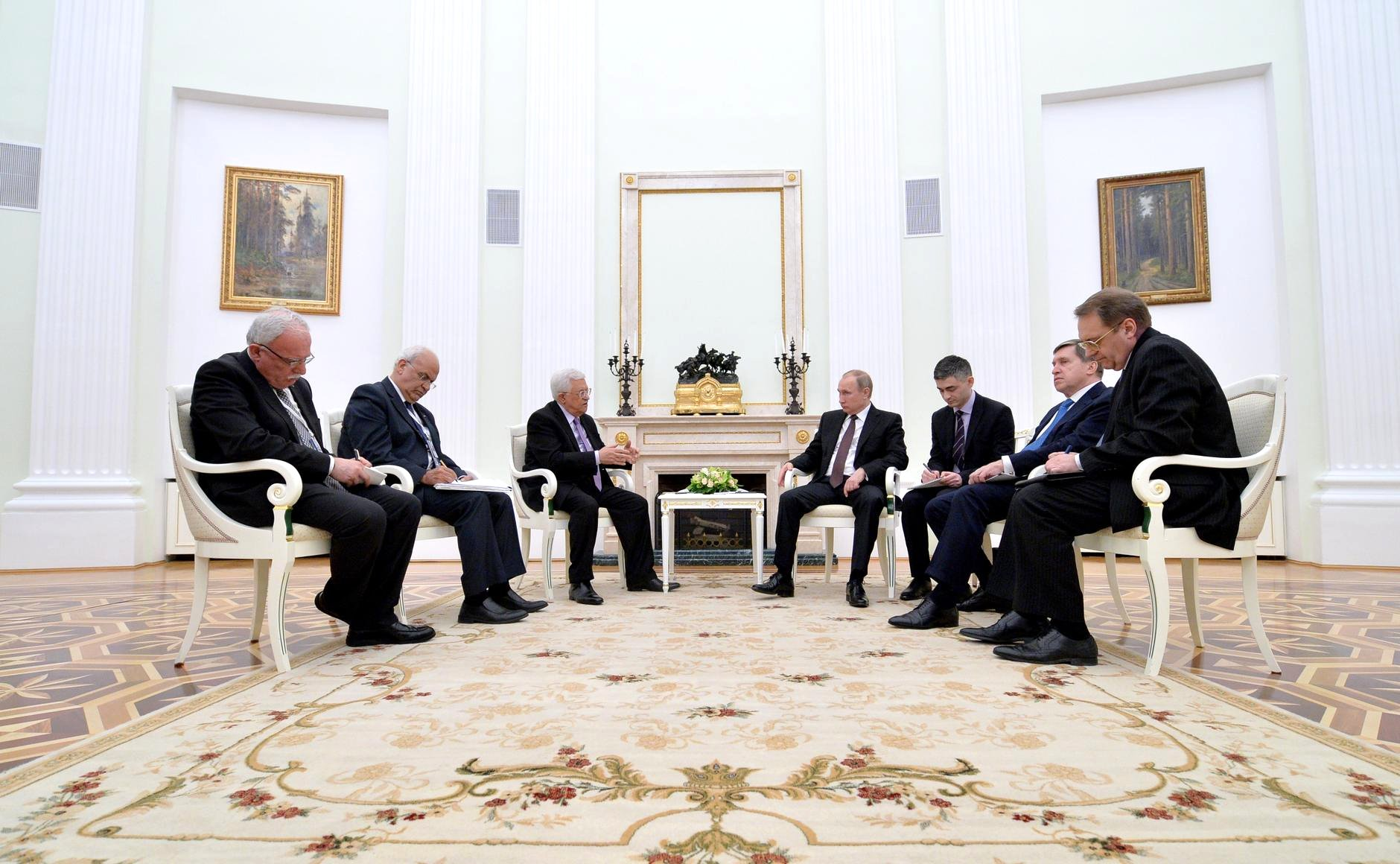
Mahmoud Abbas and Vladimir Putin. April 18, 2016 in Kremlin.

After the fall of the Soviet Union, the newly created Russian Federation continued supporting the militants, albeit in a somewhat limited fashion.

Russia voted in favor of the Oslo agreements in 1993. Yasser Arafat was a frequent visitor to Moscow during the 1990s until 2001. Russian trained Palestinian militants were involved in the First and Second Chechen Wars under the Arab Mujahideen in Chechnya.

With his accession after Arafat’s death in 2004, Mahmoud Abbas cultivated connections to Russia. Underscoring these, Abbas earned his degree at the Patrice Lumumba University in Moscow where he had earned his Candidate of Sciences degree (the Soviet equivalent of a PhD). Abbas has continued visiting Russia and has met with Russian leaders several times.

In March 2006, after Hamas’ win in the Palestinian elections earlier that year, Russian-Hamas talks began, as Russian Foreign Minister Sergei Lavrov met with Hamas leader Khaled Meshaal to discuss the future of the Israeli–Palestinian peace process. (Hamas had won a majority of seats in the Palestinian National Authority Legislative Council). Before the meeting, in an interview on February 10, 2006, Russian president Vladimir Putin, according to Kommersant journalist Andrey Kolesnikov and a Spanish parliament member, said that he does not consider Hamas a freedom fighter organization. This is despite Hamas’ charter emphasizing jihad. During the talks in March 2006, Lavrov called on Hamas to comply with the earlier commitments signed by the PLO, reiterating those requirements. Hamas promised to respect "the authority and competencies" of Abbas. In an interview in the Austrian daily Kurier, senior Hamas official Aziz Dweik answered the question of whether a two-state solution was feasible: "If Israel changes its attitudes toward Palestinians, if it does so much as soften its occupation practice, everything would change. Israel has to do the first step." On March 7, 2006 Russia expressed hope that Hamas would consider supporting the Roadmap for peace and the peace plan proposed by Saudi Arabia." The invitation and the talks caused controversy regarding Russia changing its views towards the Israeli–Palestinian conflict. This was questioned by commentators in the United States especially among the neoconservatives.

Russia was critical of the Gaza War (2008–09) and condemned Israeli actions. In addition to 60 tons of aid consisting of tents, medicines, and foods, President Medvedev ordered extra humanitarian aid to be sent to the Palestinians.

Palestine has separate governments in the Gaza Strip (Hamas) and the West Bank (Fatah) after a brief civil war in 2007. After a meeting between the foreign minister of Russia Sergei Lavrov and the Palestinian foreign minister Riyad al-Maliki (Fatah) on December 9, 2009, both Russia and Palestine have said that their relations are close and friendly and that Russia will continue to assist Palestine in all fields. On January 26, 2010, Mahmoud Abbas met with Russian president Dmitry Medvedev to discuss the situation in the Middle East. He said that while some progress has been made on peace, it is still not solved yet. President Medvedev said that he hopes to use Russia's influence to solve the Middle East conflict. He also mentioned the long-standing, friendly and deep-rooted ties between both Russia and Palestine. On March 19, 2010, the Middle East Quartet which was composed of the European Union, Russia, the United States, and the United Nations called for a resumption of peace talks between both Israel and Palestine. The Quartet also called for Israel to freeze settlement construction and resume peace talks with Palestine. After the Gaza flotilla raid on May 31, 2010, Russian president Dmitry Medvedev called for a thorough investigation of the incident and said that, in any case, the deaths of people are irreversible. Prime Minister Vladimir Putin condemned the assault and expressed concern that it was conducted in international waters. On June 8, Putin condemned the acts and called for it to be investigated specially, particularly because it occurred in international waters. In a rare display of unity, the Foreign Ministries of Russia and the EU adopted a joint statement concerning the flotilla attack, which correlates with the UN Security Council activity in the situation. Russia's Foreign Ministry further expressed "condemnation and profound concern" over the incident and called for a full investigation. It stated that the "use of arms against civilians and the detention of the vessels on the high seas without any legal grounds constitute a gross violation of generally accepted international legal norms." The head of the Russian State Duma Foreign Affairs Committee, Konstantin Kosachev, called for an "urgent meeting" of the Middle East Quartet to discuss the incident. On April 28, 2011 after the rival Palestinian factions Fatah and Hamas signed a deal (ultimately unfulfilled) to form a national unity government ahead of the national elections, the Russian Foreign Ministry spokesman Alexei Sazonov said that Russia was pleased with the fact that the Palestinians were able to reach an accord and that Russia hoped that with the implementation of the accord there will be hope for peace in the Middle East. He also said that Russia always supports the national aspirations of the Palestinian people.

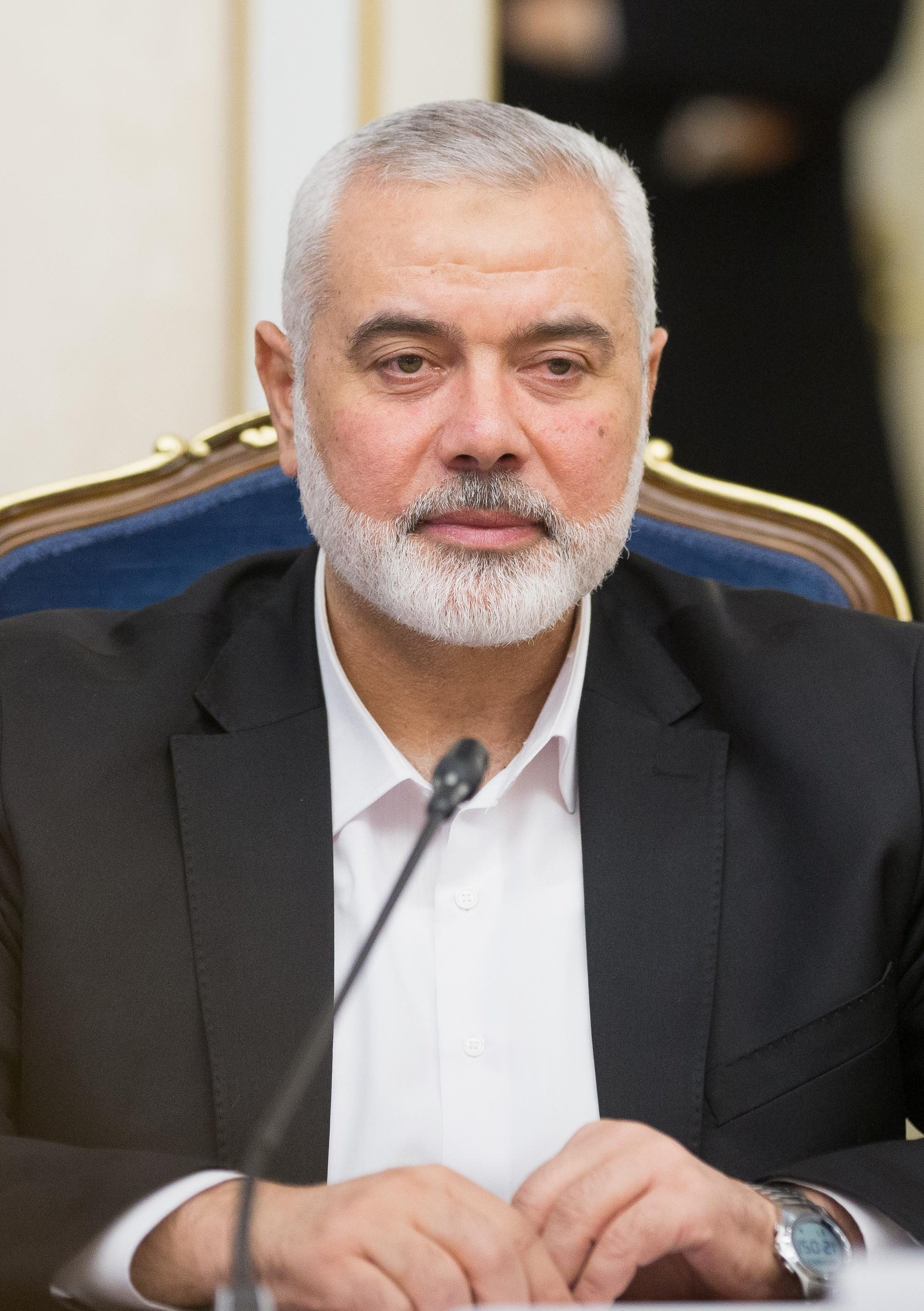
Hamas leader Ismail Haniyeh in a meeting in Moscow in 2020.

On November 27, 2011, Russian president Medvedev sent Palestinian president Abbas an official letter of support for Palestinian statehood.

During the November 2012 Operation Pillar of Defense in the Gaza Strip, the Russian Foreign Minister Sergei Lavrov called for end to the violence after a meeting held with Gulf Arab foreign ministers in Riyadh. Foreign Ministry spokesman Alexander Lukashevich said: "The attacks on southern Israel, as well as Israel's disproportionate shelling, are entirely unacceptable. We urge all sides to end the military confrontation immediately and to prevent a new round of bloodshed in the Gaza Strip." Following a telephone conversation between President Putin and Netanyahu, the presidential press service said that "The President of Russia called on the parties to exercise restraint and avoid the path of escalating violence, whose victims include civilians, and to do everything to return the situation to its normal course". On November 29, 2012, Russia voted in favor of UN General Assembly Resolution 67/19 on upgrading Palestine to non-member observer state status in the United Nations. During the 2014 Israel–Gaza conflict, Russian president Vladimir Putin telephoned Israeli Prime Minister Benjamin Netanyahu urging him to stop the operation in Gaza that “lead [sic] to multiple deaths among civilians." It added that "the conversation was requested by the Israeli side." In a telephone conversation with Israeli prime minister Benjamin Netanyahu on July 23, Russian President Vladimir Putin said further fighting in Gaza will lead to a dramatic deterioration of the humanitarian situation and to more casualties and suffering among the civilian population. Putin stressed that "there is no alternative to ceasefire and a political settlement" and reiterated his readiness to "facilitate mediatory efforts and the implementation of peace initiatives, including within the UN framework". Chairman of the Foreign Affairs Committee of the Federation Council, in the upper house of the Russian Parliament, Mikhail Margelov, said Russia is ready to facilitate reconciliation between Palestine and Israel. He also said that "It is very important for us that the parties complied with the UN resolutions. Our position remained unchanged: we want the Jewish and Arab peoples to live in peace and accord. We’re ready to facilitate the peace process at the bilateral level and within international organizations. Amid the ground operation in Gaza, the logic of events prevails over political expediency. In Gaza, there are different groups that do not maintain contacts. The situation is not controlled by a single centre. This complicates attempts to find a political solution". On July 25, the Russian Foreign Ministry published a message calling for an immediate ceasefire in Gaza under Egypt's initiative saying "The events in Gaza arouse growing concern. We condemn the death of innocent people, primarily children, during the attack on the UN school in Beit-Hanoun".

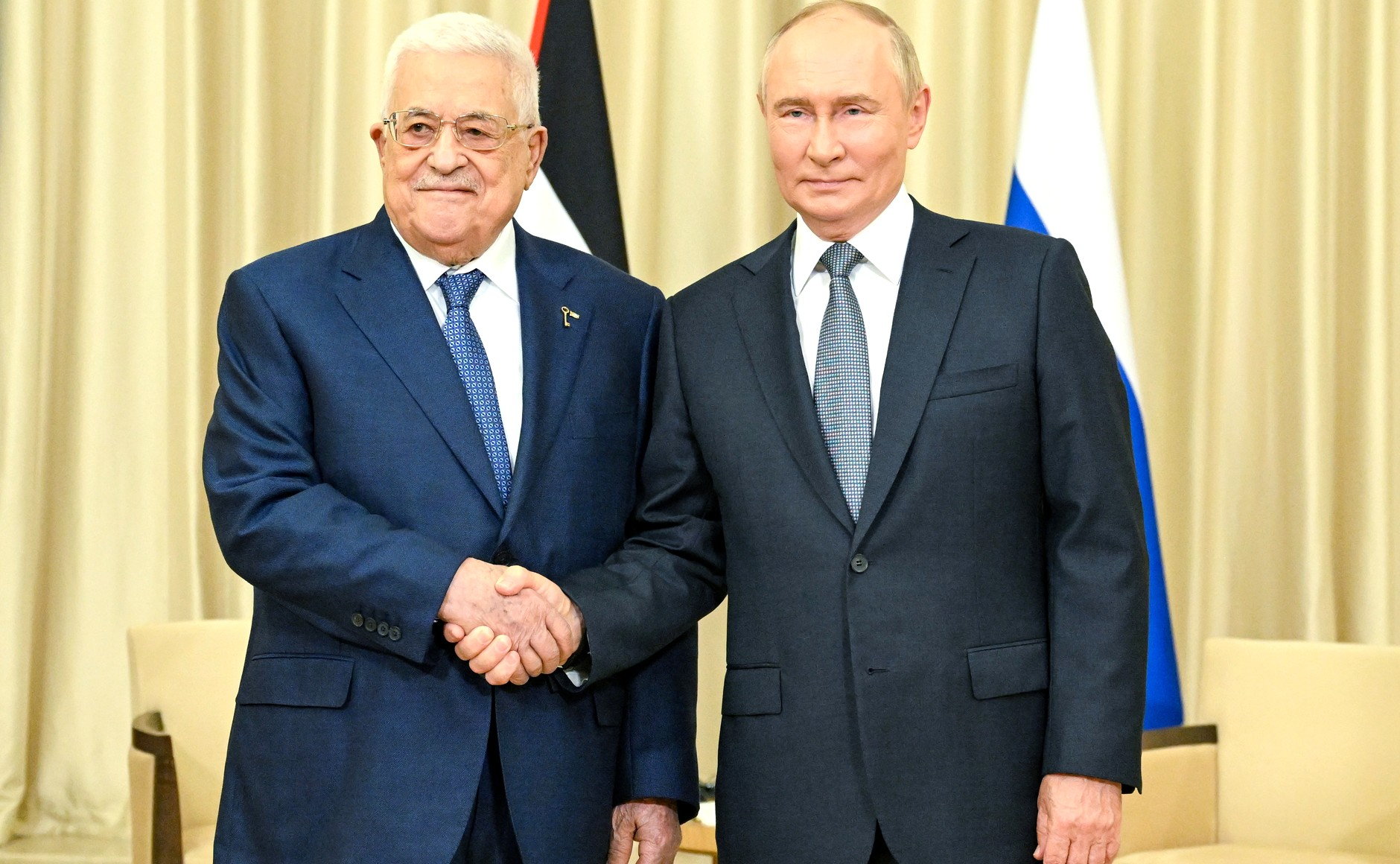
Mahmoud Abbas with Vladimir Putin in Novo-Ogaryovo, Russia, 13 August 2024

In October 2022, during a meeting with Putin in Kazakhstan, Abbas dismissed the US's role in the Israeli–Palestinian conflict and expressed his desire for Russia to play a more central role as mediator, provoking criticism by Washington. A senior Palestinian diplomat told Arab News that Russia "is a great country, friendly and supportive of the rights of the Palestinian people, and seriously supportive of its cause."

Putin condemned the October 7 attacks that sparked the Gaza war and said Israel had a right to defend itself, but also criticized Israel's response and said Israel should not besiege the Gaza Strip in the way Nazi Germany besieged Leningrad. Putin suggested that Russia could be a mediator in the conflict.

In December 2023, Russia's foreign minister Sergei Lavrov said that Russia's goals of "demilitarization" and "denazification" in Ukraine were similar to Israel's stated goals of defeating Hamas and extremism in Gaza.

== See also ==
- Foreign relations of Russia
- Foreign relations of Palestine
- Israel–Russia relations
- Russia and the Iran–Israel proxy conflict
