= Cold War in Asia =

The Asian Cold War was a major dimension of the global Cold War, shaping diplomacy and warfare from the mid-1940s to 1991. The primary countries involved were the United States, the Soviet Union, China, North Korea, South Korea, North Vietnam, South Vietnam, Cambodia, Afghanistan, Iran, Iraq, Thailand, Laos, India, Bangladesh, Pakistan, Malaya (Malaysia), Sarawak (Malaysia), Indonesia, and Taiwan. In the late 1950s, the rift between China and the Soviet Union deepened, ultimately leading to the Sino-Soviet split, after which both nations competed for control of communist movements worldwide, particularly in Asia.

== East Asia ==
=== United States activities ===
==== China and Taiwan Strait ====
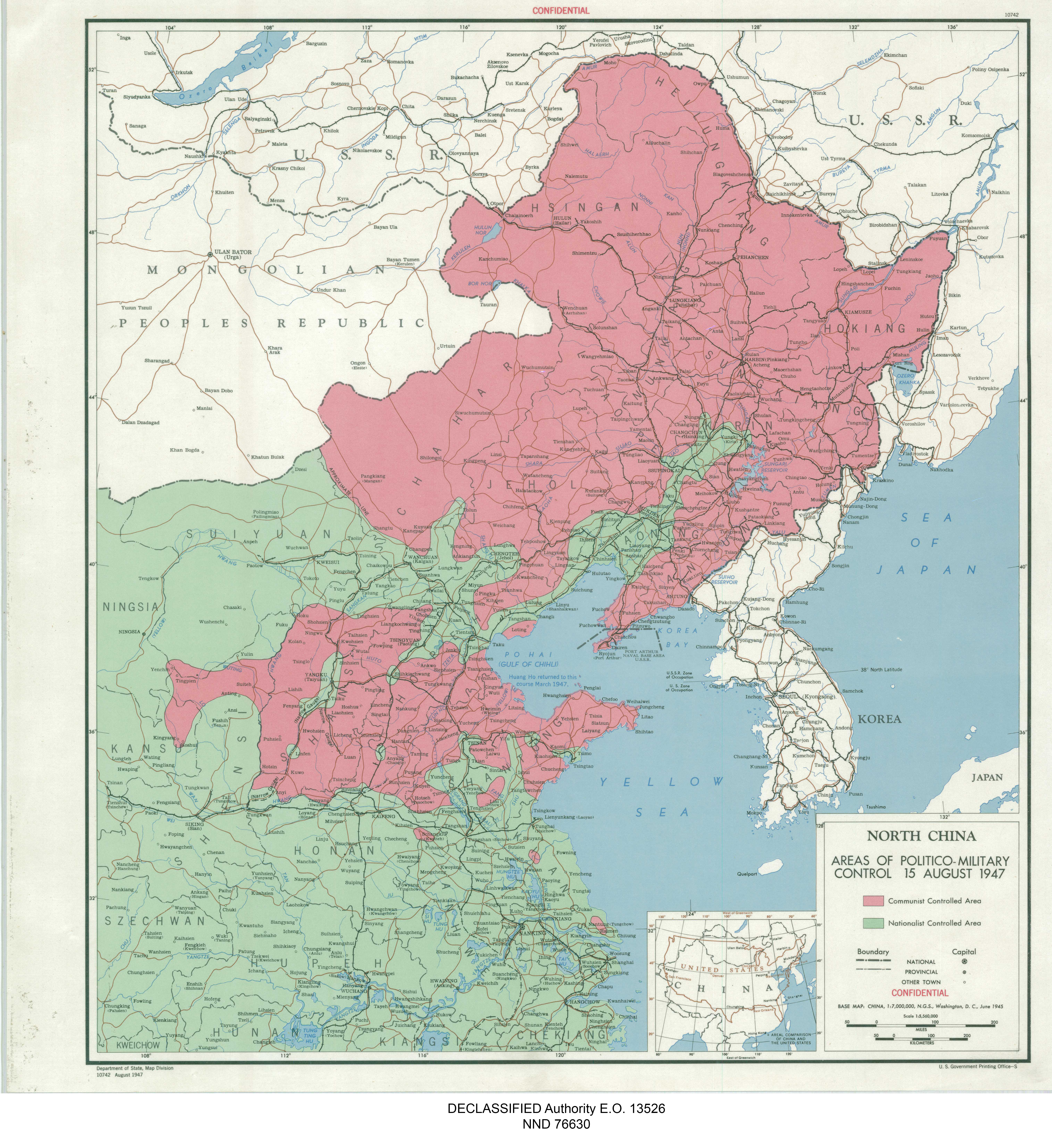
Map of the Chinese Civil War as of August 1947

The Nationalist government led by Chiang Kai-shek was defeated by the Communist party, led by Mao Zedong, in the Chinese Civil War. In contrast to the strong support from the Soviet Union towards the CCP, United States did not provide significant aid to the Nationalists in the civil war. Hence, the conflict is not a typical aspect of the Cold War until 1949. The United States resumed its support of nationalist China on the island Taiwan after the outbreak of Korean War and the Communist victory in north Vietnam. China, under the rule of the Chinese Communist Party, received great support from Soviet Union, while the Nationalists in Taiwan were granted security and economic aid from the United States. Both sides were rebuilt by the aid programs from their respective allies after World War II, and became one of the tension spots in the Cold War. Armed conflicts occurred from time to time between 1950 and 1970. Among them, the First Taiwan Strait Crisis in 1954 and the Battle of Kinmen in 1958 were the biggest battles in the region. After the United States shifted its recognition from the government in Taipei to the government in Beijing in 1979, the cross strait tension became a regional conflict rather than part of the global Cold War.

Harold Isaacs published Scratches on our Minds: American Images of China and India in 1955. By reviewing the popular and scholarly literature on Asia that appeared in the United States and by interviewing many American experts, Isaacs identified six stages of American attitudes toward China. They were "respect" (18th century), "contempt" (1840–1905), "benevolence" (1905 to 1937), "admiration" (1937–1944); "disenchantment" (1944–1949), and "hostility" (after 1949). In 1990, historian Jonathan Spence updated Isaac's model to include "reawakened curiosity" (1970–1974); "guileless fascination" (1974–1979), and "renewed skepticism" (1980s).

Political scientist Peter Rudolf in 2020 argued that Americans see China as a threat to the established order in its drive for regional hegemony in East Asia now, and a future aspirant for global supremacy. Beijing rejects these notions, but continues its assertive policies and its quest for allies.

==== Korean War 1950–1953 ====
Map of the Korean War Chinese and Soviet forces North Korean forces South Korean and United Nations forces

The Korean War began at the end of June 1950 when North Korea, a communist country, invaded South Korea, which was under U.S. protection. The Truman Doctrine of 1947 aimed to contain the spread of communism and Soviet influence, and pledged to help any country threatened by communism. Without consulting Congress, President Harry S Truman ordered General Douglas MacArthur to use all American forces to resist the invasion. Truman then received approval from the United Nations, which the Soviets were boycotting. UN forces managed to cling to a toehold in Korea, as the North Koreans outran their supply system. MacArthur's counterattack at Inchon destroyed the invasion army, and the UN forces captured most of North Korea on their way to the Yalu River, Korea's northern border with China. President Truman had decided—and the UN agreed—to reunify all of Korea. UN forces were poised to decisively defeat the North Korean invaders.

In October 1950, China intervened in North Korea due to the advance of UN forces dangerously close to the Yalu River. They drove UN forces all the way back to South Korea as Mao Zedong felt threatened by the close proximity of the war to the border at the Yalu River. Although technically far inferior, his army had much larger manpower resources and was just across Korea's northern border at the Yalu River. The fighting stabilized close to the original 38th parallel that had divided North and South. UN-US commanding general Douglas MacArthur wanted to continue the rollback strategy of unifying Korea but Truman changed and instead switched to a policy of containment that would allow North Korea to persist. Truman's dismissal of MacArthur in April 1951 sparked an intense debate on American Far Eastern Cold War policy. Truman took the blame for a high-cost stalemate with 37,000 Americans killed and over 100,000 wounded. Peace talks bogged down over the question of repatriating prisoners who did not want to return to Communism. President Eisenhower broke the impasse by warning he might use nuclear weapons, and an armistice was reached that has remained in effect ever since, with large American forces still stationed in South Korea as a tripwire. Despite the signing of a peace agreement on 27 July 1953, some historians believe in the 'unending' Korean war as the country is still heavily militarised. For example, the US still stations 29,500 troops in Korea even today in spite of the ceasefire back in 1953.

=== Chinese split with USSR ===
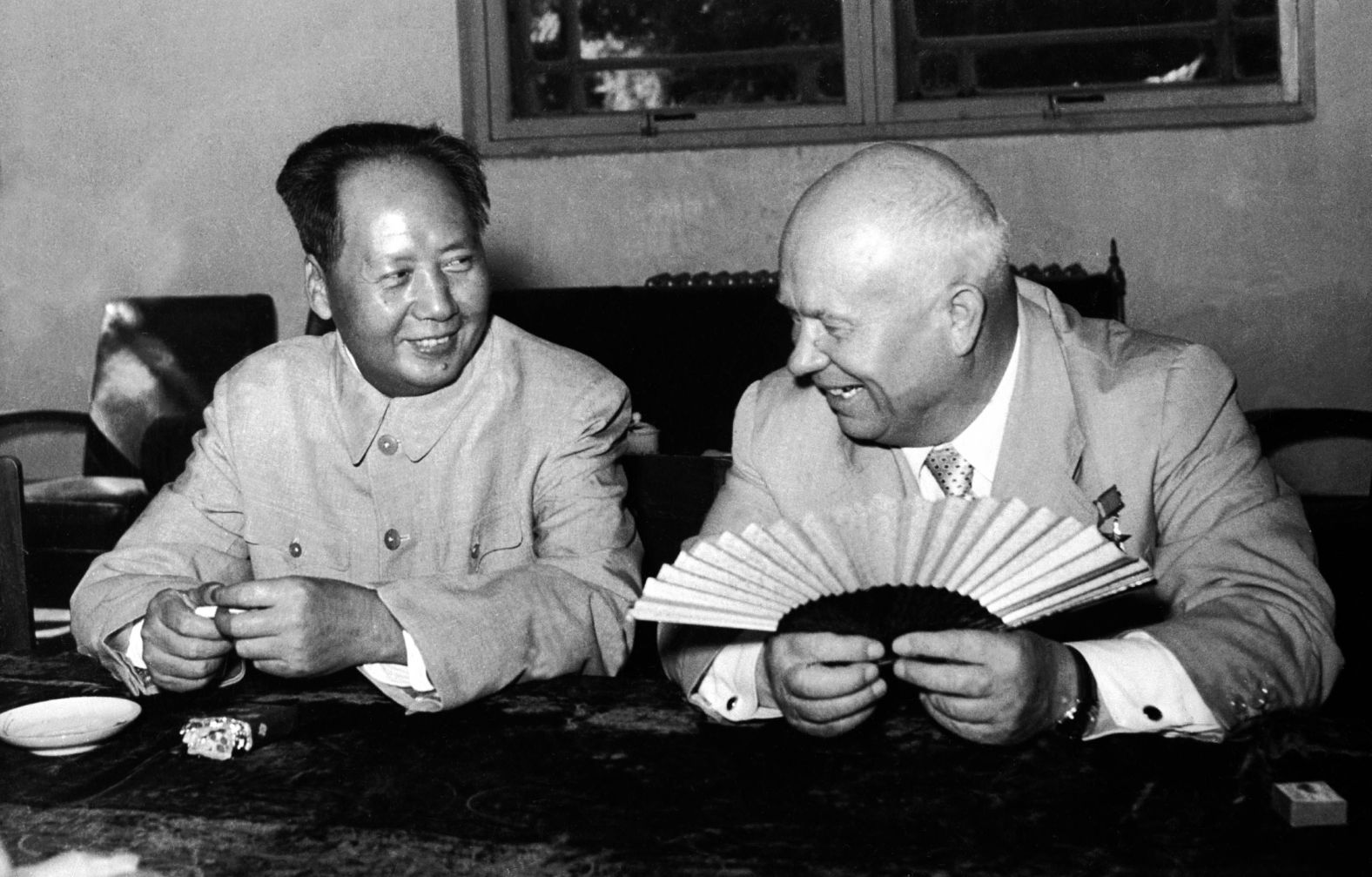
Mao Zedong (left) and Nikita Khrushchev (right) in Beijing, 1957

Beijing was pleased that the success of the Soviet Union in the space race—the original Sputniks—demonstrated that the international communist movement had caught up in the area of high technology with the Americans. Mao assumed that the Soviets now had a military advantage and should step up the Cold War but Khrushchev knew that the Americans were well ahead in military uses of space. However, ties between the two countries frayed, quickly making a dead letter of the 1950 alliance, destroying the socialist camp unity, and affected the world balance of power. The split started with Nikita Khrushchev De-Stalinization program which angered Mao as he admired Stalin. Moscow and Beijing became rivals and forced communist parties around the world to take sides.

Internally, the Sino-Soviet split led Mao to plunge China into the Cultural Revolution, to expunge traces of Russian ways of thinking. Mao argued that as far as all-out nuclear war was concerned, the human race would not be destroyed, and instead a brave new communist world would arise from the ashes of imperialism. This attitude troubled Moscow, which had a more realistic view of the utter disasters that would accompany a nuclear war. Three major issues suddenly became critical in dividing the two nations: Taiwan, India, and China's Great Leap Forward. Although Moscow supported Beijing's position that Taiwan entirely belong to China, it demanded that it be forewarned of any invasion or serious threat that would bring American intervention. Beijing refused, and the Chinese bombardment of the island of Quemoy in August 1958 escalated tensions. Moscow was cultivating India, both as a major purchaser of munitions, and a strategically critical ally. However China was escalating its threats to the northern fringes of India, especially from Tibet. It was building a militarily significant road system that would reach disputed areas along the border. The Russians clearly favored India, and Beijing saw this as a betrayal. By far the major ideological issue was the Great Leap Forward, which represented a Chinese rejection of the Soviet form of economic development. Moscow was deeply resentful, especially since it had spent heavily to supply China with high-technology—including some nuclear skills. Moscow withdrew its vitally needed technicians and economic and military aid. Beijing responded through its official propaganda network of rejecting Moscow's claim to Lenin's heritage and claimed it was the true inheritor of the great Leninist tradition. At one major meeting of communist parties, Khrushchev personally attacked Mao as an ultra leftist—a left revisionist—and compared him to Stalin for dangerous egotism. The conflict was now out of control, and was increasingly fought out in 81 communist parties around the world. The final split came in July 1963, after 50,000 refugees escaped from Xinjiang in western China to Soviet territory to escape persecution.

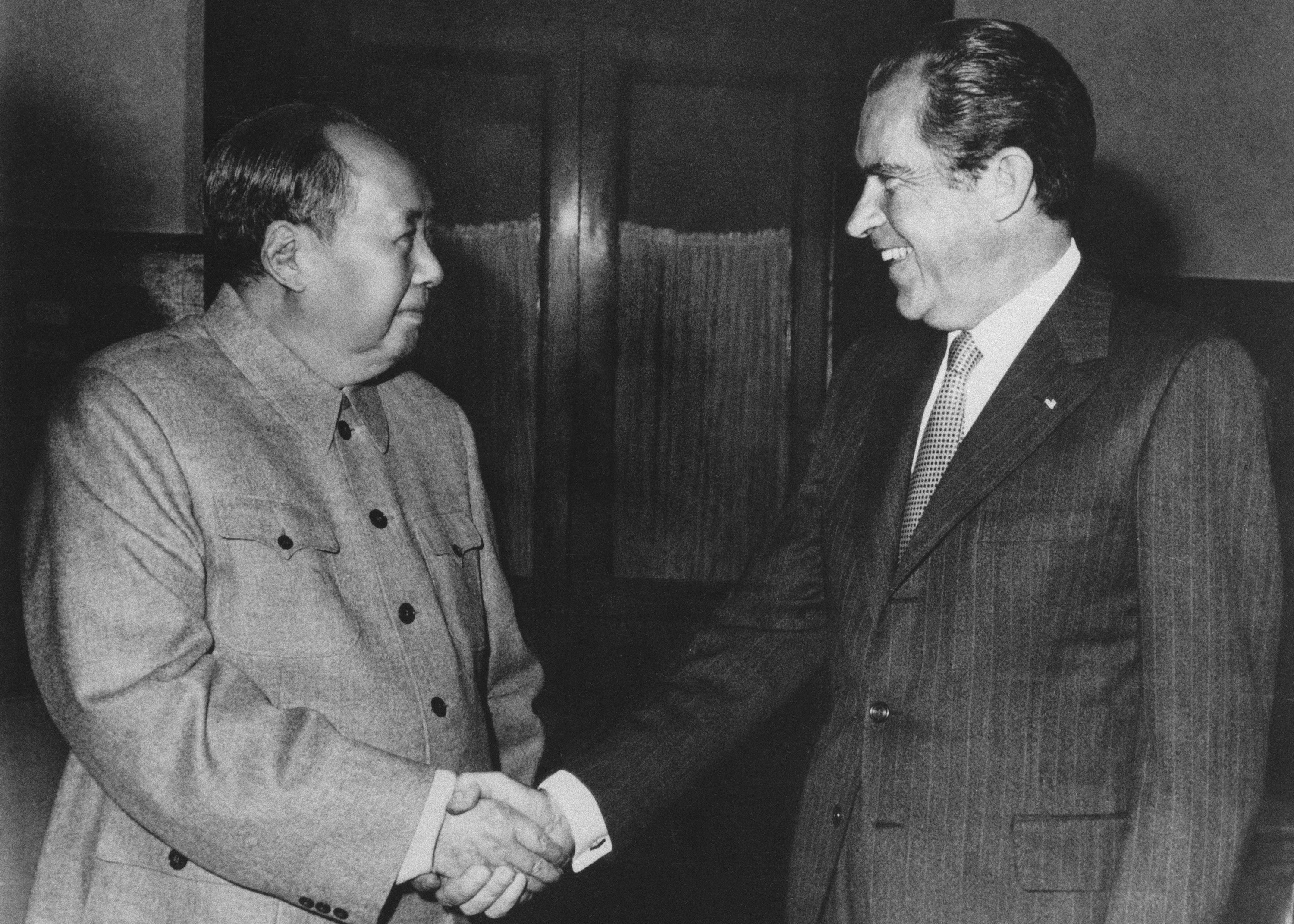
Mao Zedong meeting with Richard Nixon in 1972, after the Sino-Soviet split

Increasingly, Beijing began to consider the Soviet Union, which it viewed as Social imperialism, as the greatest threat it faced, more so than even the leading capitalist power, the United States. In turn, it made overtures to the United States, such as through Ping Pong Diplomacy and Panda Diplomacy.

=== Crisis in 1965 ===
Despite Chinese ambitions, the growing opposition of the United States and of Russia became more formidable, especially in 1965 when the United States launched a massive escalation of its commitment to defending South Vietnam. Furthermore, Washington decided that China was its greatest enemy, more so than the USSR. In response to growing Chinese activity, the non-aligned powers of India and Yugoslavia moved a bit closer to the Soviet Union. Key regional leaders whom China was endorsing were overthrown or pushed back in 1965. Ben Bella was overthrown in Algeria, with a result that the Soviets gained influence in North Africa and the Middle East. Kwame Nkrumah, the most prominent leader of sub-Saharan Africa, was deposed while on a trip to China in early 1966. The new rulers shifted Ghana to the West's side of the Cold War. Mao's efforts to regain prestige by holding a Bandung-like conference was unsuccessful. In October, 1965, came the most disastrous blow to China in the entire Cold war era. The Indonesian army broke with President Sukarno and systematically destroyed the Chinese-oriented PKI Communist party of Indonesia. The army and local Islamic groups killed hundreds of thousands of PKI supporters, and drove many Chinese out of Indonesia. Sukarno remained as a figurehead president but power went to General Suharto, a committed enemy of communism.

== Southeast Asia ==
=== Burma/Myanmar ===
Burma gained independence from Britain in tense fashion in 1948. It avoided any commitment in the Cold War, and was active in the nonaligned movement. There were numerous failed Communist uprisings. The army took control in 1962. The Soviet Union never played a prominent role, and Burma kept its distance from Britain and the United States.

China shares a long controversial border, and relations were usually poor until the late 1980s. In the 1950s Burma lobbied for China's entry as a permanent member into the UN Security Council, but denounced China's invasion of Tibet in 1950. The last border dispute came in 1956, when the Chinese invaded parts of northern Burma, but were repulsed. In the 1960s students and other elements of Burma's large Chinese community expressed support for Maoism; anti-Chinese riots resulted. Close relations began in the late 1980s as China began supplying the military junta with the majority of its arms in exchange for increased access to Burmese markets and intelligence opportunities. China refused to join other nations that condemned Myanmar's policy toward minorities, especially the attacks on the Rohingya Muslims that began in the 1970s.

=== Vietnam ===
==== Eisenhower and Vietnam ====
After the end of World War II, the communist Viet Minh launched an insurrection against an independent associated country within the French Union, the State of Vietnam. Seeking to bolster a NATO ally and prevent the fall of Vietnam to communism, the Truman and Eisenhower administrations financed military operations in Vietnam by its NATO ally, France. Meanwhile, the Viet Minh was helped by communist China. In 1954, the French Union army was trapped near the Chinese border at the Battle of Dien Bien Phu. Eisenhower was reluctant to offer American military support through intervention because of lack of support from Congress, so he sought to seek support from Britain before committing, but the British opposed any military intervention and the French Union army surrendered (see Operation Vulture). New French government of Pierre Mendès France met the communists at the Geneva Conference. Moscow and Beijing forced the Viet Minh to accept partition: the country was divided at 17th parallel into a communist North Vietnam and an anticommunist South Vietnam.

Indochina following the 1954 Accords, showing the partition of Vietnam into two regimes.

On April 5, 1954, Eisenhower argued using domino theory, which was the idea that if one country fell to communist rule, others would follow leading to a domino effect. This theory became a staple of American strategy. He said the loss of Indochina would set off toppling dominoes, putting at risk Thailand, Malaya, Indonesia, Japan, Taiwan, and the Philippines. To prevent that the United States and seven other countries created the Southeast Asia Treaty Organization (SEATO), comprising Australia, France, New Zealand, Pakistan, the Philippines, Thailand, the United Kingdom, and the United States. It was a defensive alliance to prevent the spread of Communism in Southeast Asia. South Vietnam, Laos and Cambodia were not members but observers. Historian David L. Anderson states:

Prepared neither to retreat nor fight, the Eisenhower administration turned to nation building. With profuse American military and economic aid, Diem managed to bring a degree of order to the South, reorganize the Army, and initiate some governmental programs. Washington chose to label Diem a "miracle man"....[By 1960 Eisenhower] believed that Diem was successfully governing his nation and thereby waging the frontline fight against communist expansion at little relative cost to the United States.

==== Kennedy and Vietnam ====
Senator John F. Kennedy in 1956, publicly advocated for greater U.S. involvement in Vietnam. Eisenhower advised him in 1960 that the communist threat in Southeast Asia required priority, especially Laos. However Kennedy put more emphasis on South Vietnam, which he had visited as a reporter in 1951. In May, he dispatched Lyndon Johnson to tell Diem that Washington would help him build a fighting force that could resist the communists. Before that army could fight American combat troops would have to do the fighting.

As the Viet Cong became active Kennedy increased the number of military advisers and special forces from under 1000 in 1960 to 16,000 by late 1963. They trained and advised the South Vietnamese forces but did not fight the enemy. In March 1965, President Lyndon Johnson committed the first combat troops to Vietnam and greatly escalated U.S. involvement. U.S. forces reached 184,000 in 1965 and peaked at 536,000 in 1968, not counting the U.S. Air Force which was based outside Vietnam.

The British had suggestions based on their success in defeating the communist insurrection in Malaya. The result was the Strategic Hamlet Program starting in 1962. It involved some forced relocation, village internment, and segregation of rural South Vietnamese into new communities where the peasantry would be isolated from communist insurgents. It was hoped that these new communities would provide security for the peasants and strengthen the tie between them and the central government. The program ended in 1964.

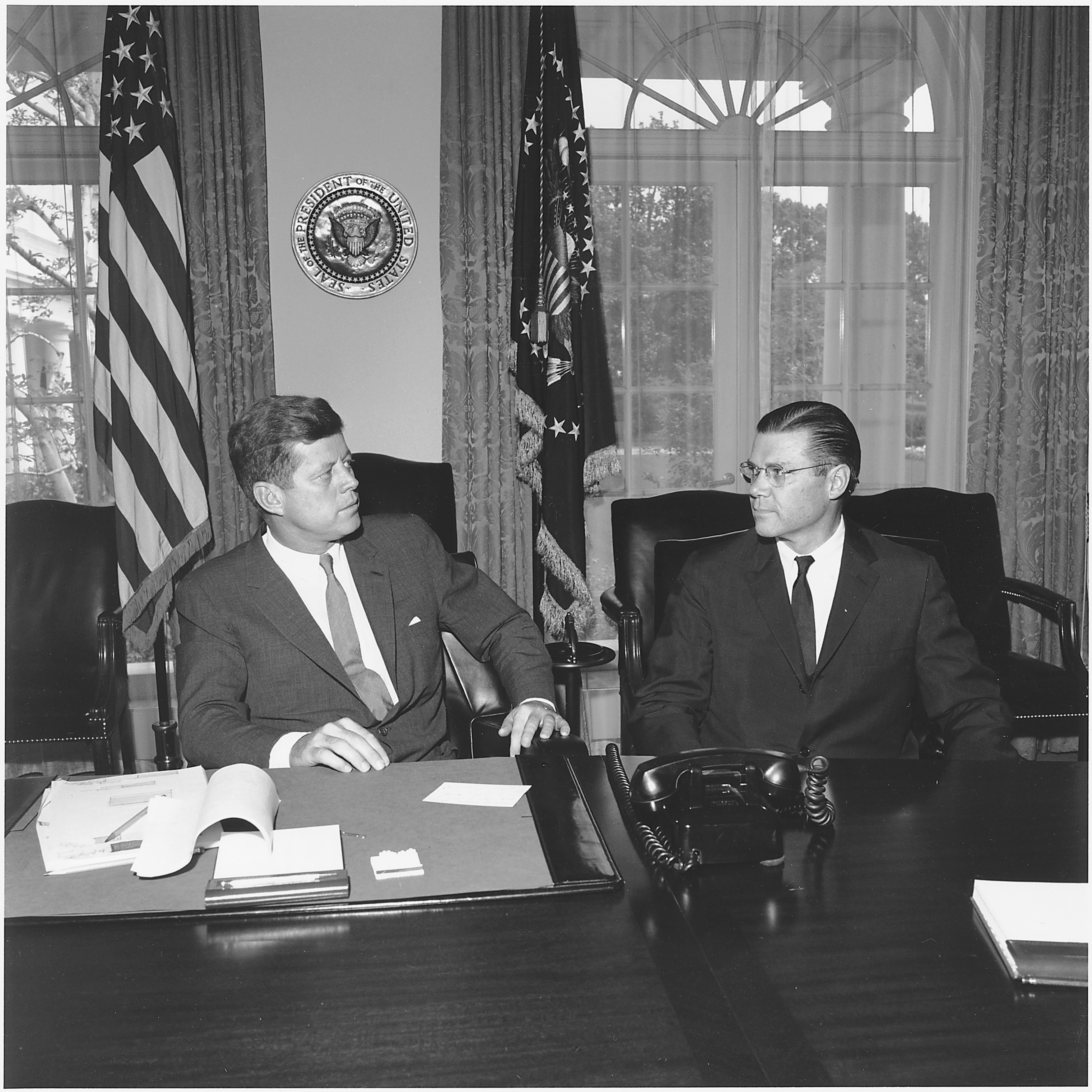
John F. Kennedy meets with Secretary of Defense, Robert McNamara, in 1962

In 1963, the U.S. became frustrated when Diem and his brother Ngo Dinh Nhu used the newly trained forces to crush Buddhist demonstrations. Kennedy sent Defense Secretary Robert McNamara and General Maxwell D. Taylor on the McNamara Taylor mission to figure out what was happening. Diem ignored the protests and was overthrown by the military. The U.S. did not order the coup but approved its actions after it happened, while regretting that Diem was killed in the process. The coup solved the Diem problem and the new government was at first well received in Washington. Historians disagree on whether the Vietnam War would have escalated if Kennedy had survived the assassination attempt in November and been reelected in 1964.

The new President Lyndon Johnson reversed Kennedy's decision to withdraw 1,000 troops, and reaffirmed the policy of assistance to the South Vietnamese government.

==== Johnson and Vietnam ====
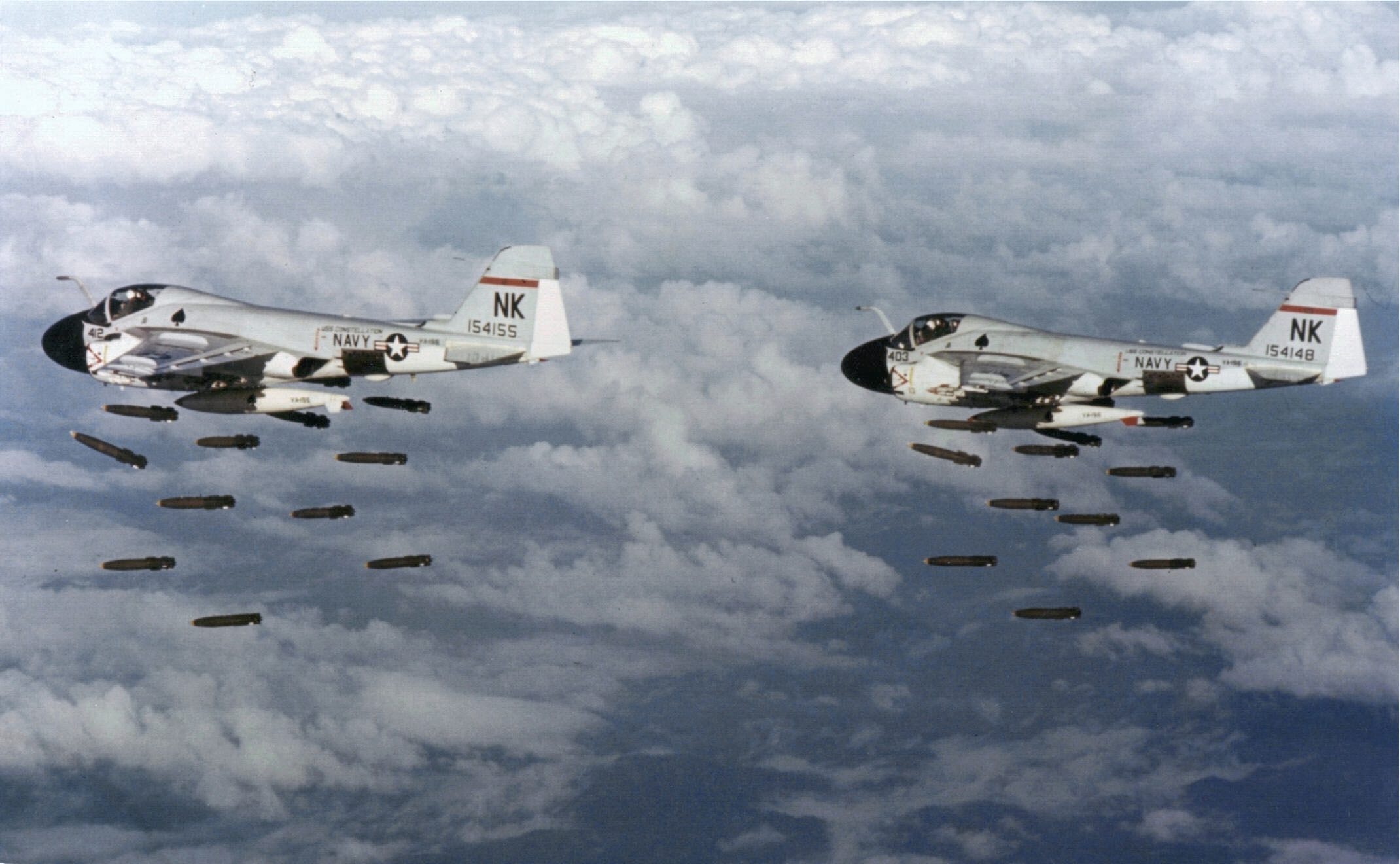
U.S. Navy A-6A Intruder all-weather bombers in 1968

Between November 1963 and July 1965, President Lyndon B. Johnson, after consulting widely, escalated into large-scale American combat on the ground, plus a major air war. Kennedy had given priority in foreign policy to the Soviet Union, Cuba, Berlin, and Latin America. Vietnam was never high on his agenda, nor was China or any part of Asia. In striking contrast the Vietnam War sucked all the attention of the Johnson Administration, even diverting the president away from his special interest in domestic policy. He hated the war because it was diverting funding for his beloved Great Society, and the more attention it received the more money it would take away from domestic goals. Johnson vividly remembered how Harry Truman's political career had been ended by the Korean War, and feared that if they abandoned the long-standing commitment to the containment of communist expansion, the Democratic Party would be badly hurt. At the same time, the administration downplayed the escalating War, diverting away the attention of the American people. As senior officials realized matters were getting worse and worse, public relations made it seem the United States was in full control of this not very important episode. There were no parades for returning veterans. Washington made no calls for victory. Johnson undermined the military by refusing to call up the Army Reserves or the state-based National Guard, because this would draw too much attention to the war. Instead he relied more and more heavily on the draft, which because of educational and occupational exemptions was reaching more and more to poor whites and blacks, who increasingly resented the war they had to fight. American people were indeed paying scant attention until the Viet Cong launched their massive Tet Offensive in early 1968. Militarily the Communists were badly defeated, but suddenly all Americans were shocked into the awareness that they were deeply engaged in a major war. The anti-war movement, up to the end of March no effort on college campuses suddenly took center stage, especially after protesting students were shot down on two college campuses. leading Democrats including Hubert Humphrey and Robert Kennedy protested the war and challenge Johnson for renomination in the 1968 election. Johnson's popularity was collapsing and he pulled out of the race.

==== Nixon, Ford, and Vietnam ====
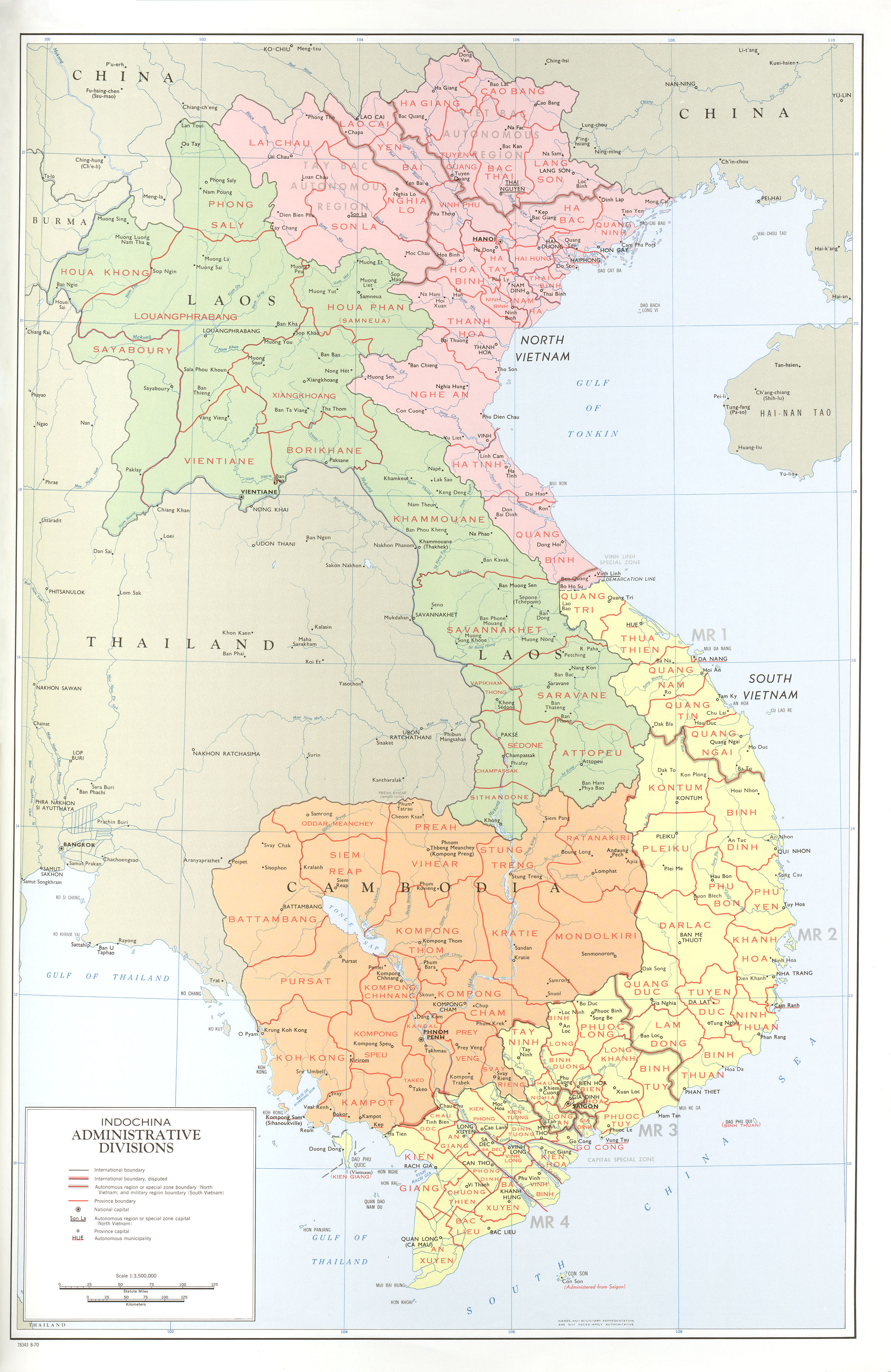
Map of administrative divisions in Indochina, 1970

Nixon more than most presidents integrated his foreign policy and domestic policy with the goal of building of a majority voter coalition. At a time of deep angry divisions especially at the elite level over the war in Vietnam, as well as race relations and generational misunderstandings on sex and gender, his main goal in foreign policy was taking advantage of the profound split between Moscow and Beijing, forcing both sides to curry American favor. He needed both sides to abandon North Vietnam, which both of them did. This opened the way for Nixon's new strategy of Vietnamization. The idea was to create and strengthen a South Vietnam army that could defend its own territory and bring peace with honor as American forces pulled out of Vietnam.

In 1968, Nixon carefully avoided entanglement in Vietnam (Humphrey ridiculed his silence by saying that Nixon was keeping "secret" his plans.) The US was in Vietnam because of its commitment to an obsolete policy of global containment of communism. Nixon's solution in Vietnam was "Vietnamization"—to turn the war over to Saigon, withdrawing all U.S. ground forces by 1971. Ignoring critics who said he was prolonging the war, he set his timetable by the rate at which he could obtain tacit approval from Moscow, Beijing, and Saigon itself. Eventually his policy worked: Saigon did take over the war; there and elsewhere containment was replaced by the "Nixon Doctrine" that countries have to defend themselves. Meanwhile, the antiwar forces on the home front were self-destructing, spinning headlong into violence, drugs, and a radicalism (typified by the Weathermen) that provoked a strong backlash in Nixon's favor. When he saw Mao in Beijing in February 1972, the guerrilla war was virtually over, with the Viet Cong defeated. Hanoi, however, disregarded the advice of its allies and launched its conventional forces in the Easter, 1972, invasion of the South. Saigon fought back, and with strong American air support, routed the communists. Peace was at hand, as Kissinger said, but first Saigon had to be reassured of guaranteed future American support. This assurance came in the Operation Linebacker II air campaign in December 1972, when for the first time in the war Hanoi and its port were attacked. Reeling from the blows, Hanoi signed peace accords in Paris in January 1973, and released all American prisoners. Nixon, having achieved what he pronounced to be "peace with honor," immediately withdrew all US air and naval combat forces and ended the draft; he continued heavy shipments of modern new weapons into South Vietnam despite mounting demands from Congress that all aid be stopped.

Both Moscow and Beijing sharply reduced their military, economic, and diplomatic support for North Vietnam. Hanoi, rapidly losing its outside support, and facing increase American bombing campaigns, finally came to terms. Nixon could announce he had achieved peace. China had suffered for years from Mao's erratic foreign policy which left it without strong supporters. Now it was eager to come to a deal with Nixon. Using Pakistan as an intermediary Henry Kissinger secretly flew to China to negotiate terms. In one of the most dramatic diplomatic episodes in the twentieth century Nixon himself flew to China to seal the deal with Mao Zedong. Moscow as astonished as everyone else by the turnaround, agreed to Nixon's terms regarding extensive previous reducing the risk of nuclear warfare.

As a result of the elaborate maneuvering by Nixon and his top advisor Henry Kissinger, the situation in Vietnam in 1973 saw the withdrawal of all American forces, the buildup of the South Vietnamese Army, and the weakening of the North Vietnamese by the loss of their two critical backers China and the Soviet Union. Nixon promised Saigon heavy support in terms of money and munitions. However Nixon's prestige at home collapsed during the Watergate scandal of 1974, and Congress cut off support to South Vietnam. Republican Gerald Ford, the appointed vice president, replaced Nixon in August 1974, but he was in very weak position in foreign policy terms, has the Republican conservative opposition led by California's Ronald Reagan denounced the next Nixonian policy of détente with Beijing and Moscow. Saigon felt abandoned and lost self-confidence. It was quickly overrun by an invasion from North Vietnam in the spring of 1975. Vietnam, victorious, fought a punishing short war with China in 1979.

=== Cambodia: Khmer Republic (1970–1975) and Khmer Rouge (1975–1979) ===
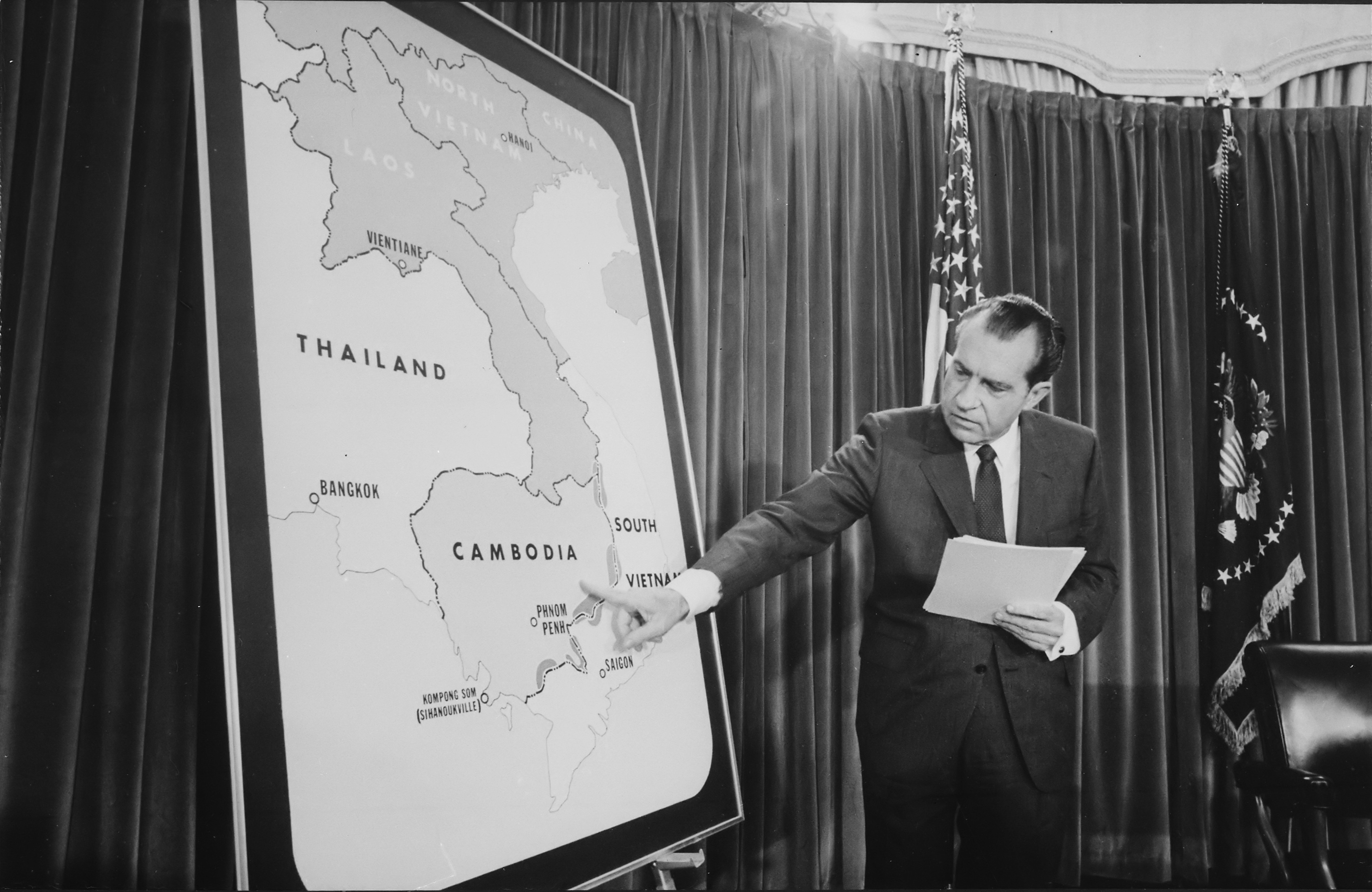
Richard Nixon explains the expansion of the Vietnam War into Cambodia

During the Vietnam War, Vietnamese and Cambodian communists had formed an alliance to fight U.S.-backed governments in their respective countries. Despite their cooperation with the Vietnamese, the Khmer Rouge leadership feared that the Vietnamese communists were planning to form an Indochinese federation, which would be dominated by Vietnam. In May 1975, the newly formed Democratic Kampuchea began attacking Vietnam, beginning with an attack on the Vietnamese island of Phú Quốc. By the end of 1978, Vietnamese leaders decided to remove the Khmer Rouge-dominated government of Democratic Kampuchea, perceiving it as being pro-Chinese and hostile towards Vietnam.

=== Malaya ===
==== Malayan Emergency (1948–1960) ====
The Malayan Emergency (1948–1960) was a guerrilla war fought in the Federation of Malaya (now Malaysia) between communist pro-independence fighters of the Malayan National Liberation Army (MNLA), the Malayan Communist Party's (MCP) armed wing, and the armed forces of Great Britain and the British Commonwealth. The communists sought independence and a socialist economy. The British with the help of the US fought to defeat the expansion of communism and protect British economic and geopolitical interests. The fighting spanned both the colonial period and the creation of an independent Malaya in 1957. According to Michael Sullivan, The British commander General Gerald Templer (1898–1979) argued that traditional combat would not win. He redirected the British effort from winning battles to winning popular support by providing relief, social change, and economic stability. Militarily he concentrated on small-unit anti-guerrilla operations. The British finally won by cutting off supply and retreat avenues for the guerrillas.

==== Communist insurgency (1968–1989) ====
The communist insurgency was a guerrilla war waged between the Malayan Communist Party (MCP) and Malaysian federal security forces. Following the end of the Malayan Emergency in 1960, the predominantly ethnic Chinese Malayan National Liberation Army, armed wing of the MCP, had retreated to the Malaysian–Thailand border where it had regrouped and retrained for future offensives against the Malaysian government. Major fighting broke out in June 1968. The conflict also coincided with renewed domestic tensions between ethnic Malays and Chinese in Peninsular Malaysia and regional military tensions due to the Vietnam War.

While the Malayan Communist Party received some limited support from China, this support ended when the two governments established diplomatic relations in June 1974. In 1970, the MCP experienced a schism which led to the emergence of two breakaway factions: the Communist Party of Malaya–Marxist-Leninist (CPM–ML) and the Revolutionary Faction (CPM–RF). Despite efforts by the MCP to appeal to much larger population of ethnic Malays, the organisation was dominated by Chinese Malaysians throughout the war.

The insurgency came to an end on 2 December 1989 when the MCP signed a peace accord with the government. This coincided with the Revolutions of 1989 and the collapse of several prominent communist regimes worldwide. Besides the fighting on the Malay Peninsula, another long-running communist insurgency was suppressed in the Malaysian state of Sarawak in the island of Borneo.

=== Indonesia ===
Mao forged an alliance with Sukarno's government in Indonesia in the early 1960s. His strategy was to win over Third World countries in the face of competition with the Soviet Union. In Southeast Asia, Mao had the advantage of strong ethnic ties to the 2-million-member Chinese element in Java. He was driven by an ideological commitment to the Maoist version grass roots efforts to further the communist movement. Meanwhile, the Soviet Union kept up with its Chinese rival by provided large supplies of warplanes, small warships, and advanced military hardware.

Sukarno was enabled to threaten the emerging state of Malaysia in what is known as the "Konfrontasi" He swore to destroy Malaysia because it included territory that Indonesia also claimed. He launched multiple small scale operations such as stopping trade with Singapore, sending guerrillas into Malaysian territory in Borneo (Sabah and Sarawak), and sending in light commando raids across the Malacca Straits. The 1957 Anglo-Malayan Defence Agreement committed Britain, Australia, and New Zealand to the defence of Malaya. In response to Sukarno, Britain, along with Australia and New Zealand, sent in naval and air forces as well as infantry. Under the leadership of D. N. Aidit, the Communist Party of Indonesia (the PKI) became the third largest in the world after those in China and the Soviet Union. It was the largest party in Indonesia and pushed Sukarno further and further to the left, despite growing opposition from Muslim conservatives and the army. On September 30, 1965, a military coup attempt killed six senior anti-communist generals. However, in a quick response General Suharto led a major anti-communist coup that overthrew Sukarno and massacred hundreds of thousands of PKI supporters, including Aidit and the top leadership, while another 200,000 Chinese fled Indonesia. Washington did not directly participate.

The new Indonesian government made peace with Malaysia, although it continued anti-imperialistic rhetoric against the British. Despite its military successes, Britain found itself overextended; furthermore by committing itself to defending Malaysia instead of South Vietnam it alienated Washington.

=== Thailand and Laos ===
After World War II, Thailand was one of the few countries in South East Asia without an anti-colonial movement, and with an elite that were instinctively anti-communist. As such US officials opted to build Thailand up as a bastion against communism. In 1950 Thailand sent troops to the Korean War, and started to receive US aid. In 1954, Thailand joined the Southeast Asia Treaty Organization (SEATO) to become an active ally of the United States in the Cold War. In 1962 came the Rusk-Thanat Agreement in which the U.S. promised to defend Thailand and fund its military. Thailand became the main launching point for 80 percent of American bombing campaigns during the Vietnam War. In 1966–1968, the 25,000 Americans stationed in Thailand launched an average of 1500 sorties a week. In addition, 11,000 Thai soldiers served in South Vietnam, and 22,000 fought in Laos.

== South and West Asia ==
=== India ===
Until the early 1970s, India was neutral in the Cold War, and was a key leader in the worldwide Non-Aligned Movement. However, in 1971, it began a loose alliance with the Soviet Union, as Pakistan was allied to the United States and China. India became a nuclear-weapon state, with its first nuclear test in 1974. India had territorial disputes with China which in 1962 escalated into the Sino-Indian War. It had major disputes and with Pakistan which resulted in wars in 1947, 1965, 1971 and 1999.

From the late 1920s on, Jawaharlal Nehru, who had a long-standing interest in world affairs among independence leaders, formulated the Congress Party stance on international issues. As Prime Minister and Minister of External Affairs 1947–1964, Nehru controlled India's approach to the world. India's international influence varied over the years. It gained prestige and moral authority in the 1950s because of its moralistic leadership of the nonaligned movement. However Cold War politics became intertwined with interstate relations. It was too close to Moscow to be nonaligned.

==== Seizure of Portuguese colony of Goa ====
For years India demanded that Portugal turn over its old colony of Goa on the west coast. Portugal tried and failed to get serious diplomatic support from NATO and the U.S. To protect his pacifistic reputation Nehru attacked Portugal's poor record of colonial mismanagement and its status as the last imperial power. Therefore, he rallied the nonaligned nations at Bandung in 1955 to denounce colonialism.

Finally in December 1961, Nehru sent in 45,000 troops against 3500 defenders and annexed Goa with few casualties. After the event the UN debated the issue in early 1962. The U.S. delegate, Adlai Stevenson, strongly criticised India's use of force, stressing that such resort to violent means was against the charter of the UN. He stated that condoning such acts of armed forces would encourage other nations to resort to similar solutions to their own disputes, and would lead to the death of the United Nations. In response, the Soviet delegate, Valerian Zorin, argued that the Goan question was wholly within India's domestic jurisdiction and could not be considered by the Security Council. He also drew attention to Portugal's disregard for UN resolutions calling for the granting of independence to colonial countries and peoples. In the end the Soviet veto prevented any UN action, but only a few countries besides the Soviet bloc and the Arab states supported India.

==== India and USSR ====
Stalin wanted the Indian independence movement to emphasize on class conflict, but instead it stressed on bourgeois nationalism along with British-style socialism. After the death of Stalin in 1953, the new leaders in Moscow decided to work with bourgeoisie nationalists like Nehru in order to minimize American influence. India and the Soviet Union (USSR) built a strong strategic, military, economic and diplomatic relationship. After 1960 both were hostile to China and its ally Pakistan. It was the most successful of the Soviet attempts to foster closer relations with Third World countries. Nehru had complete control of foreign policy; he went the Soviet Union in June 1955, and Soviet leader Nikita Khrushchev made a return visit in the fall of 1955. Khrushchev announced that the Soviet Union supported Indian sovereignty over Kashmir against Pakistan's claims, and also over Portuguese claims to Goa.

Khrushchev's closeness with India was one more ingredient in Beijing's complaints about Moscow. The Soviet Union declared its neutrality during the 1959 border dispute and the Sino-Indian war of October 1962. By 1960 India had received more Soviet military assistance than China had, to Mao's anger. In 1962 Moscow agreed to transfer technology to co-produce the Mikoyan-Gurevich MiG-21 jet fighter in India, which had earlier been denied to China.

In 1965–1966, Soviet Premier Alexei Kosygin served successfully as peace broker between India and Pakistan to end the Indian-Pakistani border war of 1965.

In 1971, East Pakistan - supported by India - rebelled against West Pakistan. India secured the support of the Soviet Union, including protection against Chinese intervention, in August 1971 with the Indo-Soviet Treaty of Friendship and Cooperation before openly entering the conflict in December 1971. In the ensuing Indo-Pakistani War of 1971, India defeated Pakistan and East Pakistan became independent as Bangladesh.

Relations between the Soviet Union and India did not suffer much during the big tent Janata Party's coalition government in 1977–1979, although India did move to establish better economic and military relations with Western countries. To counter these efforts by India to diversify its relations, the Soviet Union proffered additional weaponry and economic assistance. Indira Gandhi returned to power in early 1980 and resumed close relations. She was conspicuous in the Third World for not criticizing the Soviet invasion underway in Afghanistan.

When Indira Gandhi was assassinated in 1984, her son Rajiv Gandhi replaced her and continued the close relationship with Moscow. Indicating the high priority of relations with the Soviet Union in Indian foreign policy, the new Indian Prime Minister, Rajiv Gandhi, visited the Soviet Union on his first state visit abroad in May 1985 and signed two long-term economic agreements with the Soviet Union. He avoided public criticism of the Soviet invasion of Afghanistan. When Mikhail Gorbachev became the leader in Moscow his first visit to a Third World state was to New Delhi in late 1986. Gorbachev unsuccessfully urged Rajiv Gandhi to help the Soviet Union set up an Asian collective security system. Gorbachev's advocacy of this proposal, which had also been made by Leonid Brezhnev, was an indication of continuing Soviet interest in using close relations with India as a means of containing China. With the improvement of Sino-Soviet relations in the late 1980s, containing China had less of a priority, but close relations with India remained important as an example of Gorbachev's new Third World policy.

=== Pakistan ===
Since its independence in 1947, Pakistan's foreign policy has encompassed difficult relations with the neighbouring Soviet Union (USSR) who maintained a close military and ideological interaction with the neighbouring countries such as Afghanistan and India. During most of 1947–1991, the USSR support was given to India, over which it has fought three wars on Kashmir conflict.

Pakistan first aligned itself with the Western Bloc during the 1950s a few years after gaining independence in 1947. Pakistan took part in the Korean War and Suez Crisis on the side of the Western Bloc. Pakistan joined SEATO and CENTO in 1954 and 1955 respectively. During the 1960s Pakistan was closely aligned to the United States; receiving economic and military assistance. Pakistan was important for the US because of its strategic location close to the Soviet Union and bordering China.

In the early 1970s, Pakistan was engaged in a war with India during which the Soviets supported the latter. With limited and less assistance and military and diplomatic aid during the war Pakistan's relation with the U.S. was hindered for the next decade. The ongoing war with India resulted in the secession of East Pakistan and Pakistan lost the privilege of being a member of SEATO. With the growing Soviet influence in the region, Pakistan cemented close security relations with China during most of the Cold War. While Pakistan had "on-off relations" with the United States, Pakistan assisted Nixon's 1972 visit to China. Pakistan was a strategic ally for the US in 1979 during the Iranian Revolution and during the Russian/ Afghanistan conflict in the same year.

Relations with the United States cycled through varying levels of friendliness, but Pakistan consistently found themselves on the United States side of issues faced during the Cold War. Pakistan served as a geostrategic position for United States military bases during the Cold War since it bordered the Soviet Union and China.

=== Bangladesh ===
Following the Bengal Partition in 1947, the eastern part of the Bengal Province would end up as part of Pakistan and be named "East Bengal" (until 1955, when it would be renamed to East Pakistan), there would be many Bengalis who would protest against Pakistani rule in Bengal due to the Pakistani government not recognizing Bengali as an official language, Bengali groups like the Rastrabhasa Sangram Parishad and Shorbodolio Kendrio Rashtrobhasha Kormi Parishad would be established which would be very influential in the Bengali language movement.

From 1949 to 1950 there would also be a communist peasant revolt in Nachole Upazila which the Pakistani government would respond to by sending 2,000 soldiers and police officers to support the local Jotedars against the peasants and communist activists, the peasants would be violently repressed against until the East Bengal State Acquisition and Tenancy Act of 1950 would be passed which would end the revolt.

In 1971, Bengali nationalist, Sheikh Mujibur Rahman, would declare independence for Bengal as "Bangladesh" and Yahya Khan would order the Pakistani Army to restore Pakistani authority in Bengal, leading to the Bangladesh Liberation War. In which Pakistan would be supported by the United States while the Mukti Bahini would be supported by India and the Soviet Union. India became the first country to recognize Bangladesh as a country on Dec. 6, 1971.

==== Communist insurgency ====
Just a year after Bangladesh's independence, in 1972, a conflict would break out between the Bangladeshi government and the communist party, Jatiya Samajtantrik Dal. The Maoist party, Purba Banglar Sarbahara Party, would also join the conflict in April 1973. The Awami League's paramilitary wing, the Jatiya Rakkhi Bahini, would be formed to specifically counter the communist insurgents, though they would commit multiple human rights abuses. The conflict would lead to the assassination of Sheikh Mujibur Rahman, later on 3 November 1975, pro-Mujib officers would oust Khondaker Mostaq Ahmed out of presidency in a bloodless coup, then a bloody counter-coup would be done by the communist Biplobi Shainik Sangstha and Jatiya Samajtantrik Dal on 7 November 1975. By the end of the conflict on 24 November 1975 at least 5,000 people would be dead.

=== Sri Lanka ===
Ceylon at first was closely tied to Great Britain, which awarded independence in 1947 in a friendly manner. The Royal Navy maintained a major naval base; trade with Britain dominated the economy. Under Prime Minister S. W. R. D. Bandaranaike (1956–1959) Ceylon moved away from the West and closed the British base. It became prominent in the non-aligned movement under prime minister Sirimavo Bandaranaike. (1960–1965). The rise of Sinhalese Buddhist nationalism led to a name change to Sri Lanka, a loss of influence by the British oriented elite, and repression the Tamil minority. Civil war erupted, lasting to 2009. India offered to mediate and sent 45,000 troops to neutralize the Liberation Tigers of Tamil Eelam (LTTE), the Tamil army. After 1970 China provided economic and military aid, and purchased rubber. China's goal was to limit the growth of Indian and Soviet power in South Asia.

=== Afghanistan ===
==== USSR ====
The Afghanistan War (1978–92) was a civil war in Afghanistan that pitted the Soviet Union and its Afghan allies against a coalition of anti-Communist groups called the mujahideen, supported from the outside by the United States, Pakistan, and Saudi Arabia. The war ended the détente period of the Cold War. It climaxed in a humiliating defeat for the Soviets, who pulled out in 1989, and for their clients who were overthrown in 1992.

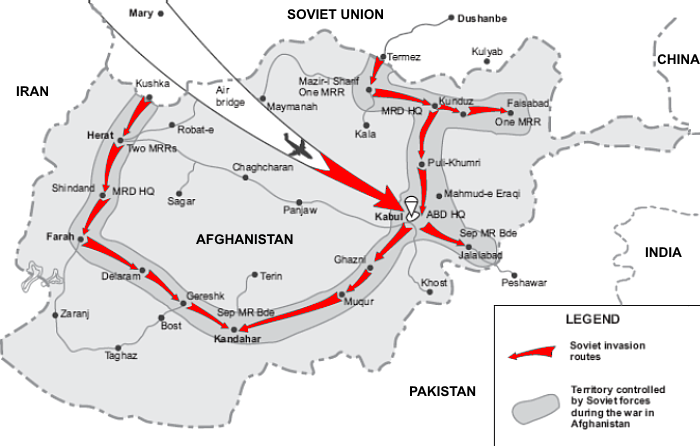
Map of Soviet movements in the 1979 Soviet invasion of Afghanistan

The world was stunned in 1979 when the Soviets sent their army into Afghanistan, which had always been neutral and uninvolved. The UN General Assembly voted by 104 to 18 with 18 abstentions to "strongly deplore" the "recent armed intervention" and demanded the "total withdrawal of foreign troops".

The Afghanistan crisis began in April 1978 with a coup d'état replacing the old regime with the Marxist People's Democratic Party of Afghanistan (PDPA) called the Saur Revolution. They tried to impose scientific socialism on a country that did not want to be modernized—indeed, which was heading in the opposite direction under the lure of Muslim fundamentalism of the sort that had topped the Shah in next-door Iran. Disobeying orders from Moscow, the coup leaders systematically executed the leadership of the large Parcham clan, thus guaranteeing a civil war among the country's many feuding ethnic groups. In addition, the communists in Afghanistan were themselves bitterly divided between the Khalq and Parcham factions. Moscow confronted a quandary. Afghanistan had been neutralized for sixty years, and had never been part of the Cold War system. Now it appeared that radical fundamentalist Muslims, supported by Pakistan and Iran, and probably by China and the United States, were about to seize power. The communist regime in Kabul had no popular support; its 100,000-man army had fallen apart and was worthless. Only the Soviet army could possibly quell the growing rebellion by Parcham, the fundamentalist "mujahideen", and allied tribes who opposed the anti-religious, feminist modernizers.

The Kremlin never realized the dangers involved and did not have even a basic understanding of the forces they confronted. According to Leninist principles, Afghanistan was not ready for revolution in the first place. Furthermore, intervention would destroy détente with the United States and Western Europe. Factions within the PDPA that were hostile to Soviet interests gained ascendancy and raised the specter of an independently minded Communist state located on the southern border that might cause future trouble inside the Muslim parts of the USSR. At this point Moscow decided not to send troops but instead stepped up shipments of military equipment such as artillery, armored personnel carriers and 48,000 machine guns; they also sent 100,000 tons of wheat.

Moscow's first man in Kabul was prime minister Nur Muhammad Taraki (1913–1979), who was murdered and replaced by his deputy Hafizullah Amin (1929–1979) of the Khalq faction in September 1979. Although Amin called himself a loyal communist, and begged for more Soviet military intervention, Moscow thought Amin was planning to double-cross them and switch over to China and the U.S. They therefore double crossed him first. Moscow had Amin officially invite the Soviet Army to enter Afghanistan; it did so in December 1979, and it immediately executed Amin and installed a Soviet puppet Babrak Karmal (1929–1996), the leader of the more moderate Parcham faction of the PDPA. Pressure for intervention seems to have come primarily from the KGB (secret police), whose efforts to assassinate Amin had failed, and from the Red Army, which perhaps was worried about the danger of a mutiny on the part of its many Muslim soldiers.

==== World reaction ====
In July 1979, before the Soviet invasion, President Jimmy Carter for the first time authorized the CIA to start assisting the Mujahideen rebels with money and non-military supplies sent via Pakistan. As soon as the Soviets invaded in December, 1979, Carter, disgusted at the collapse of détente and alarmed at the rapid Soviet gains, terminated progress on arms limitations, slapped a grain embargo on the USSR, withdrew from the 1980 Moscow Olympics, and (with near-unanimous support in Congress) sent the CIA in to arm, train and finance the Mujahideen rebels. The US had strong support from Britain, Pakistan and Saudi Arabia, all of whom feared the Soviet invasion was the first step in a grand move south toward the oil-rich Persian Gulf. Carter enlarged his position into the "Carter Doctrine," by which the US announced its intention to defend the Gulf. Historians now believe that analysis was faulty and that the Soviets were not planning a grand move, but were concerned with loss of prestige and the possibility of a hostile Muslim regime that might destabilize its largely Muslim southern republics. The boycott of the Olympics humiliated the Soviets, who had hoped the games would validate their claim to moral equality in the world of nations; instead they were pariahs again.

===== American pressure =====
When the USSR invaded in 1979, US President Jimmy Carter ended détente, launched a diplomatic offensive and began sending arms to the opposition forces. When Reagan replaced Carter in 1981, he began a rollback strategy of supporting insurgencies in Nicaragua, Cambodia, Angola, and, above all, in Afghanistan. The goal, especially after 1984, was to bleed Moscow white—to create a Vietnam for them which would suck their military dry. In Moscow the deputy defense minister explained to the Politburo in 1986:

We control Kabul and the provincial centers, but on occupied territory we cannot establish authority....We have lost the battle for the Afghan people.

When Mikhail Gorbachev came to power in Moscow in 1985 he immediately realized the severe drain caused by trying to hold the USSR together by force, especially as Washington was escalating military spending, threatening to build Star Wars, and the Soviet economy was faltering badly as revenues plunged from oil exports. It took him several years to get enough Politburo support, all the time the poor performance and prolonged presence of the Soviet military in Afghanistan created domestic financial and political problems. In 1986 he replaced Karmal with Mohammad Najibullah (1947–1996) the head of the secret police (KHAD) and leader of the Parcham faction. The situation worsened. Gorbachev realized Afghanistan was a losing cause. He had to focus on the internal Soviet crisis. He stopped offensive operations in 1987 and withdrew the last of his forces in February 1989.

==== United States ====
Historians have started detailed coverage of the American interest in Afghanistan, from trying to frustrate the Soviets in the 1980s to trying and failing to defeat the Taliban, 2001–2021.

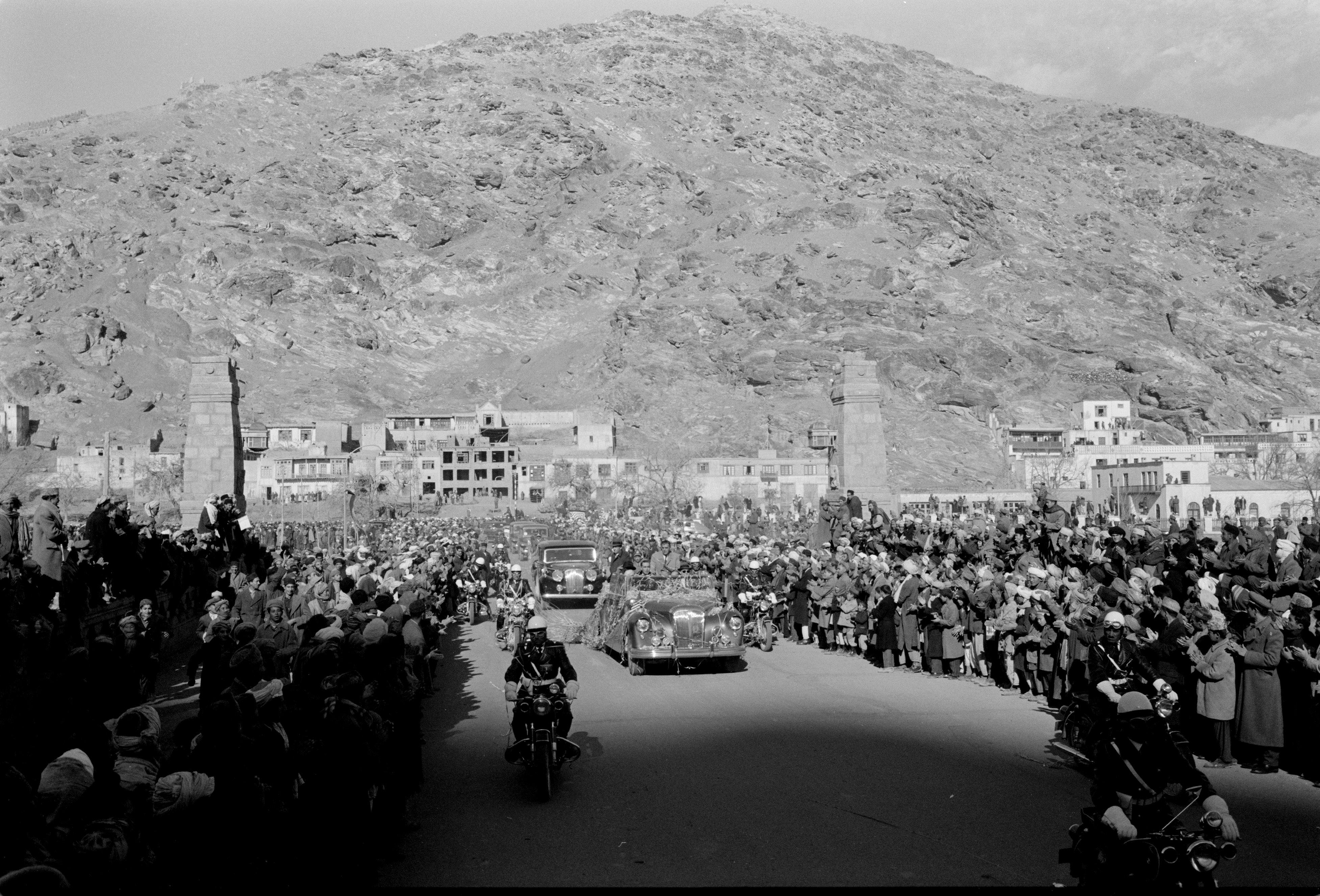
Dwight D. Eisenhower's state visit to Afghanistan on December 9, 1959.

Eisenhower declined Afghanistan's request for defense cooperation but extended an economic assistance program focused on the development of Afghanistan's physical infrastructure—roads, dams, and power plants. Later, American aid shifted from infrastructure projects to technical assistance programs to help develop the skills needed to build a modern economy. Contacts between the United States and Afghanistan increased during the 1950s to counter the attraction of communism. After Eisenhower made a state visit to Afghanistan in December 1959 Washington grew confident that Afghanistan was safe from ever becoming a Soviet satellite state. From the 1950s to 1979, U.S. foreign assistance provided Afghanistan with more than $500 million in loans, grants, and surplus agricultural commodities to develop transportation facilities, increase agricultural production, expand the educational system, stimulate industry, and improve government administration. In the 1960s Moscow was sensing that Washington was turning Afghanistan into a satellite state. In 1965, Afghanistan saw the establishment of a Communist party affiliated with Moscow, the People's Democratic Party of Afghanistan (PDPA). By the 1970s, numerous American teachers, engineers, doctors, scholars, diplomats, and explorers had traversed Afghanistan's rugged landscape where they lived and worked. The Peace Corps was active in Afghanistan between 1962 and 1979. Many other American programs were running in the country such as CARE, American Scouting overseas (Afghanistan Scout Association), USAID, and others.

==== Left-wing government, Soviet invasion and civil war ====
After the Saur Revolution, relations between the two nations became spotty. While the Democratic Republic regime remained officially nonaligned and opened diplomatic relations with the U.S. by June 1978, as time went on Afghanistan's increasing bond in the Soviet orbit was a cause of concern. Secretary of State Cyrus Vance said at the time "We need to take into account the mix of nationalism and communism in the new leadership and seek to avoid driving the regime into a closer embrace with the Soviet Union than it might wish." The new American Ambassador Adolph "Spike" Dubs told a visiting official in August 1978 that a more positive American approach can reduce Soviet influence, adding that while Afghanistan would still have a pro-Soviet tilt, "it would not be a Soviet satellite, military or otherwise." Dubs also felt that Hafizullah Amin "can't go as far as Tito or even Ceausescu".

In February 1979, Ambassador Dubs was murdered in Kabul after Afghan security forces burst in on his kidnappers, leading to a deterioration in relations. The U.S. then reduced bilateral assistance and terminated a small military training program. At the same time, the deteriorating internal situation in Afghanistan caused the U.S. to warn the Soviet Union not to intervene. Following Amin's rise as General Secretary, he publicly expressed his desire for friendly relations with the U.S. As the rebellion spread and the security situation deteriorated, U.S. authorities decided on 23 July 1979, to evacuate the families of American nationals in Afghanistan.

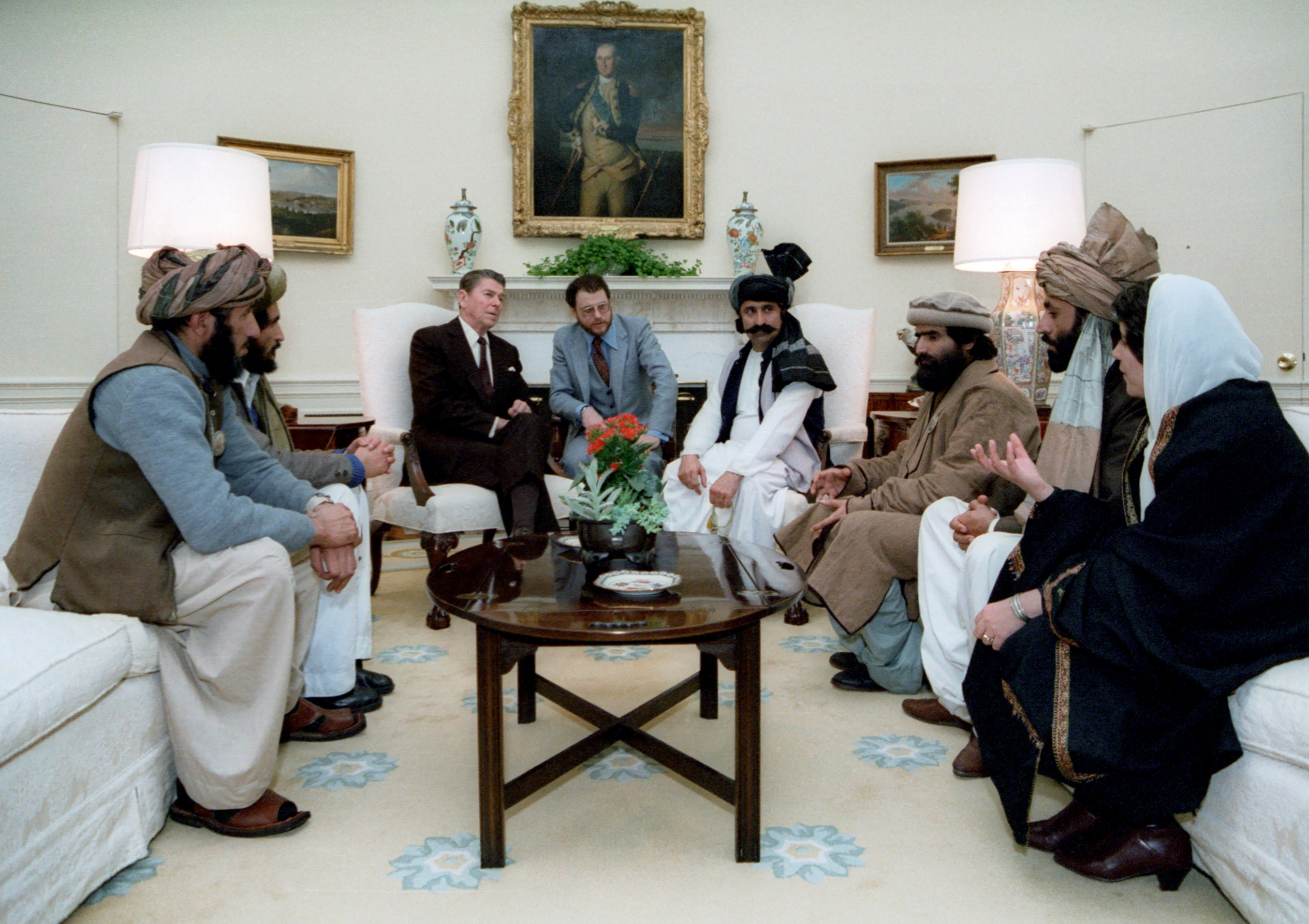
Ronald Reagan meeting members of the Afghan mujahideen in the Oval Office in 1983

The Soviet invasion of Afghanistan became a major concern for the United States, with President Jimmy Carter calling it a "clear threat to the peace". Following the invasion, the United States supported diplomatic efforts to achieve a Soviet withdrawal. In addition, generous American contributions to the refugee program in Pakistan played a major part in efforts to assist Afghan refugees. American efforts also included helping the population living inside Afghanistan. This cross-border humanitarian assistance program aimed at increasing Afghan self-sufficiency and helping resist Soviet attempts to drive civilians out of the rebel-dominated countryside. During the period of Soviet occupation of Afghanistan, the U.S. provided about 3 billion US dollars in military and economic assistance to the Afghan mujahideen groups stationed on the Pakistani side of the Durand Line. The U.S. Embassy in Kabul was closed in January 1989 for security reasons.

The United States welcomed the new Islamic administration that came to power in April 1992 after the fall of the former Soviet-backed government. After this, the Mujahideen groups that won, started a civil war amongst themselves, but the United States's attention was away from Afghanistan at the time.

==== Taliban comes to power ====
The Taliban in 1996 won the Afghan Civil War (1992–1996). As with almost every other country in the world, Washington refused to recognize the new "Islamic Emirate of Afghanistan", the official name of the radical Islamist government established by the Taliban. It continued supporting the Northern Alliance as the legitimate government. Washington did have informal contacts with the Taliban, but relations worsened after Osama bin Laden's fatwā declaring war on the United States and the 1998 United States embassy bombings. After Operation Infinite Reach, Mullah Mohammed Omar made a telephone call to the U.S. State Department demanding that President Bill Clinton resign. The United States refused to provide aid or recognition to the Taliban government unless it expelled bin Laden, which it refused to do under the pashtunwali code demanding that guests be offered sanctuary. After a 20-year war waged by the U.S. and NATO partners, the Taliban suddenly took control of the country in summer 2021, as the Afghan army, police and national government suddenly fled. Over 120,000 Afghan supporters of many different anti-Taliban programs were evacuated amidst chaos, and thousands were left behind to an uncertain fate.

=== Middle East ===
Lawrence Freedman, A choice of enemies: America confronts the Middle East (Hachette, 2010) provides detailed coverage of Washington's complex relations with the critical region of Jews and Arabs, Sunnis and Shias, and massive oil supplies.

== See also ==
- History of Asia
- Cold War
- Sino-Soviet relations
- Sino-Soviet split
- Russia and the Middle East
- India–Russia relations
- India and the Non-Aligned Movement

== Notes ==
=== Works cited ===
- Karnow, Stanley (1991). Vietnam, A History. New York: Viking Press–Random House. ISBN 978-0-670-74604-0.
- Reeves, Richard (1993). President Kennedy: Profile of Power. New York: Simon & Schuster. ISBN 978-0-671-64879-4.
- Tucker, Spencer (2011) [1998]. The Encyclopedia of the Vietnam War: A Political, Social, and Military History. Santa Barbara: ABC-CLIO. ISBN 978-1-85109-960-3.
