= Kuwait–Russia relations =

- Kuwait: Russia

Kuwait–Russia relations refer to the bilateral relationship between Kuwait and Russia.

Prior to the Gulf War, Kuwait was the only "pro-Soviet" state in the Persian Gulf region. Kuwait acted as a conduit for the Soviets to the other Gulf states and Kuwait was used to demonstrate the benefits of a pro-Soviet stance. Kuwait has an embassy in Moscow and Russia has an embassy in Kuwait City.

== Background ==
=== Russian Empire relations ===
In the beginning of the 20th century, the Russian Empire sought to expand its international presence by creating new spheres of influence, and the Empire looked to the Arab world. Russian interest in the region was twofold. Inroads were made by the Empire in Persia, and there was increasing rivalry between the French and British in the region. Britain had suffered major setbacks in the Boer War, and its colonial rivals sought to capitalise upon the position of the British which was increasingly undermined in the region. The Russians were also further motivated to increase their presence in the region, as both the Russians and Arabs shared a common hostility towards the Ottoman Empire. At the same time, the German Empire was planning to build a railway which would ultimately link Baghdad with Berlin, which was planned to terminate in Kuwait.

In 1899 the German cruiser Arkona appeared in the Persian Gulf, which was mistaken by the British to be a Russian warship. Upon hearing of this, the Russian envoy to Tehran made a recommendation that the Empire should send a warship to the Persian Gulf. Tsar Nicholas II approved the decision to send the gunboat Gilyak. Vladimir Lambsdorff, the Russian Foreign Minister, wrote to Pyotr Tyrtov, the head of the Ministry of the Navy explaining that the purpose of sending the Gilyak was to show the British and local authorities that by flying the Russian flag in the Persian Gulf, the Empire regards the Persian Gulf as being open to vessels of all nations, and that there was no aggressive intent nor plans for terrorial acquisitions. When the Gilyak arrived in Kuwait in February 1900, the British attempted to stop the Emir of Kuwait, Mubarak Al-Sabah, from meeting the Russians, but he did travel from the desert to greet the Russians, whom he saw as an ally against Britain. Extensive discussions with the Russians led to Mubarak in the spring of 1901 asking for Russian protection; only 2 years after he had agreed to become a British protectorate, although Russian sources indicate that the request was turned down to avoid antagonising the British.

In April 1900 the Russians had plans to open a regular steamship line between Odessa and ports in the Persian Gulf, leading them to open consulates in Basra and Bushehr. The protected cruiser Varyag sailed into Kuwait on 8 December 1901, and Jabir bin Mubarak, the son of the Emir, boarded the vessel to greet the visitors. The Emir was in Jahra preparing for an expected Wahabi attack, and the ship's officers were taken to Jahra, where they were warmly met by the Emir and were informed that he would turn to Russia for help if Kuwait were to be in danger, and that the Emir would like to see as many Russian ships in Kuwait as possible. The visit of the Varyag was a success, and the Russians left the Persian Gulf leaving the impression of naval superiority over their British rivals.

After the visit of the Varyag, the next Russian to have an audience with the Emir was N.V. Bogoyavlensky, a zoologist, who was engaging in research in the region for the Society of Lovers of Natural Science, Anthropology and Ethnography of Moscow University. Upon meeting the Russian, the Emir was reported as telling the zoologist, "I believe the Russians are friends. I am happy to play host to them. I am always ready to do everything I can for them."

On 1 December 1902, the protected cruiser Askold sailed into Kuwait, and was met by Jabir bin Mubarak and his son Ahmad. The Russians noted that whilst the Ottoman flag flew in front of their palaces, the Sheikh did not recognise the Sultan's authority and paid him no tribute. The Boyarin arrived in Kuwait on 20–23 February 1903, along with the French cruiser Infernet. The purpose of the joint visit was to demonstrate to the British the unity and power of the French–Russian alliance, although the French feared a Russian presence in the Persian Gulf, which was evident by their refusal to allow the Russians to utilise their coal-bunkering station in Muscat. This led to the Russians wanting to establish such a facility in Kuwait, however, by the end of 1903, Russian attention turned away from the Persian Gulf towards events in the Far East which eventually led to the Russo-Japanese War.

=== Soviet-era relations ===
Kuwait gained independence from the United Kingdom on 19 June 1961, and applied for membership of the United Nations. The Soviet Union vetoed the admission of the newly independent State on 7 July 1961. Kuwait again applied for membership in November 1961, and again the Soviets vetoed the admission of the country in the United Nations Security Council, based on an argument that Kuwait was not yet fit to be seen as an independent State, and also due to their opinion that the 1961 treaty with the United Kingdom submitted the Persian Gulf state to foreign political influence. The Soviet attitude towards Kuwait was ultimately guided by its cordial relations with Iraq, which had long held territorial ambitions towards Kuwait. When the Iraqi leader Abd al-Karim Qasim was overthrown in a coup d'état on 8 February 1963, Moscow's relations with Baghdad deteriorated, leading to a warmer attitude towards Kuwait. This led to the two countries establishing diplomatic relations on 11 March 1963. Kuwait saw the establishment of relations as an insurance policy, of sorts, against new Iraqi territorial ambitions, and Russia saw the relationship as a bridge between the Persian Gulf and the Indian Ocean. In the years that followed, relations between the Soviet Union and Kuwait were not always cordial, which was exemplified by Premier of the Soviet Union Nikita Khrushchev making disparaging remarks towards the Kuwaiti leadership whilst on a state visit to Egypt in March 1964.

Relations began to improve when Leonid Brezhnev became the Soviet leader in October 1964; however, in the 1973 Kuwait–Iraq Sanita border skirmish, Russia favored Iraq over Kuwait. In the latter part of the 1970s, relations became more cordial. The Soviets supported the Kuwaiti's nationalisation of its oil industry, and the two countries shared similar views on foreign policy issues, in particular in relation to the Arab–Israeli conflict. Kuwait appreciated Soviet support for the Palestinians, and after the outbreak of the Iran–Iraq War, the country began to support Soviet proposals in the Persian Gulf after recognising that the Soviet presence in the Persian Gulf was of a stabilising nature, and also as Moscow acted as a guarantor against Iraqi or Iranian aggression. This led to Kuwait actively lobbying members of the Gulf Cooperation Council to establish diplomatic relations with the Soviets, ending the diplomatic isolation of the superpower amongst the countries on the Arabian Peninsula; for most of the Cold War, Kuwait was one of only two countries which maintained such relations with the Soviet Union.

Prior to the Gulf War, Kuwait was the only "pro-Soviet" Persian Gulf state. Kuwait acted as a conduit for the Soviets to the other Gulf states and Kuwait was used to demonstrate the benefits of a pro-Soviet stance. In 1987, after U.S.A refused to supply Stingers, Kuwait signed a 327 million dollar deal with Soviet Union for the purchase of surface-to-air and surface-to-surface missiles, tanks and other military equipment. Reportedly, Soviet experts would assemble and operate military equipment and train Kuwaiti personnel.

After the August 1990 invasion of Kuwait by Iraqi forces, due to Iraqi demands, the Soviet Union evacuated its embassy in Kuwait. A spokesman for the Soviet Foreign Ministry noted that the embassy, under international law, was still open, albeit vacant, and that the evacuation of the 882 Soviets in Kuwait did not alter the Soviet stance on the illegality of the Iraqi invasion. The President of the Soviet Union Mikhail Gorbachev explained that the Iraqi invasion of Kuwait had created an "extraordinary and extremely dangerous" situation in Persian Gulf. Furthermore, Gorbachev warned Iraqi President Saddam Hussein that refusal to abide by United Nations Security Council resolutions would see the Council introducing further measures against Iraq.

== Russian Federation relations ==
=== Diplomatic ties ===
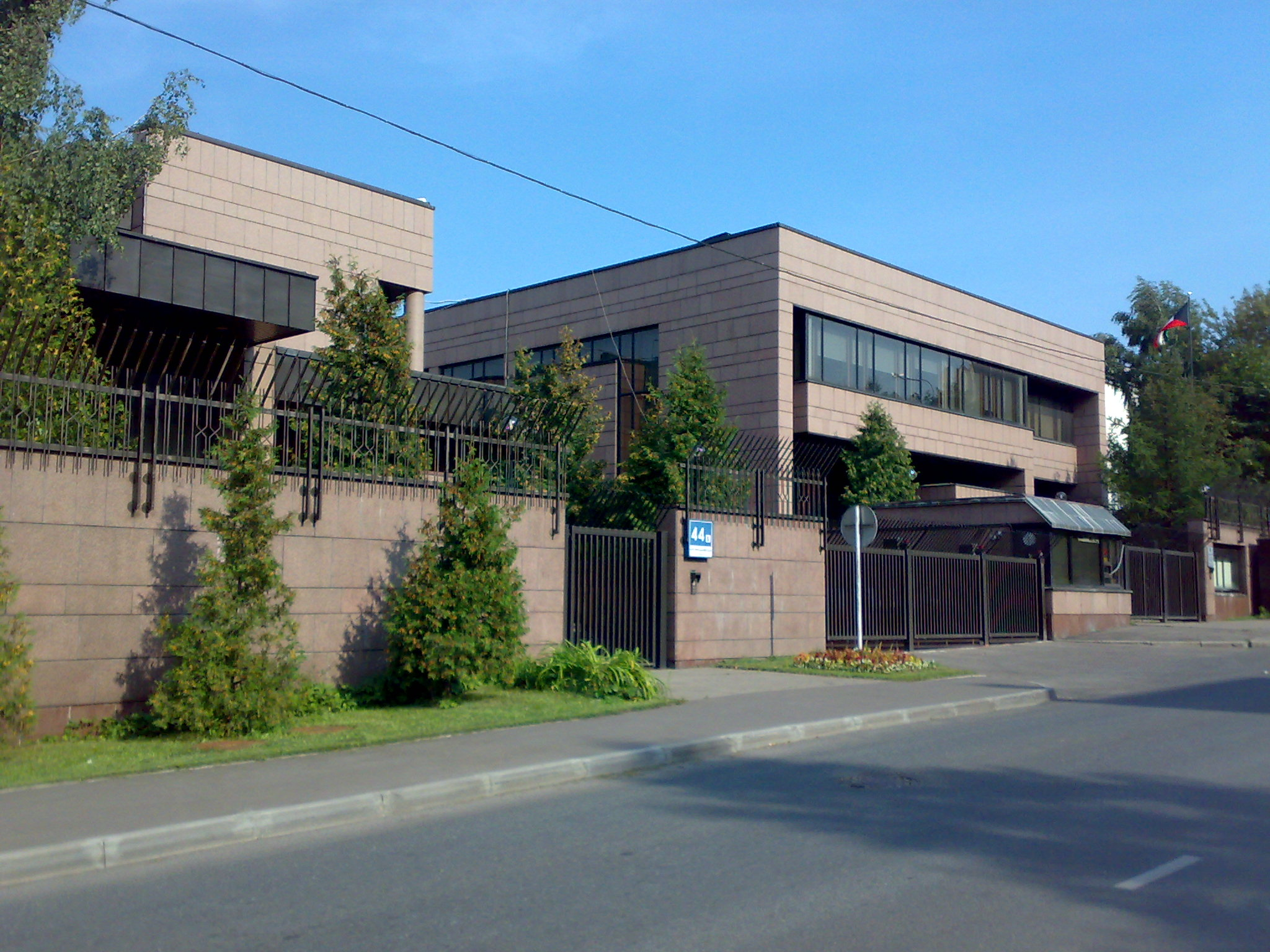
Embassy of Kuwait in Moscow.

On 28 December 1991, Kuwait recognised the Russian Federation as the successor state to the Soviet Union. Russia has an embassy in Kuwait City, and Kuwait has an embassy in Moscow. The current Ambassador of Russia to Kuwait is Mr Alexey Solomatin. The current Ambassador of Kuwait to Russia is Abdulaziz A. Aladwani who presented his credentials to Vladimir Putin on 16 January 2014.

=== Political ties ===
In 1991 the Kuwait Foreign Trading Contracting & Investment Co. extended Vnesheconombank a loan of US$1 billion on a seven-year term. On 30 May 2006, the Russian and Kuwaiti governments agreed to settle the US$1.6 billion debt of the former Soviet Union, with the repayments to take the form of US$1 billion in cash, and US$600 million in goods.

=== Military ties ===
On 29 November 1993, Kuwait became the first Persian Gulf Arab state to sign a military agreement with Russia, which followed joint naval exercises at the end of 1992. In May 1994, Pavel Grachev, the Russian Minister of Defence announced that Kuwait had signed an agreement for the delivery of a number of BMP-3 infantry fighting vehicles and S-300V surface-to-air missiles.

Kuwait was the first Gulf Arab state to sign a military agreement with Russia. In recent years, Russia has established extensive military cooperation with Kuwait.

=== Economic ties ===
Speaking at the 2009 St. Petersburg International Economic Forum, Ahmed Rashid Al Harun, the Kuwaiti Minister of Trade and Industry, noted that relations between the two countries extended over 100 years, and called for the intensification of investment between both countries.

==== Trade statistics ====
In 1998 bilateral trade between Russia and Kuwait amounted to US$400,000, and by the period January—October 2005 this figure had increased to US$22.2 million.

== Resident diplomatic missions ==
- Kuwait has an embassy in Moscow.
- Russia has an embassy in Kuwait City.

== See also ==
- Foreign relations of Kuwait
- Foreign relations of Russia
