= Mikhail Margelov =

Russian politician (born 1964)

- Михаил Маргелов
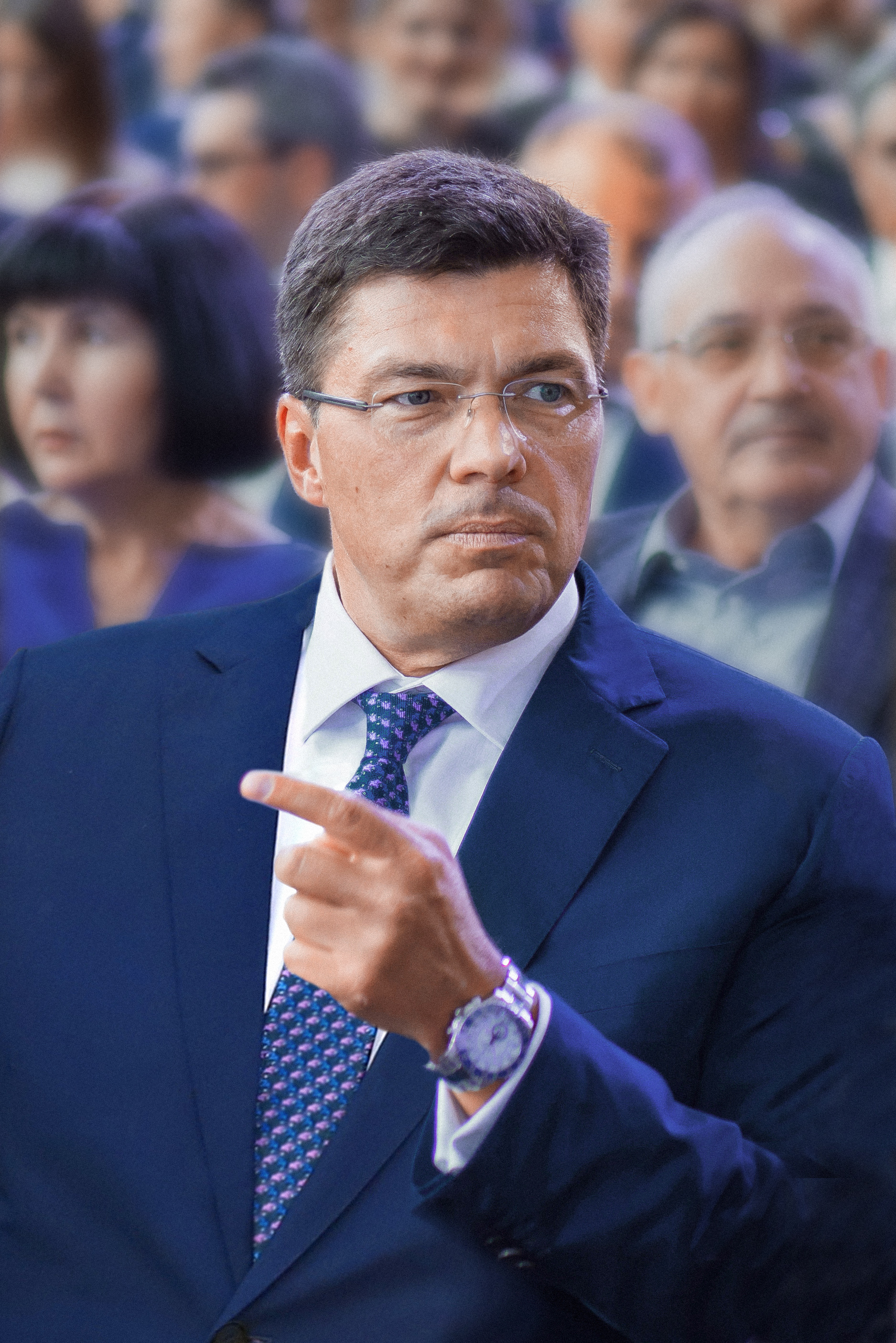
- Margelov in 2018

Vice President of PJSC "Transneft"
- Incumbent
- Assumed office 20 October 2014

Special Representative of the President of the Russian Federation for Cooperation with African Countries
- In office 20 March 2011 – 31 October 2014

4th Chairman of the Federation Council Committee on International Affairs
- In office 14 November 2001 – 26 September 2014
- Preceded by: Mikhail Prusak
- Succeeded by: Konstantin Kosachyov

Special Representative of the President of the Russian Federation for Sudan
- In office 7 October 2008 – 20 March 2011

Head of the Public Relations Office of the President of the Russian Federation
- In office 14 May 1997 – 7 April 1998
- Preceded by: Mikhail Lesin
- Succeeded by: Dmitry Mulchanov

Personal details
- Born: Mikhail Vitalyevich Margelov; 22 December 1964 (age 61) Moscow, Russian SFSR, Soviet Union
- Spouse: Svetlana Margelova
- Children: Dimitriy and Alexey
- Education: Moscow State University

Mikhail Vitalyevich Margelov (Russian: Михаил Витальевич Маргелов; born 22 December 1964), is a Russian public figure and politician, Vice President, JSC “Transneft”, and ex-Chairman of the Foreign Affairs Committee of the Federation Council of Russia. He has been a member of the European Democrat Group in the Parliamentary Assembly of the Council of Europe (PACE) from 2002 until 2009. He has the federal state civilian service rank of 1st class Active State Councillor of the Russian Federation.

== Biography ==
Margelov has worked as an interpreter in the International Department of the Central Committee of the Communist Party of the Soviet Union, taught Arabic at the Higher School of the KGB, and was Senior Editor of the Arab section in the TASS News Agency. He is also fluent in English.

In 1990–1995, he was employed by a number of US consulting companies dealing with investment projects in the Commonwealth of Independent States. In 1995, he became project director for the publicity campaign of Grigory Yavlinsky and the Yabloko party. In 1996, he was chief co-ordinator for advertising for President Boris Yeltsin's 1996 re-election campaign. He went on to head the President's public relations department from November 1996 to May 1998.

Between October 1999 to October 2000, he was a director of the Russian Information Centre (Rosinformcentr), a government agency covering events in the Northern Caucasus From May 1998 to September 1999, he held a managerial position at RIA Novosti news agency. From January to March 2000, Margelov served as a consultant to Vladimir Putin's Electoral Headquarters, in charge of contacts with foreign media.

In PACE, he was a member of the Committee on the Honouring of Obligations and Commitments by Member States of the Council of Europe (Monitoring Committee), the Political Affairs Committee and the Sub-Committee on the Middle East. Having served as the vice-president of the PACE, he was due to be appointed president in 2008. However, he was controversially blocked in what some regarded as an anti-Russian move.

Margelov is the son of Colonel General Vitaly Margelov, a politician and intelligence officer, and the grandson of General Vasily Margelov, a Hero of the Soviet Union. He graduated from the Institute of Asian and African Countries, which is affiliated to Moscow State University.

He is married and has two sons.

== Honours and awards ==
- Order of Honour (19 November 2007) – for services to law-making, strengthening and development of the Russian state
- Pushkin Medal (21 July 2003) – for outstanding contribution to the socio-economic development of the city of Pskov, and in connection with the 1100 anniversary of its foundation
- Medal "In Commemoration of the 850th Anniversary of Moscow" (1997)
- Medal "In Commemoration of the 1000th Anniversary of Kazan" (2005)
- Medal of Merit in conducting national census
- Certificate of Honour of the President of the Russian Federation (17 February 2010) – for services to the development of international cooperation and the many years of diligent work
- By the President of the Russian Federation (30 March 1998) – for active participation in the preparation of the President's Address to the Federal Assembly in 1998
- Honorary medal of the Federation Council, "For merits in the development of parliamentarism"
- Badge "Honorary Worker of the Accounts Chamber of the Russian Federation" (2004) – for services to the development of cooperation with the Accounts Chamber of the Russian Federation
- Medal "For Services to Pskov" (2009)
- Medal "Pro merito" (Parliamentary Assembly of the Council of Europe, 2010) – for his significant contribution to the promotion of democratic values, human rights
- "Woodrow Wilson" Award
