= Russia and the Arab–Israeli conflict =

Beginning in the mid-2000s, the military and diplomatic corps of Russia has had various contacts and relations with entities engaged in the Arab–Israeli conflict, including the Iran–Israel conflict. This is a component of Russia's broader foreign policy across the Middle East.

== Background ==
After 2001, the government of Vladimir Putin intensified Russia's involvement in the region, supporting Iran's nuclear programs and forgiving Syria 73% of its $13 billion debt.

In his September 10, 2004, article Middle East Horizons of Russian Foreign Politics: Russia returns to one of the world's key regions, Mikhail Margelov, the Head of the Foreign Relations Council of the Russian Federation, wrote:

President Putin called for the renewal of contacts with the countries with which Russia maintained long friendly relations and invested a lot of material and intellectual resources. The Arab countries constitute a large part of those counties. ... In general, the positions of Russia and the majority of Arab countries on key issues of development of the political situation in the region coincide."

According to March 2007 brief entitled Russia's New Middle Eastern Policy: Back to Bismarck? by Ariel Cohen (Institute for Contemporary Affairs),

Syria ... was supplying Hizbullah with Russian weapons. In 2006, Israeli forces found evidence of the Russian-made Kornet-E and Metis-M anti-tank systems in Hizbullah's possession in southern Lebanon. The Russian response to accusations that it was supplying terrorist groups with weapons was an announcement, in February 2007, that Russia's military will conduct inspections of Syrian weapons storage facilities with the goal of preventing the weapons from reaching unintended customers. Predictably, such developments placed considerable strain on the already-deteriorating relations between Russia and Israel... For several years Russia has been attempting to engage in military cooperation with both Israel and Syria. However, the levels of cooperation with the two states are inversely related and an escalation of arms sales to Syria can only damage the relationship with Israel. Russian-Syrian military cooperation has gone through numerous stages: high levels of cooperation during the Soviet era, which was virtually halted until 2005, and now Russia's attempt to balance its relationship with both Israel and Syria. However, Russia's recent eastward leanings might indicate that Moscow is prepared to enter a new stage in its military cooperation with Syria, even if this is to the detriment of its relationship with Israel.

== Timeline ==
=== Russia–Hamas talks, 2006 ===
The Russia–Hamas talks of 2006 began on 3 March 2006, when Russian Foreign Minister Sergei Lavrov met with Hamas leader Khaled Meshaal to discuss the future of the Israeli–Palestinian peace process after Hamas became the majority party of the Palestinian National Authority Legislative Council, having won a majority of seats in the Palestinian elections. Hamas is listed as a terrorist organization by Australia, Canada, the European Union, Israel, Japan, the United Kingdom, and the United States, and is banned in Jordan.

On 10 February 2006 Spanish parliament member told Russian President Vladimir Putin, according to Kommersant journalist Andrey Kolesnikov, that Putin does not consider Hamas a terrorist organization.

The perspective of giving legitimacy to Hamas have angered some Israeli officials. A cabinet minister Meir Sheetrit accused Putin of "stabbing Israel in the back". After the interim Israeli Prime Minister Ehud Olmert communicated with Putin, the Israeli position somewhat softened.

In an interview in Russian newspaper Nezavisimaya Gazeta published on 13 February 2006, Mashal said that Hamas would temporarily stop armed struggle against Israel if it recognized the "1967 borders" and withdrew itself from all "Palestinian territories" (including the West Bank and East Jerusalem). He refused to acknowledge the Road map for peace, adopted by the Quartet in June 2003, "since nobody respects it". The Road map projected the establishment of an independent Palestinian state in 2005.

Following Hamas' victory in January 2006, the EU announced that future aid to the Palestinians is tied to "Three Principles" outlined by the international community:

- Hamas must renounce violence
- Hamas must recognize Israel's right to exist
- Hamas must express clear support for the Middle East peace process, as outlined in the Oslo accords.

During the talks in March 2006, Lavrov called on the Hamas to comply with the earlier commitments signed by the PLO, and reiterated these three requirements but Hamas refused.

On 7 March, Russia expressed hope that Hamas would consider supporting the Road map for peace and peace plan proposed by Saudi Arabia, but it did not materialize. Israeli spokesman stated: "They (Hamas) did not accept any of those principles ... therefore I don't know where they (Russia) draw their optimism from Hamas changing its ways."

President Mahmoud Abbas of the Palestinian National Authority said that he would oppose the creation of a Palestinian state with temporary borders and further Israel's unilateral withdrawals.

The invitation and the talks have caused controversy wherein Russia's intentions in changing its views towards the Israeli–Palestinian conflict were questioned in the West.

=== Russian technical, military, and diplomatic aid to Iran ===
In the early 21st century, concerns arose that Israel would attack Iran pre-emptively because the nuclear program of Iran could eventually be used to produce nuclear weapons. Russia provided technical assistance to Iran's nuclear program, supplied it with weapons, and gave it diplomatic support at the United Nations.

In January 2007, Israeli officials voiced "extreme concern" over Russia's sale of advanced anti-aircraft missiles to Iran. They warned: "We hope they understand that this is a threat that could come back to them as well."

Before Prime Minister Ehud Olmert's trip to Russia, Israel's Cabinet voted to recognize Russia's claim to Sergei's Courtyard in central Jerusalem. Russia laid claim to the site, named for the son of a Russian czar, on behalf of the Russian Orthodox Church. In an overture before the trip, Israel's Cabinet voted to recognize Russia's claim to property in Jerusalem. Olmert said he would urge Moscow not to sell sophisticated weapons to Israel's enemies. Iran is interested in buying anti-aircraft missiles that could cripple any military strike against its nuclear program. Israel is also afraid Moscow would sell Syria the same missile defense system. Iranian President Mahmoud Ahmadinejad has frequently called for Israel's destruction, and Israel suspects he means to carry out that objective by developing nuclear bombs with the help of a Russian-built nuclear power plant. Iran says its nuclear program is for peaceful purposes. Iran says it plans to buy from Russia advanced S-300 anti-aircraft missiles that could detect aircraft sent to destroy its nuclear facilities. Syria, which backs Hezbollah guerrillas who battled Israel in Lebanon in 2006, reportedly has asked to buy them, too. Russia has not confirmed the reports. But recently, Russia's foreign minister, Sergey Lavrov, said his government was prepared to sell Syria arms with a "defensive character." Israel claims Russian missiles sold to Syria made their way into the Hezbollah's hands in the 2006 war, though it has not accused Russia of directly arming the guerrilla group. After four decades of Cold War animosity, ties between Moscow and Israel improved significantly after the disintegration of the Soviet Union in 1991. Israel is also home to more than 1 million Soviet emigres.

But Moscow's position on Iran and arms sales to Syria have seemingly strained ties, as did Israeli weapons sales to Georgia. In reality, while Russia attacked Georgia in August 2008, Russians had access to the communication secrets of the Israeli drones sold to Georgia before, suggesting pre-planned military cooperation between IL-RU.

=== Contacts with Hezbollah ===
Russian intelligence agencies have a history of contacts with Lebanese Shia organizations, such as Amal Movement and Hezbollah Russian-made anti-tank weapons played significant role in Hezbollah operations against Israel Defense Forces during the 2006 Lebanon War. It was claimed that "Iranian Fajr-1 and Fajr-3 rockets, Russian 9M113 Konkurs antitank missiles and Kornet antitank rockets" have been supplied to Hezbollah through Syria and Iran Muslim GRU detachments from Chechnya were transferred to Lebanon independently of the United Nations Interim Force in Lebanon to guard the Russian military engineers (sent to Lebanon to restore the damaged roads) and "to improve Moscow's image in the Arab and Muslim world".

== List of international terror groups assembled by Russia ==
Russian list of international terrorism published in the official daily Rossiyskaya Gazeta on 28 July 2006 contained seventeen terror groups. It included al-Qaeda, Taliban, Lashkar-e-Tayyaba and Egypt's banned Muslim Brotherhood, as well as groups linked to separatist militants in Chechnya and Islamic radicals in Central Asia but omitted both Hamas and Hezbollah. Yury Sapunov, the top official of Russian Federal Security Service in charge of fighting international terrorism, said that the list "Includes only those organizations which represent the greatest threat to the security of our country."

== Russian military and diplomatic relations with Israel ==
Russian President Vladimir Putin met with leaders of both Israel and the Palestinian National Authority during a visit to the region in June 2012. During the visit, one prominent Israeli host was the country's foreign minister Avigdor Lieberman, known for his popularity amongst the large community of Russian-Israelis Arab commentators were also quick to point out how this visit, which carried with it indications of closer Russian-Israeli cooperation in energy and military technology, could usher in a break in a perceived, long-standing Arab-Russian alliance.

Russia recognized West Jerusalem as the capital of Israel in 2017. According to an Al Jazeera report, Moscow's approach to the Israel-Palestinian dispute is to support both opposing sides simultaneously.

== See also ==
- Iran–Russia relations
- Israel–Russia relations
