= Felix Sater =

Russian-American mobster (born 1966)

- Born: Felix Mikhailovich Sheferovsky or Haim Felix Sater; March 2, 1966 (age 60); Moscow, Russian SFSR, Soviet Union
- Other names: Felix Satter; Felix Slater; Felix Sader; Haim F Sater; Hai Ying Sater
- Education: Pace University
- Occupations: Real estate developer, FBI informant
- Years active: 1989–present
- Spouse: Viktoria Sater

Felix Henry Sater /ˈseɪtər/ (born Felix Mikhailovich Sheferovsky; Russian: Фе́ликс Миха́йлович Шеферовский; March 2, 1966) is a convicted felon, real estate developer and former managing director of Bayrock Group LLC, a real estate conglomerate based in New York City. He has been an advisor to corporations such as The Trump Organization, and the Mirax Group.

In 1998, Sater pleaded guilty to his involvement in a $40 million stock fraud scheme orchestrated by the Russian Mafia, and became an informant for the Federal Bureau of Investigation (FBI) and federal prosecutors, assisting with organized crime investigations. In 2017, Sater agreed to cooperate with investigators into international money laundering schemes.

During Donald Trump's 2016 presidential campaign, Sater worked with Michael Cohen, former attorney for The Trump Organization, to broker a deal to build a Trump Tower Moscow, asserting to Cohen that he could boost Trump's election prospects through his Russian contacts. On June 21, 2019, Sater was issued a subpoena by the House Intelligence Committee after he refused a request to testify voluntarily. On July 9, 2019, Sater appeared before the House Intelligence Committee, but repeatedly withheld testimony and documents concerning the details of a false joint defense agreement and thus remains under subpoena.

== Early life and family ==
Sater was born in Moscow into a Russian Jewish family, the son of Mikhail Sheferovsky and Rachel Sheferovskaya. He has a sister, Regina. The family emigrated to Israel when Felix was 8 years old to avoid religious persecution in the Soviet Union, and eventually came to the United States, living in Baltimore, Maryland before settling in Brighton Beach, New York in 1974. Felix and his sister adopted the surname Sater. Mikhail Sheferovsky (also known as Michael Sheferofsky) states that the family name was Saterov at some point (Сатаров). According to the FBI, Mikhail Sheferovsky was an underboss for Russian Mafia "boss of bosses" Semion Mogilevich, and was convicted of extorting money from local restaurants, grocery stores, and a medical clinic.

Felix Sater was reportedly a childhood friend of Michael Cohen.

== Business and advisory career ==
Sater attended Pace University, dropping out at the age of 18 to work on Wall Street, initially as a cold-caller at Bear Stearns. He subsequently worked at brokerages Ladenburg Thalmann, Broadchild Securities, Rooney Pace, Shearson, Moseley Securities, Gruntal & Co., and Lehman Brothers. In 1991, he smashed a margarita glass in a bar and used it to stab a commodities broker in the face, causing the man to need 110 stitches. For this, Sater was convicted of first-degree assault in 1993; spent 15 months in prison, and was barred by the National Association of Securities Dealers from acting as a broker or otherwise associating with a broker-dealer firm. In January 2022, Sater claimed that the barfight victim had tried to decline pressing charges, but that the U.S. government kept pressing because they wanted cooperation from Sater's father.

In 2008, Sater joined the board of the Russian real estate company Mirax Group, owned by Sergei Polonsky.

== Work with the Bayrock Group ==
Sater joined Bayrock Group LLC as a senior advisor in 2003 at the behest of the company's owner and founder, Tevfik Arif. As a senior advisor, he assisted with several projects, including executive decisions in the Trump SoHo project. He left Bayrock Group LLC in 2008 after the New York Times disclosed his pending criminal case.

=== Trump SoHo ===
Felix Sater was a managing director of Bayrock Group LLC, as well as a senior advisor to Donald Trump and The Trump Organization when construction of the Trump SoHo began in 2006.

He played a major role throughout the process of the building's construction, and remained managing director of Bayrock Group when the Trump SoHo project was completed in 2010. The building is a $450 million, 46-story, 391-unit hotel condominium located at 246 Spring Street in SoHo, New York City. The project was a collaboration between The Trump Organization, Bayrock Group LLC and Tamir Sapir.

In December 2017, the Trump SoHo was renamed to The Dominick.

== Other projects ==
Sater has been an advisor, investor, or developer in notable real estate projects including the Trump International Hotel & Residence in Phoenix, Arizona, the Conrad Fort Lauderdale and Midtown Miami in Florida, and Cornwall Terrace and 1 Blackfriars in London.

In addition to real estate development endeavors, Sater also has started businesses in the fields of investment, retail, and energy.

In late January 2017, Sater met with Ukrainian politician Andrey Artemenko and Donald Trump's personal lawyer, Michael Cohen, at the Loews Regency in Manhattan to discuss a plan to lift sanctions against Russia. The proposed plan would require that Russian forces withdraw from eastern Ukraine and that Ukraine hold a referendum on whether Crimea should be "leased" to Russia for 50 or 100 years. On 20 February 2017, Russian Foreign Minister Sergei Lavrov rejected Russia "leasing" Crimea from Ukraine claiming "we cannot rent from ourselves".

== Criminal convictions and federal cooperation ==
Felix Sater has been described as a career criminal due to his links to organized crime. In 1991, Sater got into an argument with a commodities broker at the El Rio Grande restaurant and bar in Midtown Manhattan. He stabbed the man's cheek and neck with the stem of a cocktail glass, breaking his jaw, lacerating his face, and severing nerves, creating a wound that would require 110 stitches to treat. Sater was convicted of first degree assault, and spent 15 months in minimum security Edgecombe Correctional Facility in New York City before being paroled. In 1998, Sater was convicted of fraud in connection to a $40 million penny stock pump and dump scheme conducted by the Russian Mafia involving his company White Rock Partners. In return for a guilty plea, Sater agreed to assist the FBI and federal prosecutors as an informant on organized crime. In 2009, he was sentenced to pay a $25,000 fine; he served no prison time and paid no restitution to his stock-fraud victims. As a result of his assistance, Sater's court records were sealed by Loretta Lynch, then the United States Attorney for the Eastern District of New York. Lynch's decision to seal his records, and the lack of any victim restitution, were discussed at her 2015 Congressional confirmation hearings to become attorney general; she stated that Sater provided "information crucial to national security and the conviction of over 20 individuals, including those responsible for committing massive financial fraud and members of Cosa Nostra. In 2006 there was a lawsuit that alleged that Sater made a death threat against a Bayrock investor named Ernie Menez. Sater threatened to have a man electrically shock Menez's genitals, cut off his legs, and have him put in the trunk of a car. Sater possibly did this because of Menez finding out about his past convictions and links to organized crime.

The Financial Times, citing five sources with knowledge of the matter, reported that Sater had agreed to cooperate with investigators looking into an international money laundering scheme involving Viktor Khrapunov, a former government minister in Kazakhstan. Khrapunov, who now lives in Switzerland, has been accused by the Kazakhstani government of embezzling millions of dollars and is wanted by Interpol.

Sater received multiple subpoenas to produce documents and be deposed in the case against Mukhtar Ablyazov who is alleged to have defrauded BTA Bank of up to $5 billion as chairman. Ablyazov's alleged fraud is one of the biggest cases of financial fraud in history.

In 2020, there was a civil lawsuit accusing Felix Sater and his partner Daniel Ridloff of using Trump properties such as Bayrock to launder millions of dollars in stolen funds. Sater denied the allegations and had attempted to settle the suit. In October 2025, Sater was found liable during a retrial and was ordered to pay $52 million in damages.

=== Role in the manhunt for Osama bin Laden ===
In December 2017, Sater was questioned by a congressional committee in an out-of-state interview about Russian interference in the 2016 United States elections. In his opening statement to that interview, Sater claimed to be a confidential source for the U.S. Government who played an important role in providing intelligence related to the Northern Alliance and Taliban, and locating and disrupting Al-Qaeda operations in Afghanistan as well as locating Osama bin Laden prior to the September 11 attacks. Sater further claimed that he had been in a position to kill bin Laden in 1998 during a raid on a terrorist training camp inside Afghanistan and regretted his decision not to, a claim that was later confirmed by investigative journalists Jason Leopold and Anthony Cormier via U.S. intelligence officials with knowledge of the incident. In 2019, as part of a broader discussion with the House Intelligence Committee about his years-long cooperation with the FBI, CIA, and Defense Intelligence Agency, Sater formally testified to assisting the U.S. Government locate Osama Bin Laden. Judge I. Leo Glasser confirmed that Sater helped the U.S. government track down bin Laden as he provided the telephone number of Osama bin Laden. Sater had been in a position to access information related to bin Laden's phone numbers and whereabouts due to having been involved with a telecommunications company with ties to the GRU in the mid-1990s that operated in former Soviet bloc countries and sold transmission data to AT&T.

== Involvement with Trump Organization during presidential campaign ==
The Trump Organization pursued a luxury hotel and condominium project in Moscow—dubbed the Trump Tower Moscow—during the Trump presidential campaign. This project was facilitated by Michael Cohen, then an attorney for the Trump Organization, and from January 2016 to May 2017 Trump's personal attorney. Trump signed a nonbinding "letter of intent" dated October 13, 2015, to proceed with the project. The letter, also signed by Russian investor Andrei Rozov, was forwarded to Cohen by Sater. He boasted to Cohen about his connections to Vladimir Putin, saying in an email to Cohen on November 13, 2015, "Buddy our boy can become president of the USA and we can engineer it. I will get all of Putins [sic] team to buy in on this. I will manage this process." He also asserted that he had secured financing for the project through the Russian state-owned VTB Bank, which was under sanctions by the United States government. BuzzFeed News reported on March 12, 2018, that Mueller's investigators had questioned Sater, and on April 13, 2018, reported that a former Russian spy had helped secure financing for the project. In 2010, Sater was provided business cards describing himself as "Senior Advisor to Donald Trump" with an email address at TrumpOrg.com. In a 2013 sworn affidavit, Trump said "If [Sater] were sitting in the room right now, I really wouldn't know what he looked like," and in 2015 he stated "Felix Sater, boy, I have to even think about it. I'm not that familiar with him." Trump has been photographed several times with Sater, including while speaking privately with him.

Sater's anticipated public testimony before the House Intelligence Committee, scheduled for March 27, 2019, was postponed pending the imminent release of the Mueller Report. He was then rescheduled to give closed-door testimony on June 21, 2019. On June 21, 2019, the U.S. House Intelligence Committee issued a subpoena to Sater after he skipped a testimony which he agreed to voluntarily. He later appeared before the House Intelligence Committee on July 9, 2019 during a closed door meeting which lasted for eight hours. Though Sater claimed that he cooperated and provided information about the Trump Tower project, Patrick Boland, spokesman for House Intelligence Committee Chairman Adam Schiff, denied this and stated that Sater only partially cooperated and showed defiance by withholding requested testimony and documents concerning a real estate project which Sater acknowledged was falsely presented as a joint defense agreement between Trump and Russia and the telephone conversations pertaining to this agreement. Boland also stated that Sater will remain under subpoena until he cooperates with this request.

== Personal life ==
His wife, Viktoria, is the founder and owner of a granola health food company. Felix Sater was a member of the Chabad of Port Washington and was named their Man of the Year in 2010 and 2014.

== See also ==
- Business projects of Donald Trump in Russia
- Links between Trump associates and Russian officials
- Mueller report
- Russian interference in the 2016 United States elections
