= Tevfik Arif =

Russian-Turkish real estate developer

- Born: Tofik Arifov; May 1953; Dzhambul, Dzhambul Oblast, Kazakh Soviet Socialist Republic, Soviet Union
- Citizenship: Turkish
- Occupation(s): Real estate developer, investor
- Known for: Bayrock Group
- Spouse: Gulnara Arifova

Tevfik Arif, also known as Tofik Arifov (Russian: Тофик Арифов; born May 1953), is a Russian/Turkish real estate developer and investor. He is the founder of the Bayrock Group, an international real estate development and investment company based in New York. He resides in the United States.

== Early life and career ==
Tevfik Arif was born Tofik Arifov in an ethnic Turkish family in Dshambul, Kazakh Soviet Socialist Republic. His family came to Kazakhstan from Meskhetia, Georgia after the ethnic Turkish Meskhetian community were deported by Joseph Stalin in 1944. Arif received an international relations degree from a Moscow university. Prior to the dissolution of the Soviet Union, Arif worked for the USSR's Ministry of Commerce and Trade for 17 years. He served as the deputy director of its Department of Hotel Management. Arif resigned from the ministry in 1991 and founded Speciality Chemicals Trading Company, an export-import business trading in rare metals, chrome, and raw materials which owned at Aktobe the Aktobe plant of chromium compounds from 1996 until 2016. He then worked as an "agent on the ground" in Kazakhstan for Trans World Group, a natural resources company run by David and Simon Reuben.

Arif moved to Turkey in 1993, where he started to expand his business interests far beyond the mining and metal industries he had started in Kazakhstan. He diversified into energy trading (Penta Energy Investments), car dealerships (import and distribution partnership with Turkish conglomerate Ihlas Holding) and hotels.

In 2002, a Novaya Gazeta article explained that Tevfik Arif is very close to Salim Abduvaliev and that both Arif and Abduvaliev are leaders of Uzbek mafia.

== Later career ==
=== Bayrock Group ===
In 2001, Arif founded the Bayrock Group, an international real estate and development company. He began developing property in Brooklyn, first redeveloping Loehmann's Seaport Plaza, a waterfront shopping center in Sheepshead Bay. Arif was originally the sole employee of Bayrock, later hiring Felix Sater as managing director.

After moving the Bayrock Group to Trump Tower, Arif developed a relationship with businessman Donald Trump. Trump provided a licensing deal for the Trump SoHo hotel in a joint venture between the Bayrock Group and the Sapir Organisation. In 2007, Bayrock traded future profits from Trump SoHo and other projects in exchange for $50 million in financing from Icelandic company FL Group.

Trump and Bayrock later developed the Trump International Hotel and Tower in Fort Lauderdale. The group were also involved in projects in Europe.

Although the working relationship with Trump ended in 2008, following the housing market collapse, Bayrock came under close scrutiny in the United States due to its dealings with Trump between 2002 and 2011. Nothing out of the ordinary was uncovered, and no official action has been taken against the company.

The Bayrock group received a lot of unfavorable press from two former employees, Felix Sater and Jody Kriss, however court cases that the two brought against the company have been settled out of court.

== Personal life ==
Arif is believed to live in Turkey and spends time in Switzerland and England. Today, Tevfik Arif is partially retired from the family's business. Other family members now lead the group, and Tevfik Arif provides the role of consultant and adviser to family members. Although he is not Jewish, he is one of the largest donors to the Chabad of Port Washington.
