= Artur Kirilenko =

Russian entrepreneur

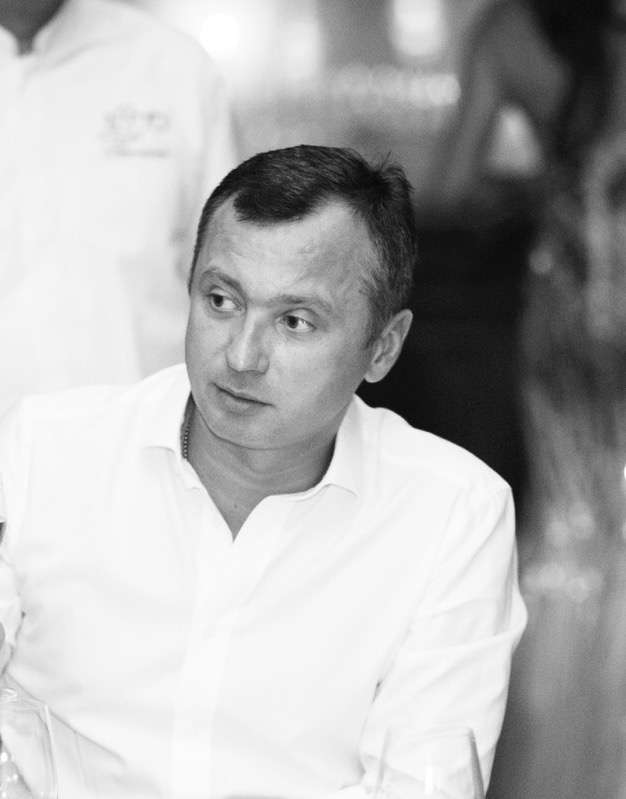
- Portrait of Artur Kirilenko
- Born: 22 June 1972 (age 54); Horlivka, Ukrainian SSR
- Education: Saint-Petersburg State University of Architecture and Civil Engineering
- Occupations: Entrepreneur, property developer, former owner of Stroymontazh

Artur Vladimirovich Kirilenko (Russian: Арту́р Влади́мирович Кириле́нко; born 22 June 1972), a Russian entrepreneur, between 1994 and 2010 was owner and director of Stroymontazh, one of the largest property development companies in St Petersburg, Russia. Honorary Builder of Russia.

In 2008, Finance magazine estimated his wealth at $1.1 billion, and included him in their list of 100 richest people in Russia (ranked 91) and named him as one of the ten richest businessmen in St. Petersburg.

Since 2010, Artur Kirilenko has been actively engaged in property management and financing of real estate development projects both in Russia and in Europe.

== Education ==
In 1991, Artur Kirilenko graduated from Industrial Technical School ("Gorlovsky Technical School of Donetsk National University") as mining foreman. For some time, he worked at Komsomolskaya coal mine.

In 2000, he graduated from the Department of Economics and Management in Construction Business at Saint-Petersburg State University of Architecture and Civil Engineering.

In 2002, he successfully defended his thesis "Competitiveness of a Construction Business" at Saint-Petersburg State University of Architecture and Civil Engineering to become a PhD in economics.

== Career ==
=== Early years ===
In 1991–1992 served in military.

In 1993 relocated to Saint Petersburg, Russia.

=== Stroymontazh ===
In 1994, Artur Kirilenko along with Sergei Polonsky founded construction company Stroymontazh in St. Petersburg and remained its owner and CEO between 1994 and 2010.

In 2000, Stroymontazh corporation opened a branch in Moscow, which had been headed by Sergei Polonsky. Artur Kirilenko remained a head of the St. Petersburg business of the group. In 2002, Polonsky and Kirilenko divided up the business and in 2004 Polonsky created Mirax Group on the basis of the Moscow branch end exited the St. Petersburg business of Stroymontazh: after dividing up the business Artur Kirilenko became a sole owner of Stroymontazh.

In 2004, Stroymontazh has delivered over 100,000 sq. meters of residential property and became the leader among the property developers in Saint Petersburg.

By 2008, Stroymontazh controlled about 10% of the construction market in St Petersburg in the residential sector. In 2008, the company delivered 286,000 square metres of residential property and its sales revenue exceeded 5.5 billion roubles (€150 million). Since inception the company built over 800,000 square metres of residential and 60,000 square metres of commercial property.

The company suffered considerable losses due to the 2008 financial crisis and a corporate conflict with one of its creditors Baltisky Bank, which was subsequently bailed out by Alfa-Bank. in 2010 Stroymontazh went into administration and in July 2015 the company was liquidated.

=== Hermitage ===
In 2003, Stroymontazh corporation established a French subsidiary named Stroimotage de Paris and subsequently renamed Hermitage. Emin Iskenderov has become the head of the French operations.

In 2006, Hermitage began construction of its first project Les Allees de l’Hermitage, which was successfully completed in 2008 and was named the best residential development in Ile-de-France.

This was followed by such projects as:

Avant-Seine for 300 apartments, completed in 2009;

Domaine du Lac for 1000 apartments, completed in 2009;

Le Jardin des Muses for 200 apartments, completed in 2012.

In 2007, Hermitage started working on the project of mixed-use towers Hermitage Plaza.

For this project, Hermitage partnered with the British architect Sir Norman Foster, French conglomerate Bouygues, as well as Khight Frank, KPMG, Cushman&Wakefield and others. The development project will see the construction of two skyscrapers of 86 stories and 320 meters tall, which by 2024 will become the tallest building in Western Europe.

== Disputes and litigation ==
At the height of the Great Recession in 2008, as the construction sector experienced severe liquidity shortage, Baltisky Bank, one of Stroymontazh's creditors, initiated a series of court suits aimed at acquiring the debtor's assets at distressed value. Artur Kirilenko acted as a guarantor for the loans and Baltisky Bank also sued him personally for 1.2 billion rubles (€33 million). Apart from this, Baltisky Bank also initiated a criminal investigation, which was eventually dropped as the inquiry found no instances of criminal conduct or wrongdoing in Kirilenko’s actions. No signs of premeditated bankruptcy were found in the actions by Stroymontazh's management. Transactions involving Stroymontazh's assets were pronounced fair and justified and all proceeds were used for completion of the project construction.

In 2009, Stroimontage filed for bankruptcy, describing it as a “necessary measure”, in order to defend the interests of private investors - primarily buyers of the off-plan apartments - against the hostile actions of Baltisky Bank. In 2010, the court declared ZAO "Stroymontazh" insolvent and it went into bankruptcy administration; Artur Kirilenko resigned as the CEO of the company. By that time, Stroymontazh has completed all of its construction projects and fulfilled all its obligations towards off-plan buyers and restructured its liabilities towards all other banks, including Bank Saint-Petersburg, Sberbank, Alfa-Bank, Baltinvestbank, Rosbank, Credit Europe Bank and others.

In February 2015, the Petrograd district court of St. Petersburg validated the settlement agreement between the subsidiaries of Baltisky Bank and Artur Kirilenko as guarantor of Stroymontazh. Later, Baltisky Bank experienced a shareholder conflict, which resulted in it being bailed out by Alfa-Bank and criminal charges being pressed upon its former shareholder and chairman Oleg Shigaev, the initiator of Stroymontazh’s bankruptcy. Oleg Shigaev was subsequently put on a wanted list and charged with fraud and money laundering.

== Awards ==
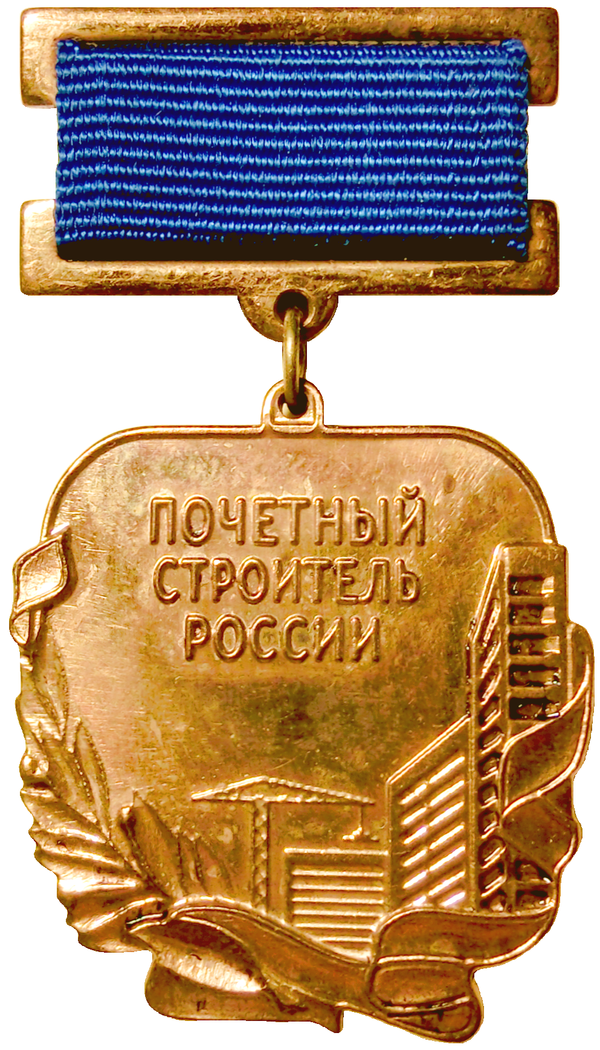

Honorary Builder of Russia.

Was ranked amount the best top-managers of Russia, prize winner Construction Olympus 2003 as the Leader of the Year.

Received awards Construction Glory, Best Enterpriser, Best Manager of Russia, Silver Cross of St George Union, prize of Peter the Great and golden medal for Efficient Business Management and Achieving Stable Social and Economic Results. Received honorary prize by Ministry of Construction of Russia for Contribution into Preparation and Celebration of 300 Anniversary of St. Petersburg.

Artur Kirilenko was awarded a Reverend Anderi Rublev medal first class by the Russian Orthodox Church for "attention and aid to St. Petersburg eparchy" and as recognition of Stroymontazh’s participation in construction of the church of St. George the Victorious in Kupchino.

== Family life ==
Married, has a son (31) and three daughters (5, 15 and 17). Loves sport and travel.
