= Turks in Kazakhstan =

Ethnic Turks living in Kazakhstan

Total population
- 91,732 (2025 government est.)

Regions with significant populations
- Almaty; South Kazakhstan; Zhambil; Qyzylorda

Languages
- Turkish, Kazakh, Russian

Religion
- Predominantly Sunni Islam

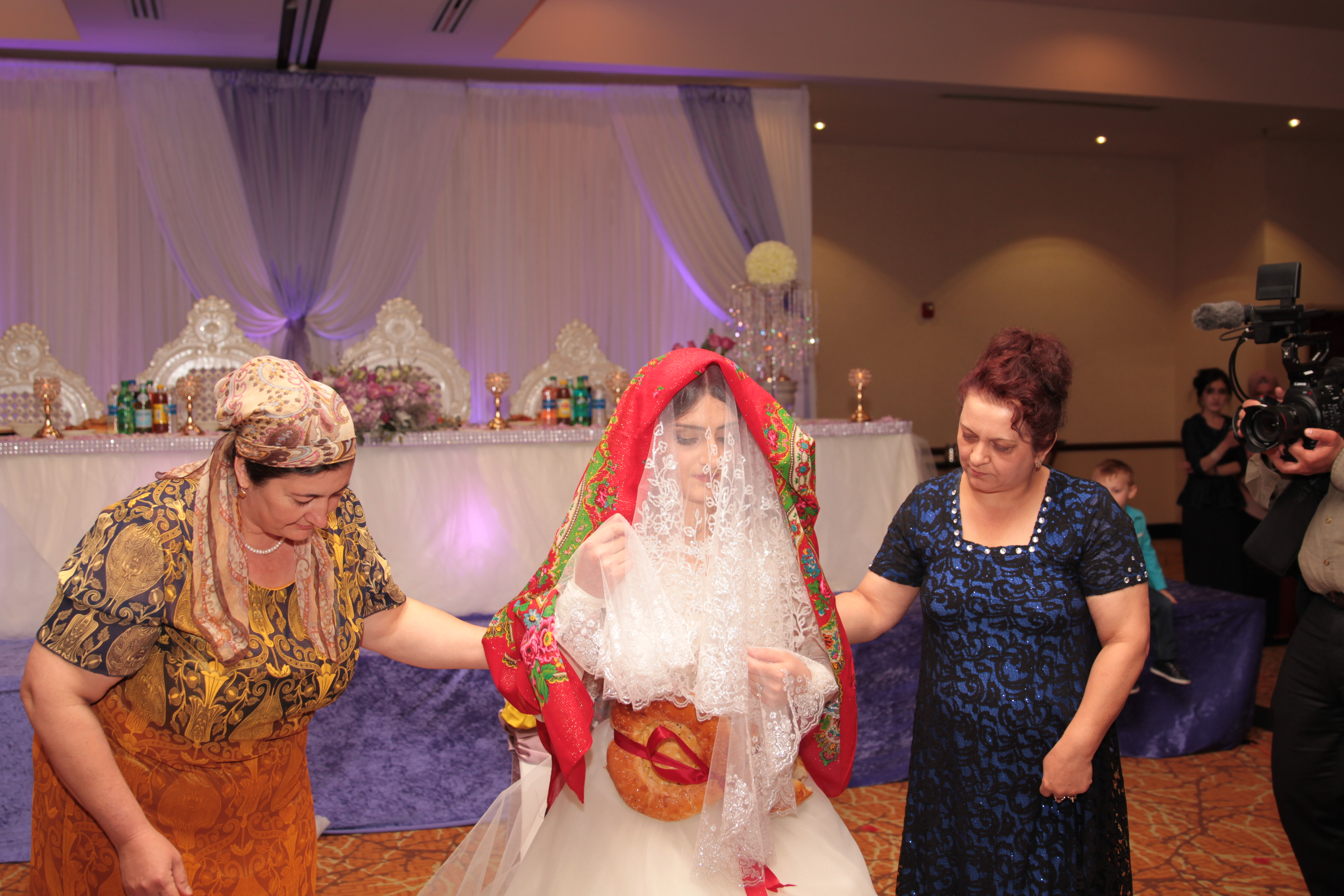
Meskhetian Turk bride

Turks in Kazakhstan (Turkish: Kazakistan'daki Türkler; Kazakh: Qazaqstandağy türıkter) are ethnic Turks who live in Kazakhstan, mostly from Meskheti after the Deportation of the Meskhetian Turks.

== History ==
=== Ottoman migration ===
The First All-Union Census of the Soviet Union in 1926 recorded 8,570 Ottoman Turks living in the Soviet Union. The Ottoman Turks are no longer listed separately in the census, it is presumed that those who were living in Kazakhstan have either been assimilated into Kazakh society or have left the country.

=== Meskhetian Turks migration ===
Turks in Kazakhstan according to official censuses
Census	Turks	% of Kazakh population
1939	523	0%
1959	9,916	0.1%
1970	18,397	0.1%
1979	25,820	0.2%
1989	49,567	0.3%
1999	75,950	0.5%
2009	97,015	0.6%
2021	85,478	0.4%

During World War II, the Soviet Union was preparing to launch a pressure campaign against Turkey. Vyacheslav Molotov, then Minister of Foreign Affairs, demanded to the Turkish Ambassador in Moscow for the surrender of three Anatolian provinces (Kars, Ardahan and Artvin).

Thus, war against Turkey seemed possible, and Joseph Stalin wanted to clear the strategic Turkish population situated in Meskheti, near the Turkish-Georgian border. Nationalistic policies at the time encouraged the slogan: "Georgia for Georgians" and that the Meskhetian Turks should be sent to Turkey "where they belong".

By 1944, the Meskhetian Turks were forcefully deported from Meskheti and accused of smuggling, banditry and espionage in collaboration with their kin across the Turkish border. Thus, large settlements of Meskhetian Turks were formed in Kazakhstan and they were not permitted by the Georgian government of Zviad Gamsakhurdia to return to their homeland.

In the last Soviet Census, conducted in 1989, there were 207,500 Meskhetian Turks in the Soviet Union and over 23.8% were registered in Kazakhstan.

== Demographics ==
Although the last Soviet census recorded a low figure of 207,269 Turks, this may have not counted all ethnic Turks, because for many years, Turks were denied the right to register their nationality in legal documents. Thus, in Kazakhstan, only a third of them were recorded as Turks on their passports. The rest had been arbitrarily declared members of other ethnic groups.

According to academics there are 150,000 Turks who reside in Kazakhstan. 45,000 in Almaty, 40,000 in South Kazakhstan, 36,000 in Zhambil and 10,000 in Qyzylorda.

== Education ==
Due to historical links between Turkish and Kazakh people, the Turks living in Kazakhstan are well provided. The Hoca Ahmet Yesevi International Kazakh-Turkish University was established in Turkistan of Kazakhstan in 1993 and has around 20,000 students. It is one of the leading universities in the country. One of the country's best universities, Suleyman Demirel University, was named after the former Prime Minister and President of Turkey. There is also 28 Kazakh-Turkish high schools, one university and one primary school which are operated by private Turkish foundations. There is also one Turkish Language Teaching Center in Almaty.

== Notable people ==
- Tevfik Arif, businessman; founder of the Bayrock Group (Turkish Meskhetian origin)
- Mukhtar Mukhtarov, football player
- Fatih Osmanlı, actor in the Turkish historical drama Kuruluş: Osman (Turkish Meskhetian origin)
- Ravil Tagir, football player (Turkish Meskhetian origin)

== See also ==
- Kazakhstan–Turkey relations
- Turkic Council
- Turks in the former Soviet Union

== Bibliography ==
- Akiner, Shirin (1983), Islamic Peoples of the Soviet Union, Taylor & Francis, ISBN 0-7103-0025-5.
- Atabaki, Touraj; Mehendale, Sanjyot (2005), Central Asia and the Caucasus: transnationalism and diaspora, Routledge, ISBN 0-415-33260-5.
- Aydıngün, Ayşegül (2002), "Ahiska (Meskhetian) Turks: Source of Conflict in the Caucasus?", The International Journal of Human Rights, 6 (2): 49–64, doi:10.1080/714003762
- Aydıngün, Ayşegül; Harding, Çigğdem Balım; Hoover, Matthew; Kuznetsov, Igor; Swerdlow, Steve (2006), Meskhetian Turks: An Introduction to their History, Culture, and Resettelment Experiences (PDF), Center for Applied Linguistics, archived from the original (PDF) on 2007-07-14.
- Babak, Vladimir; Vaisman, Demian; Wasserman, Aryeh (2004), Political Organization in Central Asia and Azerbaijan: Sources and Documents, Routledge, ISBN 0-7146-4838-8.
- Bennigsen, Alexandre; Broxup, Marie (1983), The Islamic threat to the Soviet state, Taylor & Francis, ISBN 0-7099-0619-6.
- Blacklock, Denika (2005), Finding Durable Solutions for the Meskhetians (PDF), European Centre for Minority Issues, archived from the original (PDF) on 2010-06-02.
- Cornell, Svante E. (2001), Small Nations and Great Powers: A Study of Ethnopolitical Conflict in the Caucasus, Routledge, ISBN 0-7007-1162-7.
- Council of Europe (2006), Documents: working papers, 2005 ordinary session (second part), 25–29 April 2005, Vol. 3: Documents 10407, 10449-10533, Council of Europe, ISBN 92-871-5754-5.
- Council of Europe (2007), Parliamentary Assembly: Working Papers 2007 Ordinary Session 22–26 January 2007, Council of Europe, ISBN 978-92-871-6191-8.
- Khazanov, Anatoly Michailovich (1995), After the USSR: Ethnicity, Nationalism and Politics in the Commonwealth of Independent States, University of Wisconsin Press, ISBN 0-299-14894-7.
- Kurbanov, Rafik Osman-Ogly; Kurbanov, Erjan Rafik-Ogly (1995), "Religion and Politics in the Caucasus", in Bourdeaux, Michael (ed.), The Politics of Religion in Russia and the New States of Eurasia, M.E. Sharpe, ISBN 1-56324-357-1.
- Minahan, James (1998), Miniature Empires: A Historical Dictionary of the Newly Independent States, Greenwood Publishing Group, ISBN 0-313-30610-9.
- Tomlinson, Kathryn (2005), "Living Yesterday in Today and Tomorrow: Meskhetian Turks in Southern Russia", in Crossley, James G.; Karner, Christian (eds.), Writing History, Constructing Religion, Ashgate Publishing, ISBN 0-7546-5183-5.
