= Bayrock Group =

US real estate company connected to Trump

Bayrock Group, LLC
- Type: Private
- Industry: Real estate development
- Founded: 2001
- Founder: Tevfik Arif
- Headquarters: 160 Varick Street No. 2, New York City, U.S.
- Key people: Tevfik Arif (Chairman)
- Products: Commercial property; Luxury apartments; Mixed-use development
- Subsidiaries: Bayrock Merrimac, LLC; Bayrock Ocean Club, LLC; Bayrock Spring Street, LLC; Bayrock Whitestone, LLC
- Website: bayrockgroup.com (archived)

Bayrock Group, LLC is a private real estate investment and development firm specializing in luxury residential, commercial and mixed use projects. Through its affiliated entities, Bayrock has made investments in transactions comprising real estate assets valued in excess of $2.5 billion. Bayrock's flexible investment strategy allows it to pursue investments in a variety of sectors and markets.

== Corporate structure ==
The Bayrock Group was founded in 2001 by Tevfik Arif, a former Soviet official from Kazakhstan. According to Forbes, Bayrock is "a series of commonly controlled, but not wholly owned, limited liability companies." Bayrock Group is arranged in tiers, with Bayrock Group LLC having a majority or plurality interest in around 12 subsidiary holding companies. The holding companies in turn have majority interests in companies on lower tiers. The lower tier subsidiaries correspond to individual real estate projects, with Bayrock Spring Street corresponding to Trump SoHo, Bayrock Camelback to the Phoenix hotel project, and Bayrock Merrimac to the Trump Fort Lauderdale hotel. Other Bayrock subsidiaries include Bayrock Whitestone and Bayrock Ocean Club.

Bayrock Group has had strategic partnerships with international entities outside of the United States including Icelandic investment company FL Group.

== Projects and properties ==
=== Loehmann's Seaport Plaza ===
Bayrock began developing property in Brooklyn, initially redeveloping Loehmann's Seaport Plaza, a three-story, 280,000-square-foot (26,000 m^{2}) waterfront shopping center on Emmons Avenue in Sheepshead Bay, Brooklyn. The property's tenants include Loehmann's and Nine West Shoes.

=== Trump International Hotel & Residence ===
In 2003, Bayrock purchased a site out of bankruptcy in the Camelback Corridor of Phoenix, Arizona. Bayrock announced plans for the Trump International Hotel & Residence, a $200 million, 190-foot Trump International Hotel. Plans for the project included 97 private residential units starting at $950,000 and 188 hotel/condo rooms. While the site was approved by the Phoenix City Council and the Planning Commission in 2005, the project was curbed by public opposition and never finished.

=== Moscow high-rise ===
In 2005, Donald Trump entered into an agreement with the Bayrock Group for a one-year deal to develop a project in Moscow. Bayrock located Russian investors and a potential site for the high-rise, a closed pencil factory named for Sacco and Vanzetti. "We looked at some very, very large properties in Russia," on the scale of "...a large Vegas high-rise." Bayrock proposed a potential deal in Moscow between Trump International Hotel and Russian investors in 2007, but the deal never came to fruition.

=== Trump SoHo ===
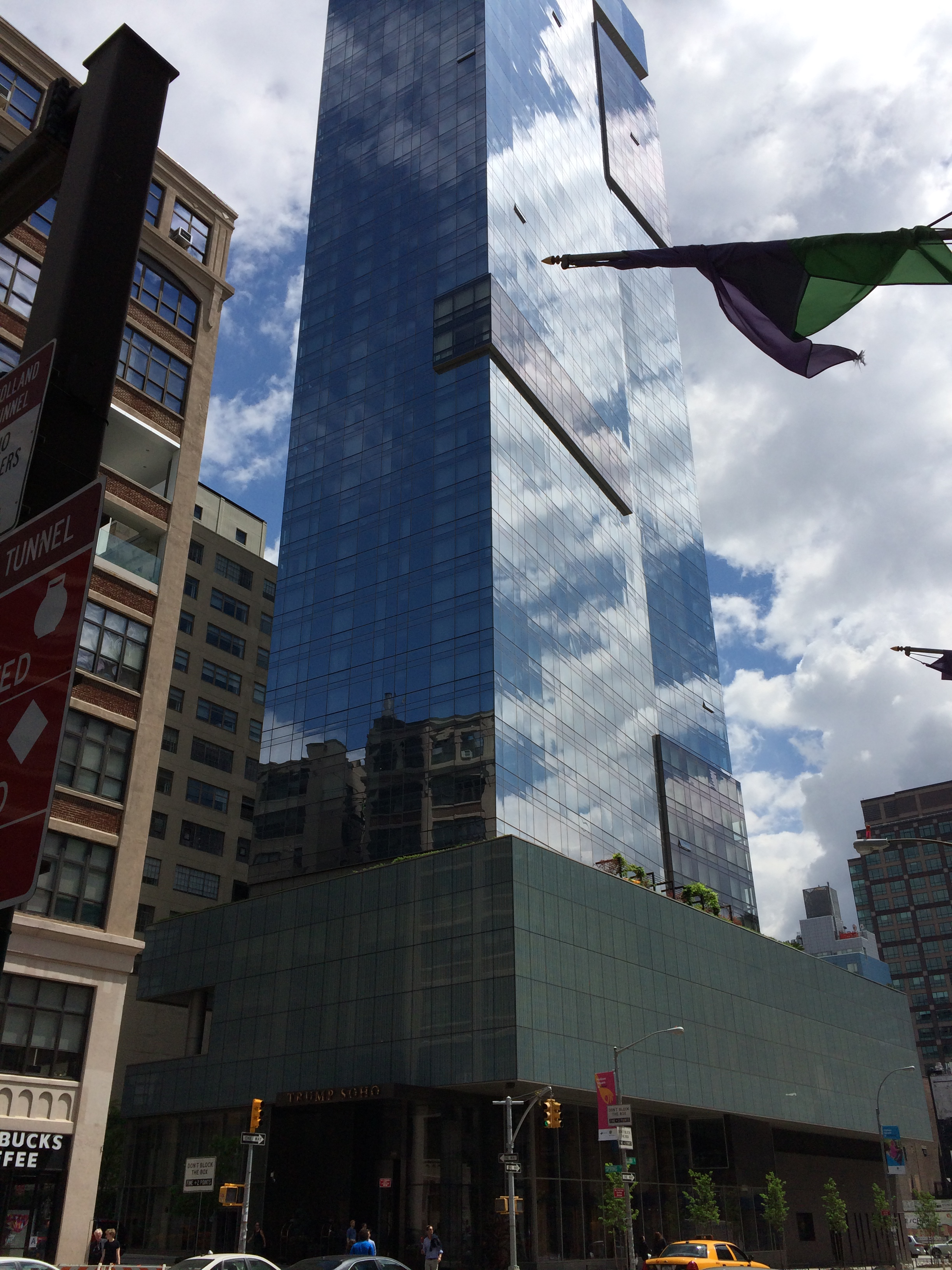
Trump SoHo, 2014

The Trump SoHo is a $450 million, 46-story, 39-unit, condo-hotel hybrid located at 246 Spring Street in SoHo, New York City. The hotel was a joint venture between Bayrock, The Trump Organization, and the Sapir Organization, a company owned by Georgian real estate developer Tamir Sapir. Trump provided a licensing deal for the hotel in exchange for an 18% equity stake in the project.

In 2007, Bayrock traded future profits from Trump SoHo and other projects in exchange for $50 million in financing from Icelandic company FL Group.

=== Trump International Hotel and Tower (Fort Lauderdale) ===
Bayrock entered into a joint venture with Trump to develop the Trump International Hotel and Tower in Fort Lauderdale, Florida.

The working relationship with Donald Trump ended in 2008, following the housing market collapse.

== Controversies ==
Trump International Hotel & Residence investor Ernest Mennes filed a lawsuit in U.S. District Court in Arizona in 2007. The suit alleged that Bayrock had skimmed money from its planned Trump development in Phoenix. It further alleged that Felix Sater, an employee of Bayrock, had called Mennes in 2006, threatening him personally. The case was settled by Bayrock and Mennes was barred from discussing the matter.

In the federal case Kriss et al. vs. Bayrock Group LLC et al., two former Bayrock employees, former director of finance Jody Kriss and Michael Chudi Ejekam, filed a suit in the U.S. District Court in New York in 2010. The suit alleged that Sater's role in the company was hidden and that the company was "substantially and covertly mob-owned and operated." The case was settled out of court at the insistence of plaintiffs, with no admission of guilt from either party.

In 2011, the Rockwell Group, an interior design firm, sued Bayrock and Sapir Organization for over $1.5 million in damages after Bayrock failed to pay for interior design work at Trump SoHo. Bayrock countersued two days later, filing a complaint with the New York Supreme Court, the case was eventually dropped.

Attorneys Frederick Oberlander and Richard Lerner brought a qui tam case against Bayrock in 2015. The suit alleged that Arif, Satter, and others had been in control of Bayrock for nearly a decade and had "engaged in a series of tax frauds and then took steps to hide the fraud"; this case was thrown out by a New York Judge.

Felix Sater, an American entrepreneurial financier and real estate developer, was employed as managing director of Bayrock Group from 2003 to 2008. Unfortunately for Bayrock, during a 2008 investigation into Sater, a worrying and chequered past emerged that led to his suspension and dismissal. Amongst other things in 1991 he got into an argument with a commodities broker at the El Rio Grande restaurant and bar in Midtown Manhattan. Sater stabbed the broker's cheek and neck with a cocktail glass, breaking his jaw and severing nerves. Sater was convicted of first degree assault and spent 15 months in minimum security Edgecombe Correctional Facility in New York City, before being paroled. Additionally, in 1998, Sater pleaded guilty to his involvement in a $40 million stock fraud scheme orchestrated by the Russian-Jewish Mafia, and became an informant for the FBI, assisting with organized crime investigations.
