= The Dominick =

Residential skyscraper in Manhattan, New York

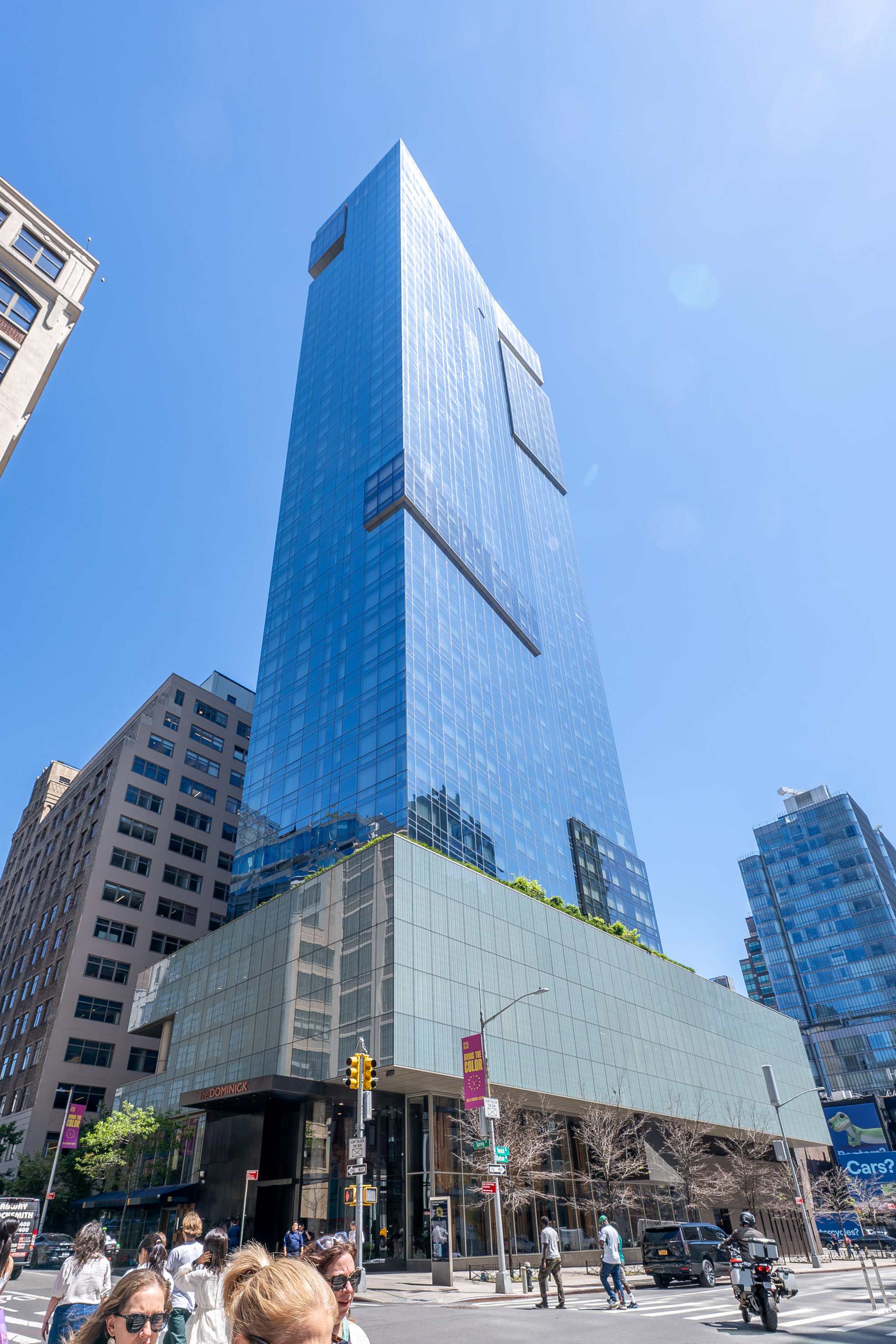
- The Dominick in 2026
- Former names: Trump SoHo

General information
- Status: Completed
- Type: Hotel-condominium
- Location: 246 Spring Street, Manhattan, New York City
- Coordinates: 40.7255°N 74.0054°W
- Construction started: 2006
- Completed: 2008
- Cost: $450 million

Height
- Roof: 454 ft (138 m)

Technical details
- Floor count: 46

Design and construction
- Architects: Handel Architects, Rockwell Group
- Developer: Trump Organization, Bayrock Group LLC, The Sapir Organization, FL Group
- Structural engineer: DeSimone Consulting Engineers
- Main contractor: Bovis Lend Lease

Website
- thedominickhotel.com

The Dominick, formerly the Trump SoHo, is a $450 million, 46-story, 391-unit hotel condominium located at 246 Spring Street at the corner of Varick Street in the Hudson Square neighborhood of Manhattan, New York City. It was announced in 2006, completed in 2008 and renamed in 2017.

The area is zoned for manufacturing, which precludes permanent residences from being built there. The condo-hotel design was approved after negotiations with New York City Mayor Michael Bloomberg. As a hotel condominium, 391 dwelling units within the building will be privately owned, but no unit may "be occupied by the same person for more than 29 days in any 36-day period, or for more than 120 days a year". When not occupied by the owner, an empty unit may be rented out as a hotel suite. The design architects for the building were the New York–based Handel Architects. The interior designer is David Rockwell of the Rockwell Group.

The project was a collaboration between Donald Trump's The Trump Organization, the Bayrock Group and Tamir Sapir. Trump has not invested his own capital in the project. Before the Trump name was removed, the Trump SoHo was the most recent building project constructed by Trump with his name on it, as of August 2016.

The hotel is part of Preferred Hotels & Resorts' Legend Collection.

== Amenities ==
The developers stated that the 386,000-square-foot (3.59 ha) condo-hotel was designed to contribute to the neighborhood as well as the skyline. On the other hand, many complain that it "sticks out like a sore thumb" and is entirely inappropriate for the area. Along with the private rooms, there are public areas, including Spring & Varick restaurant and Mr. Jones, the hotel's cocktail lounge.

The external walls of each room are made completely of double sided mirrors, giving its tenants a panoramic view. The rooms are the only New York City hotel furnished by Fendi Casa. The 46th floor is home to "SoHi", an event space offering New York skyline views.

== History ==
The plans for the building were unveiled on Donald Trump's show, The Apprentice, and chosen by the Season 5 winner, Sean Yazbeck, over the Honolulu Trump International Hotel and Tower project on the June 5, 2006, Apprentice season finale. As of August 2016, it was the newest building constructed by Trump with his name on it, but by November 2017, this was no longer set to be the case due to the removal of the Trump name.

Partners on the project included Soviet-born businessmen Felix Sater and Tevfik Arif, who ran the Bayrock Group real estate development firm. Trump's deal with Sater and Arif gave Trump 18 percent of the equity in the project in exchange for licensing Trump's name.

=== Construction and difficulties ===
Excavation and foundation work for the new building began in November 2006, though full city approval for the project was not granted until May 2007. The plan faced strong opposition from the Greenwich Village Society for Historic Preservation. The preservation group felt that the building was too large and not in keeping with the community's character. They pushed for rezonings of the Far West Village and Hudson Square that would prevent out-of-scale projects such as this.

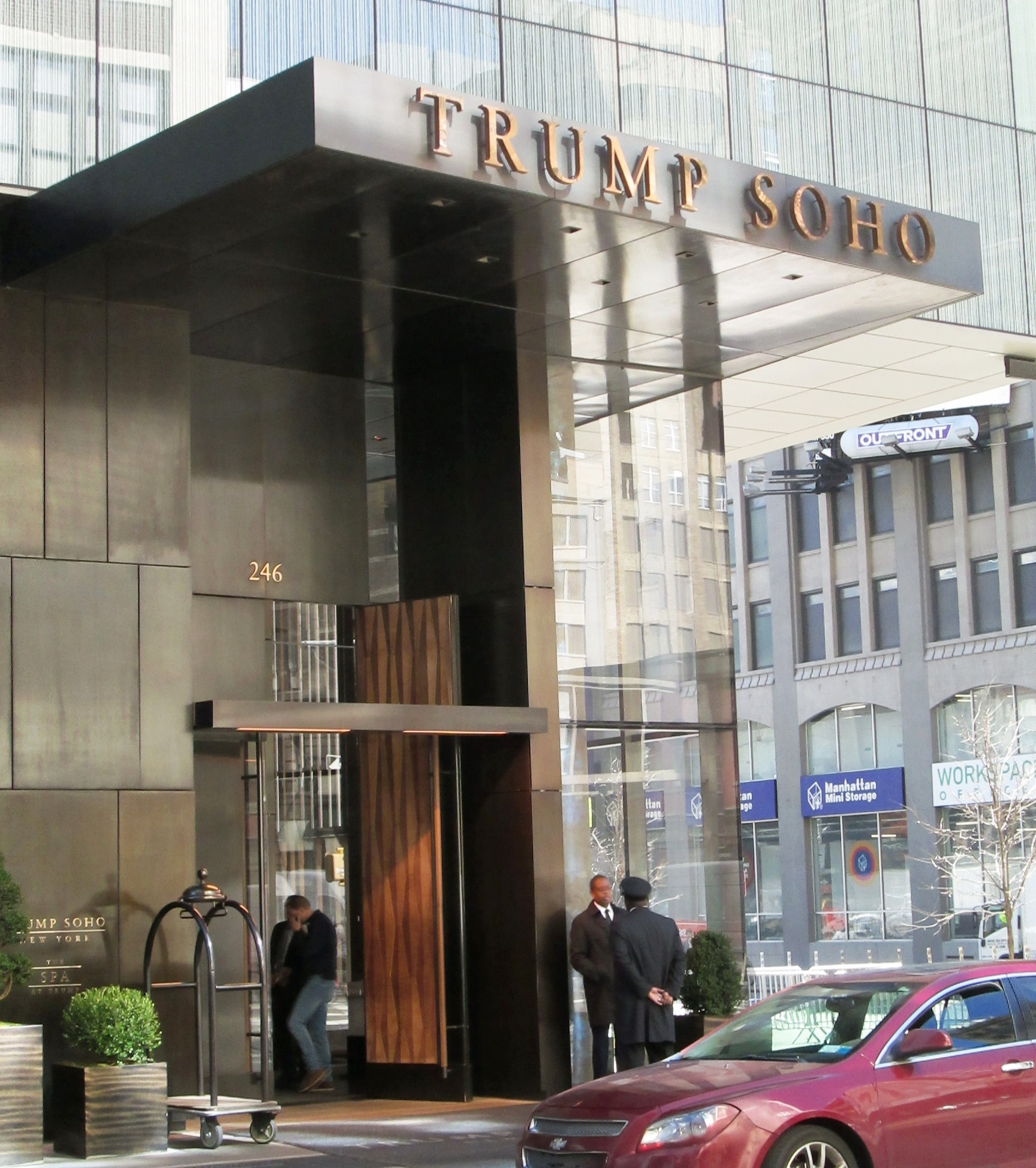
The building's entrance on Spring Street

Construction was temporarily halted in December 2006 after workers discovered human bones. Archaeologists determined that the remains were from 19th-century burial vaults built under the former Spring Street Presbyterian Church, which stood at the site until 1966.

On January 14, 2008, formwork collapsed during a concrete pour, killing one worker. Yuriy Vanchytskyy, an immigrant from Ukraine employed by DiFama Concrete, fell from the 42nd floor and was decapitated; three other workers were injured. The Department of Buildings halted work on the project and the contractor, Bovis Lend Lease, was issued four violations. Investigators subsequently determined that the wooden formwork did not meet industry standards. The stop-work order, which only applied to the building's upper floors, was later lifted on August 22.

The building's financing was troubled: Bank of America dumped the mezzanine loan for far less than its $75 million face value and the lenders who have $350 million in loans had to restructure debt with the developer.

=== Fraud lawsuit ===
On November 2, 2011, Adam Leitman Bailey, represented a group of buyers who were in contract with approximately 30 apartments in Trump Soho, including French soccer player Olivier Dacourt, suing the condominium for fraud. The plaintiffs had claimed that they were tricked into buying the condos by "deceptive" sales figures from the developers and that the number of apartments sold at Trump Soho had been "fraudulently misrepresented". While the lawsuit continued, The Wall Street Journal reported that the owners of Trump SoHo were offering buyers partial refunds on their deposits if they agreed not to participate in the lawsuit.

In 2015, the case settled with the owners obtaining 90 percent of their down payments as well as their attorney fees. The New York Post described plaintiffs' 90% recovery as "staggering.” In addition, the plaintiffs agreed unless subpoenaed not to cooperate with prosecutors who were investigating Trump family members. Further, the attorney for the buyer, Adam Leitman Bailey—who had been assisting prosecutors—agreed as part of the settlement to "write a letter to the [Manhattan District Attorney Cyrus Vance Jr.] that stated, 'We acknowledge that the Defendants have not violated the criminal laws of the State of New York or the United States.'"

In 2017, the Trump SoHo lawsuit was described as "a watershed case in the world of condo litigation. ... [C]ondo attorneys said that developers are now far more reluctant to disclose sales information to buyers' attorneys, for fear of legal repercussions if they turn out to be wrong".

=== Decline in business and disassociation with Trump ===
Because of Trump's campaign in the 2016 presidential election, Trump branded properties in New York City saw a decline in business. In May 2017, WNYC reported that business at the Trump SoHo had fallen off, and that the hotel had plans to lay off some staff. The report speculated that the Trump name may be the cause of the downturn, although it pointed out that other Trump properties, such as the Trump International Hotel in Washington, D.C. and the resort-hotel in Mar-a-Lago, had not experienced business reverses, and were in fact doing very well. Other Trump properties, such as Trump National Golf Club in Los Angeles and Trump Ferry Point in the Bronx, had shown a marked decrease in business. In November 2017, the Trump Organization reported that it was no longer going to be affiliated with the Trump SoHo by the end of the year. The building was renamed the Dominick on December 21, 2017.

In July 2025, Cain agreed to pay about $175 million for the Dominick.

== Critical reception ==
The AIA Guide to New York City, 5th edition, calls the building a "banal glass box".
