= Kazakhstan–Turkey relations =

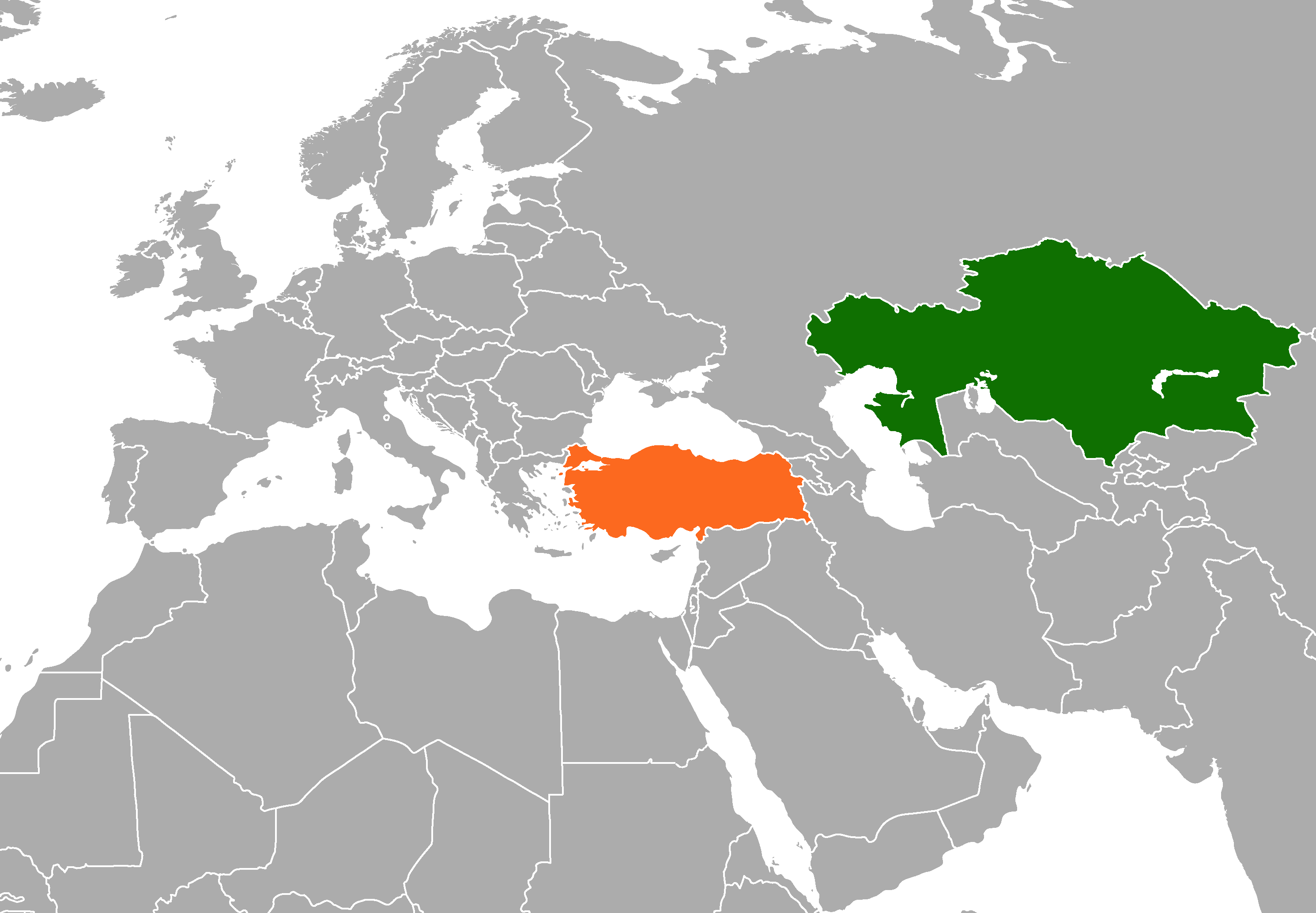

- Kazakhstan: Turkey

Diplomatic mission
- Embassy of Kazakhstan, Ankara: Embassy of Turkey, Astana

Kazakhstan–Turkey relations are foreign relations between Kazakhstan and Turkey. Turkey recognized Kazakhstan on 16 December 1991, being the first state to recognize the independence of Kazakhstan, when Kazakhstan declared its independence. Diplomatic relations between the two countries were established on 2 March 1992. These relations have developed positively on the international stage as well as in commerce and strategic affairs. Kazakhstan has an embassy in Ankara and a consulate general in Istanbul. Turkey has an embassy in Astana and a branch office in Almaty. Kazakhstan is a member of the Eurasian Economic Union and the CSTO, whereas Turkey is an EU candidate and a NATO member.

As two large nations in Eurasia and sharing the extensive cultural, historical and linguistic heritage of Turkic peoples, both nations have sought to develop closer relations and promote Turkic identity and friendship amongst other Turkic nations in the region. Both Kazakhstan and Turkey are founding members of Organization of Turkic States. The concept of a common Turkic political entity was proposed by Nursultan Nazarbayev, the first president of Kazakhstan.

== History ==
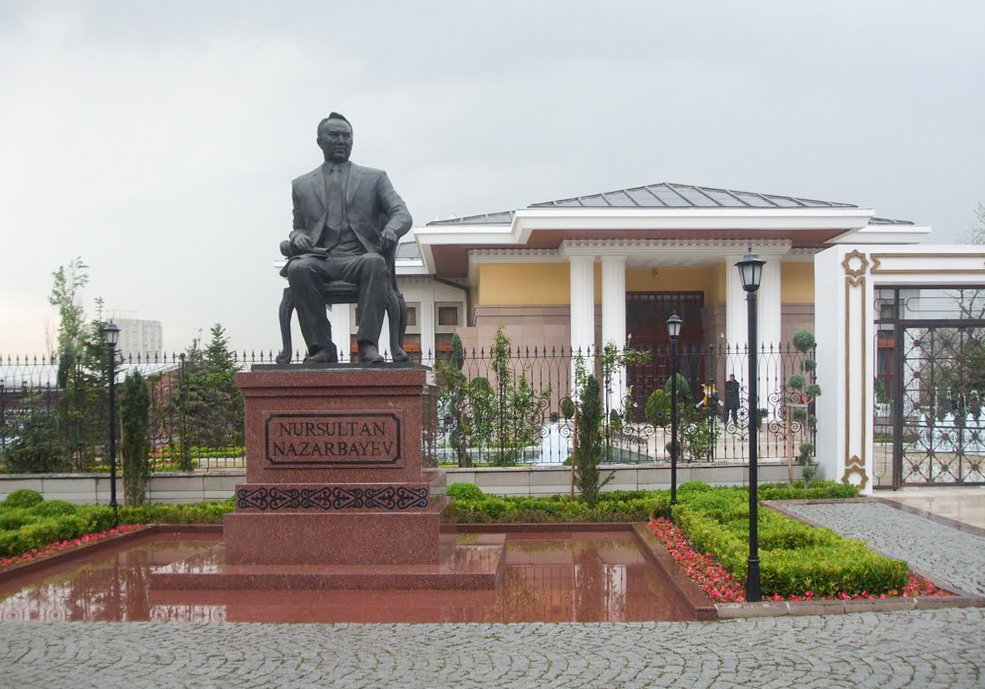
Monument to Nursultan Nazarbayev in Ankara

=== Kipchak–Oghuz relations ===
Relations between two nations have deep roots, due to their shared heritage within the Western Turkic Khaganate, the ancestral state of both the Kipchak and Oghuz tribes that went separate way, and with different histories. However, it was the Mongol invasion of the Khwarazmian Empire, a Persianate Oghuz empire, that permanently split the two Turkic peoples into two distinct groups. The Oghuz, having never accepted Mongol domination to a point of near total decimation, fled west; while the Kipchaks fell to Mongol rule as Golden Horde, and underwent an extensive Mongolisation of culture, even though it was Turkified later on linguistically.

The Kipchak people were later dispersed after the brutal war between them and the Karluk-led Timurid Empire of Timur, and some Kipchak groups found sanctuary in the nascent Oghuz-led Ottoman Sultanate as the Black Tatars by Bayezid I. However, the Kipchaks infamously betrayed the Ottomans during the Battle of Ankara in 1402 and joined the Gurkanis, resulted in Bayezid's capture by Timur. After that, the Ottoman Empire's relations with Kipchak groups were largely peripheral at best, dependant on various Kipchak states like Crimean Khanate, Nogai Horde or Kazan Khanate, mostly served as vassals only for the Ottomans. Ottoman Empire also developed relations with the Lipka Tatars, but it was tense as the Lipka Tatars, despite their Kipchak root, pledged allegiance to the Polish–Lithuanian Commonwealth and even played a pivotal role in the Ottoman defeat in Vienna 1683; though there was a temporary alliance between the two after the Lipka rebellion.

=== Kazakh–Ottoman relations ===
The first official diplomatic relations beginning between the Kazakh Khanate and the Ottoman Empire in the 16th century when Burunduk Khan did meet Ottoman officials in Baghdad. The relations got an attempted revival at the early 18th century when the Ottomans exchanged messages with Kaip Khan during the 1710s, when the Khan expressed interests in reviving relations with the Ottomans out of fear of Russian and Dzungar threats. However, geographical circumstances meant such alliance never fostered; the Ottomans were interested in preserving their Oghuz realm, while the Kazakhs faced immense pressures by Russia and Dzungar; later on, Qing China, having exterminated the Dzungars, waged a repeated series of wars to take over more Kazakh land, weakened the Kazakh Khanate and paved way for the Russian conquest.

Relations between them only emerged back in the 20th century, albeit distantly, when Enver Pasha travelled to Central Asia at the request of the Soviet to crush the Basmachi movement, only to defect to the Basmachi before being killed. After that, the relations of Kazakhstan and Turkey were directed mainly throughout the relations of Turkey and the Soviet Union.

=== Kazakh–Turkish relations ===
In March 1991, the official visit of the President of Turkey Turgut Özal took place at the invitation of Kazakhstan's then-President of the Kazakh Soviet Socialist Republic Nursultan Nazarbayev. This became the first visit of a foreign head of state in the history of Kazakhstan and laid the foundation for relations with Turkey. During that visit, Turkey and Kazakhstan signed an agreement on cooperation in political, trade-economic, scientific-technical, ecological, cultural, social, communication and in other areas. On 15 March, the day after his arrival, he laid flowers at the Glory Memorial in the Park of 28 Panfilov Guardsmen and visited Medeu.

In September 1991, the Presidents Nazarbayev and Özal signed a declaration in Ankara containing the principles and objectives of bilateral relations. President Nursultan Nazarbayev defined during his visit to Turkey the 21st century as the “Turks’ century”. Turkey established diplomatic relations with Kazakhstan following the latter's independence after the dissolution of the Soviet Union. On 2 March 1992, the diplomatic relations were established and in the same year, the embassies of both countries were opened in Kazakhstan and Turkey.

== Economic relations ==
Turkey contributes 2 billion USD in Kazakhstan's total US$50 billion investment volume. Turkey accounts for 1.2% of Kazakhstan's total trade volume and has actively participated in the construction and textile industries of Kazakhstan. In 2005 trade turnover between the countries reached US$556.8 million, showing 13.8% growth from the $500 million level in 2004, and slated to climb to US$1 billion in trade turnover volume in 2006. Turkey hopes to expand investment in Kazakhstan's energy and telecommunications industries. Kazakhstan has increased quotas for the hiring of Turkish workers for construction projects. Kazakhstan is considering the construction of an oil refinery on the Black Sea jointly with Turkey.

== Strategic cooperation ==
In bolstering cooperation over energy resources, Kazakhstan has sought to assert its independence from Russia's influence. In July 2006, the People's Republic of China, Turkey, Azerbaijan and Georgia gathered in Astana to develop a transport corridor linking Central Asia with the South Caucasus and Western Europe that would increase the annual trade and cargo shipment capacity up to 30 million tons. Turkey has supported Kazakhstan's bid to join the World Trade Organization while the latter has actively supported Turkey's bid for membership in the European Union. Both nations have also sought to promote closer cooperation between Turkic nations of Central Asia.

=== Deepening of strategic partnership (2024–present) ===
In January 2025, the defense ministries of both nations signed a Military Cooperation Plan for 2025 in Ankara. The agreement, signed by Colonel Olzhas Khussainov and Brigadier General Erdoğan Çatal, prioritized joint combat training, military education, and peacekeeping interoperability.

On July 29, 2025, President Kassym-Jomart Tokayev paid an official visit to Ankara to co-chair the 5th meeting of the High-Level Strategic Cooperation Council with President Recep Tayyip Erdoğan. The summit resulted in the signing of 20 bilateral agreements, expanding cooperation beyond traditional sectors into artificial intelligence, aerospace, and energy infrastructure. Key documents included a memorandum on scientific cooperation in AI and space activities, as well as an agreement between KazMunayGas and the TPAO for joint hydrocarbon exploration.

Economic relations witnessed a significant shift in capital flows during early 2025. While Turkey has historically been a major investor in Kazakhstan, the first four months of 2025 saw Kazakhstan become the largest source of foreign direct investment (FDI) into Turkey, contributing $610 million—surpassing investments from the Netherlands and the United States for that period.

== Resident diplomatic missions ==
Republic of Kazakhstan

- Ankara (Embassy)
- Antalya (Consulate-General)
- Istanbul (Consulate-General)

Republic of Turkey

- Astana (Embassy)
- Aktau (Consulate-General)
- Almaty (Consulate-General)
- Turkistan (Consulate-General)

== Ambassadors of Turkey to Kazakhstan ==
1. Argun Ozpay (1992-1994)
2. Mustafa Ashula (1994-1995)
3. Kurtulus Tashkent (1995-1999)
4. Yavor Aldemir (1999-2004)
5. Hakki Taner Seben (2004-2008)
6. Atilla Guney (2008-2010)
7. Lale Yulker (2010-2012)
8. Omer Burkhan Tuzel (2012-2015)
9. Nevzat Uyanik (2015-2019)
10. Ufuk Ekichi (2020-)

== See also ==
- Foreign relations of Kazakhstan
- Foreign relations of Turkey
- Turkic Council
- Turks in Kazakhstan
