= Stroymontazh =

Stroymontazh Corporation
- Native name: Корпорация "Строймонтаж"
- Company type: Private (ЗАО)
- Industry: Real estate, Construction and development
- Founded: 1994; 32 years ago
- Founder: Artur Kirilenko, Sergei Polonsky
- Defunct: 2015; 11 years ago
- Fate: Dissolved
- Headquarters: St Petersburg, Russia
- Key people: Artur Kirilenko (CEO)
- Owner: Artur Kirilenko (100.00%)

Stroymontazh (Russian: Корпорация «Строймонтаж») was a Russian construction and property development company. Headquartered in Saint Petersburg, it was previously a market leader in residential construction in this region with a population size of more than 5.3 million, and had an international projects portfolio which included a 110,000 m2 development on the outskirts of Paris, France. The company suffered significantly as a result of the 2008 financial crisis and a corporate dispute with one of its creditors, Baltisky Bank. In 2010, Storymontazh was put into bankruptcy administration, and in July 2015, the company was dissolved.

== Owners and management ==
The principal company owner and CEO was Artur Kirilenko.

== Company history ==
The company was created in 1994 by Artur Kirilenko and Sergei Polonsky.

=== The 1990s ===
Stroymontazh initially specialised in construction and renovation work on already built residential properties. During the period of "non-payments crisis" of 1994-1995 in Russia, experiencing severe a liquidity deficit developers began to use apartments as a form of barter payment to Stroymontazh. Thus the company gained expertise in marketing residential properties and created a strong sales team. In 1996 Stroymontazh took on its first full-cycle project – the construction of an apartment building in Saint Petersburg's suburbs.

In 1995-98 Stroymontazh continued building up its competences as a general contractor on residential construction projects for the leading property developers of St. Petersburg, evolving into a full-fledged development company with its own portfolio of investments by 1998-99.

By 2000 Stroymontazh had become a corporation. Its portfolio included projects for whole new residential areas in St. Petersburg. It had its own architecture firm and business divisions in construction and building materials.

=== Division of the business with Polonsky ===
In 2000 Stroymontazh opened a subsidiary branch in Moscow headed up by Sergei Polonsky while Kirilenko concentrated on business in St. Petersburg. In 2002 Polonsky and Kirilenko divided up the business between them and in 2004 based on the Moscow subsidiary, Polonsky formed the company Mirax Group and subsequently exited Stroymontazh; following the division of the business, Artur Kirilenko became principal owner of Stroymontazh.

=== Business growth in the 2000s ===
In the years following 2000, Stroymontazh saw exponential growth in its business; if in 1999 Stroymontazh completed and commissioned six buildings with a total gross floor area of 55,000 square metres, then in 2002 the corporation built 120,000 square metres in Saint Petersburg, and in 2003 - 320,000 square metres, with 20 building projects running simultaneously.

In 2008 the company sold 286,000 square metres of residential property. The total portfolio totalled 1.5 million square metres. The company's subsidiary Hermitage SAS worked on a project to build 110,000 square metres of residential property in the outskirts of Paris, France.

=== Dispute with Baltisky Bank ===
At the height of the financial and economic crisis in 2008, as the construction sector experienced severe liquidity shortage, Baltisky Bank, one of Stroymontazh's creditors, raised interest rates on its existing loans several times and then requested immediate repayment before their maturity date. By 2009 the situation turned into a corporate war when Baltisky Bank launched a series of lawsuits against Stroymontazh with a view to seizing the company's assets at a fraction of their market value. At the end of April 2009 Baltisky Bank brought two claims against the main shareholder of Stroymontazh, Artur Kirilenko who was credit guarantor for the company for some of its loans; they were subsequently declined by the court. Criminal charges against Mr Kirilenko, which followed on from the litigation, were also dropped in 2011 as the inquiry found no sign of criminal conduct or wrongdoing in Kirilenko's actions.

In 2009 Stroymontazh filed for bankruptcy, describing it as a “necessary measure”, in order to defend the interests of private equity investors, in particular, the home-owners-to-be (“dolshchiki”) against the hostile actions of Baltisky Bank.

In 2010 the court granted Stroymontazh's application for bankruptcy, the company entered into bankruptcy administration and Kirilenko resigned as company president. By the start of insolvency proceedings, Stroymontazh had completed all its residential construction projects meeting all its obligations to homeowner-to-be investors under shared-equity schemes and restructured its debt to all but one creditor bank: the Bank of St Petersburg, Sberbank, Alfa-Bank, Baltinvestbank, Rosbank, Credit Europa Bank, and others, while only Baltiisky Bank rejected the restructuring offer. All transactions involving Stroymontazh's assets undertaken before the company went into administration were subsequently found by the inquiry to be economically justified, “that is, by improving the financial position of the company, they enabled the company to complete the construction of residential properties for private investors and repay the amounts owed to other creditors”. There was no sign of fraudulent activities, such as unfair (voidable) preference, asset hiding or any other criminal conduct associated with bankruptcy found by the inquiry.

Stroymontazh was in bankruptcy administration for 5 years and on 14 July 2015 the company was 'struck off' the Russian Companies Register and is deemed wound up .

== Main projects ==
From its formation the company built more than 800,000 square metres of residential property and 60,000 square metres of commercial property. In 2008 alone the company delivered 286,000 square metres of residential property. Its most notable development projects in Saint Petersburg include business centre and "Petrovsky Fort", apartment complex "Fifth Element", residential buildings "Monblan", "Academy", "Zvezdny" and many others.

Over 9 months of 2008 its sales revenues totalled 2.1 billion roubles, and profit 6.9 million roubles.
