= Alex Sapir =

American businessman

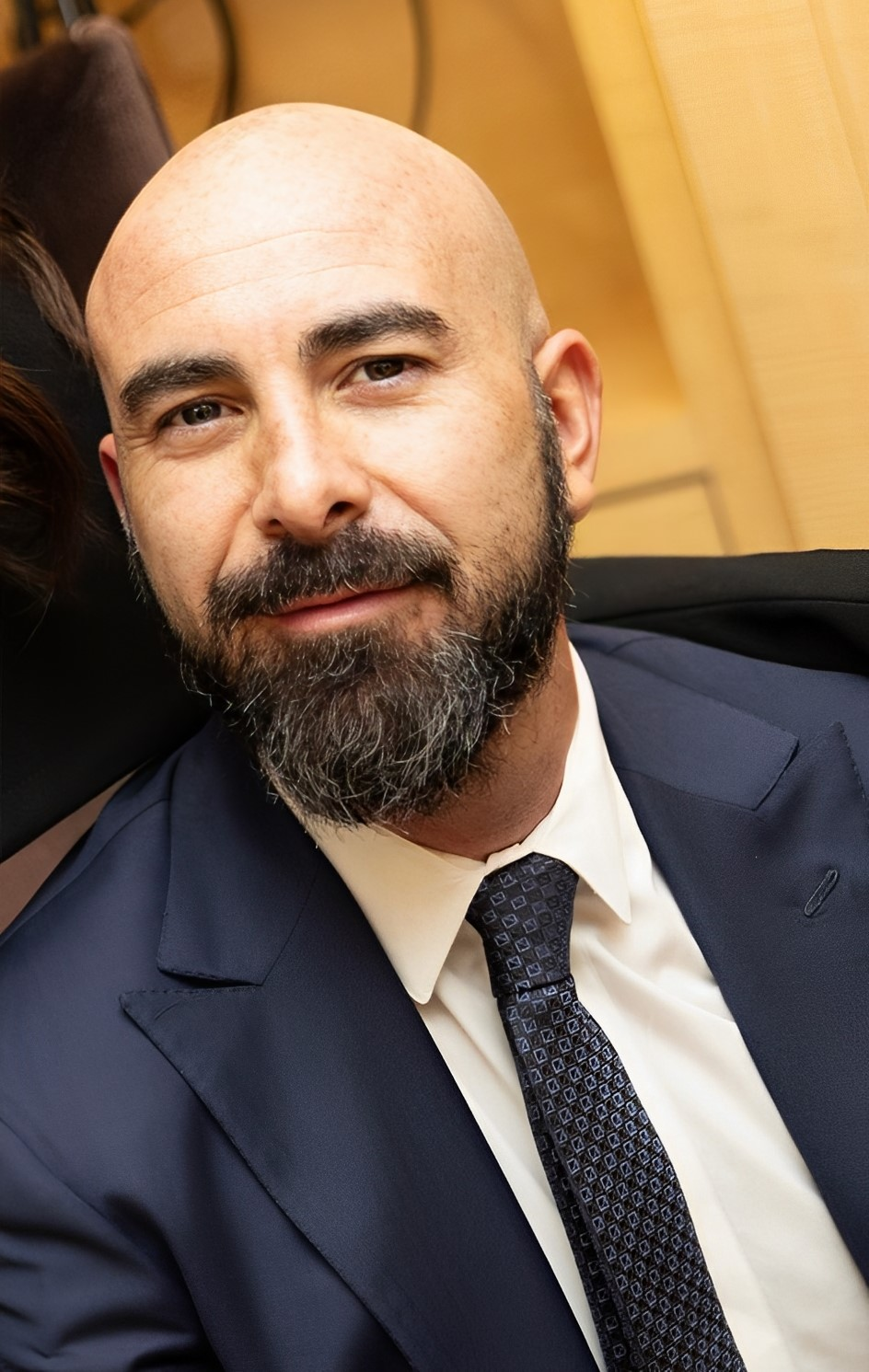
- Sapir in 2025
- Born: April 5, 1980 (age 46); United States
- Occupations: Real estate developer, investor
- Known for: President and CEO of the Sapir Organization, a company founded by his father
- Spouse: Yanina Sapir (m. 2010; div. 2022)
- Children: Three
- Father: Tamir Sapir

Alex Sapir is an American real estate developer, investor, and president and CEO of the Sapir Organization.

== Career ==
In 2006, Alex Sapir became CEO of The Sapir Organization. It is a real estate owner, operator, and developer pioneered by his late father, Tamir Sapir. That same year, he partnered with André Balaz to develop 15 William Street and collaborated with the Trump Organization to build Trump SoHo at 246 Spring Street. In 2010, Trump Soho opened as the first five-star hotel in downtown New York City.

In 2014, Alex Sapir acquired Sapir Corp Ltd, a company focused on real estate development and new construction. As president, he oversees over 1.7 million square feet of real estate, including projects such as Arte Surfside, Nomo Soho Hotel, and Miami 18. In 2014, Alex Sapir managed the repositioning of 11 Madison Avenue, a 2.3 million square foot building originally purchased by his father for $675 million. The property attracted major tenants such as Sony, William Morris Endeavor, and Yelp, diversifying its tenant roster.

In 2015, Alex brokered the sale of the property to SL Green for $2.6 billion, marking the largest single building sale in U.S. history.

In 2018, he purchased a home in the Venetian Islands for $17 million.

In May 2020, Alex Sapir submitted an offer to purchase approximately 13.29% of Sapir Corp.'s stock, valued at approximately $4.3 million, to take the company private. This move was considered strategic amid the pandemic's impact on stock prices and stock prices. Sapir, along with his partner Gerard Guez, already controlled the majority of the company.

In December 2020, Alex Sapir's development company sold the Arte by Antonio Citterio luxury penthouse in Surfside for $33 million, setting a new record for the area at $4,300 per square foot. In January 2022, Alex announced a successful sale of 16 luxury residences for $225 million, breaking numerous records. In December 2022, Alex refinanced its office properties at 260 and 261 Madison for $326 million, making it one of the few largest office financings during the COVID era.

In February 2025, Alex Sapir's company replaced Highgate Hotels with Crescent Hotel Management to operate the NoMo Soho hotel in New York City. This change, which became effective on March 15, was intended to improve service and reduce management fees, as Crescent would initially charge 1.5% compared to Highgate's 3%.

In April 2026, The Sapir Organization, led by Chairman and CEO Alex Sapir, was announced as a development partner with The Trump Organization, Archi Group, Biograpi Living, Blox Group, and Finvest Georgia in the new development Trump Tower Tbilisi. Designed by Gensler, the tower is planned to reach approximately 70 stories, making it the tallest building in Georgia, and serves as the centerpiece of the roughly $2 billion "Tbilisi Downtown" development, a six-tower, 600,000-square-meter mixed-use complex offering luxury residences, retail, dining, and hotel space. Sapir said, "Returning to Georgia for the first time since I was five years old was an emotional experience for me. It reminded me of how deep my connection to the country runs and inspired me to think about how I could contribute in a meaningful way. I am extremely proud and honored to be building our second Trump building in the country where my parents were born and raised. I believe the most powerful impact I can make is through transformative development and bringing global luxury real estate to Georgia—building on the vision and development philosophy the Sapir family and brand have pursued for decades." The project marked The Sapir Organization's first international commercial development, expanding a firm that has overseen more than $7 billion in residential, hospitality, and commercial real estate primarily in New York City and Miami.

== Family dispute ==
In July 2020, Alex Sapir filed a lawsuit against his relatives, the Rotem brothers, seeking $100 million in damages. The conflict arose from an ongoing family dispute regarding the control and ownership of certain assets within the Sapir Organization. In November 2022, Alex Sapir and Rotem Rosen settled their long-standing legal disputes after a court ruling dismissed Rosen's $103 million claim from Tamir Sapir's estate. The settlement followed multiple lawsuits, including a $100 million lawsuit filed by Sapir against Rosen for alleged theft of funds and insider trading.

== Philanthropy ==
Alex is involved in philanthropy, supporting causes such as the Make-a-Wish Foundation, where he founded the Tamir Sapir Basketball Fund, St. Jude Children's Hospital, the American Cancer Society, the Western Wall Heritage Foundation, and Shaare Zedek Medical Center in Jerusalem.
