= Congregation of Georgian Jews =

Orthodox synagogue in Queens, New York

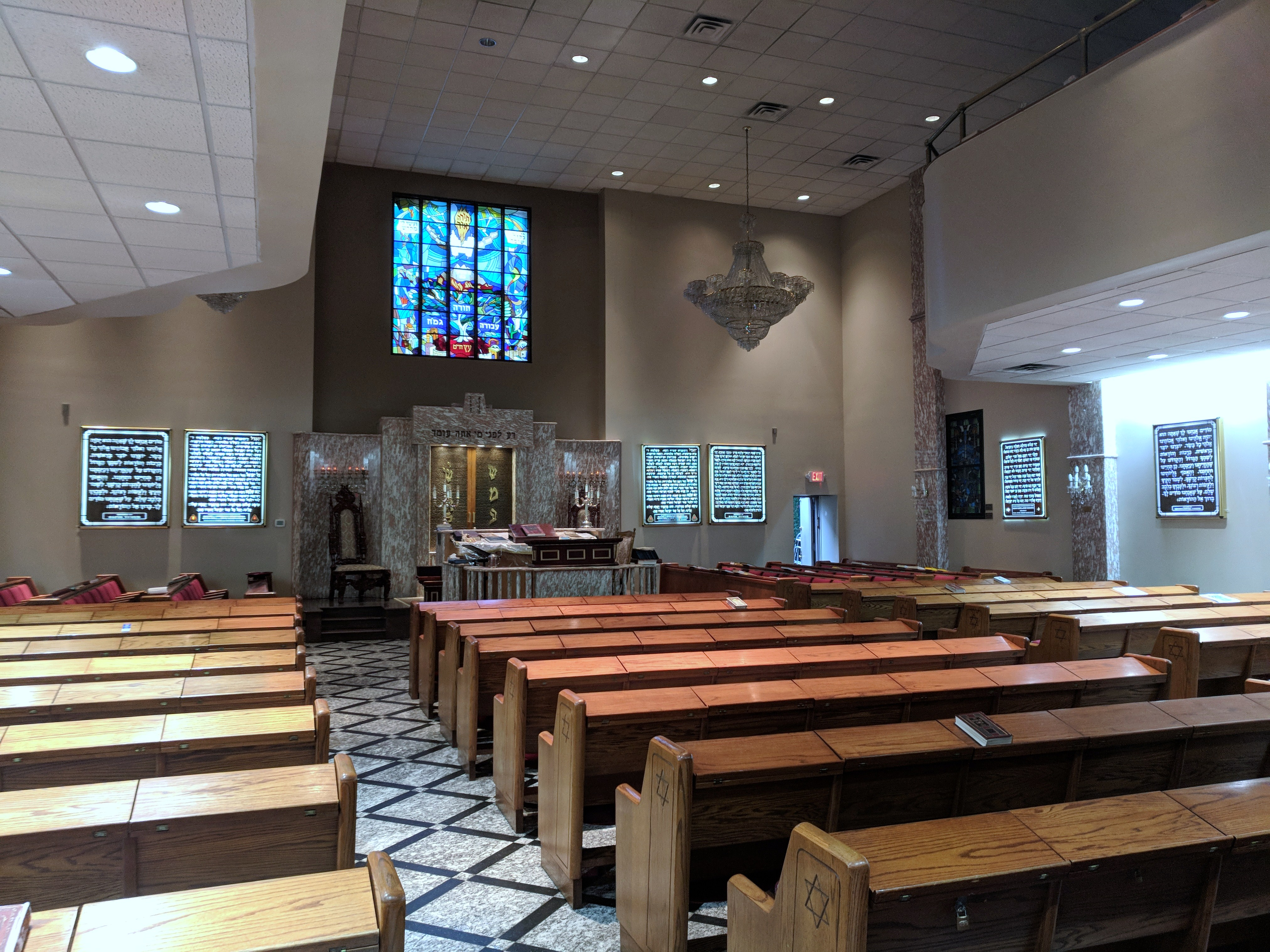
- Congregation of Georgian Jews synagogue

- Location in New York City

Religion
- Affiliation: Orthodox Judaism
- Ecclesiastical or organizational status: Synagogue
- Leadership: Rabbi Avraham Ashville; Rabbi Aharon Chein
- Status: Active

Location
- Location: 6304 Yellowstone Boulevard, Forest Hills, Queens, New York City, New York
- Country: United States
- Interactive map of Congregation of Georgian Jews
- Coordinates: 40°44′03″N 73°51′10″W

Architecture
- Funded by: Tamir Sapir

Website
- congregationofgeorgianjews.com

The Congregation of Georgian Jews is an Orthodox Jewish synagogue located at 6304 Yellowstone Boulevard, in the Forest Hills neighborhood of Queens in New York City, New York, United States. The members of the congregation are predominantly late-twentieth-century immigrants from the Republic of Georgia.

== History ==
The synagogue building was made possible by a donation from Tamir Sapir, a Georgian Jewish philanthropist.

When the Republic of Georgia released a postage stamp honoring the nineteenth century Rabbi Abraam Khvoles, the unveiling ceremony was held at the synagogue by Revaz Adamia, representative of Georgia to the United Nations.

During the August 2008 Russian invasion of Georgia, U.S. Rep. Anthony Weiner held an emergency meeting at the synagogue for the Christian and Jewish Georgian community living in New York. the synagogue is the only large, monumental structure built by Georgians in New York City.

== Clergy ==
As of 2013, the Senior Rabbi was Avraham Ashville and the Rabbi and youth director was Aharon Chein.
