= Sergei Polonsky =

Russian Oligarch

- Сергей Полонский
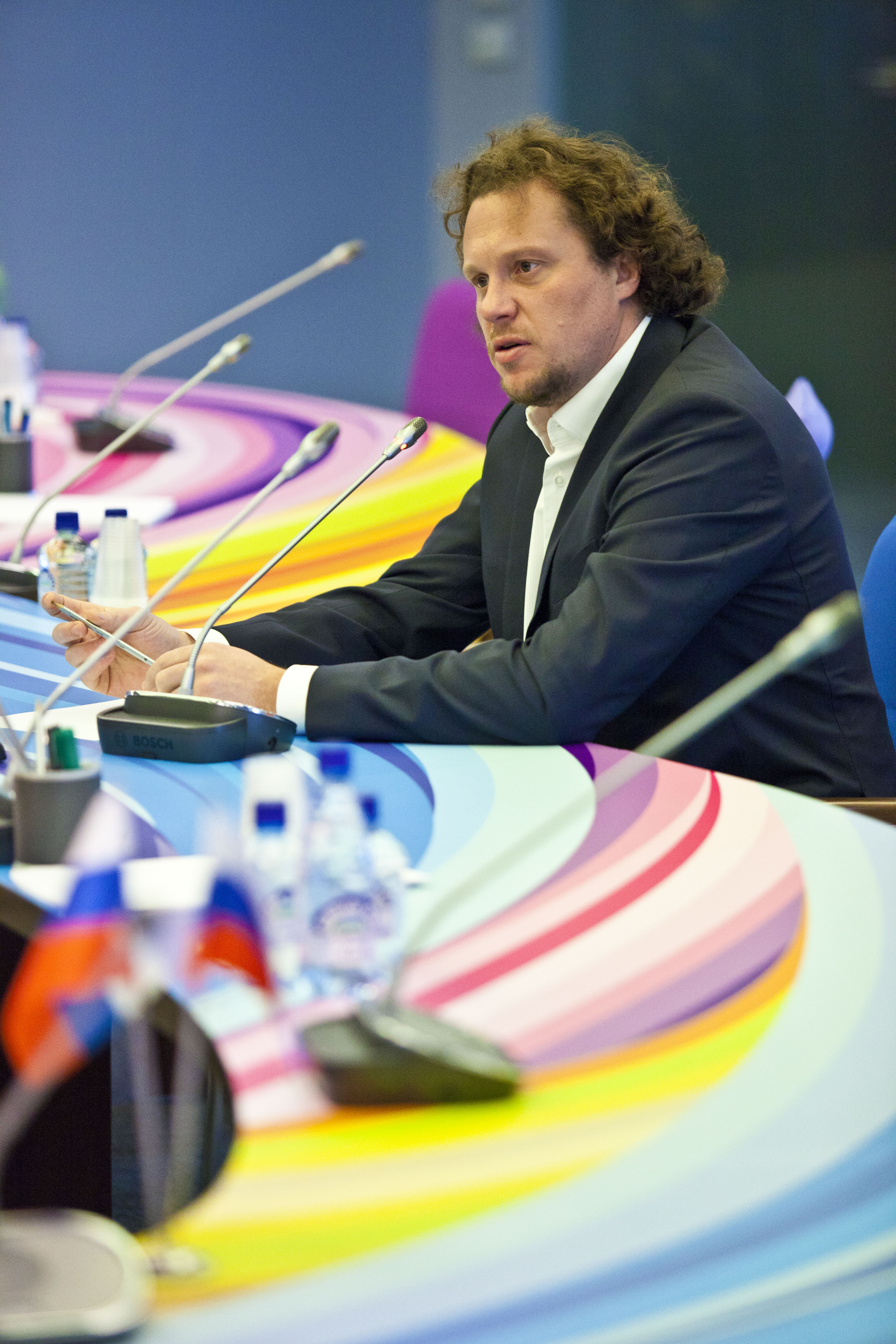
- Polonsky in 2012
- Born: 1 December 1972 (age 53); Leningrad, Russian SFSR, Soviet Union
- Education: St. Petersburg State University of Architecture and Civil Engineering
- Occupations: Real Estate entrepreneur, owner of Potok, formerly Mirax Group
- Spouse: Olga Deripasko

Sergei Yurievich Polonsky (Russian: Сергей Юрьевич Полонский; born 1 December 1972) is a Russian businessman. He is the owner and head of one of the largest real estate companies in Russia, previously known as Mirax Group (2004–2011). He was one of the richest men in Russia before the 2008 financial crisis with a net worth of $5 billion and projects in 11 countries in the world. Now, he is a shareholder and investor in a number of commercial structures incorporated by the holding company Potok.

== Early life ==
Polonsky was born 1 December 1972 in Leningrad, Soviet Union (now Saint Petersburg, Russia). His father, Yuri Polonsky, is Jewish by ethnicity, and his mother, Nina Makusheva, is Russian. Polonsky finished secondary school No. 99 of the Vyborg District of Leningrad. In 1989, he joined the airborne troops. He completed his military service in the 21st Separate Air Assault Brigade (1990–1992), which was stationed in the time of the armed conflict between South Ossetia and Georgia in the combat zone at Tskhinvali.

In 2000, Polonsky graduated from the St. Petersburg State University of Architecture and Civil Engineering. He qualified as an economist and manager with a specialization in economics and management of building enterprises. In 2002, he defended his PhD thesis "Formation of Functional Procurement Strategies in Construction".. In 2008, Polonsky attempted doctoral, but, considering the academic council biased, he withdrew the work and posted the text of the thesis for an open discussion on the Internet.

== Career ==
=== Stroymontazh ===
In 1994, when Polonsky was 22, he founded Stroymontazh LLC with his longtime friend Artur Kirilenko. Stroymontazh was a construction and real estate firm set up with the initial intention of selling apartments that they had plastered and finished. However, when the building owners ran into financial difficulty, they began to pay the pair in apartments. It was through these means that Polonsky and Kirilenko took control of their first unfinished building, starting them on the path to being property developers. In 1996 the company took its first contract job, completing an apartment project in St. Petersburg for a company called Lenenergo. "The house had an area of 22,000 sq. m. That year, the entire Leningrad region finished, probably less. I thought they would thank me, but the woman who came to take over the house refused to take it for another six months for various reasons. We did it only by a miracle," Polonsky said for forbes. By the end of the 90s, Stroymontazh was one of the largest players in the St. Petersburg real estate market.

During the 1998 Russian financial crisis, Polonsky and Kirilenko began to achieve huge financial success. According to The New York Times, by paying construction costs in rubles and selling property in dollars they were able to profit in the lag time between construction and sale as the value of the rouble fell. The company rapidly amassed wealth and made a name for itself as one of Saint Petersburg's largest developers, eventually building Petrovsky Fort, a 540,000-square-foot complex that became the standard for business centers in the former capital.

Polonsky opened an office in Moscow in 2000. Two years later, Mayor Luzkhov appointed him as an adviser. Polonsky was not yet 30.

=== Mirax Group ===
In 2004, the Moscow branch of Stroymontazh was renamed "Mirax Group" and in 2006, split from Stroymontazh, the Saint Petersburg branch, with Polonsky at the head of Mirax and Kirilenko at the head of Stroymontazh. Both men maintained 10% ownership of the other's company until 2009 when they each sold their respective stakes.

Mirax carried out projects in Russia, Ukraine, Turkey, Cambodia, United States, Montenegro, United Kingdom, Switzerland, Vietnam, France. At its peak in the late 2000s, Mirax Group's assets amounted to more than 12 million square meters of real estate, with 2008 revenues estimated at $1.65 billion and net profits of $616.4 million. Some notable projects are outlined below.

==== Moscow's Federation Tower ====
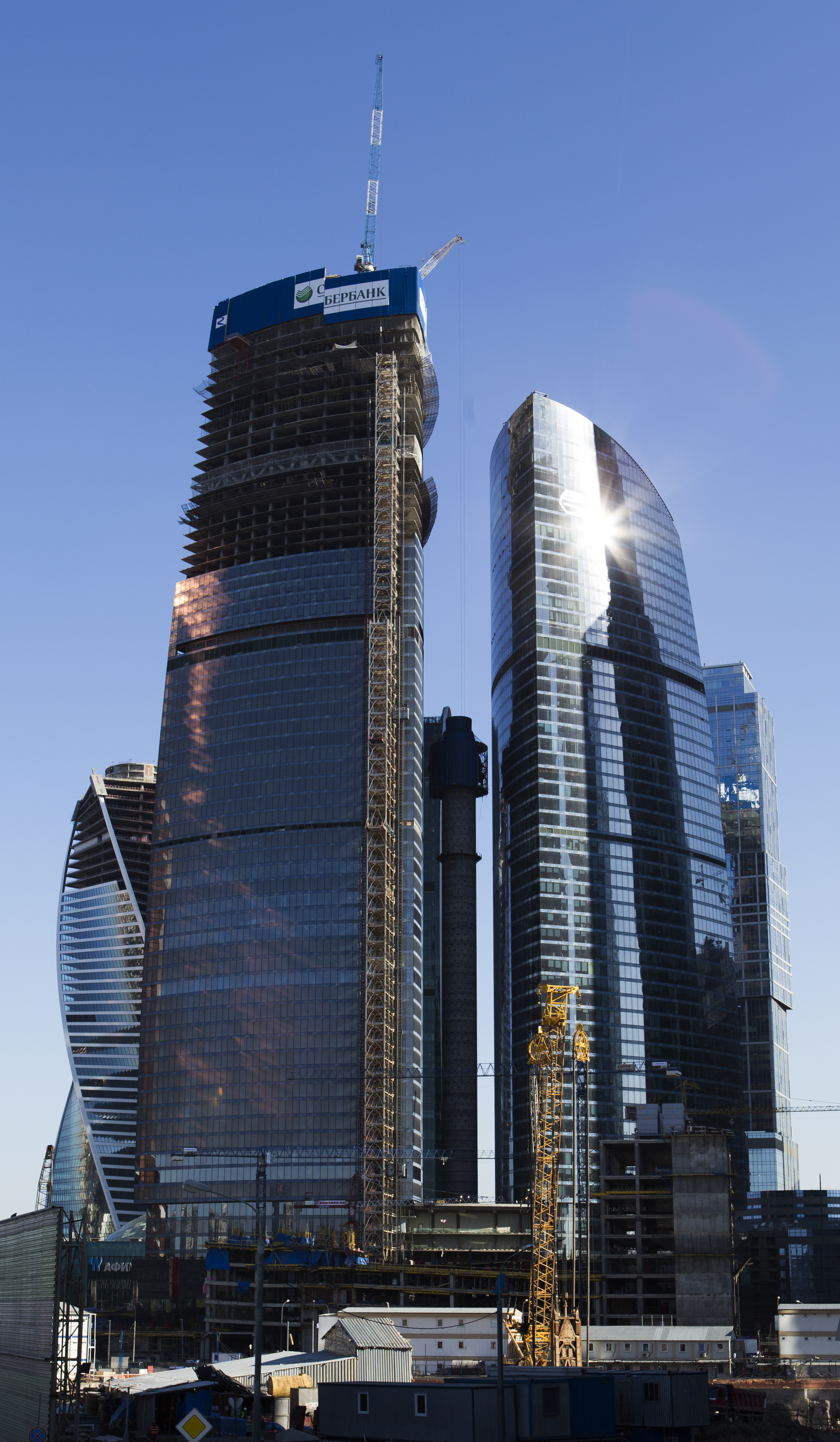
Federation Tower

Identified as Moscow's first skyscraper, the Federation Tower is recognized as the tallest building in Europe. The building consists of two towers, the taller one with 93 floors and a height of 1,161 feet, and the other with 63 floors. The towers have 4.5 million square feet of high-end office space, luxury apartments, shops, restaurants, and a 44-story Grand Hyatt hotel. A spire was to be also built which would have extended the complex's height to 450 meters (1,476 feet) as well as provided an observation deck, but it was never completed and was dismantled afterward.

In 2009, The Federation Tower won the FIABCI World Prix d’Excellence Award (Office Category Winner).

Construction of the project stalled in 2008 due to the Great Recession; however, it was resumed in August 2011 and completed in 2017.

==== Korona residential property ====
Korona was a Moscow landmark project, aiming to reflect state-of-the-art achievements in architecture, planning, construction technologies, and landscaping. The ceremony of laying the first stone in the foundation of the Korona Project intended to demonstrate a "new, unusual, vigorous and assertive style" of the young businessmen from St. Petersburg.

==== Golden Keys ====
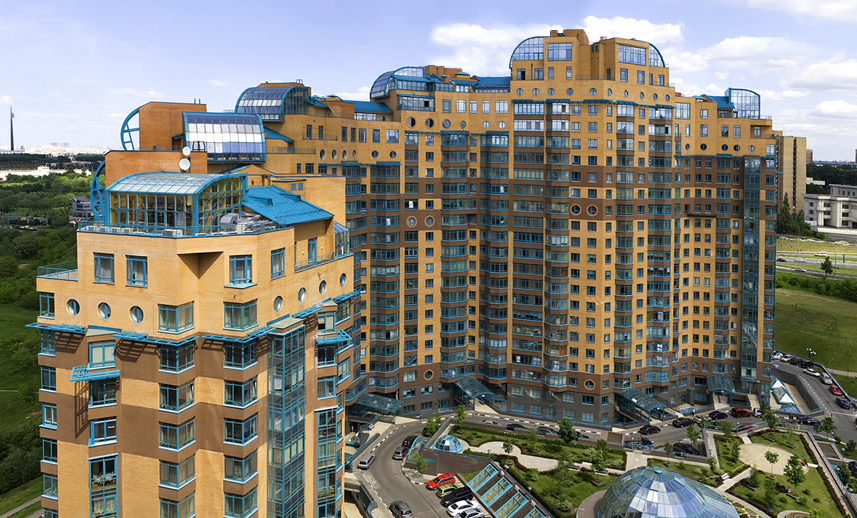
Golden Keys 2

Golden Keys 2 Residential Property was the 2nd project implemented by Polonsky's team. Polonsky suggested a comfortable "town within the city" living concept where high-rise residential buildings are mixed with a cottage village named "Y".

After that, the company launched new business centers Pollars and Europe Building. In 2002–2007, the company started the construction of such residential compounds as Taganka House, Kutuzovskaya Riviera, Mirax Park and the Federation Tower – a mixed-use complex in the Moscow International Business Center – Moscow City.

==== Other projects in Moscow ====
Residential Complex "Dubrovskaya Sloboda" - 2 buildings of 19-30 floors. 982 apartments (47-218 sq. m.), 8 penthouses (173-375 sq. m.). 2.25 Hectares of landscaped territory.

Residential Complex "Kutuzovskaya Riviera" - 4 buildings 30-35 floors. 840 apartments (76-966 sq. m.). More than 40,000 sq. m. underground Parking. It has its own small nature reserve with several species of animals and birds.

The Mirax Park residential complex consists of 4 high-rise buildings of 31-37 floors, a multi-section building of 10-14 floors. 1035 apartments. 16 Hectares of landscaped territory combined with the residential complex "Korona".

The MIRAX-SCHOOL Children's educational complex is a 260-seat preschool. A comprehensive school with 550 places.

The residential complex "Well House" consists of 4 buildings of 30-48 floors, 2 low-rise sections of 5-7 floors. 655 apartments (43-200 sq. m.) 2.48 Hectares of landscaped territory The residential complex "House on Taganka" has 14-18 floors. 207 apartments (63-158 sq. m.). 12 penthouses.

The residential complex "Fort Kutuzov" has 22 floors. 156 apartments (57-138 sq. m.). Winter garden with exotic plants.

The office Building "Europe Building" has 15 floors. the total area is 16,000 sq. m.

The Pollars Office Center has 7-16 floors. The total area is 55,500 sq. m.

==== Foreign projects ====
Montenegro

Astra-Mentenegro resort town - 43 villas, a hotel complex, a high-rise residential building. The total area of 120,000 sq. m. is more than 9 hectares of landscaped territory.

Astra Montenegro is located in the heart of the Budva Riviera, on the cape separating the city of Budva and the village of Becici. Astra Montenegro includes a wellness complex, fitness center, SPA center, children's club, zoo, marina, casino.

Cambodia

Mirax Resort Boutique Hotel in Koh Dek Kul Private Island is the only operating 5* private island resort in Cambodia. The resort has a cascade of saltwater pools, an exclusive collection of historical treasures, a unique diving base in the hotel, where each of the 12 rooms has its own exotic style.

France

Since 2004, Polonsky, together with Hermitage and Artur Kirilenko, wanted to build residential complexes with a total area of 50 thousand square meters and a 323-meter skyscraper designed by Norman Foster in the suburbs of Paris. Investments in the skyscraper alone were estimated at €2 billion. But in March 2011, Hermitage CEO Emin Iskenderov bought out Polonsky's share.

Switzerland

Since 2007, Mirax has been planning the construction of the Aminona Luxury Resort ski resort in the Swiss resort of Aminona — luxury apartments, a 500-room hotel complex, a chalet and a shopping center. The investment was estimated at $830 million.

USA

In Miami, Mirax acquired a stake in the Aqua project from the American Dacra Development corporation in 2007: the developer received 13 villas without finishing and the right to build up housing for about 3.4 hectares more. The termination of the project or its sale was not reported

Turkey

In Kemer, Turkey, Mirax became the owner of the Sungate Port Royal Hotel in 2007. It included more than 900 rooms and villas, and the total area of the territory was 250 thousand square meters. m. In Mirax itself, investments were estimated at €340 million.

Vietnam

Mirax acquired a plot on the Nha Trang coast in Vietnam in 2008 for the construction of a 200-bed hotel and 100 villas.

England

In the historic center of London, Mirax was going to reconstruct a complex of residential buildings of the XIX century "Cornwell Terrace" with a total area of more than 8 thousand square meters. m. The total investment in the project was supposed to be about £10 million. The company held a corresponding presentation in July 2008.

Since 2008, Mirax has also been involved in the construction of a 52-storey skyscraper on the south bank of the Thames.

== 2008 economic crisis and restructuring into Potok ==
In 2008, Polonsky was the first developer who openly admitted that the Russian real estate market was affected by the 2008 financial crisis. According to Anton Chernigovsky, who wrote the article "Polonsky Makes a Demarche" published in the Business Magazine, "his competitors kept arguing zestfully that real estate was the last thing to be threatened by the crisis. But in as early as two months, they had to withdraw their words and start to urgently suspend their projects and patch up financial gaps".

The downturn hit Mirax Group hard; in August 2008, Polonsky published an open letter in his blog, where he said that during the previous year, Mirax Group could not receive any credit to continue construction and had not sold any real estate over the past few months. Commissioning deadlines, therefore, needed to be reviewed and extended.

On 10 October 2008, Sergei Polonsky announced that he would eat his tie if the elite apartments' prices did not rise by over 25% in 1.5 years. The forecast came true with a half a year delay, and on 31 May 2011 Polonsky ate a piece of a true tie at Minaev LIVE, a TV show hosted by Sergey Minaev.

In July 2009, Alpha Bank acquired all of Mirax Group's debt obligations to Credit Suisse and called in the company's debts in an effort to bring the company to bankruptcy and take control of it. Polonsky described the steps taken by Alpha Bank as 'premeditated systematic actions aimed at divesting and acquiring' the corporation's assets adding that Mirax Group had been 'completely unready for the sudden turn of events.'

In February 2011, Sberbank of Russia (Savings Bank of the Russian Federation) decided to grant Mirax Group a $373 million credit for six years. On 3 March 2011, at a media conference, Sergey Polonskiy declared that the Mirax Group Board decided to liquidate the Mirax brand. He also promised to fulfill all the obligations of the Group to complete the projects and repay the debts. In May 2011, the works at the unfinished projects were resumed.

On 1 December 2011, Polonsky renamed his company "Potok", and this company inherited all the structures and liabilities of the former Mirax Group.

On 6 July 2012, by virtue of the shareholders' agreement, Polonsky bought out the shares of the minority shareholders of the "Potok" (Flow) company and became the owner of Potok's 100% block of shares.

== Kutuzovskaya Mile takeover and embezzlement charges ==
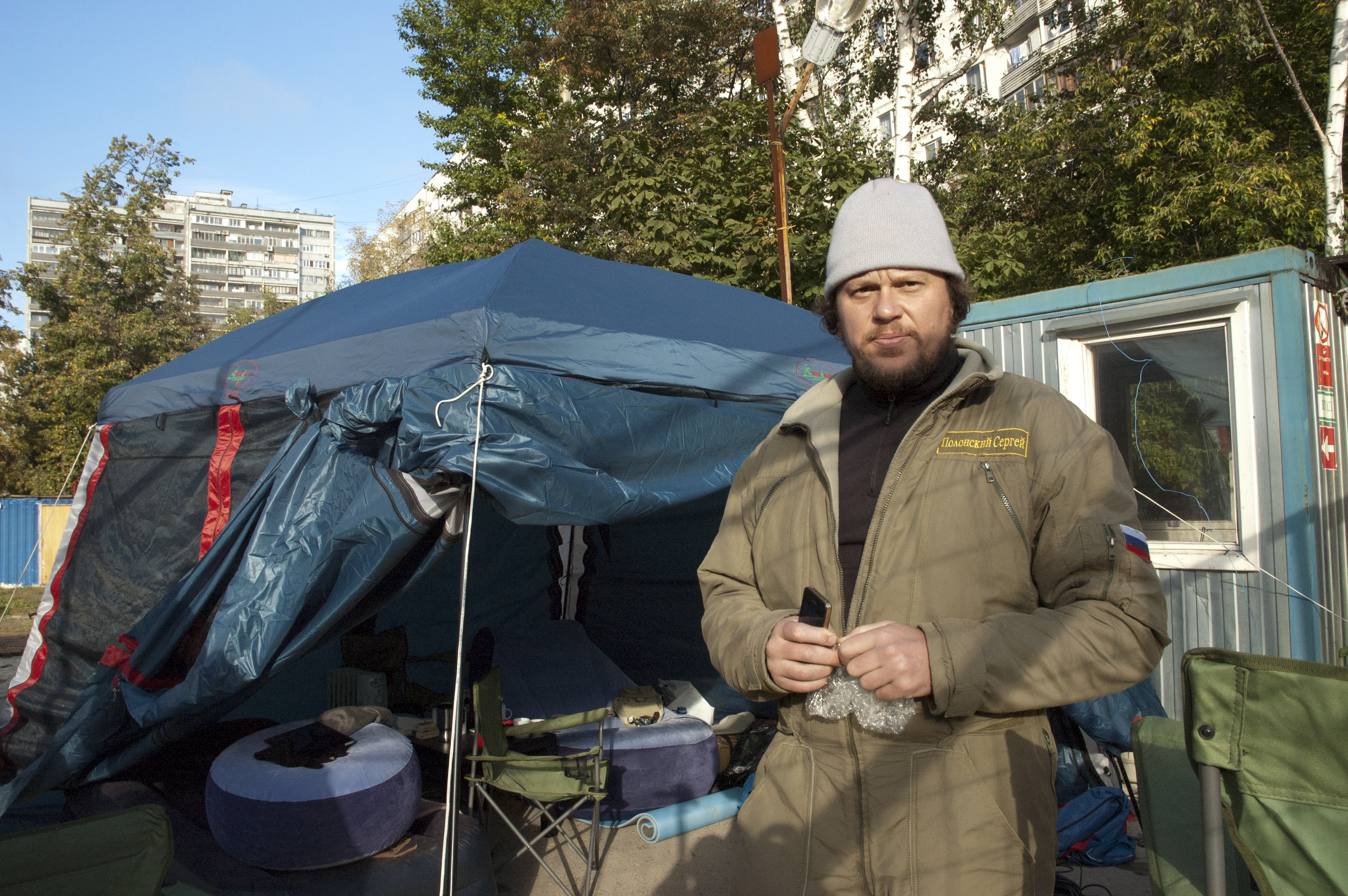
September 2011

One notable project to stall as a result of the economic crisis was the Kutuzovskaya Mile residential complex. Polonsky became involved in the project through Mirax in 2005 at the request of the Moscow Mayor Resin Rosltak. The project had been started in 2002 by FTsSR (Federal Centre for Social Development), a company with many political connections but little experience in developing real estate. Mirax took control of the project and agreed to give FTsSR 5% of the finished apartments. Mirax proceeded to invest 2.5 billion rubles in developing the project before work was forced to stop in 2009.

FTsSR terminated the contract in January 2010. Polonsky claimed this was done unlawfully, leading to disputes between FTsSR and Mirax Group. However, according to FTsSR, funding from Mirax Group had stopped. In September 2011 FTsSR forcibly took control of the site using a private security firm. Polonsky has described FTsSR's actions as a raid in the media. "At this very moment the Project site, located at the construction site of the residential quarter Kutuzovskaya Mile, is being forcibly taken over", the company said in an official statement. To protest against the actions of the Moscow authorities, Polonsky declared a hunger strike and continued to provide his round-the-clock presence at the construction site. The Moscow Chief Directorate of the Ministry for the Internal Affairs of the Russian Federation stated at the time however that "the police stayed uninvolved in the conflict." and that the law enforcement officers present at the scene were there to "maintain public order".

Subsequently, in September 2012, the Russian Ministry of Internal Affairs (MVD) began investigating Polonsky in relation to the Kutuzovskaya Mile project. Prosecutors claimed that between 2007 and 2008, Polonsky, through Mirax Group subsidiaries Avanta and Concordia Asset Management, took 5.78 billion rubles in down payments from 80 individuals hoping to buy apartments. They claimed that contractual obligations were not fulfilled and the funds were illegally diverted by Polonsky to other Mirax Group entities. In June 2013, the MDV charged Polonsky in absentia with embezzlement. Polonsky strongly denies any accusations of wrongdoing and has expressed his willingness to be investigated as he believes that "no legal offense has been committed."

According to the Russian publication Novaya Gazeta, the Kutuzovskaya Mile issue has become a "bottomless pit of internet folklore". Polonsky maintains that he transferred 2.5 billion rubles to FTsSR prior to the termination of their contract, which would have been more than sufficient to meet the contractual obligations entered into by his companies. He added that the remaining funds had not been diverted out of the project and had stayed within Mirax Group. In an open letter dated 2 October 2013 Polonsky admitted to "incompetent management" and expressed his willingness to pay $12 million in compensation to his creditors. He also sought to assure all investors that their apartments would be completed.

The embezzlement charges, Polonsky believes, are part of an attempt by FTsSR and the Moscow government to take the Kutuzovskaya project away from him and hand control to Arkady Rotenberg, a rival property developer with close ties to the Russian president Vladimir Putin

== Arrest in Cambodia ==
In late 2012, Sergei Polonsky and two other Russians – Konstantin Baglay and Alexander Karachinsky – were arrested by the Cambodian police. They were suspected of unlawfully depriving several Cambodian seamen of their liberty.

Polonsky protested at the arrest and the conditions of his incarceration, writing on his blog "After being detained, none of the detainees, including myself, was allowed to make a telephone call, we were denied our right to a counsel for legal assistance and to an interpreter, although the law of Cambodia provides for these rights. At present, they are holding me in a cell without an air conditioner at a temperature exceeding +35 degrees Celsius in the shade and with horrible sanitary conditions. According to the Cambodian counsels and interpreters, they regularly receive threats and warnings not to work with me from unknown people." He also made several petitions to the Russian Ministry of Foreign Affairs; however, they failed to take any steps to help.

Polonskiy also had strong relationship with King of Cambodia. Businessman was investing into the economy of the country and helping people.

K. Baglay and A. Karachinsky were released from custody uncharged on 11 March 2013 and Polonsky was released on bail on 3 April 2013.

On 15 May 2015, Polonsky was arrested again in Sihanoukville, where authorities said he had been living for two years with an expired visa, which was not true at all. After it was officially proven that Polinskiy had valid visa. Cambodian Authorities has deported this fugitive Russian tycoon living illegally after he was accused of embezzling $175 million in his homeland. He was put on a flight to Moscow via Vietnam on Sunday morning.

== Interpol and extradition to Russia ==
On 14 October 2013, at the request of the Russian authorities, Polonsky was issued with a "red notice" by Interpol and on 7 November 2013 the Russian Prosecutor's Office sent Cambodia an official request for Polonsky's extradition. Polonsky was subsequently detained. However, on 14 January 2014, the Phnom Penh Appeal Court ruled that the grounds given by Russia for Polonsky's extradition were insufficient.

New charges were brought against Polonsky in February 2014 and sent to Cambodia. However, on 16 April 2014, the Supreme Court of Cambodia ruled that Cambodia does not have an extradition treaty with Russia, and so Polonsky could not be extradited on any grounds.

Polonsky was eventually deported from Cambodia and sent back to Moscow on 17 May 2015.

A Moscow court had scheduled his trial date for 11 October 2015.

On 12 July 2017, the court found Polonsky guilty on two cases of major fraud and embezzlement, deciding he should face five years in prison. However, the court ruled the crime constituted a business dispute and Polonsky would only face punishment for the "non-fulfillment of contractual obligations". Plonskiy was released in the courtroom.

== UK High Court case against Alexander Dobrovinsky ==
On 7 May 2014, Polonsky filed a lawsuit at the UK High Court against his former lawyer, Alexander Dobrovinsky. Polonsky claimed that Dobrovinsky, along with his colleague Natalia Levinzon, the London-based law firm Dobrovinsky, and Partners LLP helped steal £300 million from him by pretending that he was negotiating a sale of his company, Potok, to Roman Abramovich whilst Polonsky was detained in Cambodia. Dobrovinsky, a known advocate of numerous Russian oligarchs, was in fact, it transpired, selling the business to Roman Trotsenko, an existing shareholder in Potok, with whom Polonsky had previously refused to do business. Polonsky claimed he had received only a few million dollars of the hundreds of millions he says he is owed, and alleged that the lawyers were acting for Mr. Trotsenko all along.

== Neulovimiye film ==
In March 2015, Polonsky announced plans for a $1 billion lawsuit against U.S. filmmaker 20th Century Fox because of similarities between himself and a villain in one of the studio's films. Neulovimiye ("Elusive"), a Russian-language movie released in 2015 by 20th Century Fox, has a primary character named Sergei Polyansky who kills a young woman with his car and displays many negative character traits. In addition to having a similar name, film critics have acknowledged similarities in physical appearance between the real-life Polonsky and the fictional Polyansky. The lawsuit has yet to be filed.

== Politics ==
=== Presidential candidacy ===
Polonsky expressed interest in running for President of Russia in the 2018 Russian Presidential Election. Polonsky was nominated by an initiative group made up of 520 activists on 24 December. He filed registration documents with the CEC on the same day. Polonsky's documents were rejected because the initiative group did not have enough members. In addition, his past criminal conviction prevented him from becoming a candidate. At the same time, Polonsky announced the creation of a political party "For All" with which he intended to participate in 2021 legislative election, and will run for President in 2024. However, the party did not participate in the 2021 election, and changes to the Russian constitution in 2020 barred Polonsky from running for president in 2024 due to him obtaining Cambodian citizenship.

== Awards and prizes ==
- Merit badge of Honorary Russian Builder
- The Construction Olympus – 2002 award in the personal category "Manager of Complete-Cycle Construction Company"
- Personal golden medal, diploma and personal badge of honor of the French National Association for National Industry Support (Societe d’Encouragement pour L’Industrie Nationale, SPI)

== Educational initiatives and volunteer work ==
- In March 2008, Polonsky refused to defend his doctorate thesis in the State Commission for Academic Degrees and Titles and organized a public defense in his blog.
- Polonsky arranges regular master classes for university students (MSU, MGIMO, HSE, MFPA, and others) and lectures for the Nazvanie.NET personnel. The most popular topics of his master classes and lectures are enterprising, personal development and success strategies in business.
- Starting from the 2009–10 academic year, Polonsky is the chairman of the Management in Development Business Department set up under the agreement with the Moscow Finance and Industry Academy for training young specialists for the benefit of construction companies.
- In 2002 Polonsky was elected Senator and president of the International Chamber of Youth.

In certain periods, Polonsky was a member of various voluntary associations: in 2001–2005, he was a member of the Council of Entrepreneurs under the Mayor and Government of Moscow, and in 2001–2010 he was a member of the "Business Russia" organization of entrepreneurs. In 2003, Polonsky was elected vice president of the Russian Academy of Business and Enterprising, in 2004, he became Vice President of the public association of professional managers, the International Club of the Best Managers of the New Era. In 2005, Polonsky was one of those who established the Russian Builders' Association, and until now remains its first vice president.

== Space travel ==
In 2004 Polonsky prepared for a spaceflight to the International Space Station, completing a full cosmonaut training course. The flight did not take place, however; because of his height, there was not enough room for his legs under the console, which could have led to injury as the spacecraft landed.
