= Conrad Fort Lauderdale =

Condominium-hotel resort in Florida, US

- Interactive map of the Conrad Fort Lauderdale area
- Former names: Trump International Hotel & Tower Fort Lauderdale

General information
- Status: Completed
- Type: Residential, Hotel
- Location: Fort Lauderdale, Florida, 551 North Fort Lauderdale Beach Boulevard
- Coordinates: 26.130666°N 80.103496°W
- Construction started: July 2005
- Opening: 2017
- Operator: Conrad Hotels

Technical details
- Floor count: 24

Design and construction
- Architecture firm: Michael Graves and Associates; Oscar Garcia Architects
- Developer: Stillman Bayrock Merrimac LLC / SB Hotel Associates LLC (Trump project); Orchestra Hotels and Resorts (Conrad project)
- Main contractor: Stiles Construction Company (Trump project); Moss & Associates (Conrad project)

Other information
- Number of units: 290

Website
- https://www.conradfortlauderdale.com/

The Conrad Fort Lauderdale is a luxury condominium-hotel resort located on ocean-front property on North Fort Lauderdale Beach Boulevard in Fort Lauderdale, Florida. The resort includes 181 condo-hotel units, as well as 109 condominium units in a separate building known as The Ocean Resort Residences. The project initially began construction in July 2005, as Trump International Hotel & Tower Fort Lauderdale. Donald Trump lent his name to the project through a licensing deal before being elected the President of the United States, with New York developer Roy Stillman and Bayrock Group as the project developers. The project's opening was initially scheduled for 2007, but was delayed several times.

Trump removed his name from the unfinished project in 2009, after the developer defaulted on the licensing agreement. By that time, lawsuits alleging breach of contract and misleading advertising had been filed against the project by several condominium buyers. Foreclosure for the project was filed in March 2010, and the building was sold in a foreclosure auction in March 2012. After several ownership changes and a $70 million renovation, the project opened in October 2017.

== History ==
=== Early history and construction ===
The property was initially occupied by the Merrimac and Gold Coast hotels, which were built on Fort Lauderdale Beach Boulevard in the 1950s. A condo hotel project was approved for the site in 2001. In December 2003, Donald Trump was interested in the proposed Gold Coast Merrimac Resort, which had been planned for the site of the two hotels. The 24-story resort had been approved for 240 hotel rooms and 80 timeshare units. By February 2005, Trump had become involved in the project, which was renamed as Trump International Hotel & Tower Fort Lauderdale, with New York developer Roy Stillman and Bayrock Group as partners. The project's developer was Stillman Bayrock Merrimac LLC. Stillman had been brought onto the project less than a year earlier, and arranged financing for it. Trump was also an equity investor in the project, and lent his name to it through a licensing agreement.

The project was designed by Michael Graves and Associates in collaboration with Oscar Garcia Architects. Graves redesigned the hotel to decrease its previous size. The redesign included 22 fewer units and 215 fewer parking spaces than when the project was initially approved in 2001. The 24-story tower was designed to resemble a luxury cruise liner from 1925. The project, to be built on a two-acre site at 551 North Fort Lauderdale Beach Boulevard, would include 298 units.

The project, considered essential in transforming the beach area into an upper-class tourist destination, was unanimously approved by the Fort Lauderdale commission on February 15, 2005. By that time, the Gold Coast/Merrimac hotel had been gutted to prepare for the new project. Construction was initially scheduled to begin in April 2005, with completion scheduled for 2007. Construction began in July 2005. The tower was expected to cost $200 million. Stiles Construction Company was the project's general contractor. A construction worker was killed on June 13, 2006, when steel scaffolding collapsed on him. By that time, the hotel had been scheduled to open in 2008. In December 2006, Corus Bankshares provided a $139 million construction loan to the project. Another construction accident occurred in January 2007, when a flagman for the site had his legs run over by a cement truck.

=== Financial issues and lawsuits ===
In October 2007, Trump expressed confidence in the Trump International project despite putting a second, nearby condo-hotel project on hold due to poor real estate conditions. Trump International was ultimately planned to open in 2009. The project had deposits on 70 percent of its units, but following the poor real estate market, many buyers eventually lost interest in the project or were among those who would eventually file lawsuits against it. Bayrock Group ultimately sold its interest in the project to an Icelandic firm.

In May 2009, investors were informed that they had to complete their unit purchases that month. The developer, known then as SB Hotel Associates LLC, stated that the project would likely remain unfinished if less than half of the units were purchased. Buyers were also informed that because of local zoning rules for condo-hotels, they could not occupy their units unless the entire hotel opened. By that time, various lawsuits had been filed by 30 buyers who wanted refunds on their 20-percent deposits.

The lawsuits alleged misleading advertising, with buyers stating that they were misled into believing that Trump's involvement in the project was fully confirmed. However, sales contracts, which referred to the project as the SB Fort Lauderdale Hotel & Condominium, stated that Trump had the right to end the licensing deal and remove his name from the project. Additionally, it was alleged that the marketing materials suggested Trump was a developer in the project, including a letter to investors in which Trump referred to the project as his "latest development." Other marketing material referred to the project as a "signature Trump development." The lawsuits also alleged breach of contract for the failure to have the project completed by December 2008. By the time of the lawsuits, Trump had told the developers that they could not use his name for the project after they defaulted on the licensing agreement.

Corus Bankshares was struggling as of August 2009. By that time, the building had been furnished but remained unoccupied by tenants, and the project had been financed through $182 million in construction loans. The project eventually defaulted on the $139 million loan before its planned 2009 opening. Corus Construction Venture, led by Starwood Capital Group and later known as ST Residential, ultimately took over the mortgage to the property, and in March 2010 filed for foreclosure against SB Associated LLC for defaulting on the loan. The suit named over 80 buyers who never received their units or a refund on their deposits. The foreclosure was expected to take at least six months before being resolved due to the large number of people involved and because of backed-up foreclosure lawsuits in the courts.

In November 2010, Trump announced that the name licensing agreement had been terminated "a long time ago" and that he was not involved in the foreclosure process, which was expected to take an additional six months because of the large number of involved parties – more than 100 buyers – and the backlogged county courts. Ultimately, 75 buyers had filed lawsuits against the project, after they spent a combined total of $8 million on deposits for units. Some investors were upset to learn in 2012 that Felix Sater, a Bayrock Group employee, was involved in the project despite his financial crimes related to the Mafia. Lawyer Joe Altschul had represented the 75 buyers, and stated that they would not have invested in the project if they had known of Sater's involvement.

A foreclosure auction was scheduled for March 14, 2012, as requested by Corus Construction Venture, which was owed $165.6 million from SB Hotel Associates. Corus Construction Venture purchased the project in the foreclosure auction, after no other bidders attempted a purchase due to the high $165.6 starting price, as well as the number of lawsuits associated with the project. In March 2013, ST Residential offered the entire project for sale in a bulk offer, rather than selling the units individually. It was stated that the project had been "well maintained and is in nearly move-in ready condition." A price was not specified, although experts for ST Residential had expected the project to sell for at least $125 million. By that time, nearly $4 million in liens had been filed against the project by previous buyers.

A lawsuit filed by two buyers was the first to go to trial, in March 2014. The buyers stated that they invested in the project because they believed Trump was the developer, a claim that was refuted by Trump during his testimony. The two buyers sought $250,000 in unreturned deposits. The jury ruled in favor of Trump, whose attorney said he would seek millions of dollars in attorney fees from the buyers. Trump still faced a similar lawsuit consisting of 81 plaintiffs who were suing for the return of the $8 million deposit fees. Attorneys in the initial trial alleged that the judge displayed favoritism toward Trump which altered the jury's decision, but their request for a new trial was denied. Other lawsuits were expected to go to trial later that year, and many of them were settled confidentially.

In June 2015, Trump sued Stillman for breach of contract, alleging that he lost millions of dollars because of the project's failure and because of legal fees. Trump stated that he had previously warned Stillman not to settle lawsuits related to the project unless Trump were released from liability, and alleged that Stillman had settled the lawsuits with escrow funds. Trump also alleged that his reputation was damaged. In March 2016, during Trump's U.S. presidential campaign, Republicans for the American Future Fund aired television advertisements in Florida against Trump for his involvement with Sater, in an attempt to prevent Trump from becoming the party's nominee. The following month, a Florida appeals court ruled that Trump did not misrepresent his role in the project, after the two buyers in the initial lawsuit trial appealed the decision.

=== Conrad Fort Lauderdale ===
CFLB Partnership LLC, which owned the nearby Hilton Fort Lauderdale Beach Resort and was an affiliate of Orchestra Hotels & Resorts, purchased the unfinished Trump project for $115 million in December 2013, with plans to open it as the Conrad Fort Lauderdale Beach Residences. Potential buyers were told that they could move into their units in 2014, but that the property would not be fully operational until the following year. In January 2014, Hilton Worldwide announced an agreement with CFLB to operate the project as part of the hotel chain's Conrad Hotels brand. A $34 million enhancement project began that month. Sales for the units began in March 2014, with the project expected to be fully open in early 2015.

In October 2014, plans were announced to open the project as the Conrad Fort Lauderdale Resort and Residences during the summer of 2015. Orchestra planned to spend $40 million on the building's renovation and completion. The plans would include a 290-unit tower, with the units split between 181 condo-hotel units, and 109 condominiums as part of The Ocean Resort Residences, the name used for the project's full-time residential element. Design changes occurred in late 2014, and Orchestra's budget ultimately increased to $70 million in order to upgrade public areas of the project to help it compete against upcoming projects. The building enhancement included a rebuilt lobby, while a lounge and a gourmet market were among the new additions to the project. In March 2015, a five-story glass-enclosed building known as the Jewel Box was topped off. The building connects the Ocean Resort Residences to the Conrad Fort Lauderdale. The hotel project had been scheduled for completion in fall 2015. In October 2015, it was announced that the project's opening had been delayed until early 2016.

The project received a certificate of occupancy in June 2016, but remained unopened. By August 2016, a $1.4 million construction lien had been filed against the project by its general contractor, Moss & Associates. Approximately 35 percent of the project's units had been sold out, with some purchases closing as early as 2014, but further closings were halted until the lien could be resolved. As of August 2016, the project's opening date was also contingent on Orchestra refinancing its construction loan with a better interest rate, a deal that was expected to close within two weeks. Hilton's management team would then require three to four months to get the hotel ready for its opening.

In January 2017, the un-opened project was sold to the Heafey Group, based in Quebec, Canada. Heafey Group purchased the 232 remaining unsold units at a total cost of $91 million. At that time, an opening date of July 2017 was planned, but it did not occur. A restaurant, Terra Mare, opened at the resort in September 2017. The hotel was scheduled to open that month, but because of Hurricane Irma it had a soft opening on September 29 and an official opening on October 10, 2017 as Conrad Fort Lauderdale Beach. The Atlas bar and lounge opened the followed month. The hotel's grand opening and ribbon-cutting ceremony did not occur until December 19, 2017. It is advertising 290 units consisting of 108 luxury condominium residences and 181 condominium hotel units, which will be managed by Conrad, Hilton Worldwide's luxury brand.

In October 2020, Takato, a Japanese and Korean fusion restaurant, opened in the Conrad's primary restaurant space overlooking Fort Lauderdale Beach. The head chef is Taek "Taka" Lee, a former executive sushi chef at a multitude of restaurants in South Florida.
