= Trump International Hotel & Residence =

Proposed real estate development in Phoenix, Arizona

Coordinates: 33.5094°N 112.0249°W

Trump International Hotel & Residence was a proposed real estate development in Phoenix, Arizona.

== Background ==
In 2004, prominent New York real estate developer Donald Trump proposed a $200 million luxury hotel-condominium development at 26th Street and Camelback Road in the highly upscale Camelback Corridor (near the Arizona Biltmore Hotel and the Biltmore Fashion Park shopping center) of Phoenix.

The Camelback East Village Subcommittee (a subcommittee of the Phoenix City Council) on March 2, by a 3–2 vote, affirmed 56-foot (17 m) height limits for the area, which had existed since the 1990s. City staff had recommended raising that limit to 140 feet (43 m) after Trump announced his proposal. Although Trump and his development partners never officially filed plans, they proposed an 18-story, 190 ft (58 m), 550,000 square feet (51,000 m^{2}), 250 unit luxury condominium hotel.

As of December 21, 2005, the project was cancelled and Trump withdrew his association with the project when the City Council succumbed to intense neighborhood opposition and a looming referendum fight (over 19,000 local residents signed the petition against increasing the height limit, many citing fears of the area developing too rapidly). Other developers such as shopping center owner Westcor were forced to radically change similar proposals as a result.

== See also ==
- Trump International Hotel and Tower
