= Potok (company) =

Russian investment and development company

- Formerly: Mirax Group
- Type: Privately held company
- Founded: December 2011
- Headquarters: Moscow, Russia
- Area served: Russia; Ukraine; France; Cambodia; Malaysia; Montenegro; United States; Switzerland; United Kingdom
- Products: Mixed-use development and construction
- Services: Investment and development
- Owner: Sergei Polonsky

Potok (Rus. Flow) is a Russian investment and development company with the head-office in Moscow. Its activities include mixed-use development, construction, managing and selling of real estate in Moscow and abroad. The projects, which were previously under the control of the Mirax Group corporation, now are being developed by this brand.

== Owners and management ==
Potok was founded on December 1, 2011, by Sergei Polonsky, and this company has inherited all the structures and liabilities of Nazvanie.net (former Mirax Group). As reported earlier, the Mirax Group brand was officially closed on 3 March 2011, at a special press-conference for media representatives, who received the official statement of the Board of Directors of the investment and development company MIRAX GROUP. It stated that all the obligations of the group on completion of the objects would certainly be fulfilled. All public debt сommitments of the group (denominated bonds, CLNs and LPNs), said the statement, would also be honored in full accordance with the terms of restructuring.

On December 1, 2011, Sergei Polonsky officially changed the name of the company to Potok, with all the obligations and structures of Nazvanie.net to be retained by the new company.

The controlling interest of Potok belongs to its founder, chairman of the board of directors, Sergei Polonsky.

In July 2012, the restructuring of the public debt of the Potok company (ex-MIRAX GROUP) was successfully completed. It took the company one and a half years to prepare this deal together with the debt restructuring agent, OAO Alfa-Bank and a working group of creditors. The restructuring included the exchange of the five existing at the time security issues – three ruble bond issues and two English law note issues – for the new issue of notes (LPN2019) with the face value of RUR14.5 billion. As collateral for this transaction, 8 projects and a personal guarantee of the Potok shareholder Sergei Polonsky were used. For investors who cannot own the notes for certain reasons, new ruble bonds worth RUR1 billion were issued.

== Activity ==
Potok operates in the real estate markets of Russia, Ukraine, France, Cambodia, Malaysia, Montenegro, United States, Switzerland and Beetham Tower in United Kingdom. In May 2011, the company's portfolio included several projects with a total area of about ten million sq.m.

Potok is the client and developer of the second-tallest skyscraper in Europe, business complex Federation Tower, in the Moscow International Business Center, or Moscow-City. In May 2011, Sberbank of Russia allowed a credit of $373.6 mln for the completion of the tower construction.

As a result of certain restructuring, a new scheme of project management was implemented, in which the management triad, composed of the CEOs and top managers of the company, shall carry out all the construction works on each project of the company's operational program and, therefore, bear full responsibility for the result.

The structures of Potok also comprise several companies previously engaged in separate and distinct types of business. Among them are Stolitsa-Service (engaged in the management and operation of the commissioned buildings), ex-Mirax-Pharma (research, production, and retail of pharmaceutical products), ex-Mirax-Design (design and fulfillment of interiors), and others.
