= Tamir Sapir =

Georgian born-American businessman

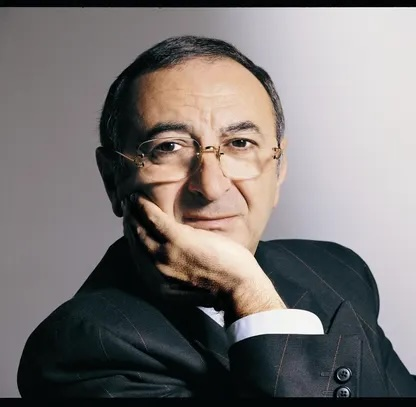
- Sapir in 2010
- Born: Temur Sepiashvili; 1946 or 1947; Tbilisi, Georgian SSR, USSR
- Died: September 24, 2014 (aged 66–67)
- Spouse(s): Bella Sapir (divorced) Elena Ponomareva
- Children: 5

Tamir Sapir (born Temur Sepiashvili, Georgian: თემურ სეფიაშვილი; 1946/1947 – September 24, 2014) was a Georgian-born, Georgian-American businessman, real estate developer and investor. He was the founder of the Sapir Organization, a real estate investment firm based in New York City. Sapir originally made his fortune trading oil and fertilizers with the Soviet Union during the 1980s. He became a billionaire in 2002, with his wealth peaking in 2007 at US$2 billion, according to Forbes.

== Early life and education ==
Temur Sepiashvili was born to a Jewish family in Tbilisi, Georgia. His father was a major in the Soviet Army. In the early 1970s he studied journalism at Tbilisi State University but left to earn money to support his family because of his father's death.

== Career ==
He took a job processing emigration applications for Soviet Jews and in 1973, he immigrated to Israel with his wife around the time of the Yom Kippur War. He changed his last name to Sapir while in Israel and moved to the United States, first to Louisville, Kentucky, where he learned English and worked as a bus driver, janitor, and a loader, and then to New York City where he worked as a taxicab driver, borrowing money for his medallion. He then opened an electronics store with fellow immigrant Sam Kislin, Joy Lud International Distributors on Fifth Avenue, catering primarily to familiar clientele. Joy-Lud became one of the most successful television wholesalers in the entirety of New York City, with then-hotelier Donald Trump awarding them the contract for guestroom TVs for his first three hotels.

Sapir made contacts with the Soviet contingent to the United Nations in New York, and started trading electronics, clothing, and footwear for exclusive rights to sell Soviet oil and oil products which he then sold to American companies. Investing the profits in Manhattan real estate in the 1990s, which was then in a slump, he became a billionaire by 2002. Sapir has been referred to as America's "billionaire cabbie".

Sapir brought a lawsuit in Russia against a Moscow oil refinery after it violated the terms of a contract by failing to transfer oil products for delivered equipment. Sapir won the case in 2005, but received none of the $28 million the Moscow company was ordered to pay.

Sapir was a financier and development partner for the construction of the Trump SoHo in Manhattan in 2006.

== Sapir Organization ==
In 2006, Sapir named his son Alex the chairman and president of the Sapir Organization.

== Personal life ==
Sapir was married twice. His first marriage to Bella Sapir ended in divorce. He had five children: Ruth Sapir Barinstein (born 1973), Zina (born 1974), Alex (born 1980), Zita, and Eli. His second wife was Elena Ponomareva. He also had 6 grandchildren: Ariana Barinstein, Gabriel Barinstein, David Rosen, Raquel Rosen, Sebastian and Timur Sapir. He was a member of the Park East Synagogue in Manhattan. He built the Congregation of Georgian Jews synagogue in Rego Park, Queens. He died on September 26, 2014, aged 67.

Sapir's daughter, Zina, and Rotem Rosen, the CEO of Africa Israel USA and close to Lev Leviev of Africa Israel Investments, were married on December 20, 2007, at Mar-a-Lago with the Pussycat Dolls and Lionel Richie performing. Donald Trump and Jared Kushner, friends of the couple, were invited to the June 1, 2008 bris of their infant son. Rotem Rosen was pivotal to Lev Leviev's April 2007 purchase of the Times Building on West 43rd Street for $525 million.

Sapir's three-mansion estate, The Fountains, was an expanded version of a 1928 mansion. It is located at 26 Pond Road, Great Neck, New York. It is currently for sale at an asking price of $55 million.
