= Turks in Uzbekistan =

Turkish people in Uzbekistan

Total population
- 15,000-38,000 plus 700 Turkish nationals

Regions with significant populations
- Bukhara; Ferghana; Jizzakh; Kashkadarya; Nawoiy; Samarkand; Sirdarya; Tashkent

Languages
- Turkish, Uzbek

Religion
- Islam

Turks in Uzbekistan (Turkish: Özbekistan'daki Türkler) are ethnic Turks who live in Uzbekistan.

== History ==
=== Ottoman migration ===
The First All-Union Census of the Soviet Union in 1926 recorded that 8,570 Turkish people lived in the Soviet Union. Those of Turkish descent are no longer listed separately in the census, it is presumed that those who were living in Uzbekistan have either been assimilated into Uzbek society or have left the country.

=== Meskhetian Turks migration ===
Turks in Uzbekistan according to Soviet Censuses
Year	Population
1939	474
1959	21,269
1970	46,398
1979	48,726
1989	106,302

During World War II, the Soviet Union was preparing to launch a pressure campaign against Turkey. Vyacheslav Molotov, who was at the time the Minister of Foreign Affairs, requested to the Turkish Ambassador in Moscow that Turkey surrender of three Anatolian provinces (Kars, Ardahan and Artvin). Thus, war against Turkey seemed possible, and Joseph Stalin wanted to clear the strategic Turkish population situated in Meskheti, near the Turkish-Georgian border, since during the Russo-Turkish Wars the Turks of the region had been loyal to the Ottoman Empire and were therefore likely to be hostile to Soviet intentions. In 1944, the Meskhetian Turks were deported after being accused of smuggling, banditry and espionage in collaboration with their kin across the Turkish border. Nationalistic policies at the time encouraged the slogan: "Georgia for Georgians" and that the Meskhetian Turks should be sent to Turkey "where they belong". They were deported mainly to Uzbekistan, thousands dying en route in cattle-trucks, and were not permitted by the Georgian government of Zviad Gamsakhurdia to return to their homeland.

In the last Soviet Census, which was conducted in 1989, there were 207,500 Meskhetian Turks in the Soviet Union and over 51.2% were registered in Uzbekistan. The majority of the Meskhetian Turks settled in the Ferghana Valley, where many of them became financially better off than the Uzbeks. However, in 1989, their prosperity led to xenophobia directed against them, and ethnic intolerance eventually developed into anti-Meskhetian Turk rioting in the valley. The incidents killed over 100 people, injured over 1,000 and destroyed over 700 homes. In its aftermath, there were indications of plots by nationalist Uzbeks to continue their carnage; the Soviet authorities issued an official ruling that 17,000 Meskhetian Turks, virtually the entire Turkish population in the Fergana Valley, be transported to Russia. Another 70,000 Meskhetian Turks from other parts of Uzbekistan soon followed the first wave of migrants and settled mainly in Azerbaijan and Russia. However, Turks who wish to return to Georgia are required to change their names from Turkish to Georgian, the vast majority of the Meskhetian Turks have rejected these conditions.

== Demographics ==
Uzbekistan has not conducted a census since 1989, therefore there are no official statistics regarding the current Turkish population in Uzbekistan. International organizations have given rough averages. It is believed that approximately between 15,000 and 20,000 Turks live in Tashkent, Jizzakh, Sirdaryo Region, Qashqadaryo Region. Furthermore, there are 3,000 Turks in Bukhara, 4,000 in Samarkand and 2,000 in Nawoiy.

== Issues in Uzbekistan ==
Unlike in neighboring Turkmenistan and Kazakhstan, Turks living in Uzbekistan have faced unfortunate circumstances. Clashes with the Uzbeks in the 1989 riots in Tashkent resulted in over 1,500 casualties. A lack of provisions for the Turkish community continues to prevail, with no Turkish schools or language instruction having been established. Highly Russian and Armenian presentations in this country have also led to erasure of the Turkish peoples. Russians, Armenians, and some Belarusians have openly opposed the idea of an open Turkish community due to historical fear and tension between the Armenians and Turks. Continuing problems have led to a decline in the Turkish population of Uzbekistan.

== Notable people ==
- Isgender Aznaurov, Uzbek-born National Hero of Azerbaijan who fought in the First Nagorno-Karabakh War (Turkish Meskhetian origin)
- Bahram Muzaffer, amateur boxer (Turkish Meskhetian origin)
- Takhir Kapadze, football coach (Turkish Meskhetian origin)
- Timur Kapadze, football player and manager of the Uzbekistan national football team (Turkish Meskhetian origin)
- Mikail Suleymanov, Uzbek actor, copywriter and film director (Turkish Meskhetian origin)
- Malik Mukhlis Ugli, educator (Turkish Meskhetian origin)

== See also ==
- Turkey–Uzbekistan relations
- Population transfer in the Soviet Union
- Demographics of Uzbekistan
- Turkish diaspora
- Turks in the former Soviet Union
- Turkic Council
- Uzbeks in Turkey

== Bibliography ==
- Akiner, Shirin (1983), Islamic Peoples of the Soviet Union, Taylor & Francis, ISBN 0-7103-0025-5.
- Atabaki, Touraj; Mehendale, Sanjyot (2005), Central Asia and the Caucasus: Transnationalism and Diaspora, Routledge, ISBN 0-415-33260-5.
- Aydıngün, Ayşegül (2002), "Ahiska (Meskhetian) Turks: Source of Conflict in the Caucasus?", The International Journal of Human Rights, 6 (2): 49–64, doi:10.1080/714003762
- Aydıngün, Ayşegül; Harding, Çigğdem Balım; Hoover, Matthew; Kuznetsov, Igor; Swerdlow, Steve (2006), Meskhetian Turks: An Introduction to their History, Culture, and Resettelment Experiences (PDF), Center for Applied Linguistics, archived from the original (PDF) on 2007-07-14
- Babak, Vladimir; Vaisman, Demian; Wasserman, Aryeh (2004), Political Organization in Central Asia and Azerbaijan: Sources and Documents, Routledge, ISBN 0-7146-4838-8.
- Bennigsen, Alexandre; Broxup, Marie (1983), The Islamic Threat to the Soviet State, Taylor & Francis, ISBN 0-7099-0619-6.
- Blacklock, Denika (2005), Finding Durable Solutions for the Meskhetians (PDF), European Centre for Minority Issues, archived from the original (PDF) on 2010-06-02
- Cornell, Svante E. (2001), Small nations and great powers: a study of ethnopolitical conflict in the Caucasus, Routledge, ISBN 0-7007-1162-7.
- Council of Europe (2006), Documents: working papers, 2005 ordinary session (second part), 25-29 April 2005, Vol. 3: Documents 10407, 10449-10533, Council of Europe, ISBN 92-871-5754-5.
- Council of Europe (2007), Parliamentary Assembly: Working Papers 2007 Ordinary Session 22-26 January 2007, Council of Europe, ISBN 978-92-871-6191-8.
- Drobizheva, Leokadia; Gottemoeller, Rose; Kelleher, Catherine McArdle (1998), Ethnic Conflict in the Post-Soviet World: Case Studies and Analysis, M.E. Sharpe, ISBN 1-56324-741-0.
- Khazanov, Anatoly Michailovich (1995), After the USSR: Ethnicity, Nationalism and Politics in the Commonwealth of Independent States, University of Wisconsin Press, ISBN 0-299-14894-7.
- Kurbanov, Rafik Osman-Ogly; Kurbanov, Erjan Rafik-Ogly (1995), "Religion and Politics in the Caucasus", in Bourdeaux, Michael (ed.), The Politics of Religion in Russia and the New States of Eurasia, M.E. Sharpe, ISBN 1-56324-357-1.
- Minahan, James (1998), Miniature Empires: A Historical Dictionary of the Newly Independent States, Greenwood Publishing Group, ISBN 0-313-30610-9.
- Pohl, J. Otto (1999), Ethnic Cleansing in the USSR, 1937-1949, Greenwood Publishing Group, ISBN 0-313-30921-3.
- Polian, Pavel (2004), Against Their Will: The History and Geography of Forced Migrations in the USSR, Central European University Press, ISBN 963-9241-68-7.
- Peimani, Hooman (2009), Conflict and Security in Central Asia and the Caucasus, ABC-CLIO, ISBN 978-1-59884-054-4.
- Ryazantsev, Sergey V. (2009), "Turkish Communities in the Russian Federation" (PDF), International Journal on Multicultural Societies, 11 (2): 155–173
- Schnabel, Albrecht; Carment, David (2004), Conflict Prevention from Rhetoric to Reality, Volume 1, Lexington Books, ISBN 0-7391-0738-0.
- Tomlinson, Kathryn (2005), "Living Yesterday in Today and Tomorrow: Meskhetian Turks in Southern Russia", in Crossley, James G.; Karner, Christian (eds.), Writing History, Constructing Religion, Ashgate Publishing, ISBN 0-7546-5183-5.
