= Soviet Union–Turkey relations =

- Turkey: Soviet Union

Diplomatic mission
- Embassy of Turkey, Moscow: Embassy of the Soviet Union, Ankara

Soviet Union–Turkey relations were the diplomatic relations between the Soviet Union and the Republic of Turkey.

== History ==
The Soviet Union and the new Turkish governments were outsiders to the great powers and gravitated toward each other after World War I. According to Onur Işçi:

Beginning in 1920, bitterness against the postwar international order drove Soviet-Turkish relations. Nationalist Turks and internationalist Bolsheviks laid to rest four centuries of rivalry between their imperial predecessors as they found themselves in a convergence that each side defined as anti-imperialist. At the heart of their cooperation was a geopolitical alignment that sought to shield the greater Black Sea region from Western intrusions. .... All the way up to the final hours of peace in 1939, the first principle that guided Turkish diplomacy was good neighborly relations with Moscow in the context of friendship rather than subordination.

The Ottoman government signed the Treaty of Brest-Litovsk between the Bolshevik government of Russia and the Central Powers on March 3, 1918, but it became obsolete later that year. Russian Bolsheviks and the Soviet government were led by Vladimir Lenin, who emerged victorious from the Russian Civil War by 1921 and viewed the Turkish revolutionary (national) movement under the leadership of Mustafa Kemal as congenial to their ideological and geopolitical aspirations. Lenin's government abdicated the traditional claims of the Russian Empire to the territories of Western Armenia and the Turkish Straits.

=== Bolshevik support for Turkish nationalists ===
The Russian Soviet Federative Socialist Republic was the first state that formally recognised the Kemalist government of Turkey in March 1921 after the Republic of Armenia which signed the Treaty of Alexandropol with the Turkish revolutionaries on 2 December 1920. The Treaty of Moscow, signed on 16 March 1921 between Lenin's government and the Grand National Assembly of Turkey government (although the Sultanate was still nominally in existence), followed bilateral treaties that the Moscow government concluded with Persia and Afghanistan earlier that year (apart from those with the states on the territory of the former Russian Empire).

Under the 1921 Treaty of Moscow, the two governments undertook to establish friendly relations between the countries. Under Article II, Turkey ceded Batum and the adjacent area north of the village of Sarp to Soviet Georgia (Kars Oblast went to Turkey). Article III instituted an autonomous Nakhchivan oblast under Soviet Azerbaijan's protectorate. Article V had the parties agree to delegate the final elaboration of the status of the Black Sea and the Turkish Straits to a future conference of delegates of the littoral states if the "full sovereignty" and security of Turkey and "her capital city of Constantinople" were not injured. The Treaty of Moscow was followed by an identical Treaty of Kars signed in October 1921 by the Kemalists with Soviet Armenia, Soviet Azerbaijan and Soviet Georgia, which formed part of the Soviet Union after the December 1922 Treaty on the Creation of the Soviet Union.

The Soviet supply of gold and armaments to the Kemalists in 1920 to 1922 was a key factor in the latter's successful takeover of the Ottoman Empire, which had been defeated by the Triple Entente but won the Armenian campaign (1920) and the Greco-Turkish War (1919–1922).

Before the Amasya Circular, Mustafa Kemal met with a Bolshevik delegation headed by Colonel Semyon Budyonny. The Bolsheviks wanted to annex parts of the Caucasus, including the Democratic Republic of Armenia, which were formerly part of Tsarist Russia. They also saw a Turkish Republic as a buffer state or possibly a communist ally. Mustafa Kemal's declined to consider adopting communism until after an independent national was established. Having Bolshevik support was important for the national movement.

The first objective was the securing of arms from abroad. They obtained these primarily from Soviet Russia, Italy and France. These arms—especially the Soviet weapons—allowed the Turks to organise an effective army. The Treaties of Moscow and Kars (1921) arranged the border between Turkey and the Soviet-controlled Transcaucasian republics, while Russia itself was in a state of civil war in the period just before the establishment of the Soviet Union. In particular, Nakhchivan and Batumi were ceded to the future USSR. In return, the nationalists received support and gold. For the promised resources, the nationalists had to wait until the Battle of Sakarya (August–September 1921).

By providing financial and war materiel aid, the Bolsheviks, under Vladimir Lenin aimed to heat up the conflict between the Allies and the Turkish nationalists in order to prevent the participation of more Allied troops in the Russian Civil War. At the same time, the Bolsheviks attempted to export communist ideologies to Anatolia and supported individuals (for example: Mustafa Suphi and Ethem Nejat) who were pro-communism.

According to Soviet documents, Soviet financial and war material support between 1920 and 1922 amounted to: 39,000 rifles, 327 machine guns, 54 cannon, 63 million rifle bullets, 147,000 shells, 2 patrol boats, 200.6 kg of gold ingots and 10.7 million Turkish lira (which accounted for a twentieth of the Turkish budget during the war). Additionally the Soviets gave the Turkish nationalists 100,000 gold rubles to help build an orphanage and 20,000 lira to obtain printing house equipment and cinema equipment.

In the 4th World Congress of the Communist International, in November–December 1922 and just a month after the Kemalist victory against Greece, the Soviets commented retrospectively to the Conferences of London and noted that "the Ankara government is a treasonous government".

=== Events between the world wars ===
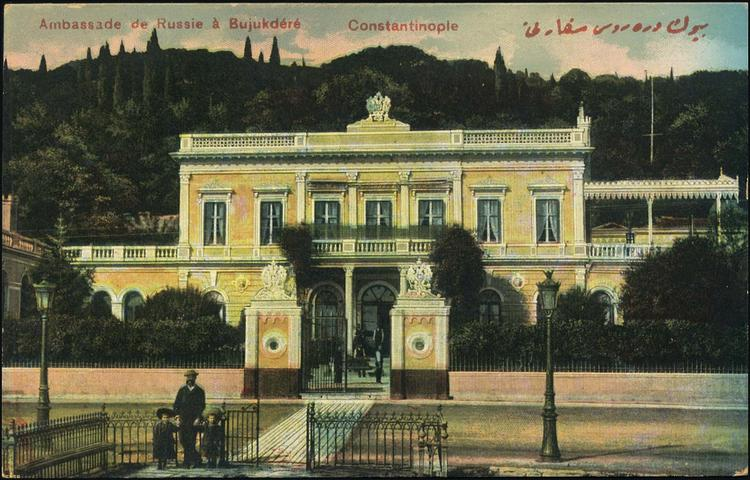
Russian Embassy in Istanbul. Ottoman postcard

On 16 December 1925, the Turkish government withdrew its delegation, which let the League of Nations Council grant a mandate for the disputed region of Mosul to Britain without its consent. Kemal countered the diplomatic reverse by concluding a non-aggression pact with the Soviet Union on 17 December. The pact was later amended and prolonged and then was prolonged again for another ten years on November 7, 1935. The key episode was agreement on the Montreux Convention in July 1936 in which Turkey regained control over the Straits, which it was allowed to remilitarise.

In parallel to the fluctuating bilateral relations, the communist leaders, party functionaries, diplomats and scholars paid close attention to the origins, evolution and transformational phases of Kemalism.

=== Growing tensions after 1939 ===
Turkey officially remained neutral during the Second World War until 23 February 1945, but the Soviet Union viewed Turkey's continued relationship with Nazi Germany, whose warships were allowed passage through the Straits, as inimical to itself.

On 19 March 1945, Soviet Foreign Minister Vyacheslav Molotov advised Turkey's ambassador in Moscow that the Soviet Union was unilaterally withdrawing from the 1925 Non-Aggression Pact. When the Turkish government enquired on what conditions a new agreement could be concluded, it was informed by Molotov that in addition to bases in the Straits, the Soviets claimed part of eastern Turkey, which was assumed to refer to the districts of Kars, Artvin and Ardahan, which the Russian Empire and the short-lived DRA had held between 1878 and 1921.

=== Turkey joins NATO ===
At the Potsdam Conference (July 1945), Stalin demanded a revision of the Montreux Convention. The British and the Americans agreed with the Soviet demand for the Straits always to be open to the warships of the Black Sea powers and, in principle, remain closed to those of outside powers. However, the Soviets also demanded to be allowed to join the defence of the Straits, which was rejected by Turkey, which was backed by the West.

In March 1947, with the proclamation of the Truman Doctrine, the Americans underwrote the frontiers of Turkey and Greece and the continued existence of non-communist governments in both countries.

The Turks sought aid from the Americans and joined NATO in 1952. The Soviets and the Turks were in different camps during the Korean War and throughout the Cold War. In effect the Truman doctrine and NATO contained the Soviets expansion to the South.

== Relations between post–Soviet states and Turkey ==
- Armenia
- Azerbaijan
- Belarus
- Estonia
- (Georgia (country)) Georgia
- Kazakhstan
- Kyrgyzstan
- Latvia
- Lithuania
- Moldova
- Russia
- Tajikistan
- Turkmenistan
- Ukraine
- Uzbekistan

== See also ==
- Foreign relations of the Soviet Union
- Foreign relations of Turkey
- Armenia–Turkey relations
- Azerbaijan–Turkey relations
- Russia–Turkey relations
- Turks in the former Soviet Union
- Turkish–Azeri blockade of Armenia
