= Turks in the former Soviet Union =

Turks in the former Soviet Union were a relatively small minority within the Soviet Union when excluding Turks of Azerbaijan, Oguz Turks and other Turkish groups. However, their presence is considered important within Turkology due to the deportation of thousands of Turks from their home countries. Under the Ottoman Empire, Samtskhe-Javakheti was heavily Islamised producing a Turkish ethnicity within the southwestern region of Georgia. In November 1944, up to 120,000 of these Turks were deported to Central Asia under the rule of Joseph Stalin.

== History ==
Turks in the former Soviet Union have a long history beginning in the Ottoman Empire when the Turks began to migrate to the Ottoman territories which created Turkish communities in Georgia and Ukraine. However, large migration of Turks to other post-Soviet states was in 1944 when the Meskhetian and Chepni Turks were suppressed by Joseph Stalin and deported to Central Asia. The Turkish community were originally native to the Georgian-Turkish border area and forcibly displaced to Central Asia on November 15, 1944. The majority of Turks settled in Uzbekistan, however, in 1989, anti-Meskhetian riots broke out due to their superior living standards and economic well-being in an area heavily struck by unemployment. Thus, over 90,000 Turks resettled from Uzbekistan to other parts of the Soviet Union. Some of the Turks relocated in and around Nagorno-Karabakh. However, when the Armenians took control of the area, they were once again forced to flee. Although some have returned to Georgia, a problem however has constantly been that Georgians and Armenians who resettled into the homes of the Turks have vowed to take up arms against any return movements. Moreover, many Georgians have advocated that the Meskhetian Turks should be sent to Turkey, 'where they belong'.

Effects of the deportation of Turks during Soviet rule
1939 census	Number of deaths during the first 5 years of exile	In exile by January, 1953	1989 census
115,000	15,000	49,000	208,000

=== Ethnic cleansing ===
Within the Soviet Union, ethnic cleansing of Turks during World War II took the form of mass deportations carried out by the Soviet secret police and the Red Army. The reason for the deportation was because the Soviet Union was preparing to launch a pressure campaign against Turkey. In June 1945 Vyacheslav Molotov, then Minister of Foreign Affairs, formally presented a demand to the Turkish Ambassador in Moscow for the surrender of three Anatolian provinces (Kars, Ardahan and Artvin). Moscow was also preparing to support Armenian claims to several other Anatolian provinces. Thus, war against Turkey seemed possible, and Joseph Stalin wanted to clear the strategic Turkish population (especially those situated in Meskheti) located near the Turkish-Georgian border which were likely to be hostile to Soviet intentions. The deportation is relatively poorly documented, but Soviet sources suggests that an estimated 115,000 Turks were deported mainly to Central Asia, most of which settled in Uzbekistan.

In 1989, ethnic clashes between the Uzbeks and Turks occurred. According to official figures, 103 people died and over 1,000 were wounded. Moreover, 700 houses were destroyed and more than 60,000 Meskhetian Turks were driven out of Uzbekistan. The events of 1989 are considered by the Turks as their second deportation. Those that remained in Uzbekistan complained (in private due to the fear of repercussions) of ethnic discrimination.

== Demographics ==
Although the last Soviet census recorded a figure of 207,512 Turks, this may have not counted all ethnic Turks, because for many years, Turks were denied the right to register their ethnicity in legal documents. For example, in Kazakhstan only a third of them were recorded as Turks on their passports. The rest had been arbitrarily declared members of other ethnic groups.

Country	1897 Census	1939 Census	1970 Census	1979 Census	1989 Census	Current estimates	Further information
Armenia			19	28	13		
Azerbaijan			8,491	7,926	17,705	38,000	Turks in Azerbaijan
Belarus			9	17	55		
Estonia			23	22	23		
Georgia			853	917	1,375	1,000	Turks in Georgia
Kazakhstan			18,397	25,820	49,567	110,000	Turks in Kazakhstan
Kyrgyzstan			3,076	5,160	21,294	42,000-70,000	Turks in Kyrgyzstan
Latvia			12	3	9		
Lithuania			5	30	8		
Moldova			26	20	14		
Russia			1,568	3,561	9,890	105,000	Turks in Russia
Tajikistan			39	53	768		
Turkmenistan			347	149	227		Turks in Turkmenistan
Ukraine			226	257	262	10,000	Turks in Ukraine
Uzbekistan			46,398	48,726	106,302	15,000-20,000	Turks in Uzbekistan
Total	208,822	115,000	79,489	92,689	207,512	386,000 to 451,000	

== Notable people ==
- Ulus Baker
- Hüseyin Özkan

== See also ==
- Soviet Union–Turkey relations
- Demographics of the Soviet Union
- Human rights in the Soviet Union
- Population transfer in the Soviet Union
- Russification
- Turks in Europe

== Bibliography ==
- Aydıngün, Ayşegül; Harding, Çigğdem Balım; Hoover, Matthew; Kuznetsov, Igor; Swerdlow, Steve (2006), "Meskhetian Turks: An Introduction to their History, Culture, and Resettelment Experiences" (PDF), www.cal.org, Center for Applied Linguistics, archived from the original (PDF) on 2007-07-14
- Babak, Vladimir; Vaisman, Demian; Wasserman, Aryeh (2004), Political Organization in Central Asia and Azerbaijan: Sources and Documents, Routledge, ISBN 0-7146-4838-8.
- Bennigsen, Alexandre; Broxup, Marie (1983), The Islamic threat to the Soviet state, Taylor & Francis, ISBN 0-7099-0619-6.
- Blacklock, Denika (2005), "FINDING DURABLE SOLUTIONS FOR THE MESKHETIANS" (PDF), www.ecmi.de, EUROPEAN CENTRE FOR MINORITY ISSUES, archived from the original (PDF) on 2010-06-02
- Cohen, Roberta; Deng, Francis Mading (1998), The Forsaken People: Case Studies of the Internally Displaced, Brookings Institution Press, ISBN 0-8157-1514-5.
- Cornell, Svante E. (2001), Small nations and great powers: a study of ethnopolitical conflict in the Caucasus, Routledge, ISBN 0-7007-1162-7.
- Donaldson, Robert H. (1981), The Soviet Union in the Third World: Successes and Failures, Taylor & Francis, ISBN 0-89158-974-0.
- Drobizheva, Leokadia; Gottemoeller, Rose; Kelleher, Catherine McArdle (1998), Ethnic Conflict in the Post-Soviet World: Case Studies and Analysis, M.E. Sharpe, ISBN 1-56324-741-0.
- Khazanov, Anatoly Michailovich (1995), After the USSR: ethnicity, nationalism and politics in the Commonwealth of Independent States, University of Wisconsin Press, ISBN 0-299-14894-7.
- Rywkin, Michael (1994), Moscow's Lost Empire, M.E. Sharpe, ISBN 1-56324-237-0.
- Schnabel, Albrecht; Carment, David (2004), Conflict prevention from rhetoric to reality, Volume 1, Lexington Books, ISBN 0-7391-0738-0.
- Ther, Philipp; Siljak, Ana (2001), Redrawing nations: ethnic cleansing in East-Central Europe, 1944-1948, Rowman & Littlefield, ISBN 0-7425-1094-8.
