= Uzbeks in Turkey =

Ethnic group in Turkey

Turkiyadagi O'zbeklar (Uzbek)
- Flag of Uzbekistan, used by the diaspora in Turkey since 1991

Total population
- ~70,000

Languages
- Turkish, Uzbek, Southern Uzbek, Uyghur, Tajik

Religion
- Sunni Islam; Shia Islam (minority)

Related ethnic groups
- other Uzbek diaspora communities

Uzbeks in Turkey (Turkish: Türkiye'deki Özbekler, Türkiye'deki Özbek Türkler, Uzbek: Туркиядаги Ўзбеклар, Turkiyadagi O‘zbeklar) - one of the ethnic groups of the country. Like the Turks, Uzbeks are Turkic-speaking and also profess Islam. The number of the Uzbek diaspora in Turkey is approximately 70,000 people, Uzbeks live in almost all regions and large cities of the country.

== History ==
The first Turks of Central Asia arrived in Asia Minor, that is, on the territory of present-day Turkey, a thousand years ago, in the middle of the 11th century, together with the migration of various Turkic tribes. There are nine villages in modern Turkey called Uzbek: in the Central region of the Çanakkale region, in the northwest of the country, near the Dardanelles Strait; in the Shabanoz district of the Çankırı region in the north; in the Kulp district of the Diyarbakir region in the southeast; in the Central District of Erzurum Province in the east; in the Urla district of the İzmir Province in the west; in the Elbistan and Turkoglun districts of the Kahramanmarash region in the southeast; in the Pamukovinsky district of the Sakarya region in the northwest; in the Idil district of the Şırnak region in the southeast. On the fourth kilometer of the Urla-Cesme highway, there is a small tekke settlement Samut Baba, which was built during the Seljuk period by one of the Turkic Alperens who arrived from Central Asia (Alperens are called nineteen thousand students of the famous thinker Ahmad Yasawi, whom he taught to live the Islamic canons. Yasawi sent Alperens to Anatolia to spread the Sufi teachings among the local population. The age of the tekke is about nine hundred years.

== Gallery ==
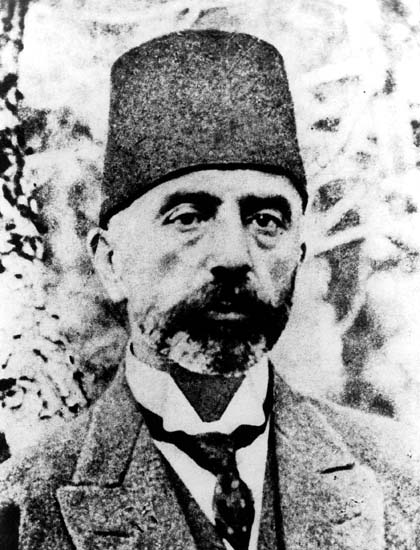
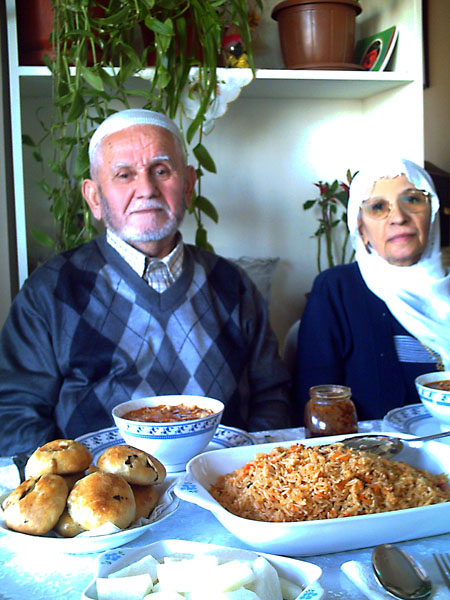
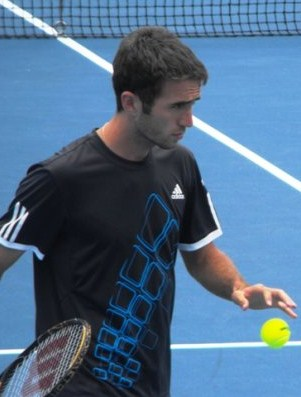
Mehmet Akif Ersoy- Ottoman poet (author of the words of the Turkish anthem), religious educator (translator of the Koran), deputy, of mixed Albanian-Uzbek origin.	Representatives of the Uzbek diaspora in Turkey at the festive table.	Marsel İlhan — professional tennis player, of Uzbek origin, became the first Turkish athlete to reach the 2nd round in the tournament Grand Slam

== See also ==
- Turkey–Uzbekistan relations
- Demographics of Turkey
- Uzbeks
- Turks in Uzbekistan
