= Turks in Turkmenistan =

Total population
- 13,000 (2012 census)

Languages
- Turkish, Turkmen

Religion
- Islam

Related ethnic groups
- Turkic peoples

Turks in Turkmenistan (Turkish: Türkmenistan'daki Türkler) are either Turkish people who live in Turkmenistan even though having been born outside Turkmenistan, or are Turkmenistan-born people with Turkish roots. By Turkish roots, this could mean roots linking back to Turkey, or in neighbouring countries once part of the Ottoman Empire that still have a population whose language is Turkish or who claims a Turkish identity or cultural heritage.

== Population ==
According to the 2012 Turkmen census, there was 13,000 Turks living in Turkmenistan. The largest number of Turks were recorded in the capital city of Ashgabat where they numbered 10,500.

== Turkish schools ==
Due to the common ethnic, linguistic, religious, cultural and historical ties of Turkish and Turkmen people, the Turkish community in Turkmenistan are well integrated. In Turkmenistan there is 1 high school, 1 primary school, 1 Turkish Language Training Centre and 1 Vocational Training Centre that operates in Ashgabat under the Turkish National Education Ministry.

== See also ==
- Turkey–Turkmenistan relations
- Demographics of Turkmenistan
- Turks in the former Soviet Union
