= 1989 Fergana pogroms =

1989 massacre in Uzbekistan

Coordinates: 40°54′03″N 71°45′28″E

Fergana Massacre
- Part of the exile of the Meskhetian Turks and the dissolution of the Soviet Union
- Location: Fergana Valley, Uzbek SSR
- Date: 3 June 1989–12 June 1989 (1 week and 2 days)
- Target: Meskhetian Turks
- Attack type: pogrom
- Deaths: over 100 (Note: Estimates of the death toll vary: Historian Yegor Gaidar indicated there were 103 deaths, The Economist reports a death toll of 112, while historians Bradley Mayhew, Simon Richmond, Richard Plunkett indicate that the death toll was at least 150.)
- Injuries: over 1,000
- Perpetrator: Uzbek nationalist mobs (Note: Allegations remain that representatives of other nationalities wearing Uzbek garb were involved in the attacks.)
- Accused: KGB-led mafia

The Fergana pogroms happened in 1989, after riots broke out between the Meskhetian Turks exiled in Uzbekistan and the native Uzbeks. Hundreds of Meskhetian Turks were killed or injured, around 1,000 properties were destroyed, and tens of thousands of Meskhetian Turks fled to other Soviet republics.

Over 100 people were killed in the pogroms, and over 1,000 were wounded and 752 houses destroyed. The pogrom has been described as "one of the worst rounds of ethnic violence in the former Soviet Union" and received considerable international attention.

It is not to be confused with the pogrom in 1990 that targeted Jews and Armenians.

== Background ==
In 1944, the Meskhetian Turks were deported by the Soviet regime from the Georgian SSR to Central Asia, mainly to the Uzbek SSR. Unlike most other minorities deported in the Stalin era, they were not allowed to return to their homeland. By the time of the start of the pogroms, before the massacre, about 100,000 Meskhetian Turks lived in Uzbek SSR. While the Meskhetian Turks peititioned the government to allow them to return to their homeland, or at least somewhere in the Georgian SSR, they were unable to. The Uzbek SSR enjoyed an extremely high level of autonomy compared to the rest of the Soviet Union, and while nationalism among smaller ethnic groups was discouraged, Uzbek nationalism grew in power, especially under the Sharof Rashidov administration. Uzbek nationalist sentiments grew in response to the prosecutions of people involved in the cotton scandal. Ethnic tensions existed long before the start of the pogrom, but became more pronounced during glasnost. For example, on 4 December 1988, there was a rally in the Uzbek SSR where people displayed banners with slogans disparaging other ethnicities, calling on Russians to return to Russia and for Crimean Tatars to return to Crimea, and in February 1989 a group of around 100 people were thwarted in an attempt to launch a pogrom.

The Uzbek mobs that took part in the pogrom focused on Meskhetian Turks (and to a lesser extent, Crimean Tatars) for several reasons: Russians enjoyed the protection of Moscow and attacking them would result in significantly more backlash, the Korean community was very organized and had accumulated guns for self-defense in the event that they were targeted for a pogrom, and Crimean Tatar-Uzbek relations were slightly better than Meskhetian Turk-Uzbek relations. Widespread resentment of Meskhetian Turks developed due to the perception that they had a higher standard of living than Uzbeks.

== Attacks ==
The attacks on Meskhetian Turks took place from mid May to early June 1989 across numerous parts of the Fergana Valley. The riots started with a brawl in Quvasoy and spread across the valley, with most of the violence taking place in the cities of Fergana, Margilon, and Toshloq. Later violence spread to other cities such as Kokand.

=== Early attacks in Quvasoy ===
From May 16 to 18, 1989, small-scale fighting took place between Meskhetian Turk and Uzbek youth in Quvasoy. (Note: Often spelled as Kuvasay and occasionally as Kuvasi. Misspelled by the New York Times as Kubasai.) By May 23, the fighting in Quvasoy resumed and proceeded to escalate over the next two days the fighting resumed and escalated into major clashes that lasted two days. Hundreds of Meskhetian Turks and Uzbek were involved in the fights. After a crowd of Uzbeks tried to attack a majority-minority neighborhood and launch a pogrom, the authorities forced them to disperse. Around 300 police officers from other regions were summoned to help stop the pogrom. Over the course of the wave of violence, 58 people were injured, 32 of which required hospitalization. One police officer, Ikrom Abdurakhmanov, died in the hospital from his injuries. Rumors spread that Meskhetian Turks were attacking Uzbek women and children, invigorating mobs to continue attacks.

After the attacks, local authorities organized an emergency meeting to discuss how to contain the violence.

=== Toshloq ===
The next wave of the pogrom began on June 3. That morning, in what has been described as the most aggressive attack, a crowd of young Uzbeks attacked Meskhetian Turks and set fire to their houses in the town of Toshloq. (Note: Often spelled as Tashlak.) The first murders took place in this village. That day, 56 people were killed, 43 of whom were Meskhetian Turks.

The next morning, the Meskhetian Turks in Toshloq were gathered on buses and given rides to the building that housed the district party committee to shelter there. Rioters began attacking the building where the Meskhetian Turks were sheltered and held the building under siege for over four hours, injuring 15 police officers who tried to defend the Meskhetian Turks. Eventually both the city party committee building and the local police department were destroyed.

=== Margilan ===
On the morning of June 4, a rally gathered near a movie theater in Margilan. The crowd demanded that the first secretary of the city Communist Party come and listen to their demands. The secretary came and listed to their demands and encouraged them to remain calm, but the crowd insisted that the city hand over all Meskhetian Turks that were sheltering in government buildings and release everyone that had been arrested for attacking Meskhetian Turks. The government refused to hand over the Meskhetian Turks. By the afternoon that same day, the crowd managed to breach the city committee building where Meskhetian Turks had been sheltering. The crowd proceeded to ransack the building. However, the Meskhetian Turks who previously had been sheltering there had been moved to another place by the time the attackers breached the building.

A decree of the Presidium of the Supreme Soviet of the Uzbek SSR was adopted on the introduction of a curfew on June 4 in a number of districts of the Fergana region.

=== Fergana city ===
On June 4 in the city of Fergana, pogromists armed with sticks and metal poles gathered in the city center in the morning, smashing cars and kiosks. The crowd surrounded the building of the regional committee of the Communist Party of Uzbekistan, attempting to break through the cordon and throwing stones. A small group managed to enter the building.

On June 5, spontaneous rallies continued in central Fergana, on Lenin Square and near the Fergana Regional Party Committee building. A crowd managed to break into the building of the Regional Party Committee of Uzbekistan, but the Meskhetian Turks had already been evacuated. Pogroms and arson attacks on houses belonging to Meskhetian Turks continued in the city and surrounding areas. On June 5, youth groups also gathered in Quvasoy, but their attempts to start a clash were thwarted by police. Pogroms in Fergana continued on June 5, but by the end of the day, internal troops and police managed to stop them.

=== Kokand ===
At a Communist Party building in Kokand, a large crowd demanded the release of 400 people arrested for involvement in pogroms and were being held awaiting prosecution. Several people in the crowd were shot.

On June 7, more than 5,000 villagers from nearby districts set off for Kokand in trucks, buses, and tractor trailers. About 1,500 Meskhetian Turks lived there; many of them had attempted to leave the city in the preceding days, but were detained and sent back by police posts set up on the outskirts. A crowd seized a brick factory and the police department building, which was soon recaptured by police. Sixty-eight prisoners were forcibly released from the pretrial detention center (according to other sources, they were released by the authorities at the crowd's demand). Hoping to escape, the Turks hid in a motor pool and a sanatorium, but some were still attacked. The attackers sacked and burned their homes, and the homes of local Uzbeks as well. In several settlements of the Kirovsky district, police stations were seized and service weapons were stolen.

On the morning of June 8, violence erupted again in Kokand and surrounding villages. A crowd took over the Kokand railway station; the proceeded to drain fuel from a tank and threatened to set it on fire and blow up nearby tanks unless participants in the pogroms who had been arrested were released and the Meskhetian Turks and police officers trying to protect them were handed over. Pogromists managed to take control of the Novokokand chemical plant, and other local enterprises, but Soviet troops managed to take back control of the facilities. As looting and arson on Meskhetian Turk homes continued, the homes of police officers who tried to stop the violence were also attacked. In the end, the Meskhetian Turks who remained in the area had to be evacuated by helicopter.

In Kokand, 23 people were killed, of which 14 were residents of Kokand.

=== Attacks in other regions ===
Smaller-scale attacks on Meskhetian Turks also took place in other cities and towns such as Andijon, Namagan, and Surkhtepa.

==== Andijon oblast ====
On June 4, in the village of Surkhtepa, located within the Akhunbabaev district of the Andijon oblast, pogromists expelled Meskhetian Turks from their homes and then set their home on fire.

==== Namagan oblast ====
On the afternoon of June 11, in the center of Namagan oblast, around 300 people armed with improvised weapons such ranging from sticks and stones to axes and bottles of gasoline headed for areas populated by Meskhetian Turks, but were stopped at a railroad station by the police. The crowd threw stones at the militia instead after refusing to back down.

==== Tashkent oblast ====
In Yangibod, Tashkent oblast, hooligans chanting "Death to Turks" tried to storm the Meskhetian section of the town, but after the police fired warning shots they dispersed.

== Damage ==
According to the commission of the Central Committee of the Communist Party of the Uzbek SSR, 103 people died during the pogrom, including 52 Meskhetian Turks and 36 Uzbeks, and over 1,000 people were injured, including at least 137 servicemen of the internal troops and at least 110 police officers were wounded, one of whom (Tashkul Suvankulov) later died from his injuries from when he was stabbed during an attack in Kokand. 757 residential buildings, 27 government facilities, and 275 vehicles were burned and looted. However, these numbers are likely an underestimate to downplay the scale of the casualties.

While Meskhetian Turks were the primary targets of the pogrom, several Crimean Tatars were killed by the mobs of attackers in a chaos, and Soviet airlifts of civilians from the areas of the pogrom to Tajik SSR evacuated both Meskhetian Turks and Crimean Tatars.

== Aftermath and reactions ==
=== Government reactions ===
Authorities in Moscow and Tashkent quickly claimed that the riots were planned by the mafia, the political enemies of Russian President Gorbachev or by Uzbek nationalists. Nikolai Ryzhkov expressed shock that the attackers included local-level party officials. MVD Colonel Yevgeny Aleksandrovich Nechaev, (Note: Occasionally spelled Nechayev.) who had previously witnessed the Sumgait pogrom in the Azerbaijan SSR remarked that the Sumgait pogroms "did not even come close to the Fergana nightmare."

An initial 17,000 Meskhetian Turks were evacuated by the Soviet Army in the immediate aftermath of the pogroms, and another 70,000 left almost immediately thereafter. Most of the airlifts took place between June 9 and June 18.

Due to allegations that alcohol played a role in the events, authorities in Quvasoy oblast took the step of temporarily banning sales of alcohol.

=== Meskhetian Turk reactions ===
After the pogroms, around 200 Meskhetian Turks rallied outside the Supreme Soviet requesting to meet with Gorbachev so they could tell him that want wanted to return to their homeland in Georgia. Following the pogroms, the majority of Meskhetian Turks, about 70,000, went to Azerbaijan, whilst the remainder went to various regions of Russia (especially Krasnodar Krai), Kazakhstan, Kyrgyzstan and Ukraine.

=== Uzbek reactions ===
Uzbek nationalist sentiments against other minorities persisted after the pogroms, but was never as severe as the pogroms against Meskhetian Turks. A significantly smaller pogrom targeting Armenian and Jewish shops took place the next year, but there were no fatalities. Eyewitnesses reported hearing mobs chant "Down with the Russians, home with the [Crimean] Tatars, and to Hanoi with the Koreans!"

== Perpetrators ==
While the many sources report that the mobs conducting the pogroms were ethnic Uzbeks, the extent to which representatives of other nationalities took part in the pogroms or were recruited to join the pogroms remains disputed. Some accounts state that some of the attackers were brought from outside of Central Asia but wore Uzbek national garb as they participated in the attacks to inflame ethnic tensions and weaken local-level Uzbek authorities.

=== Motives ===
According to the most commonly reported version of events, the pogrom originated at a market over a quarrel over a bowl of strawberries when allegedly a Meskhetian Turk customer knocked over a plate of strawberries belonging to an Uzbek saleswoman, or alternatively, a dispute arose about the price of the strawberries. It is unclear to what extent religion influenced the attacks; both Uzbeks and Meskhetian Turks are predominantly Sunni Muslim. Some attackers were rumored to have shouted Islamic slogans during the attacks, but others were seen drinking vodka, an alcoholic beverage. (Note: Alcohol is generally considered haram (forbidden) in Islam.)

==== Other theories ====
Jewish writer Boris Yusupov claimed that the pogrom took place because Meskhetian Turks were ordered by authorities in Moscow to attack the Bukharan Jewish community but they refused, so the KGB ordered an attack on them instead. According to another theory, the Crimean Tatars may have been the original intended target of the attacks. Theories that the pogroms were completely engineered by KGB are often considered far-fetched given the severe pre-existing ethnic tensions and the fact that the pogrom started in the small town of Quvasoy instead of somewhere more significant.

== Long-term effects ==
The pogroms had the effect of fragmenting the Meskhetian Turk community, who were dispersed as refugees to various other Soviet republics. In contrast, the Crimean Tatar movement to repatriate grew more powerful, reinforcing their desire to leave Central Asia. The local Jewish community was also incredibly alarmed by the massacre and hastened their exodus from Uzbekistan. Meskhetian Turks who fled Central Asia for Krasnodar were targeted for a pogrom again, this time by Russian Cossacks, but it was much smaller than the Fergana pogrom.

While the Crimean Tatars were able to secure the right of return to their homeland, the Meskhetian Turks were denied their right of return. The desire to return to Crimea had always been a "push" factor in increasing Crimean Tatar desire to return to their homeland, and the fear of another pogrom created a new "pull" factor from desire to leave the Uzbek SSR. Many Crimean Tatars who previously did not want to return changed their mind after the massacre, realizing that it could have been them. Speculation remains that the Crimean Tatars may have been the original intended target of the attacks.

The pogrom has been described as potentially an attempt at genocide. Russian mistrust of Islam also heightened as a result of the massacre.

== See also ==
- Ethnic cleansing of Georgians in Abkhazia
- Ethnic cleansing of Georgians in South Ossetia
- 1990 Dushanbe riots
- 1990 Osh clashes
- 2010 South Kyrgyzstan ethnic clashes
- Rooftop Koreans

== Bibliography ==
- UNHCR (1999b), Background Paper on Refugees and Asylum Seekers from Georgia, United Nations High Commissioner for Refugees
- "О трагических событиях в Ферганской области и ответственности партийных, советских и правоохранительных органов". Pravda Vostoka (in Russian). No. 176. 30 July 1989. pp. 1–2.
- Abashin, Sergey; Bushkov, Valentin (2004). Ферганская долина этничность, этнические процессы, этнические конфликты. Nauka.
- Abramson, David M. (1997). "Remembering the Present: The Meaning Today of the 1989 Violence in Kokand". Central Asia Monitor (3): 18–21.
- Arnold, Richard (2016). Russian Nationalism and Ethnic Violence: Symbolic Violence, Lynching, Pogrom and Massacre. Routledge. p. 88. ISBN 978-1-317-20947-8.
- Berg, Hetty (1998). Facing West: Oriental Jews of Central Asia and the Caucasus. University of Washington Press. ISBN 978-90-400-9216-9.
- Critchlow, James (2018). Nationalism In Uzbekistan A Soviet Republic's Road To Sovereignty. Taylor & Francis.
- Daniels, Mike (2005). "Assessing the Genocide and Political Mass Murder Framework: The Case of Uzbekistan". George Washington International Law Review. 37 (3–4).
- Derluguian, Georgi M. (2005). Bourdieu's Secret Admirer in the Caucasus: A World-System Biography. University of Chicago Press. ISBN 978-0-226-14282-1.
- Gaidar, Yegor (1993). Collapse of an Empire: Lessons for Modern Russia. Bloomsbury Publishing USA. ISBN 978-0-8157-4152-7.
- Golovkov, Anatoly (July 1989). "Затмение" (PDF). Ogonyok (29): 28–31. Archived from the original (PDF) on 14 March 2026.
- Drobizheva, Leokadia; Gottemoeller, Rose; Kelleher, Catherine McArdle; Walker, Lee (2015). Ethnic Conflict in the Post-Soviet World: Case Studies and Analysis: Case Studies and Analysis. Routledge. ISBN 978-1-317-47098-4.
- Jalālzaʼī, Mūsá K̲h̲ān (2002). Taliban and the New Great Game in Afganistan. Dua Publications.
- Leitzinger, Antero (1997). Caucasus and an Unholy Alliance. Kirja-Leitzinger. ISBN 978-952-9752-16-4.
- Mayhew, Bradley; Richmond, Simon; Plunkett, Richard (2000). Central Asia. Lonely Planet. ISBN 978-0-86442-673-4.
- McAuley, Mary (1997). Russia's Politics of Uncertainty. Cambridge University Press. ISBN 978-0-521-47976-9.
- Ochildiev, David; Pinkhasov, Robert; Kalontarov, Iosif (2007). A History and Culture of the Bukharian Jews. Roshnoyi-Light.
- Stanton, Andrea L.; Ramsamy, Edward; Seybolt, Peter J.; Elliott, Carolyn M. (2012-01-05). Cultural Sociology of the Middle East, Asia, and Africa: An Encyclopedia. SAGE Publications. p. 315. ISBN 978-1-4522-6662-6.
- Starr, S. Frederick (2014). Ferghana Valley: The Heart of Central Asia. Routledge. ISBN 978-1-317-47065-6.
- Sullivan, Patrick (2017). Economic Inequality, Neoliberalism, and the American Community College. Springer.
- Trier, Tom; Khanzhin, Andrei (2007). The Meskhetian Turks at a Crossroads: Integration, Repatriation Or Resettlement?. Lit. ISBN 978-3-8258-9628-7.
- Trier, Tom; Tarkhan-Mouravi, George; Kilimnik, Forrest (2011). Meskhetians: Homeward Bound... European Centre for Minority Issues – Caucasus. ISBN 978-9941-0-3531-9.
- Williams, Brian Glyn (2021). The Crimean Tatars: The Diaspora Experience and the Forging of a Nation. BRILL. ISBN 978-90-04-49128-1.
- Williams, Brian Glyn (2015). The Crimean Tatars: From Soviet Genocide to Putin's Conquest. Oxford University Press. ISBN 978-0-19-049471-1.
