= Turkey–Turkmenistan relations =

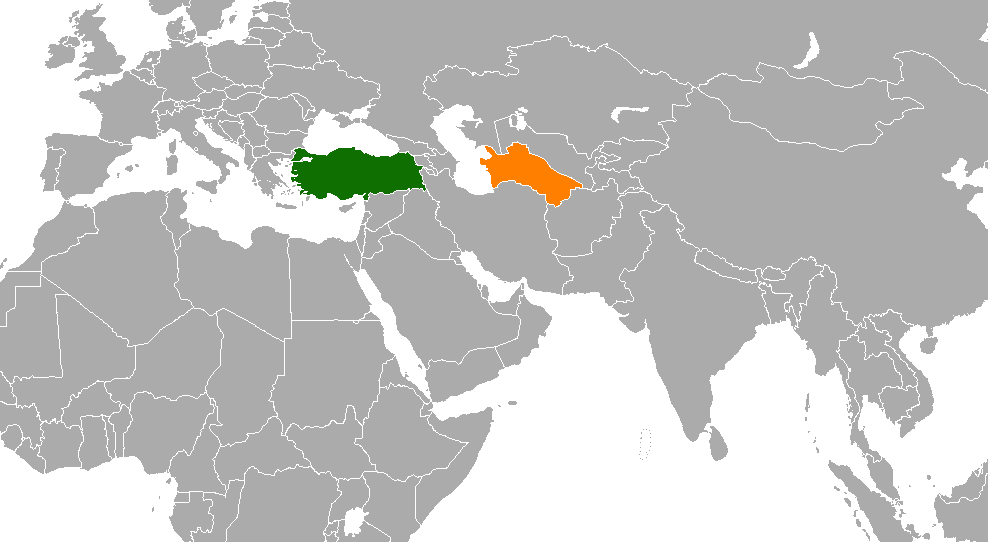
- Turkey: Turkmenistan

Diplomatic mission
- Embassy of Turkey, Ashgabat: Embassy of Turkmenistan, Ankara

Turkey–Turkmenistan relations refers to diplomatic relations between Turkmenistan and Turkey. They have a very close relationship.

Turkey was the first country in the world to recognize the independence of Turkmenistan during the period of dissolution of the Soviet Union and first country that opened an embassy in the newly independent country. Turkmenistan has an embassy in Ankara and a consulate general in Istanbul, while Turkey has an embassy in Ashgabat.

Both countries are full members of the Economic Cooperation Organization, Organisation of Islamic Cooperation, International Organization of Turkic Culture and Organization for Security and Co-operation in Europe. The two countries share close cultural connections, with both having a majority Sunni Muslim population and being predominantly inhabited by Turkic peoples. Both the Turkish and Turkmen languages belong to the Oghuz subgroup of Turkic languages, which means that Turkmens can understand Turkish and vice versa.

Turkey is one of the 47 countries in the world that holders of a Turkmen passport can visit without a visa.

== Political relations ==
=== State visits ===
Turkey was the first country to recognize the independence of Turkmenistan in 1992. In 1995, Turkey supported Turkmenistan’s initiative to adopt a policy of neutrality, which was officially recognized by a resolution of the United Nations General Assembly.

On 5 December 2007, President of Turkey Abdullah Gül paid an official visit to Turkmenistan.

From 24 to 25 March 2008, President of Turkmenistan Gurbanguly Berdimuhamedow made an official visit to Turkey.

From 11 to 12 November 2010, President of Turkey Abdullah Gül visited Turkmenistan on an official visit.

On 30 May 2011, Abdullah Gül made a working visit to the city of Türkmenbaşy.

On 28 February 2012, following his second inauguration as President of Turkmenistan, Gurbanguly Berdimuhamedow paid his first official visit abroad to Ankara.

On 13 June 2012, Cemil Çiçek, Speaker of the Grand National Assembly of Turkey, visited Ashgabat.

From 9 to 10 August 2012, Gurbanguly Berdimuhamedow made a working visit to Istanbul and İzmir.

From 29 to 31 May 2013, President of Turkey Abdullah Gül paid a state visit to Turkmenistan.

== Economic relations ==
Net trade between two countries in 2009 was 1.6 billion USD and that number constituted 52% increase compared with the numbers for 2008. At that time Turkey was the second largest trade partner for Turkmenistan. As of 2013 more than 600 companies from Turkey had implemented over 1270 investment projects with about 1200 of them having the total value of 15 billion USD. Increasing economic cooperation between two countries has made Turkmenistan Turkey's first partner in Central Asia by number of projects implemented.

== See also ==
- Foreign relations of Turkey
- Foreign relations of Turkmenistan
- Turks in Turkmenistan
