= Turkey–Uzbekistan relations =

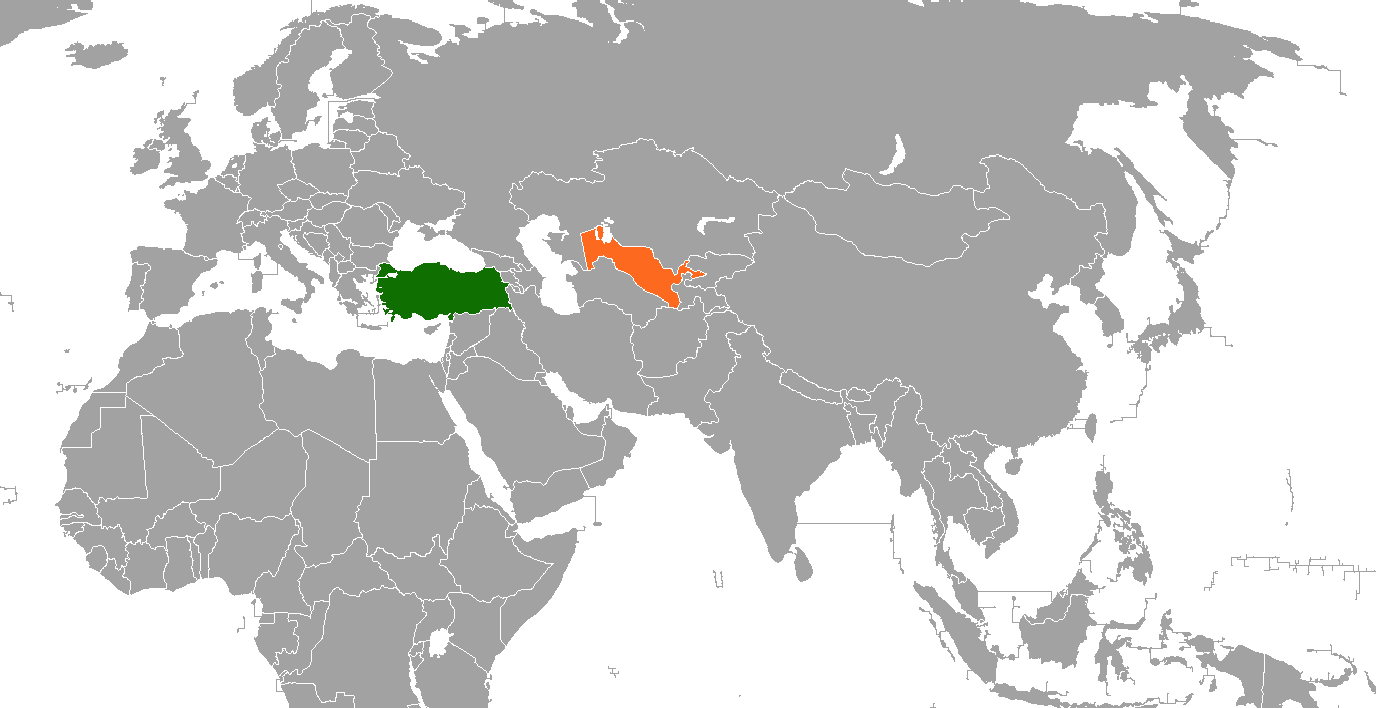

- Turkey: Uzbekistan

Diplomatic mission
- Turkish Embassy, Tashkent: Uzbek Embassy, Ankara

Following Uzbekistan's independence from the Soviet Union, Turkey has been especially active in pursuing economic projects and social, cultural, and diplomatic initiatives in Uzbekistan. On December 16, 1991, Turkey was the first country to recognize Uzbekistan and among the first to open an embassy in Tashkent.

The relations between Turkey and Uzbekistan spanned for 1,000 years, which are unique because of their close heritages, but also equally conflicted one due to complex ties between them. Being the representatives of the two largest Turkic tribes, the Oghuz and Karluks, both countries were also the embodiments of the two most successful Turkic state-builders in the history, in which they created numerous powerful empires like Kara-Khanid Khanate and Seljuk Empire, to medieval and pre-modern Ottoman Empire and Timurid Empire (as well as the Karluk branch in India). As for the result, their relations had been a mix of both cooperation and antagonism due to rivalling political powers and their influences of descending entities, at least before the arrival of the Russian Empire in Central Asia, and the British Empire in both South and West Asia.

Since gaining independence, Uzbek wariness of Russian influence led Uzbekistan to seek closer ties with other countries. The cultural kinship and proximity of Turkey has encouraged close relations and allowed to create relations with its immediate Central Asian neighbors, Russia and other nations of the CIS. During the early 1990s, Turkey has made early commitments for expansion of trade and cooperation, funding Uzbek development schemes with a US$700 million (worth US$1.3 billion in 2020) credit and pledging yearly 2,000 scholarships for Uzbek students to study in Turkey. However, this relationship was soured after Turkey decided to harbour Muhammad Salih, an Uzbek dissident and a renowned Turco-Islamist, and the suspicion of the 1999 Tashkent bombings being orchestrated by Ankara at the back. Turkey was among some of the few countries to have harshly criticised Uzbekistan's handling of the 2005 Andijan massacre. Relations would only improve following Shavkat Mirziyoyev's ascension to Presidency in 2016.

Both Turkey and Uzbekistan are full members of the Organization of Turkic States. Turkey has been a participant to the political entity since the Nakhchivan Agreement in 2009, and Uzbekistan joined as a full-fledged member in 2019. Uzbekistan, as the only Central Asian state bordering on all other countries, is important to the Turkish commitment in ensuring stability, prosperity, and security in Central Asia. Since then, Turkey and Uzbekistan have developed a strong relationship with more than 100 bilateral agreements and protocols concluded between the two countries.

== History ==
=== Ancient relations ===
Both the modern Anatolian Turkish and Uzbek populations traced ancestries to the ancient Oghuz and Karluk tribes from the line of Western Turkic Khaganate. They were also the earliest to form their separate entities from the start, the Oghuz and Karluk Yabghu States, fostering their future relations.

The Karluks were the earliest to form their modern Turkic state post-Western Turkic Khaganate, as the Kara-Khanid Khanate, which was also the first Turks to adopt Islam; while the Oghuz moved southward to form their future Seljuk Empire in Persia, being the first of the Turkic tribe to undergo Persianisation of culture. Relations between them were competitive from the start, as the Karakhanids reigned supreme for the first part, before the Seljuks overpowered the Karakhanids by conquering Samarkand in 1089, from which the Karakhanids became vassal to the Oghuz Seljuks for a century before being replaced by the Khwarazmian Empire (also a Persianised Oghuz dynasty), which also temporarily vassalised the Karakhanids. But that relations ended when the Mongols invaded Khwarazmia and destroyed the entire state in process; the Oghuz were forced to flee to Anatolia, while the Karluks fell to Mongol rule as the Chagatai Khanate. This event drastically altered their paths, as Oghuz went on to form the Ottoman Empire; while the Karluks blended their dominant Turkic traits with Mongol, Chinese, Persian and Indian features.

=== Ottoman–Gurkani relations ===
After the fall of the Mongol Empire, one Karluk minor leader, Timur, went on to form the Timurid Empire and became the most feared conqueror in the history after his distant ancestor Genghis Khan (whom Timur modelled after). The Oghuz Ottomans, already expanding in Europe and the Middle East, increasingly viewed the Karluk Timurids as a threat, and multiple insult letters were exchanged between Bayezid I and Timur. After years of hostilities, the Ottoman–Timurid War broke out with the Battle of Ankara of 1402 the decisive clash that saw Timur defeated and captured Bayezid. After being captured, Bayezid experienced different types of treatments (with conflicted accounts), though when he died in 1403, Timur did mourn Bayezid's death. The capture of Bayezid proved important as it plunged the Ottoman state into a civil war that lasted for a decade.

However, unlike the Ottoman Empire that would later recover and even emerge stronger, the Timurid Empire started to fragment after Timur's death, though its final collapse came in 1507. However, a surviving Prince from Andijan, Babur, went on to re-establish the Gurkani realm in India, now known as Mughal Empire. The relations between the two were initially very hostile because Selim I saw Babur as deceit while Babur hated Selim I for using political influence to bar him from returning to Andijan. Relations between them improved on when Babur set his sight to conquer India after Selim I feared the Safavid Empire could ally with Babur, dispatched Ustad Ali Quli and Mustafa Rumi, and many other Ottoman Turks, in order to assist Babur in his conquests; this particular assistance proved to be the basis of future Mughal-Ottoman relations. Ottoman relations with the Karluks of Central Asia and India would later drift differently later on, with the Ottomans preferred to maintain fluctuated ties with both, and even imported influences from the Timurid Renaissance. Regarding the Uzbek Khanate, Ottoman Empire's relations were distant and largely cordial.

Following the Ottoman conquest of Egypt, however, the Gurkani realm in India refused to acknowledge the Ottoman Empire as the rightful Islamic power and the Ottoman Sultan, thus, was not regarded as Caliph by the Timurid dynasty. This bitter relationship was later reignited as the Gurkani Mughal Empire became increasingly Indianised by culture while maintained deep ties to the Central Asian heartland, which was intensified under the reign of Akbar, who proclaimed Din-i Ilahi and Sulh-i-kul, as opposed to the Ottoman's tolerance yet segregationist policies of dividing peoples via religions and later, races.

Both empires would later crumble under persistent Western pressures, with the Gurkani realm fell to Britain in 1857, the Uzbek Khanate fell to Russia in late 19th century, and the Ottoman state collapsed after 1923. During this era, Enver Pasha, the perpetrators of the Armenian, Greek, Assyrian, Arab, Jewish and Kurdish genocides and deportations, fled to Central Asia, initially at the request of the Soviets to crush the Basmachi movement that started in modern Uzbekistan, only to defect before getting killed.

=== Modern relations ===
In April 1992, Turkey recognized the independence of the Republic of Uzbekistan and established diplomatic relations with the country. Even earlier, in 1991, Uzbek President Islam Karimov paid a visit to Turkey. Subsequent official visits took place in June and November 1994. In October 1998, Karimov participated in celebrations marking the 75th anniversary of Turkey's victory in the War of Independence (1919–1923). During this visit, talks were held between the leaders of the two states, resulting in the creation of a treaty framework for relations between Turkey and Uzbekistan. In particular, a Treaty of Eternal Friendship and Cooperation was signed, along with other agreements concerning trade, scientific and technical collaboration, military affairs, the fight against terrorism, and the prevention of drug trafficking. In total, 78 agreements were concluded.

During the 1990s and 2000s, Turkey maintained close ties with representatives of the Uzbek opposition, which for a long time hindered the normal development of relations between the two countries. This was best expressed by the infamous 1999 Tashkent bombings, which Uzbekistan suspected Muhammad Salih, an Uzbek dissident, of being behind the bombings and Turkish intelligence might have assisted it. In retaliation, Uzbekistan closed down Islamist-based institutions that was financed by Ankara in 2001.

Turkey was among some of the few countries to have harshly criticised Uzbekistan's handling of the 2005 Andijan massacre. This action soured the relations between the two states even further.

After the death of Islam Karimov and the election of Shavkat Mirziyoyev as president, relations improved and reached the level of a strategic partnership.

== Economic relations ==
In 2017, trade between the two countries increased to US$1.5 billion.

A preferential trade agreement is in effect between the two countries.

Between January and May 2023, 121 joint ventures were established in Uzbekistan.

== Presidential visits ==
Guest	Host	Place of visit	Date of visit
(Uzbekistan) President Shavkat Mirziyoyev	(Turkey) President Recep Tayyip Erdoğan	Presidential Complex, Ankara	February 19–20, 2020
(Turkey) President Recep Tayyip Erdoğan	(Uzbekistan) President Shavkat Mirziyoyev	Tashkent	March 29–30, 2022

== See also ==
- Foreign relations of Turkey
- Foreign relations of Uzbekistan
- Turks in Uzbekistan
- Mendirman Jaloliddin
