= Meskhetian Turks =

Turkish ethnic subgroup from Meskheti region of Georgia

Ahıska Türkleri მესხეთის თურქები
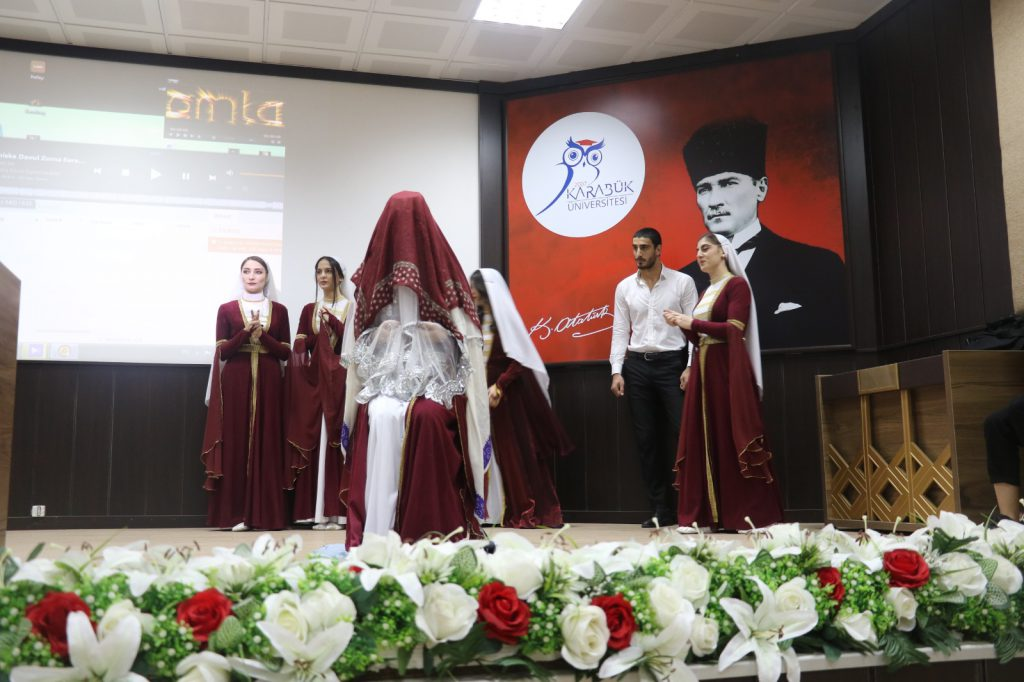
- Meskhetian Turks in Karabük, Turkey

Total population
- 1944 deportee population: est. 400,000 in 1990 , Current deportee population: 500,000–600,000

Regions with significant populations
- Georgia: 1,500
- Turkey: 100,000
- Kazakhstan: 150,000–250,000
- Azerbaijan: 90,000–130,000
- Russia: 70,000–100,000
- Kyrgyzstan: 42,000–55,000
- Uzbekistan: 15,000–38,000
- Ukraine: 8,000–15,000
- United States: 9,000–16,000
- Northern Cyprus: 180

Languages
- Meskhetian Turkish dialect Azerbaijani · Russian · Georgian · Kazakh · Kyrgyz

Religion
- Predominantly Sunni Islam, minority Shia Islam

Related ethnic groups
- Georgians, Karapapakhs, other Turks, Tsalka Urums

Meskhetian Turks, also referred to as Turkish Meskhetians, Ahiska Turks, and Turkish Ahiskans, (Turkish: Ahıska Türkleri; Georgian: მესხეთის თურქები, romanized: meskhetis turkebi) are a Turkish ethnic subgroup who historically inhabited the Meskheti region of Georgia, along the border with Turkey. The Turkish presence in Meskheti began with the Ottoman military expedition of 1578, although Turkic tribes had settled in the region as early as the eleventh and twelfth centuries.

Today, the Meskhetian Turks are widely dispersed throughout the former Soviet Union (as well as in Turkey and the United States) due to forced deportations during World War II. At the time, the Soviet Union was preparing to launch a pressure campaign against Turkey, and Joseph Stalin wanted to clear the strategic Turkish population in Meskheti deemed likely to be hostile to Soviet government intentions. In 1944, the Meskhetian Turks were accused of smuggling, banditry and espionage in collaboration with their kin across the Turkish border. Expelled by Joseph Stalin from Georgia in 1944, they faced discrimination and human-rights abuses before and after deportation. Approximately 115,000 Meskhetian Turks were deported to Central Asia, and subsequently only a few hundred have been able to return to Georgia, as Georgia does not allow repatriation. Those who migrated to Ukraine in 1990 settled in shanty-towns inhabited by seasonal workers.

== Genetics ==
Out of the tested DNA samples of Meskhetian Turks, the most common Y-chromosomal haplogroup among them is Haplogroup J, in the second place is the Y-chromosomal haplogroup G.

== Origins and terms ==
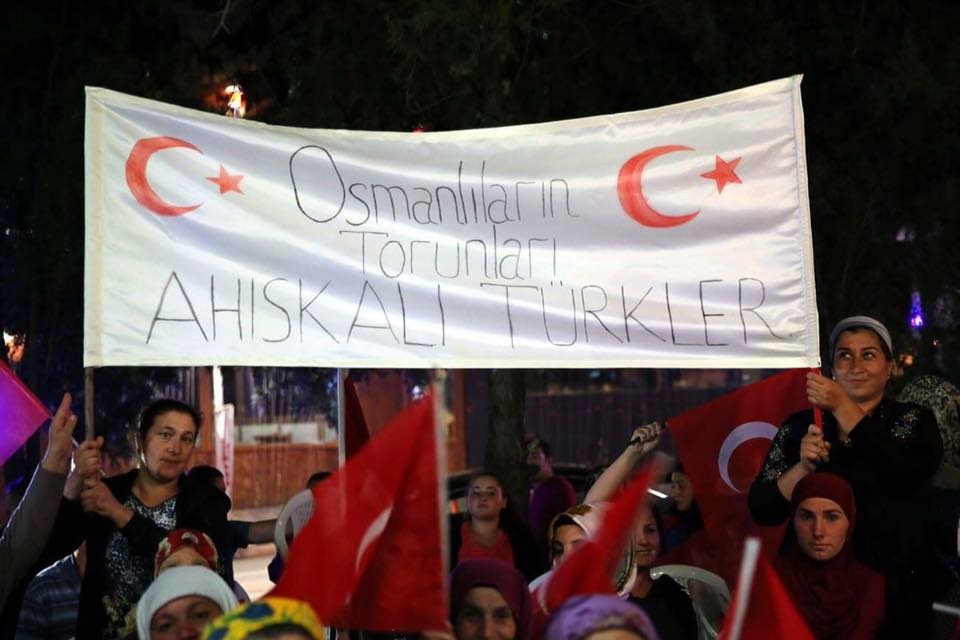
Meskhetian/Ahıska Turks holding a banner which reads "The Ottoman Grandchildren: Ahıska Turks"

Most Meskhetian Turks identify themselves as having descended from Ottoman settlers.

Pro-Georgian historiography has traditionally argued that the Meskhetian Turks, who speak the Kars dialect of the Turkish language and belong to the Hanafi school of Sunni Islam, are simply Turkified Meskhetians (an ethnographic subgroup of Georgians) converted to Islam in the period between the sixteenth century and 1829, when the region of Samtskhe–Javakheti (Historical Meskheti) was under the rule of the Ottoman Empire.

The Russian anthropologist and historian Professor Anatoly Michailovich Khazanov has argued against the pro-Georgian narrative and has said that:

it is quite possible that the adherents of this [pro-Georgian] view oversimplified the ethnic history of the group, particularly if one compares it with another Muslim Georgian group, the Adzhar, who in spite of their conversion to Islam have retained, not only the Georgian language, but to some extent also the Georgian traditional culture and self-identification. Contrary to this, the traditional culture of Meskhetian Turks, though it contained some Georgian elements, was similar to the Turkish one.

While Turkish-Armenian writer and linguist Sevan Nişanyan has written that:

The people of the city of Batumi and the autonomous region of Adjara (and the Borcka-Hopa side of Artvin and the Meydancık valley of Şavşat) are Muslim Georgians, speaking the Adjara dialect. They were subject to Georgia until the 1810s and lived under direct or indirect Christian rule. The people of Ahıska (and Şavşat-Yusufeli, Posof) have lived under Islamic rule for 450 years. They have long spoken Turkish, perhaps intertwined with other elements of Ottoman Islam.

Anthropologist Kathryn Tomlinson has pointed out that in Soviet documents about the 1944 deportations of the Meskhetian Turks, the community were referred to simply as "Turks" because of their faith Islam, not only them but also every Muslim of Georgia was referred as Turks and that it was after their second deportation from Uzbekistan that the term "Meskhetian Turks" was invented. According to Ronald Wixman, the term "Meskhetian" only came into use in the late 1950s. Indeed, the majority of the Meskhetian Turks call themselves simply as "Turks" or "Ahiskan Turks" (Turkish: Ahıska Türkleri) referring to the region, meaning "Turks of Ahiska Region". The Meskhetians claim sometimes that the medieval Cumans-Kipchaks of Georgia (Kipchaks in Georgia) may have been one of their possible ancestors. According to historians, it is less likely because part of the Kipchaks left Georgia during the invasion of Mongols, while others joined Mongols.

== History ==
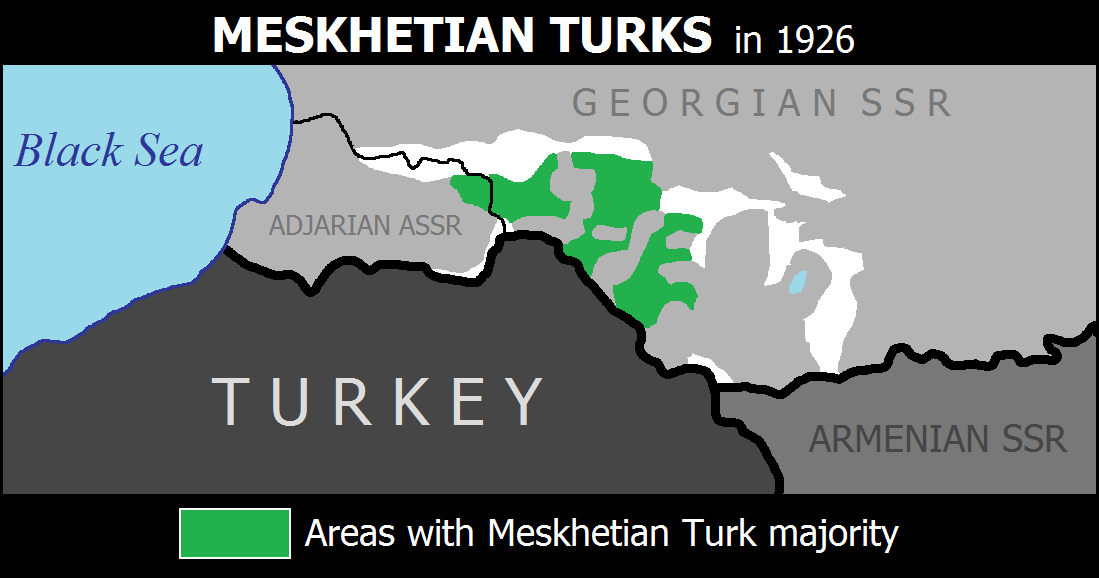
The area of distribution of Meskhetian Turks within Georgian SSR, 1926.

=== Ottoman conquest ===
By the Peace of Amasya (1555), Meskheti was divided into two, with the Safavids keeping the eastern part and the Ottomans gaining the western part. In 1578, the Ottomans attacked the Safavid possessions in Georgia, which initiated the Ottoman–Safavid War of 1578–1590, and by 1582 the Ottomans were in possession of the eastern (Safavid) part of Meskheti. The Safavids regained control over the eastern part of Meskheti in the early 17th century. However, by the Treaty of Zuhab (1639), all of Meskheti fell under Ottoman control, and it brought an end to Iranian attempts to retake the region.

=== Soviet rule ===
==== 1944 deportation from Georgia to Central Asia ====
On 15 November 1944, the then General Secretary of the CPSU, Joseph Stalin, ordered the deportation of over 115,000 Meskhetian Turks from their homeland, who were secretly driven from their homes and herded onto rail cars. As many as 30,000 to 50,000 deportees died of hunger, thirst and cold and as a direct result of the deportations and the deprivations suffered in exile. The Soviet guards dumped the Meskhetian Turks at rail sidings across a vast region, often without food, water, or shelter.

According to the 1989 Soviet Census, 106,000 Meskhetian Turks lived in Uzbekistan, 50,000 in Kazakhstan, and 21,000 in Kyrgyzstan. As opposed to the other nationalities who had been deported during World War II, no reason was given for the deportation of the Meskhetian Turks, which remained secret until 1968. It was only in 1968 that the Soviet government finally recognised that the Meskhetian Turks had been deported. The reason for the deportation of the Meskhetian Turks was because in 1944 the Soviet Union was preparing to launch a pressure campaign against Turkey. In June 1945 Vyacheslav Molotov, who was then Minister of Foreign Affairs, presented a demand to the Turkish Ambassador in Moscow for the surrender of three Anatolia provinces (Kars, Ardahan and Artvin). As Moscow was also preparing to support Armenian claims to several other Anatolian provinces, war against Turkey seemed possible, and Joseph Stalin wanted to clear the strategic Georgian-Turkish border where the Meskhetian Turks were settled and who were likely to be hostile to such Soviet intentions.

Unlike the other deported Muslim groups, the Meskhetians have not been rehabilitated nor permitted to return to their homeland. In April 1970, the leaders of the Turkish Meskhetian national movement applied to the Turkish Embassy in Moscow for permission to emigrate to Turkey as Turkish citizens if the Soviet government persisted its refusal to allow them to resettle in Meskheti. However, the response of the Soviet government was to arrest the Meskhetian leaders.

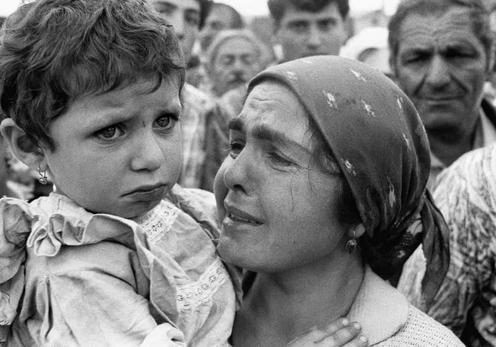
Meskhetian Turk woman and her child

==== 1989 deportation from Uzbekistan to other Soviet countries ====
In 1989, riots broke out between the Meskhetian Turks who had settled in Uzbekistan and the native Uzbeks. Nationalist resentments against the Meskhetians who had competed with Uzbeks for resources in the overpopulated Fergana Valley boiled over. Hundreds of Meskhetian Turks were killed or injured, nearly 1,000 properties were destroyed and thousands of Meskhetian Turks fled into exile. The majority of Meskhetian Turks, about 70,000, went to Azerbaijan, whilst the remainder went to various regions of Russia (especially Krasnodar Krai), Kazakhstan, Kyrgyzstan and Ukraine.

=== Khojaly Massacre ===
Meskhetian Turk refugees who had been persecuted in Central Asia were forcibly relocated to Azerbaijan where they settled in Khojaly in Nagorno Karabakh before being subsequently massacred along with Azerbaijanis in 1992.

=== Russo-Ukrainian War ===
Around 2,000 Meskhetian Turks have been forced to flee from their homes in Ukraine since May 2014 amid fighting between government forces and pro-Russian separatists. Turkish Meskhetian community representative in the eastern city of Donetsk, Nebican Basatov, said that those who have fled have sought refuge in Russia, Azerbaijan, Turkey and different parts of Ukraine. Over 300 Meskhetian Turks from the Turkish-speaking minority in eastern Ukraine have arrived in eastern Turkey's Erzincan province where they will live under the country's recently adopted asylum measures.

== Demographics ==
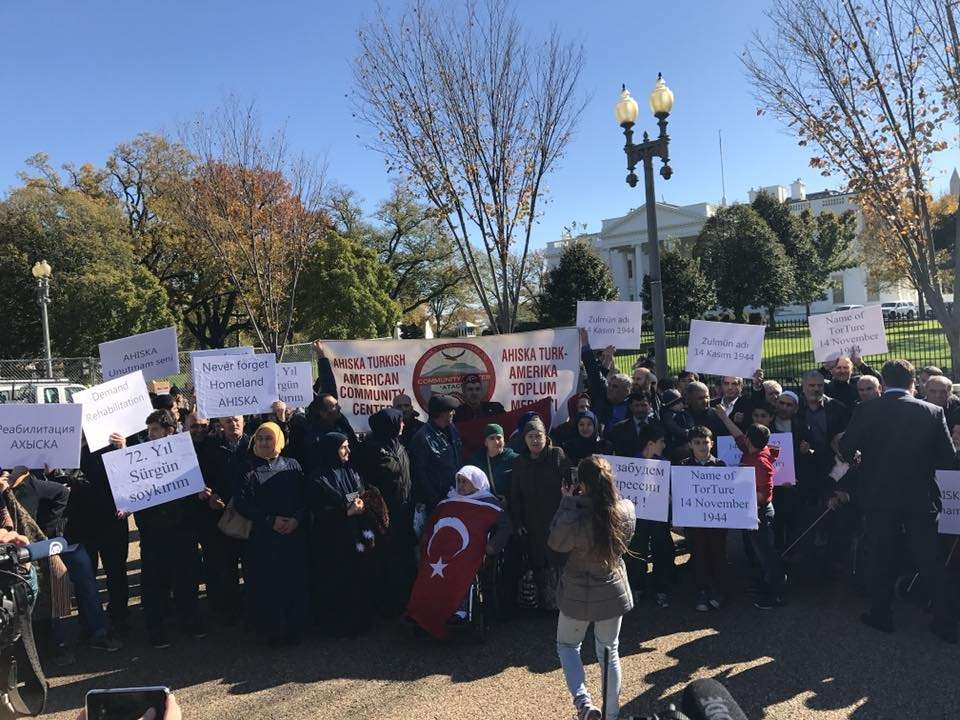
Ahiska Turks outside the White House in Washington D.C.

According to the 1989 Soviet Census, there were 207,502 Turks living in the Soviet Union. However, Soviet authorities recorded many Meskhetian Turks as belonging to other nationalities such as "Azeri", "Kazakh", "Kyrgyz", and "Uzbek". Hence, official censuses do not necessarily show a true reflection of the real population of the Meskhetian Turks; for example, according to the 2009 Azerbaijani census, there were 38,000 Turks living in the country; however, no distinction is made in the census between Meskhetian Turks and Turks from Turkey who have become Azerbaijani citizens, as both groups are classified in the official census as "Turks" or "Azerbaijani". According to the United Nations High Commissioner for Refugees report published in 1999, that 100,000 Meskhetian Turks lived in Azerbaijan and the defunct Baku Institute of Peace and Democracy stated, in 2001, that between 90,000 and 110,000 Meskhetian Turks lived in Azerbaijan, similarly, academic estimates have also suggested that the Turkish Meskhetian community of Azerbaijan numbers 90,000 to 110,000.

More recently, some Meskhetian Turks in Russia, especially those in Krasnodar, have faced hostility from the local population. The Krasnodar Meskhetian Turks have suffered significant human rights violations, including the deprivation of their citizenship. They are deprived of civil, political and social rights and are prohibited from owning property and employment. Thus, since 2004, many Turks have left the Krasnodar region for the United States as refugees. A large number of them, comprising nearly 1300 individuals, is in Dayton, Ohio. They are still barred from full repatriation to Georgia. Apart from that, in Georgia, racism against Meskheti Turks is still prevalent due to differences in beliefs and ethnic tensions.

== Culture ==
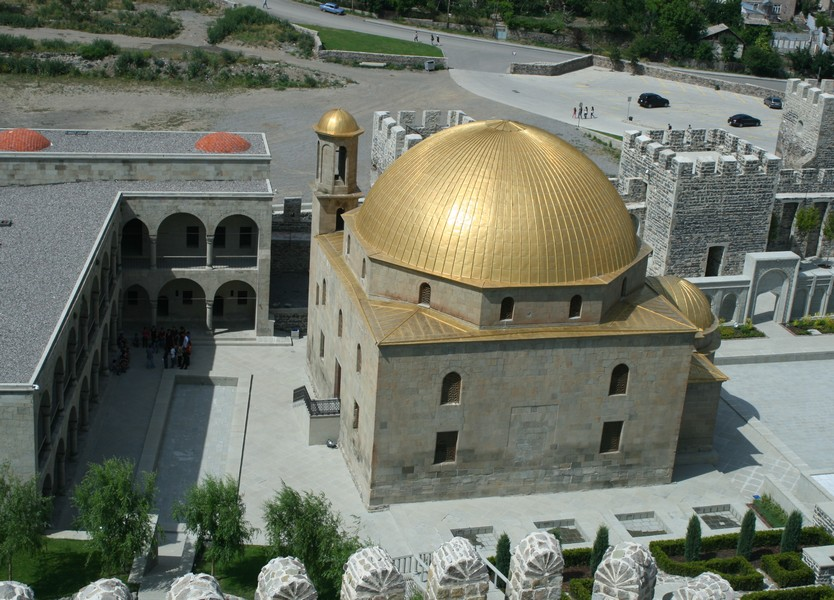
The former Ahmediye Mosque near the Akhaltsikhe Castle was built by the Ottomans in 1749.

=== Religion ===
Most Meskhetian Turks are Sunni Muslims and a minority are Shiite Muslims.

=== Language ===
Meskhetian Turkish
- Ahiska
- Region: former Soviet Union, Turkey
- Ethnicity: Meskhetian Turks
- Native speakers: c. 4,500 (2019–2026)
- Language family: Turkic: Common Turkic; Oghuz; Western; Turkish; Meskhetian Turkish
- Writing system: Cyrillic script

Language codes
- ISO 639-3: –

The Meskhetian Turks speak an Eastern Anatolian dialect of Turkish, which hails from the regions of Kars, Ardahan, Igdir and Artvin. The Turkish Meskhetian dialect has also borrowed from other languages (including Azerbaijani, Georgian, Kazakh, Kyrgyz, Russian, and Uzbek) which the Meskhetian Turks have been in contact with during the Russian and Soviet rule. It is commonly written using the Cyrillic script.

=== Wedding ===
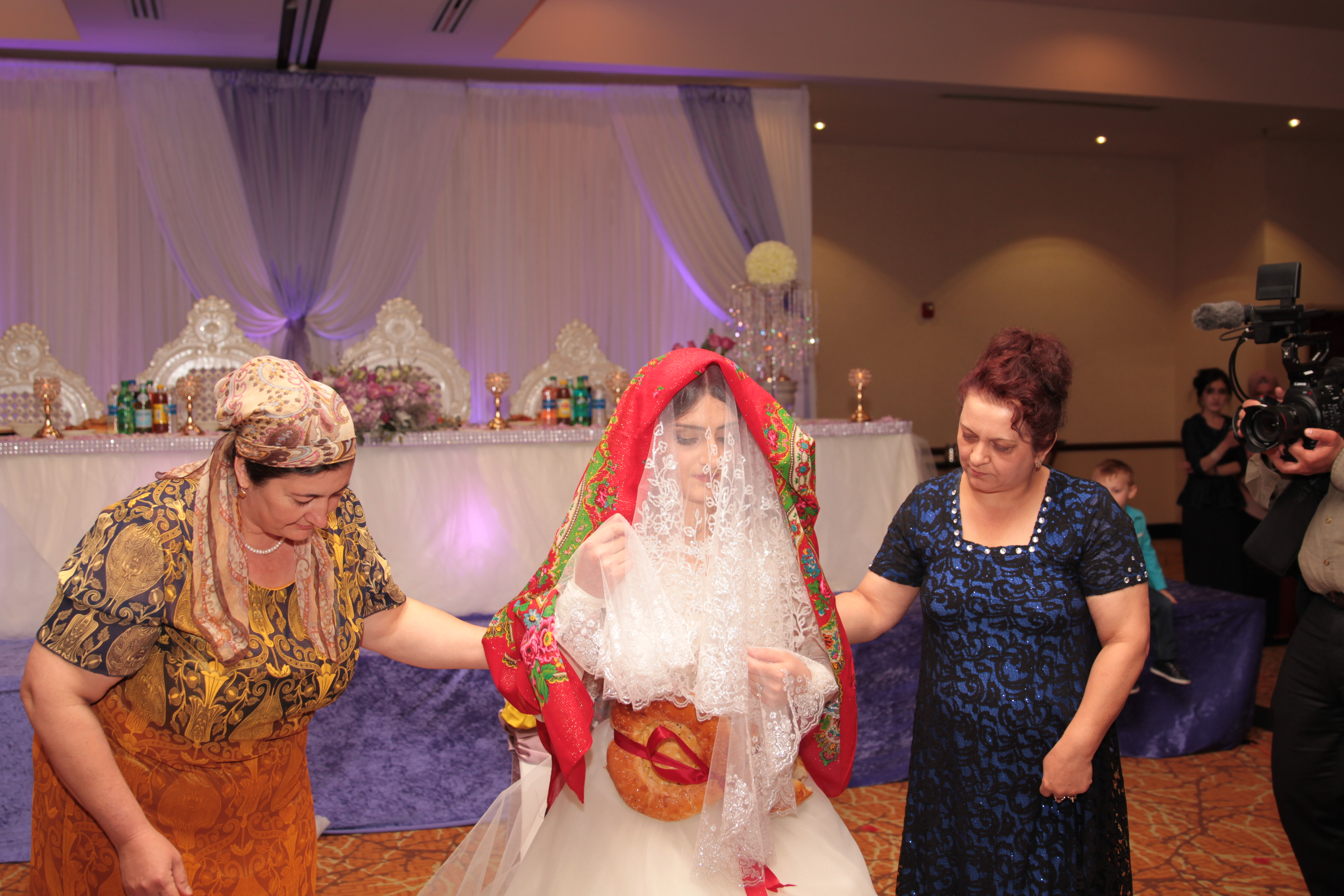
Meskhetian bride in traditional attire.

Meskhetian Turks' weddings consist of a traditional proposal from the groom's parents and if the bride's parents accept the proposal, an engagement party, or Nişan, is done. Everyone at the Nişan is given a ceremonial sweet drink, called Sharbat. The actual wedding lasts for two days. On the first day the bride leaves her house and on the second day is when the marriage happens. Before the bride enters her husband's house she uses the heel on her shoe to break two plates with her foot and applies honey on the doorway. This tradition serves the purpose of wishing happiness upon the new bride and groom in their marriage. At the end of the wedding, a dance ensues with the men and women dancing separately. Finally, the newlyweds have their last dance which is called the ‘Waltz’ and that completes the wedding.

=== Circumcision ===
The religious male circumcision ceremony of the Ahiska Turks, involves dance, music, guests, recitation of the Koran and a special Kirve (Sandek).

== Notable people ==
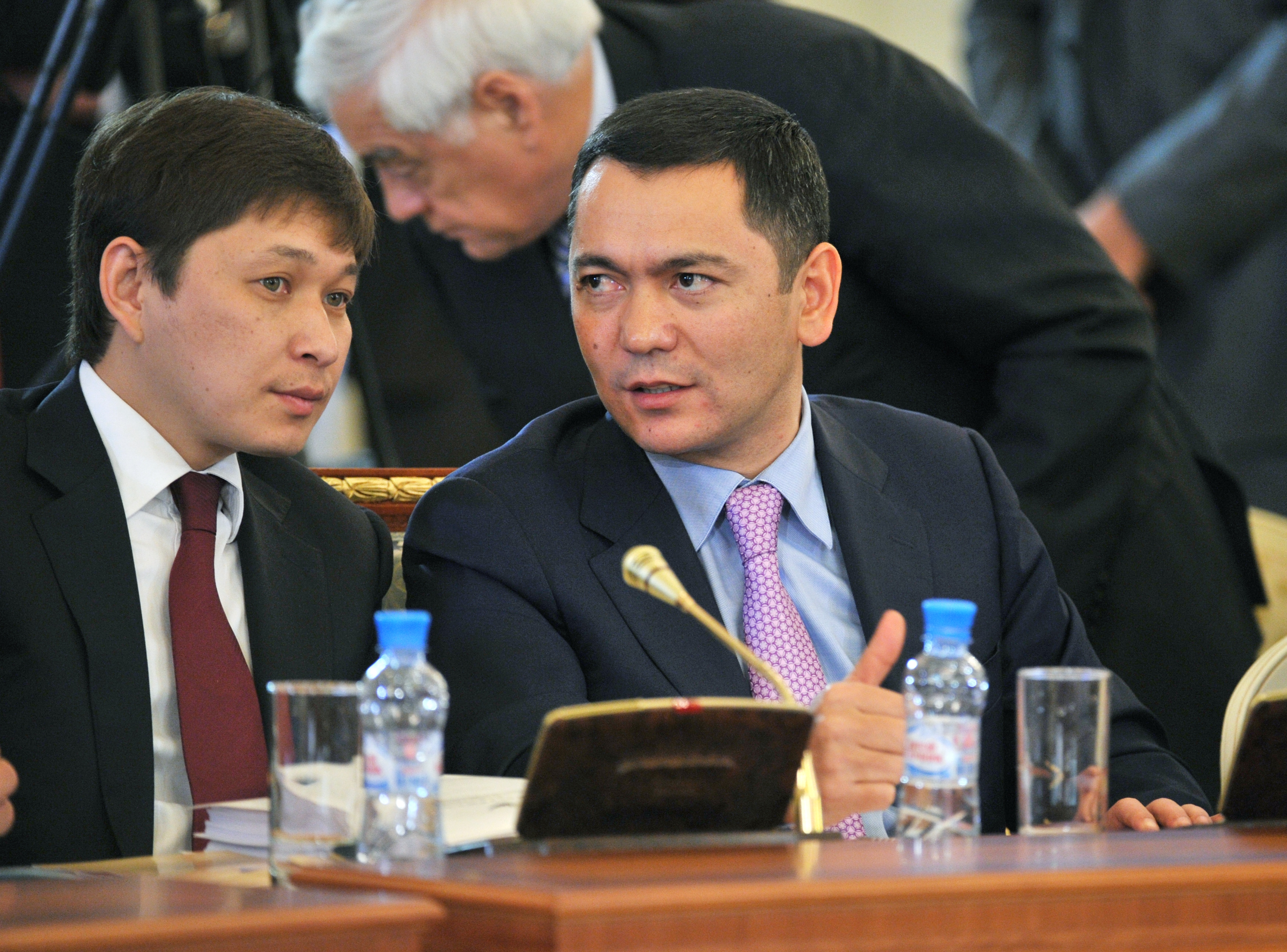
Ömürbek Babanov, Billionaire and former Prime Minister of Kyrgyzstan (2011–12).

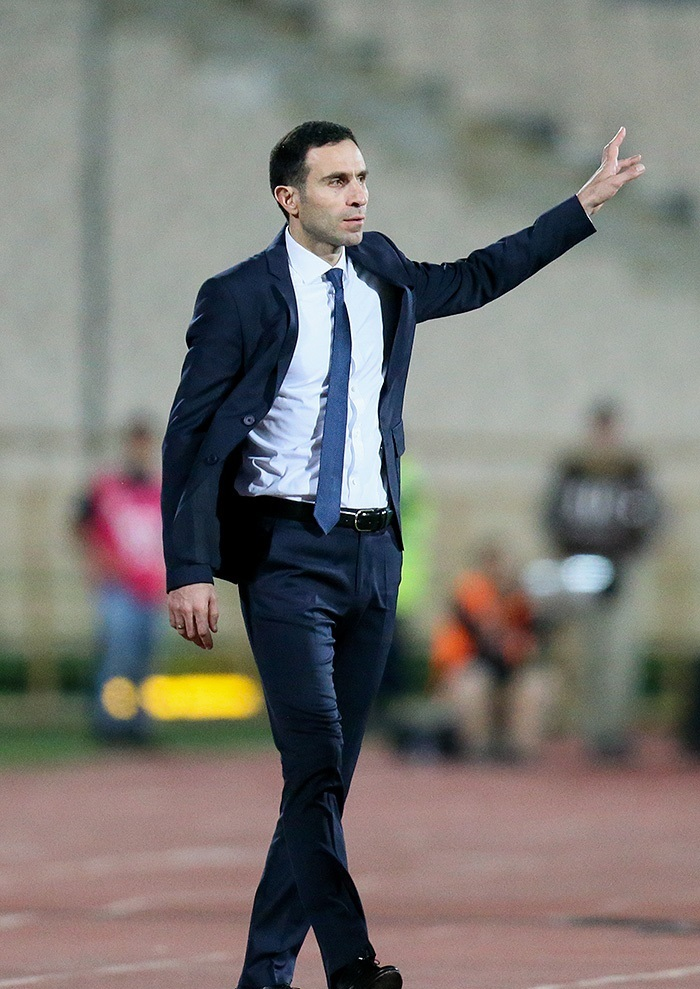
Timur Kapadze, football player and manager of the Uzbekistan national football team.

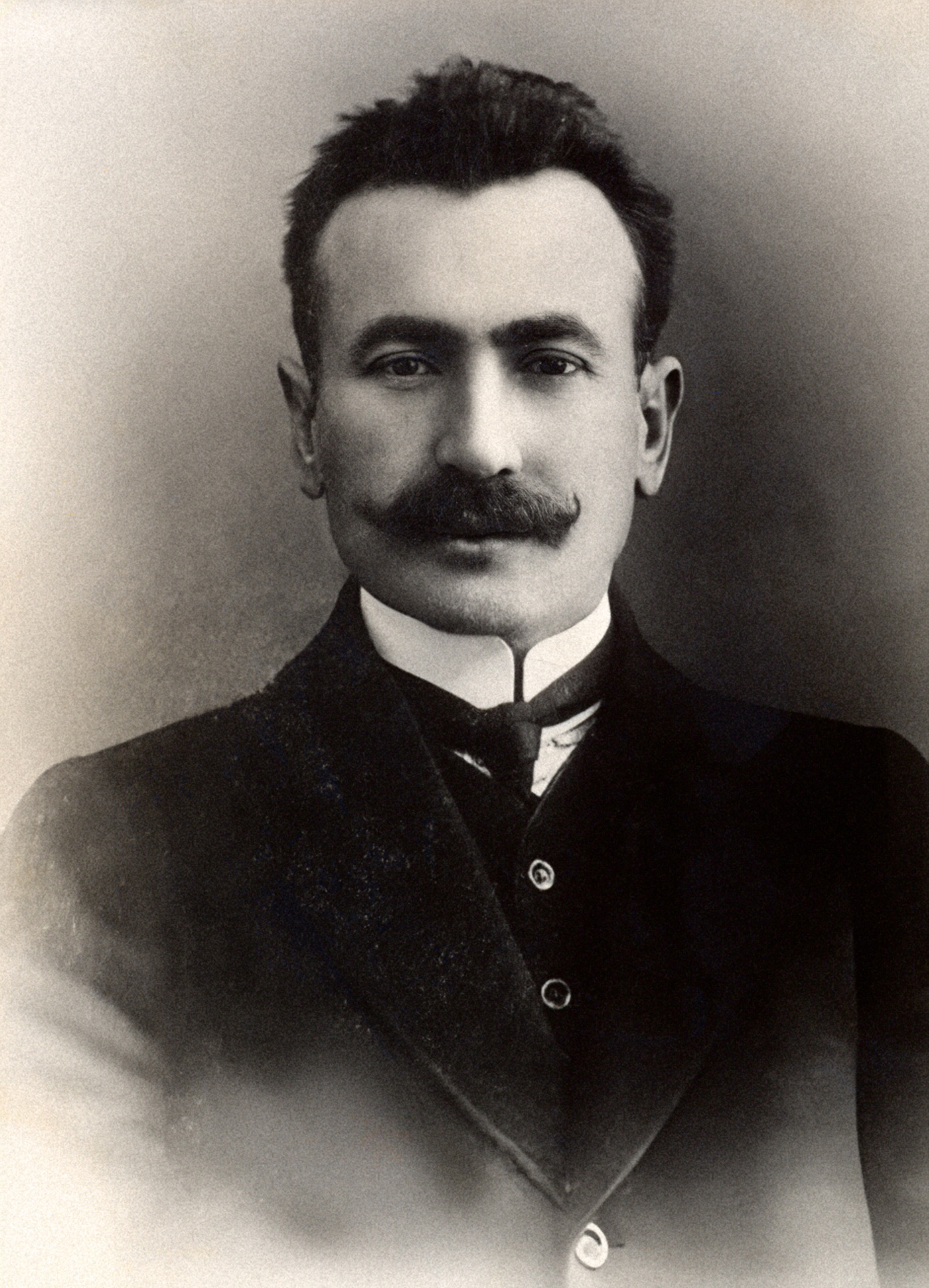
Omar Faig Nemanzadeh, writer in Azerbaijan.

The following is list of people of Turkish Meshetian origin:

- Sima Ağayeva, Azerbaijani artist
- Fatih Ahıskalı, Turkish musician
- Taner Akçam, Turkish historian
- Celal Al, Turkish actor in Diriliş: Ertuğrul and Kuruluş: Osman
- Osman Server Atabek, Turkish politician
- Aslan Atem, Turkish wrestler
- Tevfik Arif, Kazakh-Turkish billionaire, real estate developer and investor residing in the US
- Refik Arif, Kazakh businessman
- Ali Fuat Azgur, Turkish poet
- Isgender Aznaurov, Uzbek-born National Hero of Azerbaijan who fought in the First Nagorno-Karabakh War
- Ömürbek Babanov, Kyrgyz billionaire and politician who served as Prime Minister of Kyrgyzstan (2011–2012)
- Yusuf Rıza Bey, Ottoman soldier in the Teşkilât-ı Mahsusa special forces
- Ali Sami Boyar, Turkish painter and museologist
- Erdoğan Çakıcı, Turkish actor
- Adil Efendiyev, Azerbaijani literary critic
- Ata Demirer, Turkish filmmaker and comedian
- Şefika Şeyhzade-Efendizade, one of the first female journalists, educators, writers and philanthropists in Azerbaijan
- Muharrem Ergin, Turkish linguist and Turkologist
- Cabbar Faiqov, Azerbaijani military doctor
- Aşıq Feydayi, Azerbaijani ashik
- Abdurrahman Gulahmadov, Azerbaijani scientist
- Khalis Gulahmadov, Azerbaijani scientist
- Asif Hacılı, Azerbaijani literary critic
- Ahıskalı Ali Haydar, lawyer and mystic
- Niyaz Ilyasov, Russian judoka; medalists in the 2018 and 2019 World Judo Championships
- Elvira Kamaloğlu, Ukrainian-born Turkish female wrestler
- Takhir Kapadze, Uzbek football coach
- Timur Kapadze, Uzbek football player
- Handan Musaoğlu Kasa, Turkish presenter on TBMM TV
- Mediha Kayra, Ottoman-Turkish writer and teacher
- Abubekir Kurşumov, Russian architect and owner of the KavkazStroyGrupp construction company
- Movlud Miraliyev, Uzbek-born Azerbaijani judoka
- Mukhtar Mukhtarov, Kazakh football player
- Bahram Muzaffer, Uzbek boxer
- Ömer Faik Nemanzade, Azerbaijani journalist
- Mamedov Minur İsa Oğlu, Russian war hero during the Great Patriotic War
- Emrah Ormanoğlu, Ukrainian-born Turkish freestyle wrestler
- Fatih Osmanlı, Kazakh-born actor in the Turkish historical drama Kuruluş: Osman
- Buğra Öner, Turkish professional boxer
- Alptuğ Öner, Turkish professional boxer
- Cüneyt Özdemir, Turkish journalist
- Silahdar İbrahim Paşa, Ottoman statesman
- Ahmad bey Pepinov, Azerbaijani Minister of Agriculture
- Mikail Suleymanov, Uzbek actor, copywriter and film director
- Ravil Tagir, Kazakh-born Turkish football player
- Fırat Tanış, Turkish actor
- Yalçın Topçu, Turkish politician and former Ministry of Culture and Tourism
- Malik Mukhlis Ugli, Uzbek-Russian educator

== See also ==
- Turkish communities and minorities in the former Ottoman Empire
- Turks in the former Soviet Union
- Meskhetians
- Meskheti

== Bibliography ==
- Aydıngün, Ayşegül; Harding, Çiğdem Balım; Hoover, Matthew; Kuznetsov, Igor; Swerdlow, Steve (2006), Meskhetian Turks: An Introduction to their History, Culture, and Resettelment Experiences (PDF), Cultural Orientation Resource (COR) Center
- Barton, Frederick D.; Heffernan, John; Armstrong, Andrea (2002), "Being Recognised as Citizens" (PDF), www.humansecurity-chs.org, Commission on Human Security, archived from the original (PDF) on 17 July 2011
- Bennigsen, Alexandre; Broxup, Marie (1983), The Islamic threat to the Soviet State, Taylor & Francis, ISBN 0-7099-0619-6.
- Blacklock, Denika (2005), Finding Durable Solutions for the Meskhetians (PDF), European Centre for Minority Issues, archived from the original (PDF) on 2 June 2010
- Coşkun, Ufuk (2009), Ahiska/Meskhetian Turks in Tucson: An Examination of Ethnic Identity (PDF), University of Arizona, archived from the original (PDF) on 11 January 2012
- Cornell, Svante E. (2001), Small Nations and Great Powers: A Study of Ethnopolitical Conflict in the Caucasus, Routledge, ISBN 0-7007-1162-7.
- Council of Europe (2006), Documents: working papers, 2005 ordinary session (second part), 25–29 April 2005, Vol. 3: Documents 10407, 10449-10533, Council of Europe, ISBN 92-871-5754-5.
- Drobizheva, Leokadia; Gottemoeller, Rose; Kelleher, Catherine McArdle (1998), Ethnic Conflict in the Post-Soviet World: Case Studies and Analysis, M.E. Sharpe, ISBN 1-56324-741-0.
- Elbaqidze, Marina (2005), "Multiculturalism in Georgia: Unclaimed Asset or Threat to the State?", in Czyzewski, Krzystof; Kulas, Joanna; Golubiewski, Mikolaj (eds.), A Handbook of Dialogue: Trust and Identity.
- Enwall, Joakim (2010), "Turkish texts in Georgian script: Sociolinguistic and ethno-linguistic aspects", in Boeschoten, Hendrik; Rentzsch, Julian (eds.), Turcology in Mainz, Otto Harrassowitz Verlag, ISBN 978-3-447-06113-1.
- Floor, Willem (2001). Safavid Government Institutions. Costa Mesa, California: Mazda Publishers. ISBN 978-1568591353.
- Khazanov, Anatoly Michailovich (1995), "People with Nowhere To Go: The Plight of the Meskhetian Turks", After the USSR: Ethnicity, Nationalism and Politics in the Commonwealth of Independent States, University of Wisconsin Press, ISBN 0-299-14894-7.
- Kurbanov, Rafik Osman-Ogly; Kurbanov, Erjan Rafik-Ogly (1995), "Religion and Politics in the Caucasus", in Bourdeaux, Michael (ed.), The Politics of Religion in Russia and the New States of Eurasia, M.E. Sharpe, ISBN 1-56324-357-1.
- Mikaberidze, Alexander (2015). Historical Dictionary of Georgia (2 ed.). Rowman & Littlefield. ISBN 978-1442241466.
- Minahan, James (2002), Encyclopedia of the Stateless Nations: L-R, Greenwood Publishing Group, ISBN 0-313-32111-6.
- Pepinov, Fuad (2008), "The Role of Political Caricature in the Cultural Development of the Meskhetian (Ahiska) Turks", in Kellner-Heinkele, Barbara; Gierlichs, Joachim; Heuer, Brigitte (eds.), Islamic Art and Architecture in the European Periphery: Crimea, Caucasus, and the Volga-Ural Region, Otto Harrassowitz Verlag, ISBN 978-3-447-05753-0
- Polian, Pavel (2004), Against Their will: The History and Geography of Forced Migrations in the USSR, Central European University Press, ISBN 963-9241-68-7.
- Rasuly-Paleczek, Gabriele; Katschnig, Julia (2005), Central Asia on Display: Proceedings of the VIIth Conference of the European Society for Central Asian Studies, LIT Verlag Münster, ISBN 3-8258-8309-4.
- Rywkin, Michael (1994), Moscow's Lost Empire, M.E. Sharpe, ISBN 1-56324-237-0.
- Seferov, Rehman; Akış, Ayhan (2011), Sovyet Döneminden Günümüze Ahıska Türklerinin Yasadıkları Cografyaya Göçlerle Birlikte Genel Bir Bakıs (PDF), Türkiyat Araştırmaları Dergisi, archived from the original (PDF) on 27 September 2013
- Tomlinson, Kathryn (2005), "Living Yesterday in Today and Tomorrow: Meskhetian Turks in Southern Russia", in Crossley, James G.; Karner, Christian (eds.), Writing History, Constructing Religion, Ashgate Publishing, ISBN 0-7546-5183-5.
- UNHCR (1999a), Background Paper on Refugees and Asylum Seekers from Azerbaijan, United Nations High Commissioner for Refugees
- UNHCR (1999b), Background Paper on Refugees and Asylum Seekers from Georgia, United Nations High Commissioner for Refugees
- Wixman, Ronald (1984), The Peoples of the USSR: An Ethnographic Handbook, M.E. Sharpe, ISBN 0-87332-506-0.
