= List of diplomatic missions of Mali =

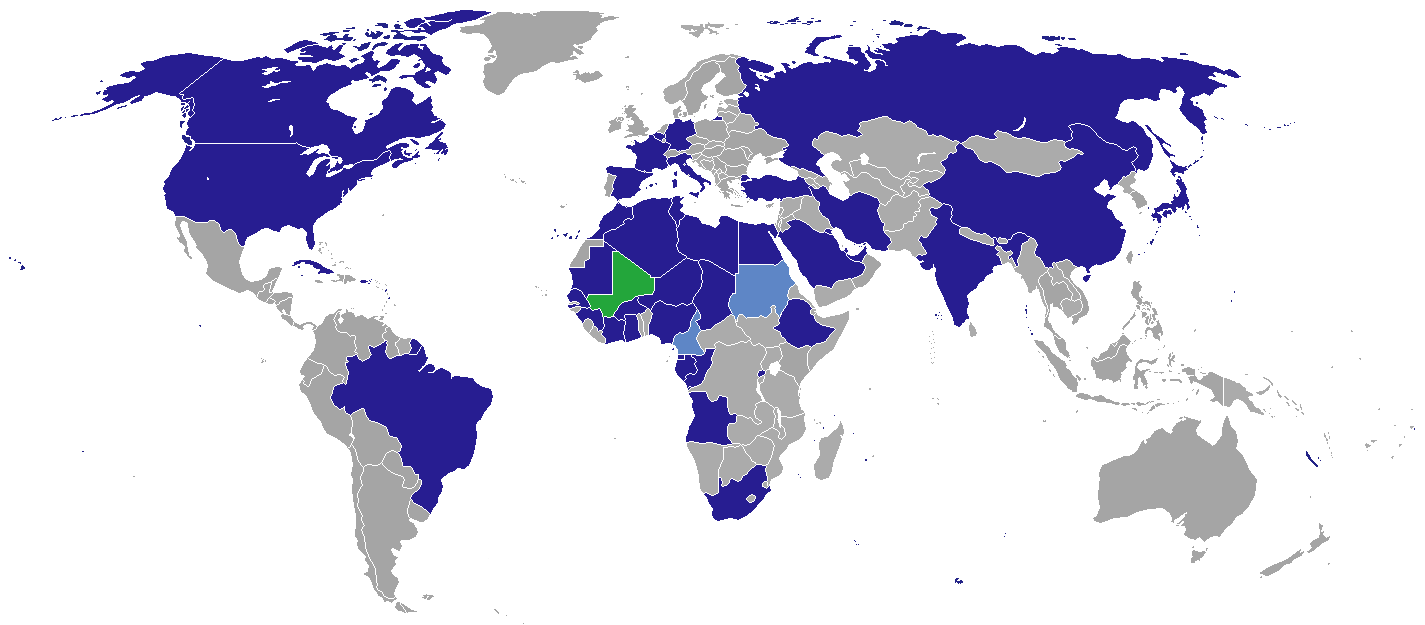
Map of Malian diplomatic missions

This is a list of diplomatic missions of Mali.

== Current missions ==
=== Africa ===
| Host country | Host city | Mission | Concurrent accreditation | Ref. |
|---|---|---|---|---|
| Algeria | Algiers | Embassy | | |
| Algeria | Tamanrasset | Consulate-General | | |
| Angola | Luanda | Embassy | Countries: Burundi; Namibia; Zambia | |
| Burkina Faso | Ouagadougou | Embassy | | |
| Cameroon | Douala | Consulate-General (Note: Subordinate to the embassy in Libreville.) | | |
| Chad | N’Djamena | Embassy | | |
| Congo-Brazzaville | Brazzaville | Embassy | Countries: Congo-Kinshasa | |
| Egypt | Cairo | Embassy | Countries: Cyprus; Eritrea; Jordan; Lebanon; Palestine; Sudan; Syria | |
| Equatorial Guinea | Malabo | Embassy | Countries: São Tomé and Príncipe | |
| Ethiopia | Addis Ababa | Embassy | Countries: Djibouti; Kenya; Somalia; Tanzania; Uganda; Multilateral Organizations: African Union | |
| Gabon | Libreville | Embassy | Countries: Cameroon; Central African Republic | |
| Ghana | Accra | Embassy | Countries: Benin; Togo | |
| Guinea | Conakry | Embassy | Countries: Liberia; Sierra Leone | |
| Ivory Coast | Abidjan | Embassy | | |
| Ivory Coast | Bouaké | Consulate-General | | |
| Libya | Tripoli | Embassy | Countries: Malta | |
| Mauritania | Nouakchott | Embassy | | |
| Morocco | Rabat | Embassy | | |
| Niger | Niamey | Embassy | | |
| Nigeria | Abuja | Embassy | | |
| Rwanda | Kigali | Embassy | | |
| Senegal | Dakar | Embassy | Countries: Cape Verde; Gambia; Guinea-Bissau | |
| South Africa | Pretoria | Embassy | Countries: Comoros; Botswana; Lesotho; Madagascar; Malawi; Mauritius; Mozambique; Seychelles; Zimbabwe | |
| Sudan | Khartoum | Consulate-General (Note: Subordinate to the embassy in Cairo.) | | |
| Tunisia | Tunis | Embassy | | |

=== Americas ===
| Host country | Host city | Mission | Concurrent accreditation | Ref. |
|---|---|---|---|---|
| Brazil | Brasília | Embassy | Countries: Bolivia; Argentina; Chile; Colombia; Ecuador; Guyana; Paraguay; Peru; Suriname; Trinidad and Tobago; Uruguay; Venezuela | |
| Canada | Ottawa | Embassy | | |
| Cuba | Havana | Embassy | Countries: Belize; Costa Rica; Dominican Republic; Guatemala; Haiti; Panama | |
| United States | Washington, D.C. | Embassy | Countries: Mexico | |

=== Asia ===
| Host country | Host city | Mission | Concurrent accreditation | Ref. |
|---|---|---|---|---|
| China | Beijing | Embassy | Countries: Cambodia; Laos; North Korea; Vietnam | |
| China | Guangzhou | Consulate-General | Countries: Cambodia; Laos; North Korea; Vietnam | |
| India | New Delhi | Embassy | Countries: Bangladesh; Bhutan; Brunei; Indonesia; Malaysia; Singapore; Sri Lanka; Thailand | |
| Iran | Tehran | Embassy | Countries: Afghanistan; Azerbaijan; Pakistan | |
| Japan | Tokyo | Embassy | Countries: Australia; New Zealand; Philippines; South Korea | |
| Kuwait | Kuwait City | Embassy | | |
| Qatar | Doha | Embassy | | |
| Saudi Arabia | Riyadh | Embassy | Countries: Oman | |
| Saudi Arabia | Jeddah | Consulate-General | Countries: Oman | |
| Turkey | Ankara | Embassy | | |
| United Arab Emirates | Abu Dhabi | Embassy | | |

=== Europe ===
| Host country | Host city | Mission | Concurrent accreditation | Ref. |
|---|---|---|---|---|
| Belgium | Brussels | Embassy | Countries: Ireland; Luxembourg; Netherlands; United Kingdom; Multilateral Organizations: European Union | |
| France | Paris | Embassy | Countries: Holy See; Portugal | |
| Germany | Berlin | Embassy | Countries: Austria; Denmark; Estonia; Finland; Iceland; Latvia; Lithuania; Norway; Poland; Sweden | |
| Italy | Rome | Embassy | Countries: Armenia; Georgia; Kazakhstan; Kyrgyzstan; Moldova; Mongolia; Tajikistan; Turkmenistan; Uzbekistan | |
| Russia | Moscow | Embassy | Countries: Albania; Bosnia and Herzegovina; Bulgaria; Croatia; Czechia; Greece; Hungary; North Macedonia; Romania; Serbia; Slovakia; Multilateral Organizations: International Fund for Agricultural Development; World Food Programme | |
| Spain | Madrid | Embassy | | |

=== Multilateral organisations ===
| Organization | Host city | Host country | Mission | Concurrent accreditation | Ref. |
|---|---|---|---|---|---|
| United Nations | New York City | United States | Permanent Mission | | |
| United Nations | Geneva | Switzerland | Permanent Mission | Countries: Switzerland | |

== Gallery ==
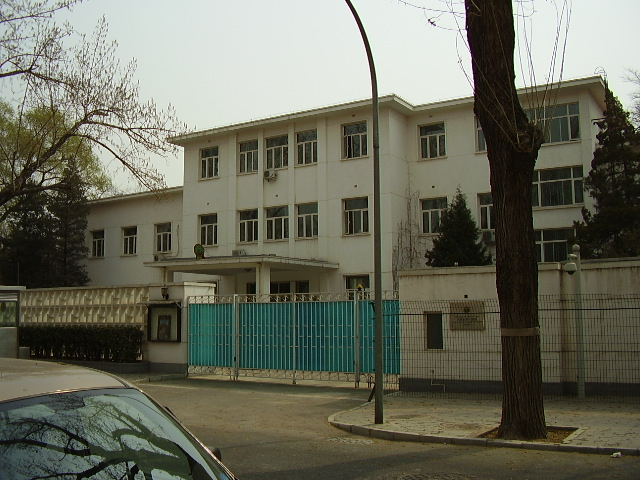
Embassy in Beijing

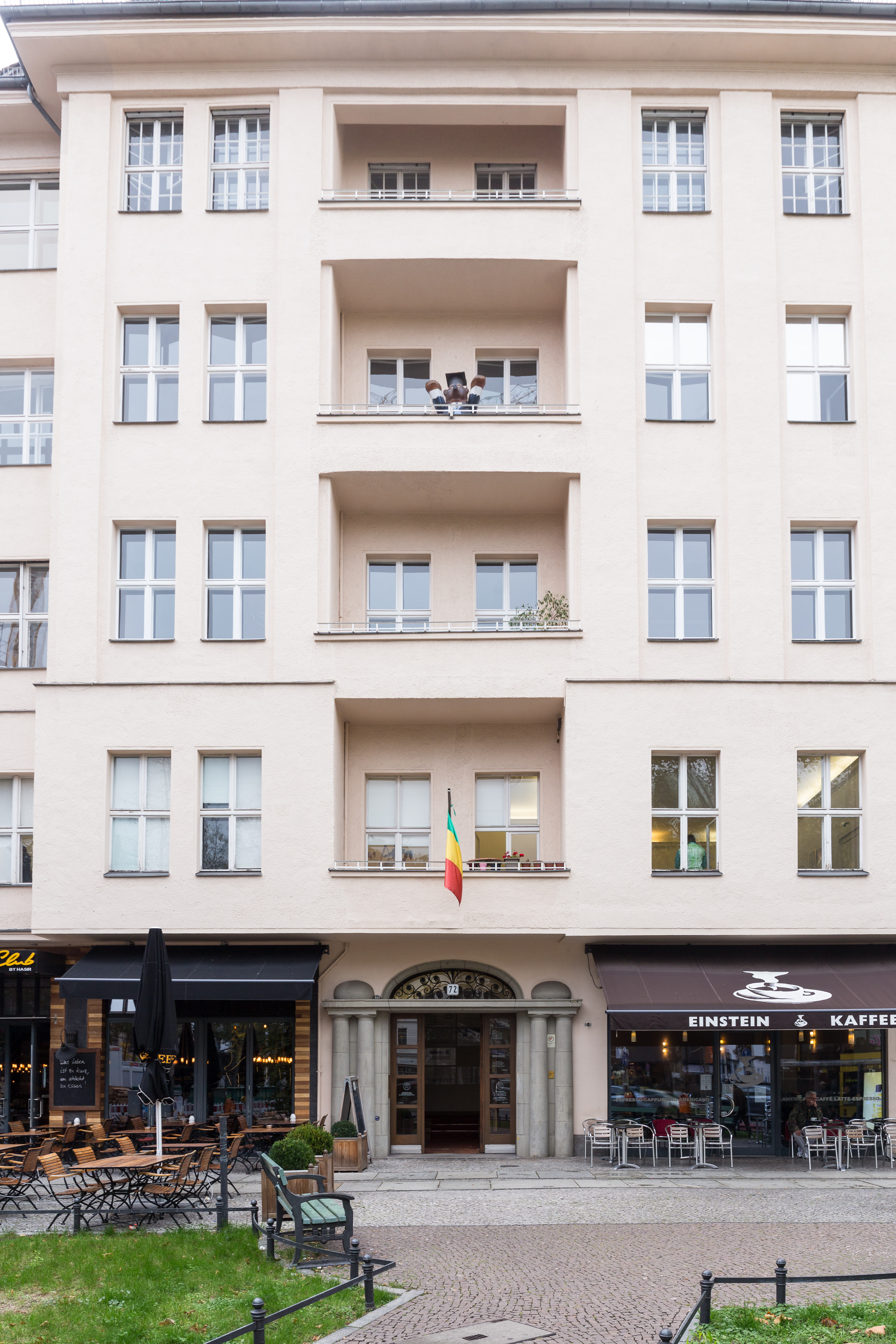
Embassy in Berlin

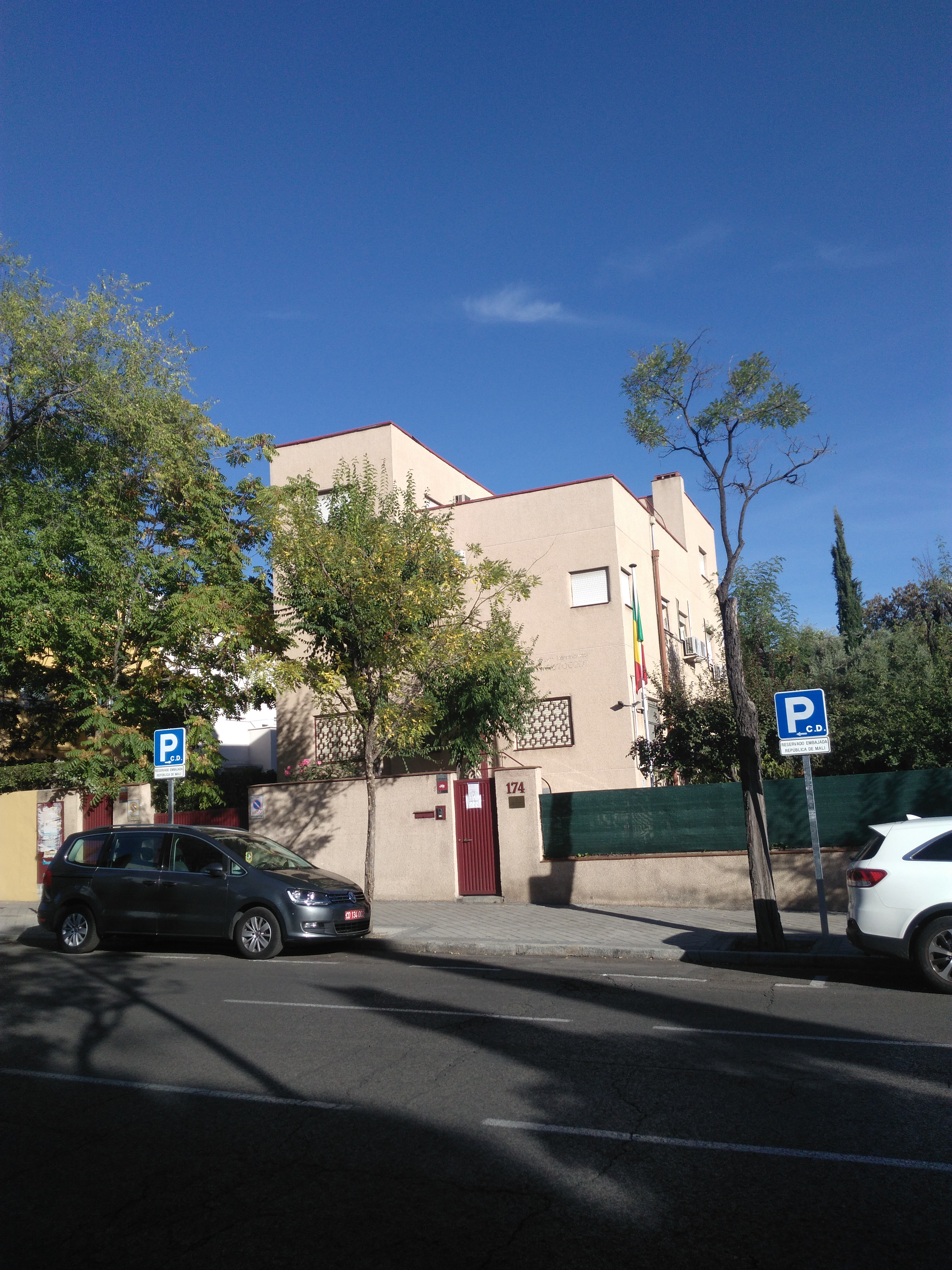
Embassy in Madrid

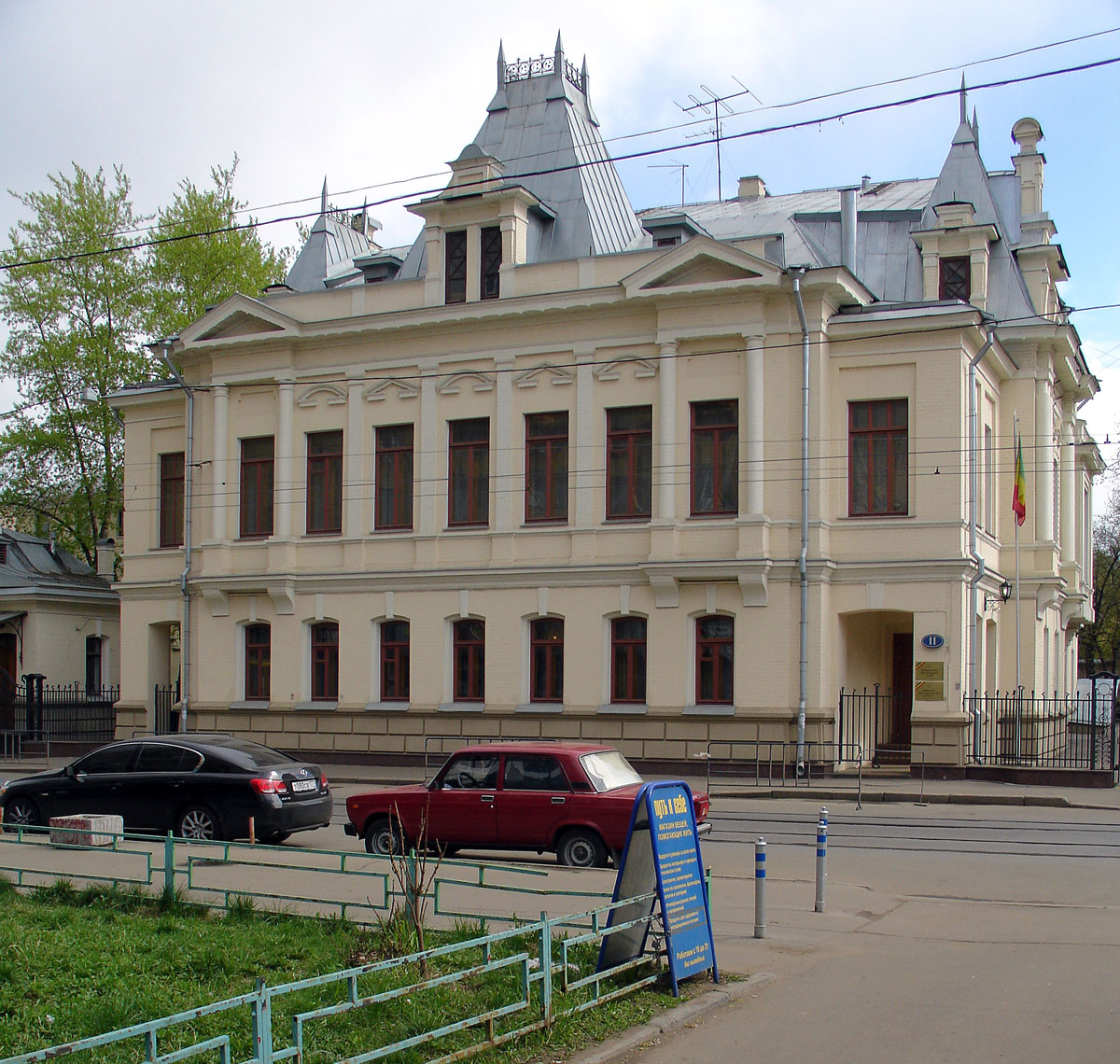
Embassy in Moscow

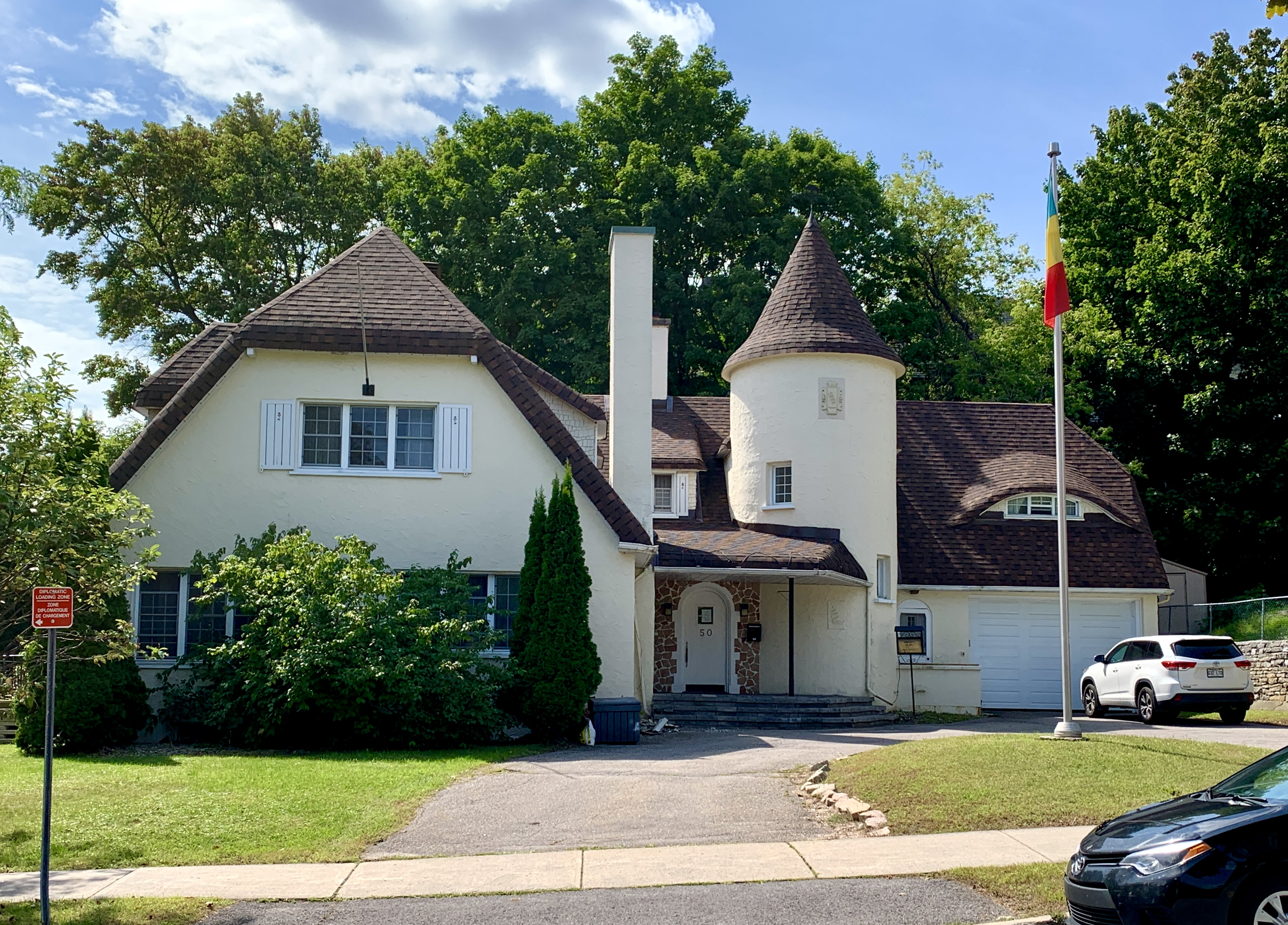
Embassy in Ottawa

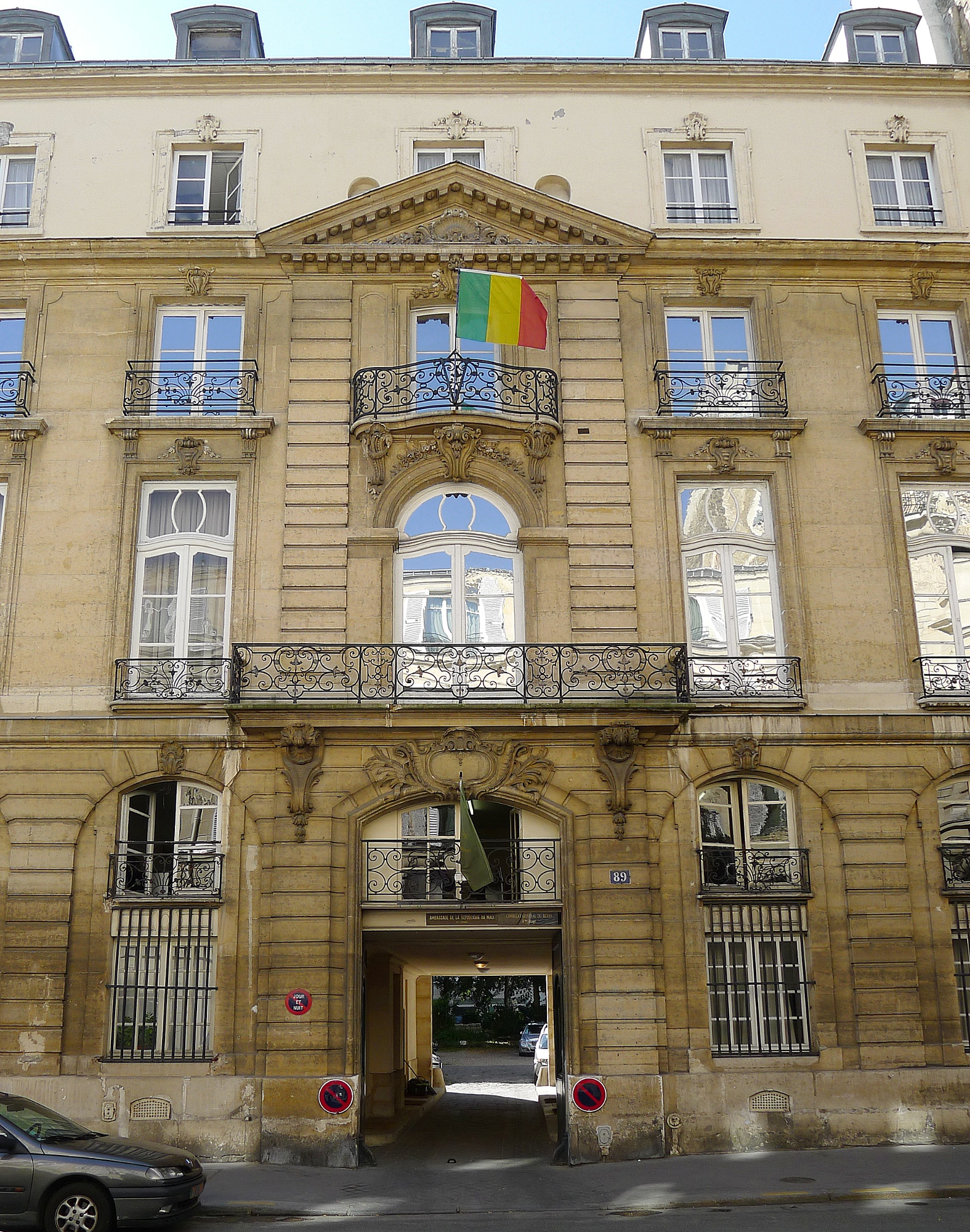
Embassy in Paris

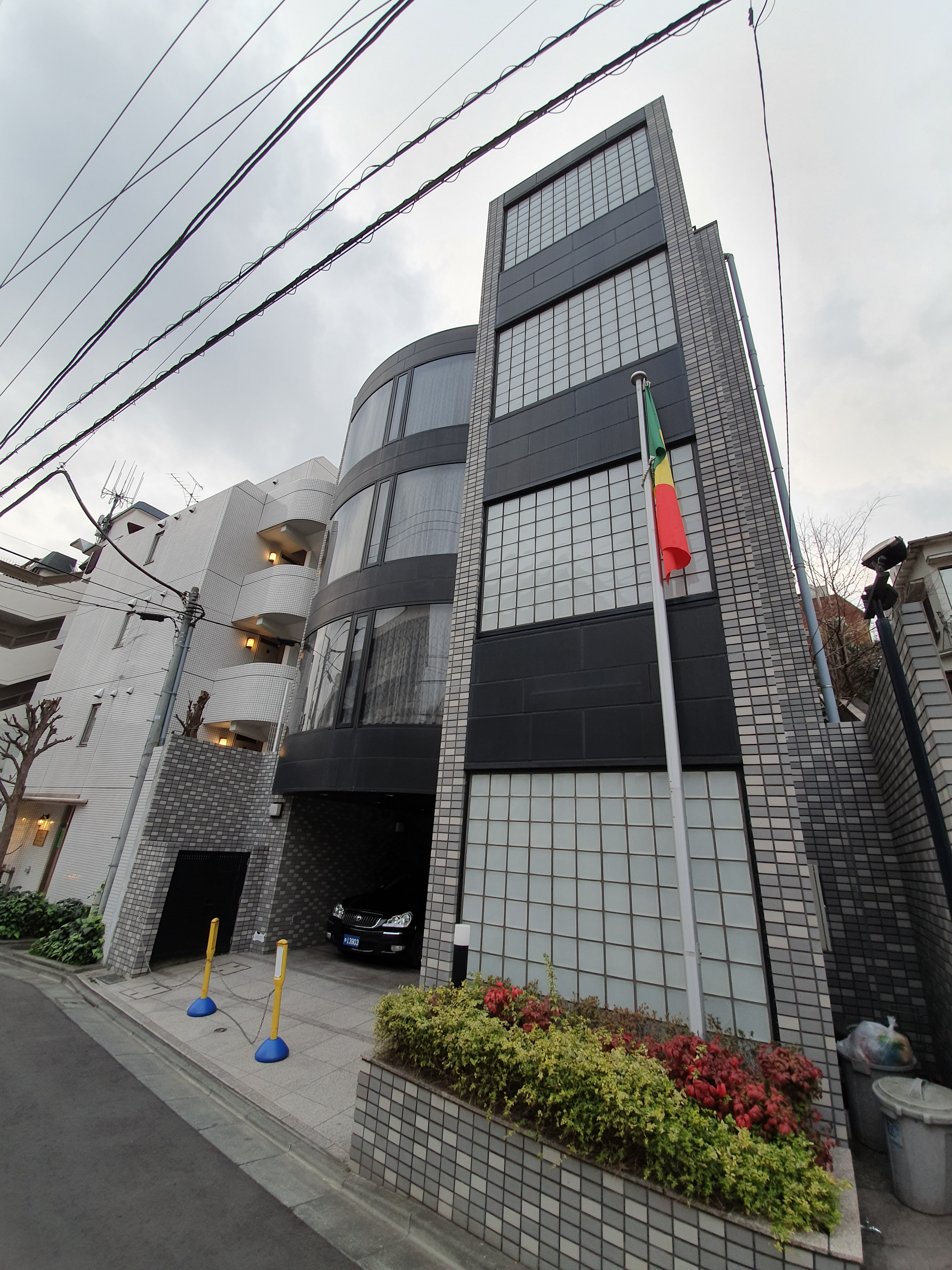
Embassy in Tokyo

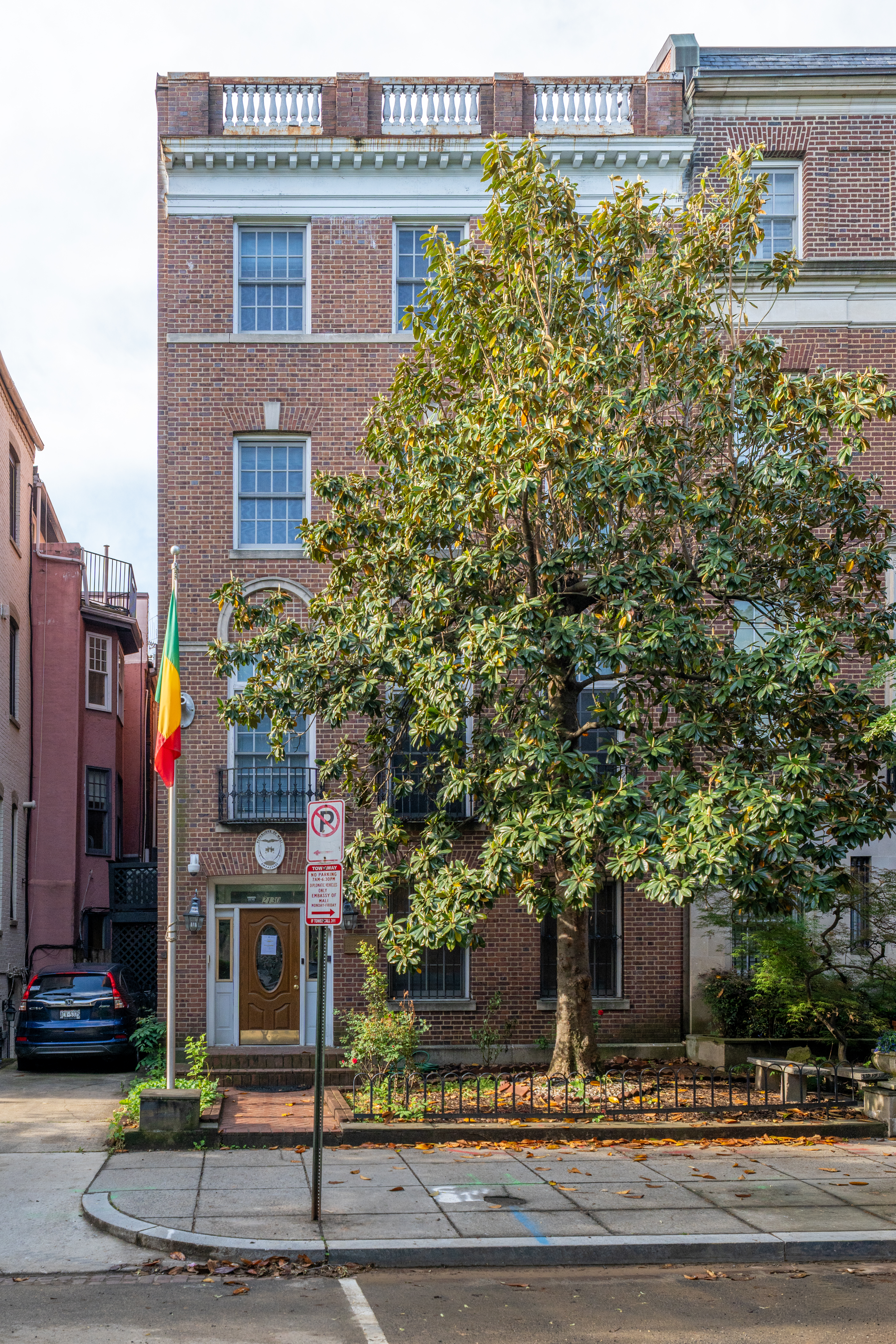
Embassy in Washington, D.C.

== Closed missions ==
=== Africa ===
| Host country | Host city | Mission | Year closed | Ref. |
|---|---|---|---|---|
| Liberia | Monrovia | Embassy | Unknown | |

== See also ==
- Foreign relations of Mali
- List of diplomatic missions in Mali
- Visa policy of Mali
