= Kosovo–Mali relations =

Kosovar–Malian relations
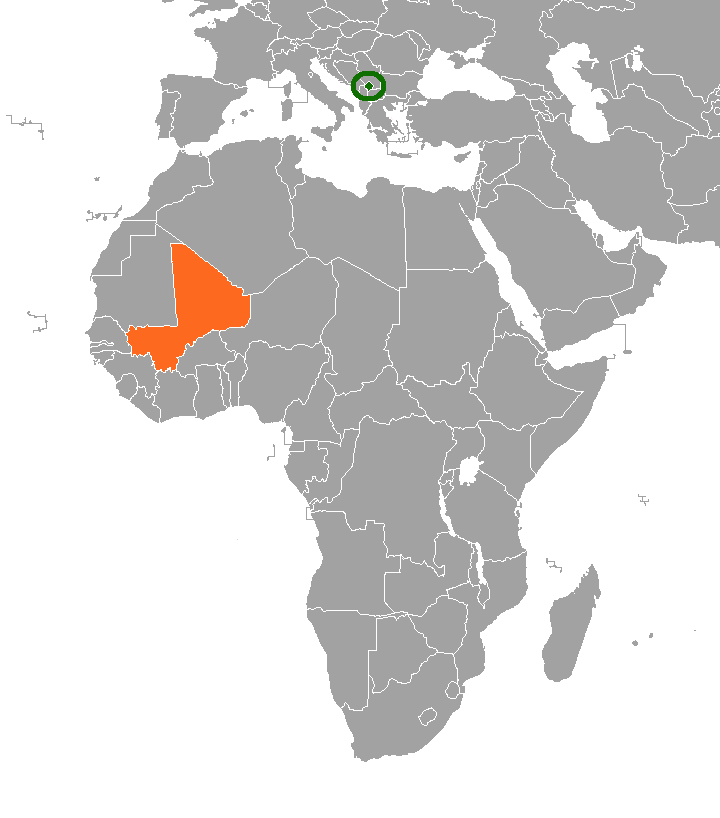
- Kosovo: Mali

Kosovar–Malian relations are foreign relations between Kosovo and Mali. Formal diplomatic relations between two states have not been established as Mali has not recognized Kosovo as a sovereign state.

== History ==
Mali's president Amadou Toumani Touré was reported in the press in March 2008 as having expressed the Malian stance on Kosovo as follows: "International norms must be respected, because their abuse and the violation of territorial integrity could threaten a series of countries with a similar problem".

In a 21 May 2010 meeting with Serbian prime minister, Mirko Cvetković, Mali's Foreign Minister, Moctar Ouane, said that Serbia could count on Mali's support in its efforts to preserve its sovereignty and territorial integrity.

In August 2011 meeting with Kosovo's First deputy prime minister Behgjet Pacolli, Touré is reported to have said that recognition of Kosovo would be seriously considered by Mali.

Following the August 2012 publication of a note verbale recognising Kosovo's independence, purportedly signed by acting President of Mali, Dioncounda Traoré, state run media in Mali issued a statement in which the Presidency of Mali denied recognising Kosovo and claimed that the document was a fabrication. Pacolli claimed that the Malian Army, who had recently seized control of the state in a coup d'état due to dissatisfaction over the governments handling of their own separatist uprising in Azawad, had intervened to reverse the recognition granted by the civilian president. On Pacolli's return to Mali to seek clarification on the issue, state leaders promised to reconfirm their recognition.

== See also ==
- Foreign relations of Kosovo
- Foreign relations of Mali
