= Foreign relations of Mali =

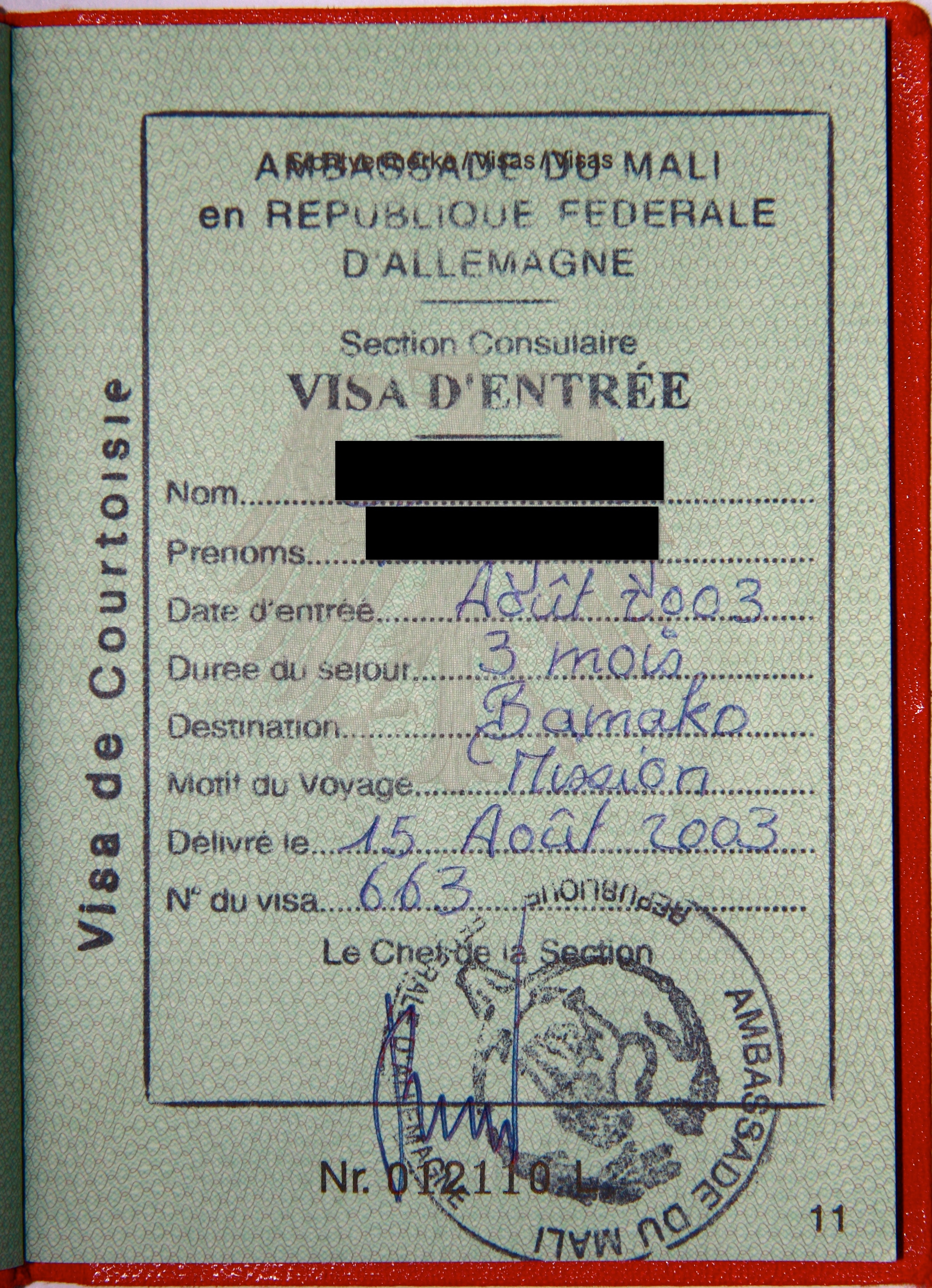
A Malian Visa

Following independence in 1960, Mali initially followed a socialist path and was aligned ideologically with the communist bloc. Mali's foreign policy orientation became increasingly pragmatic and pro-Western over time. Since the institution of a democratic form of government in 1992, Mali's relations with the West in general and the United States in particular have improved significantly. U.S.-Malian relations are described by the U.S. Department of State as "excellent and expanding," especially given Mali's recent record of democratic stability in the volatile area of West Africa and its avowed support of the war on terrorism. Mali is reported to be one of the largest recipients of U.S. aid in Africa.

Mali is active in regional organizations such as the African Union (AU). Working to control and resolve regional conflicts, such as in Ivory Coast, Liberia, and Sierra Leone, is one of Mali's major foreign policy goals. Mali feels threatened by the potential for the spillover of conflicts in neighboring states, and relations with those neighbors are often uneasy. General insecurity along borders in the north, including cross-border banditry and terrorism, remain troubling issues in regional regions.

Although Azawad, a region spanning the expansive north of Mali, was proclaimed independent in April 2012 by Tuareg rebels, Mali has not recognised the de facto state. Britain has closed its embassy; ECOWAS has declared an embargo against Mali, aiming to squeeze out Malian oil supplies; closed Mali's assets in the ECOWAS regional bank and has prepared a potential intervention force of 3,000 troops. France has declared it will assist in a potential intervention.

== Multilateral membership ==
Mali is a member of the United Nations (and many of its specialized agencies), the International Monetary Fund (IMF), the World Bank, the World Trade Organization (WTO), the International Labour Organization (ILO), the International Telecommunication Union (ITU), the Universal Postal Union (UPU) and the International Criminal Court (ICC). It also belongs to the Organisation of African Unity (OAU); Organisation of Islamic Cooperation (OIC); Non-Aligned Movement (NAM); an associate member of the European Community (EC); and African Development Bank (ADB).

Mali is active in regional organizations. It participates in the Economic Community of West African States (ECOWAS) and the West African Economic Monetary Union (UEMOA) for regional economic integration; Liptako–Gourma Authority, which seeks to develop the contiguous areas of Mali, Niger, and Burkina Faso; the Niger River Commission; the Permanent Interstate Committee for drought control in the Sahel (CILSS); and the Senegal River Valley Development Organization (OMVS).

Historically, Mali has used these organizations to leverage the promotion of regional peacekeeping efforts. One of the largest issues facing the country is security threats from extremist groups and consequential political unrest. One of the most prominent examples of this is Mali's former membership the G5 Sahel with the fellow member states Burkina Faso (formerly), Chad, Mauritania, and Niger (formerly). The Sahel was originally formed on 16 February 2014, with the main objective of encouraging security and development. This partnership is historically significant due to the group's shared colonizer, France. In its first year of existence, the organization formed a legal framework for strategic intervention and a secretariat located in Nouakchott, Mauritania. The framework was titled the Development and Security Strategy (SDS). In 2017, the G5 Sahel Joint Force was created and funded through the Priority Investment Program (PIP), aiming to reduce violence and create more stability in the region. In a December 2018 coordination conference, $2.6 billion was pledged from foreign nations including the United States, European Union, Saudi Arabia, and China. American and French financial support is suspected to be, in part, a result of their consequentially lowered troop commitment in the region. This military collective targets organized crime and religious extremists specifically with cross-border operations. In addition to military-centered approaches, Mali and Niger have implemented Disarmament, Demobilization, and Reintegration, or DDR, programs while Mauritania and Burkina Faso have not. DDR is an approach that removes weapons, breaks up crime organizations, and reintegrates combatants into civilian life or state-sanctioned armed forces. Although more costly and time-intensive, DDR has proven to be more sustainable than other stabilization approaches over time. The G5 Sahel has been weakening in the most recent years, with many forces from the European Union pulling their troops to concentrate their efforts on the Russian invasion of Ukraine. However, to compensate, the Sahel member states have reported on plans to expand the size of their force from six to fourteen battalions. Biannual reports from the Sahel have revealed that the efforts have become increasingly dire with high humanitarian needs and large terrorist activity with large resource and land occupation. This eventually lead to its withdrawal on 15 May 2022.

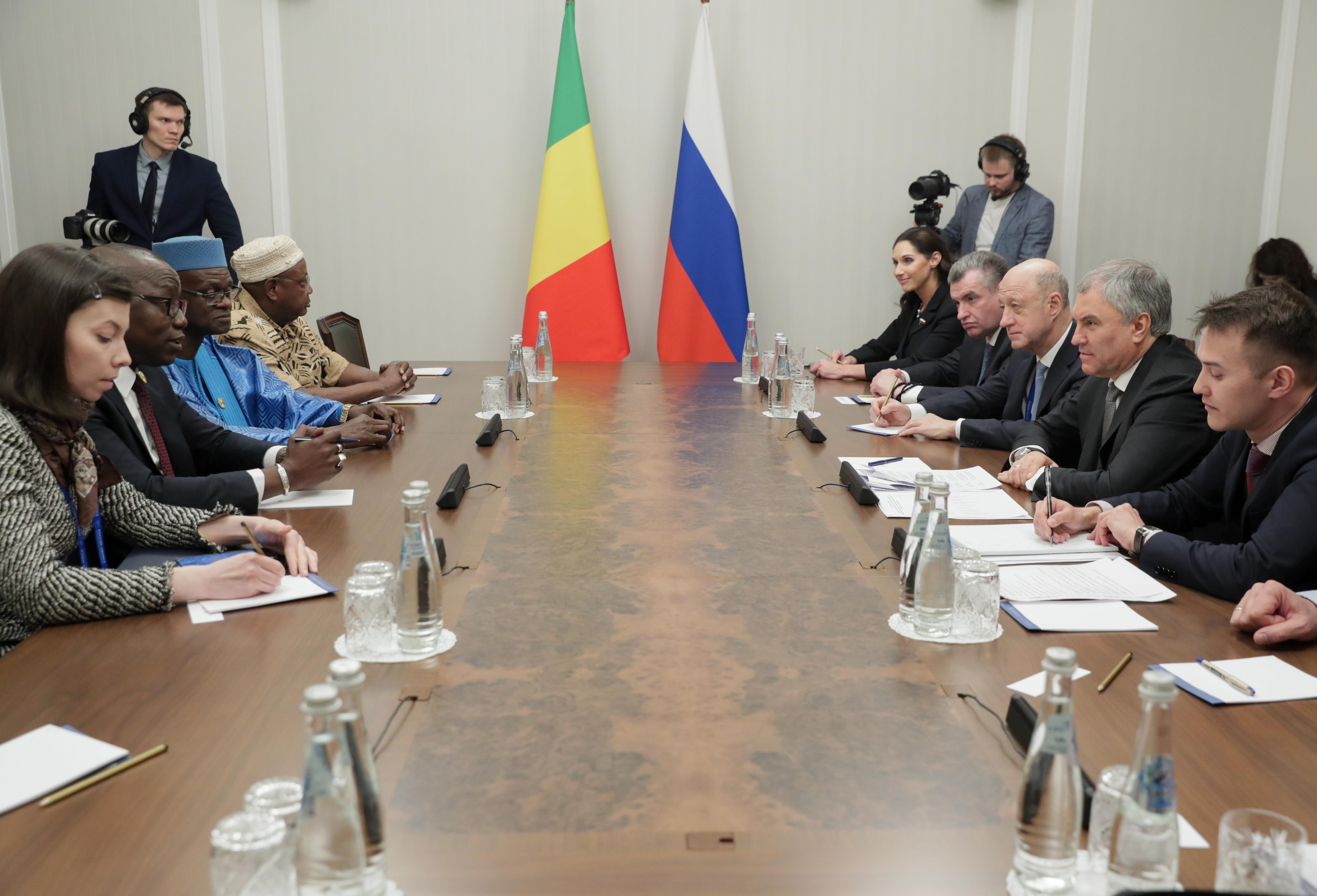
Representatives of Mali and Russia at the 2nd International Parliamentary Conference "Russia-Africa" in Moscow, 19 March 2023

As seen with the G5-Sahel, Mali has not been a particularly active or compliant member of these organizations as a result of their ongoing political unrest. Despite some early successful peacekeeping initiatives by ECOWAS and the AU, their most recent joint policies are facing challenges of limited institutional capacity, low enforcement, and inexplicit language surrounding its implementation. ECOWAS was originally founded to promote economic development across its 15 West African member states, but also works to promote political institutions and stability. Recently, it promised to end the unconstitutional takeover of political power in member states, but Mali has since developed new policies to distance themselves from the organization and limit its reach.

The UN has also attempted many peacekeeping missions focusing on political unrest, economic objectives, and women's rights throughout Mali's history. The most notable effort began with the UN Multidimensional Integrated Stabilization Mission in Mali (MINUSMA) in 2013. In 2022, Mali restricted United Nations peacekeeping operations through their security council and, in June 2023, asked for them to be removed. Although this program is being dissolved, some UN presence will remain in Mali. This effort kept about 15,000 soldiers and police personnel in Mali throughout the project's decade, but has recently been threatened by nearby territorial conflicts. It is also rumored that this removal may be the result of some strategic differences. Since the AU's creation in 2002, there have been some difficulties aligning it with the UN. Generally, the AU prioritizes short-term solutions over long-term, which is opposite to the UN. This disagreement has contributed to arguments about jurisdiction and the correct approach to security efforts.

== Diplomatic relations ==
List of countries which Mali maintains diplomatic relations with:

#	Country	Date
1	France	20 August 1960
2	Germany	23 September 1960
3	United States	24 September 1960
4	Ghana	14 October 1960
5	Liberia	14 October 1960
6	Russia	14 October 1960
7	Czech Republic	17 October 1960
8	Bulgaria	23 October 1960
9	China	25 October 1960
10	Vietnam	31 October 1960
11	Serbia	4 November 1960
—	Israel (suspended)	27 November 1960
12	Romania	1 December 1960
13	Cuba	30 December 1960
14	Egypt	10 January 1961
15	Morocco	10 January 1961
16	Mongolia	25 January 1961
17	Guinea	3 March 1961
18	Hungary	12 March 1961
19	United Kingdom	15 March 1961
20	Burkina Faso	18 March 1961
21	Poland	12 May 1961
22	Switzerland	26 May 1961
23	North Korea	29 August 1961
24	Lebanon	9 October 1961
25	Democratic Republic of the Congo	23 November 1961
26	Japan	18 January 1962
27	Brazil	24 January 1962
28	India	24 January 1962
29	Ivory Coast	16 April 1962
30	Italy	27 April 1962
31	Niger	1 August 1962
32	Nigeria	1 August 1962
33	Sudan	19 August 1962
34	Haiti	21 August 1962
35	Cameroon	13 October 1962
36	Saudi Arabia	1962
37	Sierra Leone	1962
38	Canada	7 January 1963
39	Republic of the Congo	20 February 1963
40	Turkey	17 April 1963
41	Senegal	22 June 1963
42	Kuwait	3 July 1963
43	Algeria	22 July 1963
44	Belgium	1 August 1963
45	Chile	5 September 1963
46	Gabon	30 October 1963
47	Mauritania	1963
48	Pakistan	1963
49	Tunisia	1963
50	Ethiopia	23 March 1964
51	Netherlands	11 July 1964
52	Spain	20 August 1964
53	Argentina	8 September 1964
54	Burundi	4 November 1964
55	Kenya	4 November 1964
56	Uganda	4 November 1964
57	Tanzania	24 November 1964
58	Syria	29 November 1964
59	Sweden	25 January 1965
60	Albania	9 February 1965
61	Indonesia	21 June 1965
62	Benin	27 August 1965
63	Luxembourg	15 December 1965
64	Chad	15 January 1966
65	Central African Republic	1968
66	Cambodia	10 June 1969
67	Togo	1969
68	Austria	21 February 1970
69	Gambia	25 June 1971
70	Libya	17 November 1972
71	Fiji	10 April 1973
72	Iran	12 April 1975
73	Portugal	17 December 1976
74	Venezuela	24 December 1976
75	Greece	1976
76	Laos	2 January 1977
77	Mexico	23 March 1977
78	Bahrain	6 June 1977
79	Norway	17 June 1977
80	Qatar	1977
81	Oman	2 March 1979
82	Yemen	April 1979
—	Holy See	29 October 1979
83	Cape Verde	1979
84	Iraq	5 September 1980
85	Maldives	16 October 1980
86	Malta	8 December 1980
87	Guinea-Bissau	1980
88	United Arab Emirates	18 August 1981
89	Thailand	15 September 1981
90	Bangladesh	30 September 1981
91	Malaysia	21 August 1982
92	New Zealand	6 March 1983
93	Australia	15 March 1984
—	Sovereign Military Order of Malta	1986
94	Rwanda	6 January 1987
95	Zambia	2 October 1987
96	Jordan	25 April 1988
97	Colombia	29 September 1988
98	Singapore	29 August 1989
—	State of Palestine	1989
99	Cyprus	26 January 1990
100	Brunei	1 May 1990
101	South Korea	27 September 1990
102	Kyrgyzstan	5 November 1992
—	Ukraine (severed)	5 November 1992
103	Estonia	13 November 1992
104	Turkmenistan	16 November 1992
105	Kazakhstan	26 November 1992
106	Latvia	26 November 1992
107	Slovenia	3 December 1992
108	Slovakia	12 February 1993
109	Nicaragua	27 July 1993
110	Tajikistan	15 October 1993
111	Belarus	3 November 1993
112	Equatorial Guinea	4 November 1993
113	Armenia	21 February 1994
114	South Africa	6 May 1994
115	Bosnia and Herzegovina	10 December 1994
116	Lithuania	21 November 1995
117	Azerbaijan	26 November 1996
118	Uzbekistan	13 February 1997
119	Peru	16 July 1998
120	Seychelles	April 2001
121	Croatia	13 September 2001
122	Denmark	10 April 2002
123	Angola	28 October 2002
124	Madagascar	1 August 2003
125	Mauritius	1 December 2003
126	Jamaica	17 December 2003
127	Iceland	23 July 2004
128	Moldova	27 September 2004
129	Namibia	27 October 2004
130	Finland	18 August 2005
131	Zimbabwe	23 March 2006
132	Guatemala	7 July 2006
133	Dominican Republic	15 September 2006
134	Botswana	5 June 2007
135	Saint Vincent and the Grenadines	11 June 2007
136	Nepal	19 November 2009
137	Paraguay	25 June 2010
138	Mozambique	13 July 2011
139	Sri Lanka	19 January 2012
140	Monaco	26 January 2012
141	Eritrea	16 February 2012
142	Montenegro	10 May 2012
143	Georgia	31 May 2012
144	Djibouti	12 November 2012
145	El Salvador	23 September 2014
146	Ecuador	17 April 2015
147	Comoros	16 February 2016
148	Barbados	22 July 2021
149	Philippines	24 November 2022
150	Malawi	2 August 2023
151	São Tomé and Príncipe	8 December 2023
152	Saint Lucia	26 June 2024
153	Bolivia	6 December 2024
154	Somalia	19 August 2026
155	Uruguay	Unknown

== Bilateral relations ==
Country	Formal Relations Began	Notes
Algeria	22 July 1963	Both countries established diplomatic relations on 22 July 1963. During the Tuareg rebellion of 2012, the Algerian consulate was seized by at least two people wearing explosives belts. Seven hostages were taken, including the consul. In regards to Azawad's UDI, Algeria's Prime Minister has declared it would never "accept questioning Mali's territorial integrity" Algeria has planned to co-ordinate with MNLA to work towards freeing the hostages.: Algeria has an embassy in Bamako.; Mali has an embassy in Algiers.
Azerbaijan	26 November 1996	Both countries established diplomatic relations on 26 November 1996; The Azerbaijani embassy in Rabat is accredited to Mali.
Belgium	1 August 1963	Both countries established diplomatic relations on 1 August 1963 when M. Gerard Walravens, first Ambassador of Belgium to Mali, resident in Abidjan, presented his letters of credentials to President Modibo Keita.
Benin	27 August 1965	Both countries established diplomatic relations on 27 August 1965 when first ambassador of Mali to Dahomey (resident in Niamey) Mr. Hangadoumbo Toure presented his credentials.
Brazil	24 January 1962	Both countries established diplomatic relations on 24 January 1962.: Brazil has an embassy in Bamako.; Mali has an embassy in Brasília.
Canada	7 January 1963	See Canada–Mali relations Both countries established diplomatic relations on 7 January 1963 Mali established its embassy in Canada in 1978, with its first appointed ambassador Zana Ousmane Dao, while Canada's embassy in Mali has been open since 1995. Canada has moved from Mali's sixth-largest donor of bilateral official development assistance in 2000 to third-largest in 2007. The value of Canada's exports of goods to Mali exceeded imports from Mali by Cdn.$22m. between 1990 and 2008. Natural Resources Canada estimated that Canadian mining investment in Mali reached Cdn.$500 million in 2009, and in 2005, 73 mining concessions were held by Canadian firms in Mali.: Canada has an embassy in Bamako.; Mali has an embassy in Ottawa.
China	25 October 1960	See China–Mali relations China established diplomatic relations with the Republic of Mali on 25 October 1960: China has an embassy in Bamako.; Mali has an embassy in Beijing.
Cuba	30 December 1960	Both countries established diplomatic relations on 30 December 1960: Cuba has an embassy in Bamako.; Mali has an embassy in Havana.
Cyprus	26 January 1990	Both countries established diplomatic relations on 26 January 1990 when first Ambassador of Mali to Cyprus Mr. Sinally Coulibaly presented his credentials
Ethiopia	23 March 1964	Both countries established diplomatic relations on 23 March 1964 when first Ambassador of the Republic of Mali, Mr. Modibo Diallo, has presented his credentials to Emperor Haile Selassie
Finland	18 August 2005	See Finland–Mali relations
France	20 August 1960	Both countries established diplomatic relations on 20 August 1960 Mali has a longstanding relationship with France, its former colonial ruler, but relations have been described as ambivalent rather than close. Mali dropped out of the Franc Zone shortly after independence, not rejoining until 1967. One contentious issue between the two nations is the frequent expulsion of illegal Malian immigrants from France since 1996. However, France has played a significant part in helping Mali via military support in the Northern Mali conflict, with soldiers of the two nations' armies working together to take back territory from the rebels. This military intervention, named Operation Barkhane, had the main objectives of strengthening Mali's armed forces and counterrorism efforts which began in 2013. It was meant to bring stability to the state's institutions but, ultimately, helped to enable the 2020 military-led coup d'état. In 2022, Mali expelled the last 2,400 troops of the advanced French military services due to increased violence and worsening conditions following the 2021 coup. This marked a shift in relations between the two countries but appears to have not threatened other forms of support, such as financial aid. France has historically lent significant funding to Mali, most notably starting in December 2018 during the G-5 Sahel's Joint Force's Priority Investment Program (PIP) conference. This funding was meant to boost security efforts with the G5 Sahel, raising US$2.6 billion in pledges for the region from international donors. Since the dismantling of the Sahel, it is unclear if and how these funds have been distributed. France also donated US$128 million between 2020–2021 to Mali through the Organization for Economic Cooperation and Development's Development Assistance Committee (OECD-DAC).: France has an embassy in Bamako.; Mali has an embassy in Paris.
Gambia	25 June 1971	Both countries established diplomatic relations on 25 June 1971 when Gambia's first Ambassador to Mali, Mr. Samuel Jonathan Okiki Sarr, presented his credentials to the Head of States, Lieut. Traore.
Germany	23 September 1960	See Germany–Mali relations Both countries established diplomatic relations on 23 September 1960: Germany has an embassy in Bamako.; Mali has an embassy in Berlin.
India	24 January 1962	See India–Mali relations Both countries established diplomatic relations on 24 January 1962.: India has an embassy in Bamako.; Mali has an embassy in New Delhi.
Indonesia	21 June 1965	Both countries established diplomatic relations on 21 June 1965 when M. Souraedi Tashi, Indonesia's first Ambassador to Mali, presented his credentials to President Modibo Keita.
Libya	17 November 1972	See Libya-Mali relations Both countries established diplomatic relations on 17 November 1972 when the first Libyan Ambassador to Mali, Muhammad Ahmad Mograhi, presented his credentials to President Mousa Traore.: Libya has an embassy in Bamako.; Mali has an embassy in Tripoli.
Mauritania	1963	See Mali–Mauritania relations Since Mauritania negotiated a boundary dispute with Mali in 1963, ties between the two countries have been mostly cordial. Mali and Mauritania have cooperated on several development projects, such as the OMVS and a plan to improve roads between Nouakchott and Bamako. This cooperation somewhat lessened Mali's dependence on Senegal and Ivory Coast. Although relations were warm with other black African states, since 1965 the orientation of Mauritania's foreign policy has been geared towards relations with North African countries.: Mali has an embassy in Nouakchott.; Mauritania has an embassy in Bamako.
Mexico	23 March 1977	Both countries established diplomatic relations on 23 March 1977: Mali is accredited to Mexico from its embassy in Washington, D.C.; Mexico is accredited to Mali from its embassy in Rabat and has an honorary consulate in Bamako.
Namibia	27 October 2004	Both countries established diplomatic relations on 27 October 2004 when has been accredited non-resident Ambassador of Mali to Namibia Mr. Sinally Coulibaly.
Netherlands	11 July 1964	See Mali–Netherlands relations Both countries established diplomatic relations on 11 July 1964 when has been accredited Ambassador of the Netherlands to Mali with residence in Dakar.
New Zealand	6 March 1983	Both countries established diplomatic relations on 6 March 1983 when first Mali Ambassador to New Zealand (resident in Peking), Mr. Boubacar Toure presented his credentials to the Governor-General
Pakistan	1963	Mali is accredited to Pakistan from its embassy in Riyadh, Saudi Arabia.
Poland	12 May 1961	See Mali–Poland relations: Mali is accredited to Poland from its embassy in Berlin, Germany and maintains an honorary consulate in Warsaw.; Poland is accredited to Mali from its embassy in Dakar, Senegal.
Russia	14 October 1960	See Mali–Russia relations Both countries established diplomatic relations on 14 October 1960: Mali has an embassy in Moscow.; Russia has an embassy in Bamako.
Rwanda	6 January 1987	Both countries established diplomatic relations on 6 January 1987 when ambassador Moktar Kounta El Bakaye presented his credentials to president Juvénal Habyarimana.
South Korea	27 September 1990	Both countries estadlished diplomatic relations on 27 September 1990: Mali is accredited to South Korea from its embassy in Beijing, China.
Spain	20 August 1964	See Mali–Spain relations Both countries established diplomatic relations on 20 August 1964.: Mali has an embassy in Madrid.; Spain has an embassy in Bamako.
Sweden	25 January 1965	Both countries established diplomatic relations on 25 January 1965, when the first Swedish ambassador to Mali with residence in Abidjan, Karl Henrik Anderson, presented his letters of credentials. In 2024, the Swedish government suspended humanitarian aid to Mali due to the pro-Russian policies adopted by the military government of Assimi Goïta. In response, the government of Mali ordered the expulsion of the Swedish ambassador in Bamako.
Turkey	17 April 1963	Mali has an embassy in Ankara.; Turkey has an embassy in Bamako.; Trade volume between the two countries was US$57 million in 2019 (Mali's exports/imports: 8.6/48.4 million USD).
Ukraine	5 November 1992 Diplomatic Relations Severed on 4 August 2024	Both countries established diplomatic relations on 5 November 1992. In August 2024, the Malian military government severed diplomatic relations with Ukraine following the Battle of Tinzaouaten.
United Kingdom	15 March 1961	See Foreign relations of the United Kingdom The UK established diplomatic relations with the United Kingdom on 15 March 1961: Mali does not maintain an embassy in the United Kingdom.; The United Kingdom is accredited to Mali through its embassy in Bamako.; Both countries share common membership of the International Criminal Court, and the World Trade Organization. The UK provides international aid to Mali through the Sahel Region Development Partnership.
United States	24 September 1960	See Mali–United States relations Both countries established diplomatic relations on 24 September 1960 The bilateral agenda is dominated by efforts to increase broad-based growth, improve health and educational facilities, promote the sustainable use of natural resources, reduce the population growth rate, counter the spread of highly infectious diseases, encourage regional stability, build peacekeeping capabilities, institutionalize respect for human rights, and strengthen democratic institutions in offering good governance. Mali currently is a small market for U.S. trade and investment, but there is potential for considerable growth as its economy expands. The majority of Mali-US relations and support is centered around military efforts in the form of intelligence, equipment, and financial aid valuing over $588 million, which began in 2017. From 2020 to 2021, US$205 million was also donated in aid through OECD-DAC. This pledged support was announced as conditional on Mali's ability to uphold elections on an agreed timeframe. Although this election timeframe has not been upheld, USAID is currently giving to the distinct initiatives of Agriculture and Economic Growth, Education, Health, Humanitarian Assistance, Multi-Sectoral Nutrition, and Peace, Democracy, and Governance (PDG) Programs. The most recent coups, expulsion of foreign troops, and rejection of intergovernmental foreign aid has made these programs less stable, but has not slowed donations or halted the US support.: Mali has an embassy in Washington, D.C.; United States has an embassy in Bamako.
Zambia	2 October 1987	Both countries established diplomatic relations on 2 October 1987 when has been accredited Ambassador of Mali to Zambia (resident in Cairo) Elbekaye Moctar Kounta.

== See also ==
- List of diplomatic missions in Mali
- List of diplomatic missions of Mali
