= Azerbaijan–Mali relations =

Bilateral relations between Republic of Azerbaijan and Republic of Mali

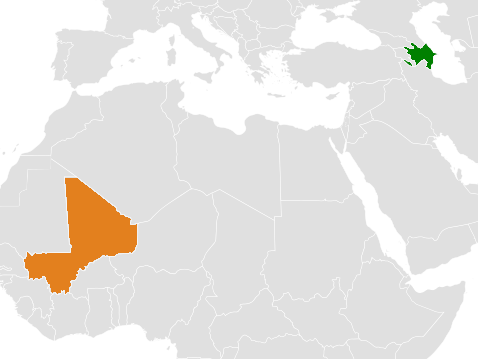
Map highlighting Azerbaijan in green and Mali in orange.

Bilateral relations exist between the Republic of Azerbaijan and the Republic of Mali in the political, socio-economic, cultural and other spheres.

They cooperate in areas such as economy, agriculture, energy, and education.

== Diplomatic relations ==
On November 26, 1996, the Protocol on the establishment of diplomatic relations between Azerbaijan and Mali was signed.

The Ambassador extraordinaire and plenipotentiary of Mali to Azerbaijan is Tiefing Konate.

In accordance with a February 27, 2013 order of President of Azerbaijan Ilham Aliyev, Tariq Aliyev was appointed Ambassador extraordinaire and plenipotentiary of Azerbaijan to Mali.

== High-level visits ==
To participate in the second meeting of the Ministers of Labor of the Organization of Islamic Cooperation member states, held on April 23–26, 2013 in Baku, a delegation led by the Minister of Labor and Vocational Training of Mali Dialo Deydia Mohamane Cattrena visited Azerbaijan.

In May 2017, Malian President Ibrahim Boubacar Keita paid an official visit to Azerbaijan.

== Economic relations ==
According to statistics from the UN Trade Office (COMTRADE), in 2016, the volume of exports of trees, plants, bulbs, roots, cut flowers from Mali amounted to 130 US dollars.

== International cooperation ==
In the international arena, cooperation between the two countries is carried out within the framework of various international organizations: the UN, the OIC, etc.

== See also ==
- Foreign relations of Azerbaijan
- Foreign relations of Mali
