= List of ambassadors of Russia to Burkina Faso =

Ambassador of the Russian Federation to Burkina Faso
- Emblem of the Russian Foreign Ministry
- Incumbent; Igor Martynov since 3 May 2024
- Ministry of Foreign Affairs; Embassy of Russia in Abidjan
- Style: His Excellency; The Honourable
- Reports to: Minister of Foreign Affairs
- Seat: Ouagadougou
- Appointer: President of Russia
- Term length: At the pleasure of the president
- Website: Embassy of Russia in Burkina Faso

The ambassador extraordinary and plenipotentiary of the Russian Federation to Burkina Faso is the official representative of the president and the government of the Russian Federation to the president and the government of Burkina Faso.

The Russian ambassador to Burkina Faso and his staff work at large in the Embassy of Russia in Ouagadougou. The post of Russian ambassador to Burkina Faso is currently held by Igor Martynov, incumbent since 3 May 2024.

== History of diplomatic relations ==
The formal establishment of diplomatic relations between the Soviet Union and what was then the Republic of Upper Volta were established on 18 February 1967. The country was renamed Burkina Faso on 4 August 1984. With the dissolution of the Soviet Union in 1991 the incumbent Soviet ambassador continued as representative of the Russian Federation until 1992, when the embassy in Ouagadougou was closed. With the closing of the embassy, relations were carried out through the Russian embassy in Abidjan, Ivory Coast, with the ambassador to Ivory Coast dually accredited to Burkina Faso. On 28 December 2023, the Russian Embassy in Burkina Faso was reopened with Igor Martynov appointed as the first ambassador solely accredited to the country since 1992.

== List of representatives (1967–present) ==
=== Soviet Union to the Republic of Upper Volta (1967–1984) ===
| Name | Title | Appointment | Termination | Notes |
|---|---|---|---|---|
| Yakov Lazarev | Ambassador | 9 September 1967 | 29 March 1974 | |
| Vadim Tikunov | Ambassador | 29 March 1974 | 28 August 1978 | |
| Arkady Kazansky | Ambassador | 4 October 1978 | 8 August 1981 | |
| Yevgeny Melnikov | Ambassador | 8 August 1981 | 4 August 1984 | |

=== Soviet Union to Burkina Faso (1984–1991) ===
| Name | Title | Appointment | Termination | Notes |
|---|---|---|---|---|
| Yevgeny Melnikov | Ambassador | 4 August 1984 | 9 September 1985 | |
| Feliks Bogdanov | Ambassador | 9 September 1985 | 21 August 1987 | |
| Yevgeny Korendyasov | Ambassador | 21 August 1987 | 25 December 1991 | |

=== Russian Federation to Burkina Faso (1991–present) ===
| Name | Title | Appointment | Termination | Notes |
|---|---|---|---|---|
| Yevgeny Korendyasov | Ambassador | 25 December 1991 | 2 November 1992 | |
| Mikhail Mayorov | Ambassador | 2 November 1992 | 26 June 1995 | Concurrently ambassador to Ivory Coast |
| Georgy Chernovol | Ambassador | 26 June 1995 | 29 March 2000 | Concurrently ambassador to Ivory Coast |
| Aleksandr Trofimov | Ambassador | 29 March 2000 | 8 June 2006 | Concurrently ambassador to Ivory Coast |
| Oleg Kovalchuk | Ambassador | 8 June 2006 | 29 October 2010 | Concurrently ambassador to Ivory Coast |
| Viktor Rogov | Ambassador | 11 February 2011 | 18 January 2016 | Concurrently ambassador to Ivory Coast |
| Vladimir Baykov | Ambassador | 18 January 2016 | 14 July 2022 | Concurrently ambassador to Ivory Coast |
| Aleksei Saltykov | Ambassador | 14 July 2022 | 3 May 2024 | Concurrently ambassador to Ivory Coast |
| Igor Martynov | Ambassador | 3 May 2024 | | |
