= Mali–Russia relations =

- Mali: Russia

Mali–Russia relations are the bilateral relations between Mali and Russia.

== History ==
=== Soviet-era relations (1960–1991) ===
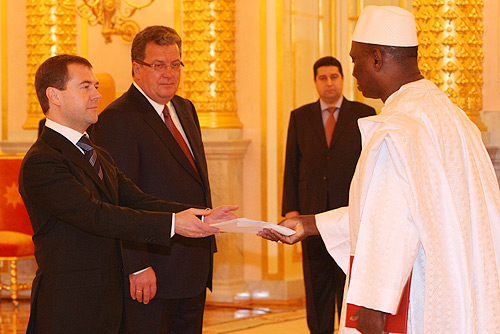
Ambassador Bréhima Coulibaly presenting his letter of credence to President Dmitry Medvedev, 16 January 2009

The Soviet Union recognised the independence of Mali on 7 July 1960, and diplomatic relations between the two states were established on 14 October 1960. Following the collapse of the Mali Federation, and due to French support for Senegal, Modibo Keïta, the first President of Mali, sought closer ties with the Soviet Union. In 1961 the two countries signed trade and cultural pacts, and the Soviet Union granted Mali loans and other aid, which included the acquisition of two Ilyushin Il-18 passenger aircraft for Air Mali. Under the cultural agreement Russia sent circus performers, sports coaches and a soccer team to Mali.

When Keïta was overthrown by Moussa Traoré by a coup d'état in 1968, Traoré improved relations with France and other Western countries, but Mali remained dependent on the Soviet Union for the arming and training of the Malian Armed Forces. Approximately 50 Soviet military advisors provided armour, artillery and parachute training to Mali's military, and trained all of Mali's pilots. The Soviets also improved the Malian Air Force base in Mopti, and occasionally used Malian airfields to stage supply flights for groups it supported in Angola.

On 16 January 1992, Mali recognised the Russian Federation as the successor state of the Soviet Union, after the latter's dissolution.

=== Military rule in Mali (2020–present) ===
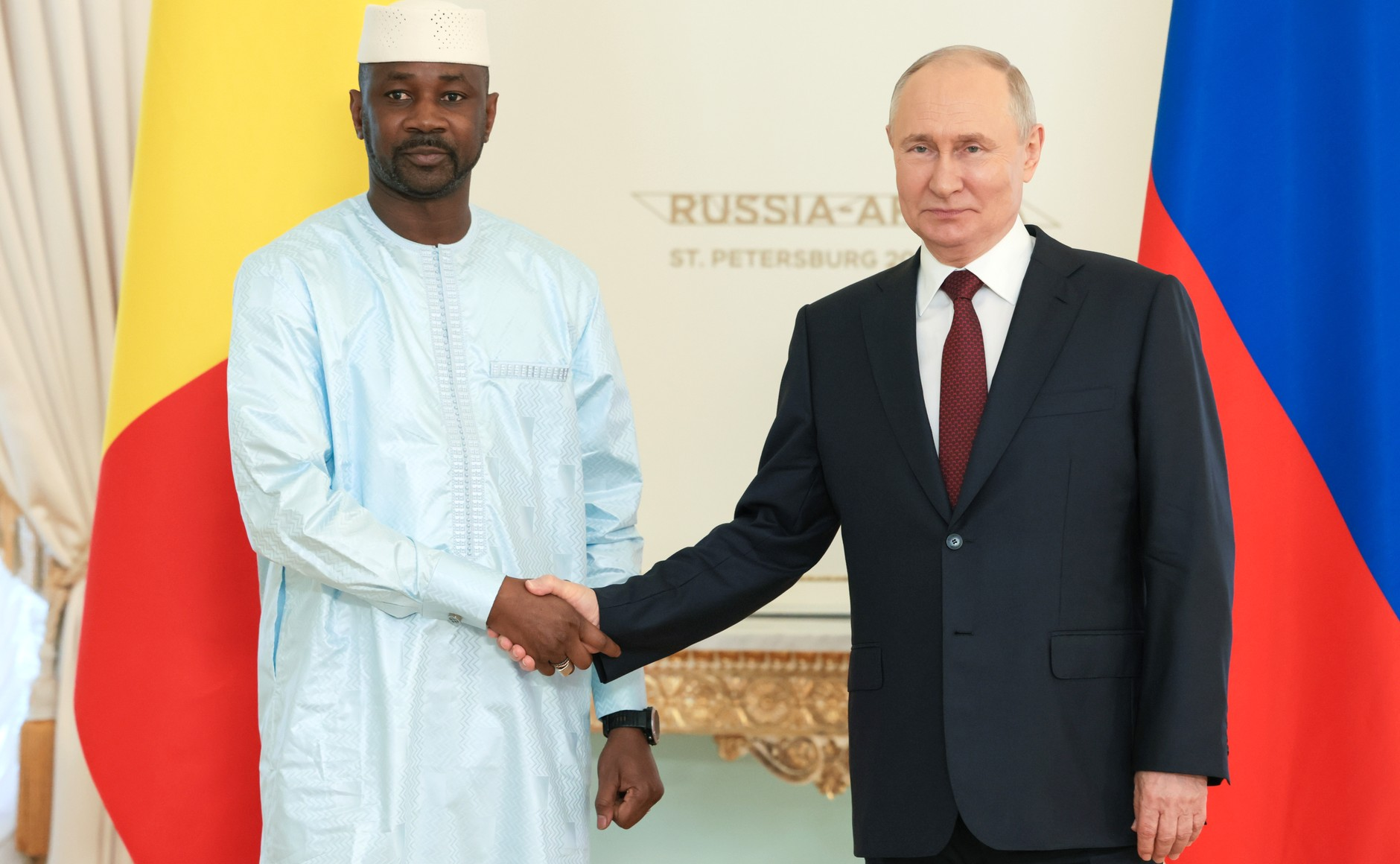
Assimi Goïta with Vladimir Putin in St. Petersburg, Russia, 29 July 2023

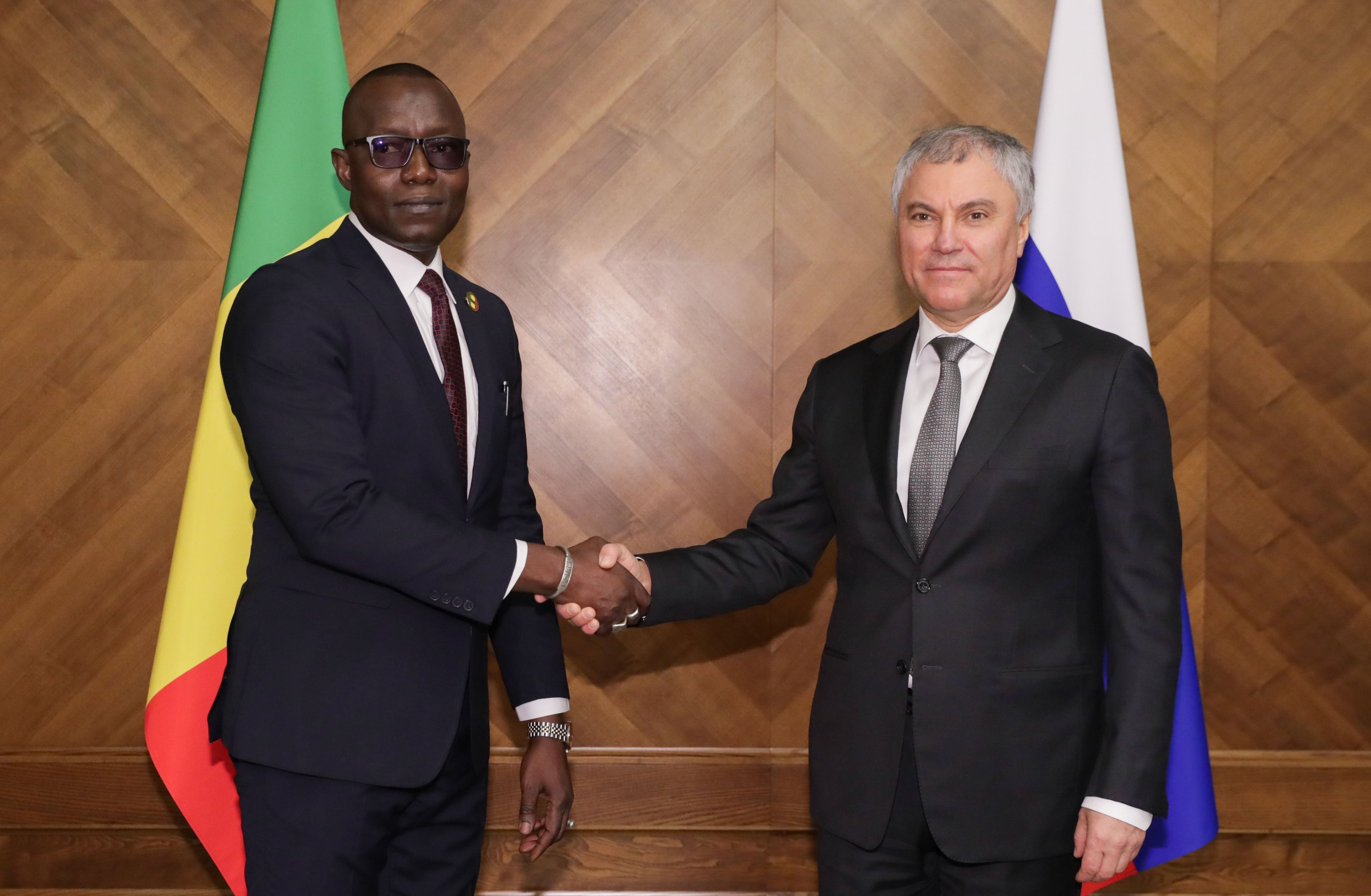
Malick Diaw with Putin's close associate Vyacheslav Volodin in Moscow, Russia, 19 March 2023

In 2020, a coup d'état in Mali deposed President Ibrahim Boubacar Keïta and replaced his government with a junta led by Colonel Assimi Goïta. Russian involvement in the coup has been speculated. The Malian government has increasingly allied with Russia since Goïta assumed direct control in 2021.

Mercenaries from the Russian private military company Wagner Group began arriving in Mali in late 2021, followed by Russian military equipment donations and advisors throughout 2022 and 2023. In November 2022, Minister of Economy and Finance Alousséni Sanou said Russia was committed to send 60,000 tonnes of petroleum products, 30,000 tonnes of fertiliser and 25,000 tonnes of wheat, for a total worth of around $100 million.

In February 2023, Russia's foreign minister Sergey Lavrov met Malian military junta leaders to ensure his country's support to Mali against the Islamist insurgency in the Sahel. Goïta was one of the few heads of state present at the 2023 Russia–Africa Summit.

According to the United States Department of State, the Malian junta is suspected of routing foreign military purchases to Wagner, which were "intended for use in Ukraine" during the ongoing invasion.

On September 27, 2024, Russian Foreign Minister Sergey Lavrov and Foreign Minister of Mali Abdoulaye Diop signed a statement on non-deployment of weapons in space.

== Diplomatic relations ==
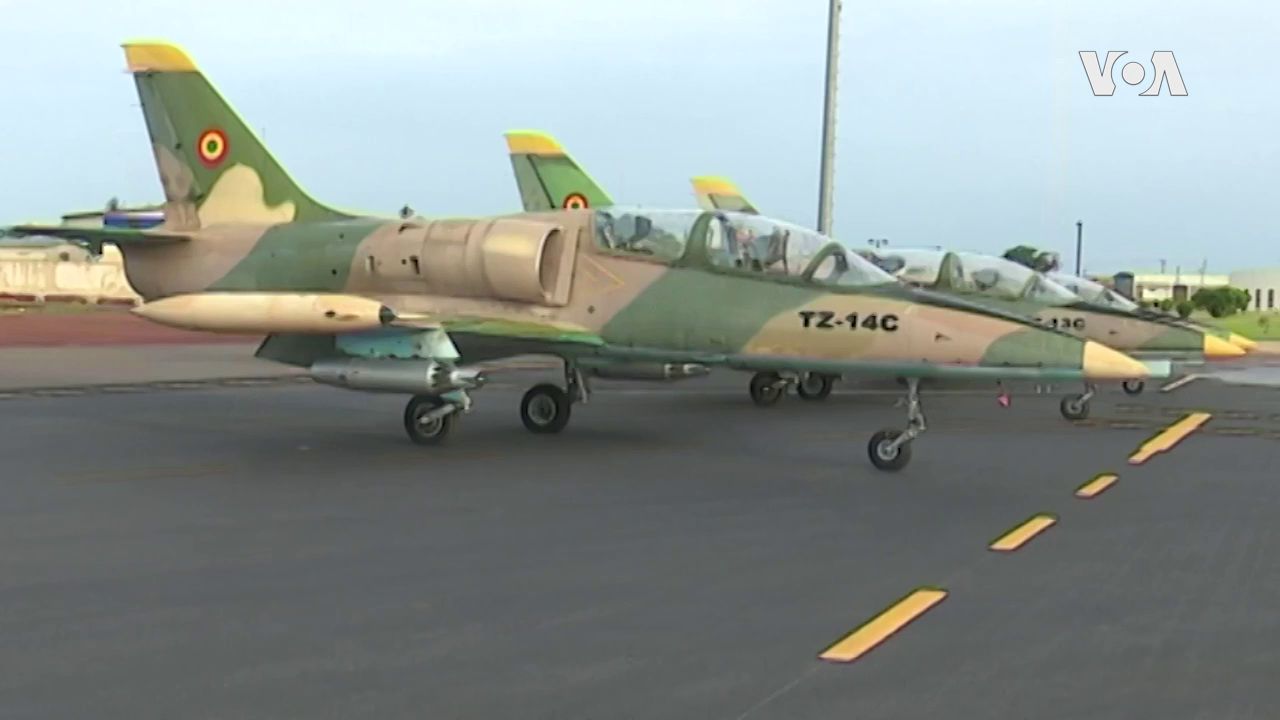
Second-hand Aero L-39 jets donated to Mali by Russia, Bamako airport, 9 August 2022.

In 2003, meetings were held by Alexander Makarenko, Director of the Africa Department of the Russian Ministry of Foreign Affairs, with N. L. Traoré, Secretary General of the Ministry of Foreign Affairs and International Cooperation of Mali. In 2005 Anatoly Safonov, the Special Presidential Representative for International Cooperation in the Fight Against Terrorism and Cross-Border Organized Crime, met from 25 January 2005 through 28 January 2005 in Bamako with his Malian counterpart.

== Diplomatic missions ==
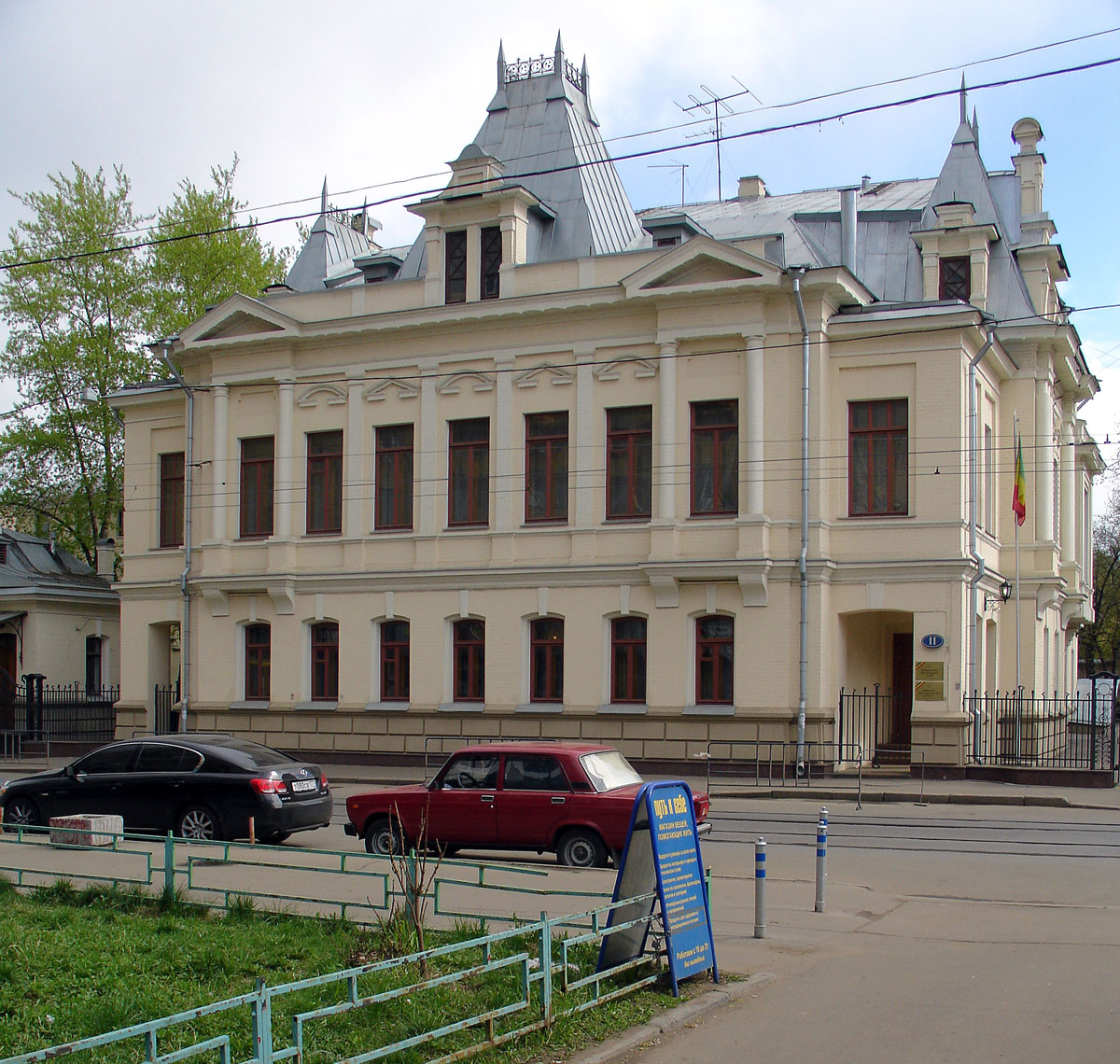
Embassy of Mali, Moscow

Russia has an embassy in Bamako, and Mali has an embassy in Moscow. The current Russian ambassador to Mali is Igor Gromyko, since 17 June 2019. The current Malian ambassador to Russia is Seydou Kamissoko, who was nominated on 24 May 2023.

== See also ==
- Foreign relations of Mali
- Foreign relations of Russia
