= Boris Minakov =

Soviet diplomat (1928–2021)

- Борис Иванович Минаков

Ambassador of the Soviet Union to Ivory Coast
- In office 21 August 1986 – 7 December 1990
- Preceded by: Sergey Petrov
- Succeeded by: Mikhail Mayorov

Personal details
- Born: 15 July 1928 Nizhnedevitsk, Voronezh Oblast, Russian SFSR, Soviet Union
- Died: 11 October 2021 (aged 93)
- Education: Moscow State Institute of International Relations
- Awards: Order of the Badge of Honour

Boris Ivanovich Minakov (Russian: Борис Иванович Минаков; 15 July 1928 – 11 October 2021) was a Soviet diplomat. He served in various diplomatic roles from 1950 onwards, and was ambassador of the Soviet Union to Ivory Coast between 1986 and 1990.

Minakov was born on 15 July 1928 in the village of Nizhnedevitsk, Voronezh Oblast, then part of the Russian Soviet Federative Socialist Republic, in the Soviet Union. He graduated from the Moscow State Institute of International Relations in 1950 and began a long career in the Soviet Ministry of Foreign Affairs. He alternated between positions in the central ministry apparatus with overseas postings, and was minister-counselor in the Soviet embassy in Romania between 1976 and 1981. Minakov became deputy head of the Fifth European Department of the Ministry of Foreign Affairs in 1981, and then in 1986, he became deputy head of the ministry's Office of European Socialist Countries.

On 21 August 1986, Minakov was appointed ambassador of the Soviet Union to Ivory Coast, a post he held until his retirement on 7 December 1990. Minakov was one of a number of retired diplomats to be confirmed as receiving a monthly governmental pension by presidential order dated 8 July 1996.

Minakov died on 11 October 2021 at the age of 93. Over his career he had been awarded the Medal "For Distinguished Labour" in 1966, the Medal "For Labour Valour" in 1971, the Certificate of Honour of the Presidium of the Supreme Soviet of the RSFSR in 1978, the Medal "For Strengthening of Brotherhood in Arms" in 1980, the Medal "Veteran of Labour" in 1985, and the Order of the Badge of Honour in 1988.
