= Mali–Netherlands relations =

- Mali: Netherlands

The Mali–Netherlands relations refers to the current diplomatic and military ties between the Republic of Mali and the Kingdom of the Netherlands.

== Diplomatic missions ==
The Netherlands Embassy is located on Rue 437 Hippodrome, in the capital of Bamako, Mali. The head of the mission is Embassodor Maarten Adriaan Brouwer. Mali holds an honorary consulate in Rotterdam.

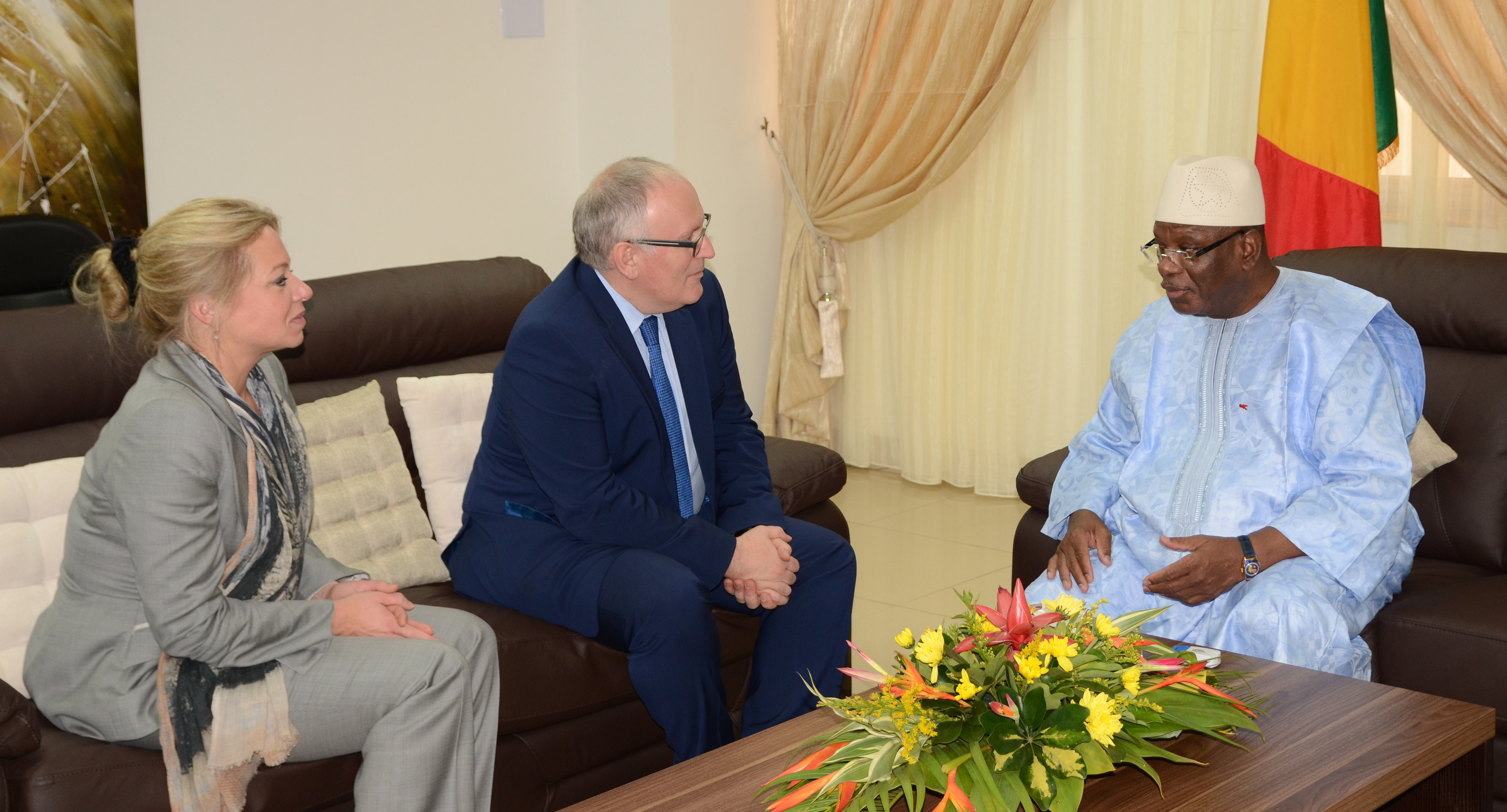
Jeanine Hennis-Plasschaert and then Minister of Foreign Affairs Frans Timmermans with President of Mali Ibrahim Boubacar Keïta on 28 November 2013.

== U.N. mission in Northern Mali ==
The Netherlands have contributed a 450-strong Special Forces and intelligence gathering contingent to serve in the United Nations Multidimensional Integrated Stabilization Mission in Mali. The announcement was made by Foreign Minister Frans Timmermans in July 2014.

The Dutch army contingent was headed by General Tom Middendorp until 2017. Four Dutch peacekeeping troops have been killed and an Apache helicopter lost since 2015.

Dutch servicemen killed:
  - Captain Rene Zeetsen, age 26, (DOD) 17 March 2015, Apache crash 42 km (26 mi) north of Gao
  - First Lieutenant Ernst Mollinger, age 26, (DOD) 17 March 2015, Apache crash 42 km (26 mi) north of Gao
  - Corporal Kevin Roggeveld, age 29, (DOD) 6 July 2016, Explosive mortar round, Kidal
  - Sergeant Henry Hoving, age 24, (DOD) 6 July 2016, Explosive mortar round, Kidal

== Dutch Defense Minister resignation ==
On 4 October 2017, Dutch Minister of Defense, Jeanine Hennis-Plasschaert, resigned over the deaths of two Dutch servicemen and gravely wounding of another in a training accident in Mali in July 2016. The Dutch Safety Board ruled that the military had been using old, defective grenades that had not been tested or stored correctly. General Middendorp also resigned his position due to these failures.

== Trade ==
All imports from Mali to the Netherlands are duty-free and quota-free, with the exception of armaments, as part of the Everything but Arms initiative of the European Union.

== See also ==
- Foreign relations of Mali
- Foreign relations of the Netherlands
