= China–Mali relations =

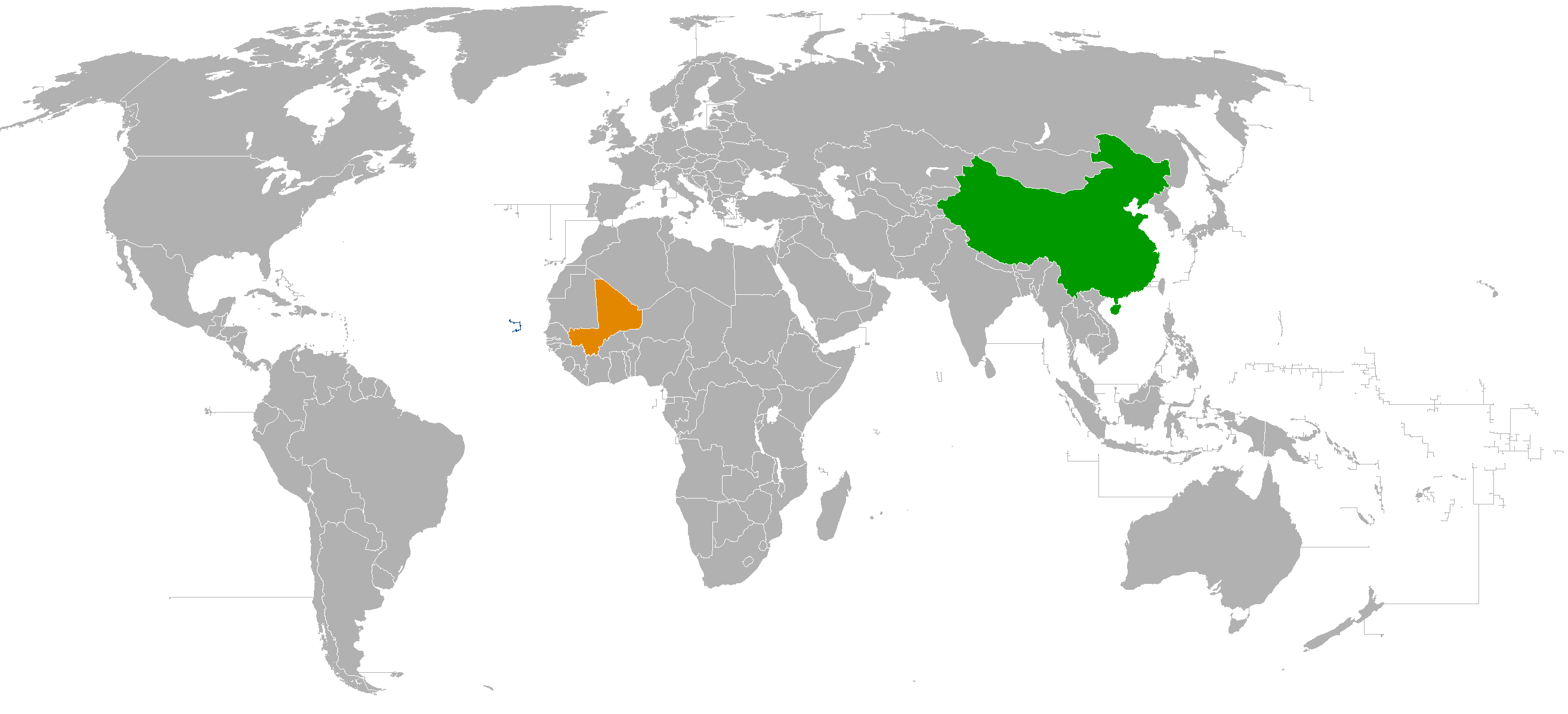
- China: Mali

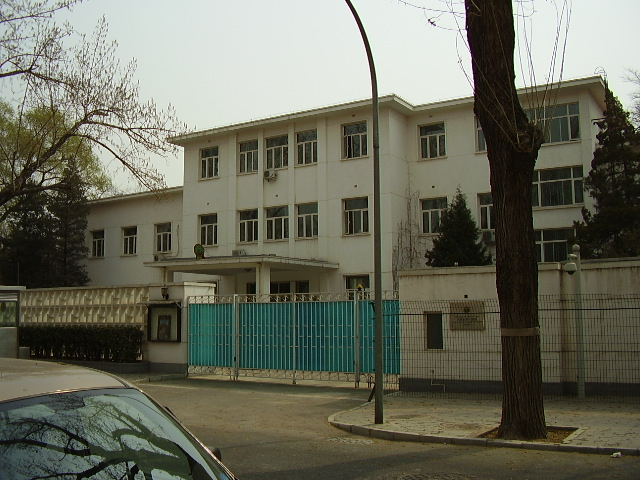
Embassy of Mali in China

China–Mali relations refer to the bilateral relations between China and Mali. The People's Republic of China established diplomatic relations with the Republic of Mali on October 25, 1960.

== History ==
=== Military Relationship ===
China and Mali's relations began after Mali won its independence from France and Modibo Keita, Mali's ruler at the time, was very openly Pro-China. While their diplomatic relations began in 1960, their bilateral military relationship began in 1966 when visits between the defense ministers of each country occurred. Throughout the 1990s and early 2000s, several high - ranking Chinese officers made visits to Mali but it was not until 2013 when this relationship evolved.

After the military coup in 2012, Mali found itself in a vulnerable state as they were struggling with a failing African led international support mission to Mali. China acknowledged the growing threats of terrorism within Mali and decided to support the United Nations effort to introduce MINUSMA by adding troops from their People Liberation Army. This participation in MINUSMA was only the second time that China had deployed troops to participate in the UN's peacekeeping effort, with the first being in South Sudan. Experts argue that part of the reasoning for the PLA's participation was to train Chinese troops in a hostile environment as well as to increase China's military/diplomatic influence throughout Africa.

Initially, 395 personnel consisted of a police unit, engineering unit, medical unit, and a 170 soldier protection unit of the People's Armed Police. PLA operations focused on a range of activities such as military infrastructure, medical care, and combat training. After the death of a PLA soldier during the 2016 terrorist attack of a MINUSMA camp, several PLA operations were limited to the area surrounding their base in Gao. However, the PLA was still able to go about testing new technologies and improving combat.

Chinese private security companies (PSCS) are also present in Mali as part of their military relations. PSCs do not participate in the same type of combat operation that companies from other countries such as Russia do. Many PSCs are operated by PLA members whose purpose is to protect Beijing's economic interests such as Chinese businessmen and infrastructure projects like oil and gas pipelines. Chinese law requires that PSCs be unarmed, therefore, they tend to work mostly in a consulting capacity.

This relationship between these two countries remained strong until the 2020 coup which put the now interim President Assimi Goïta in power. In June 2023, Goïta requested the end of MINUSMA leading to the immediate withdrawal of all troops. China had also voted to end MINUSMA but Beijing released a statement shortly after stating that it would continue to support Mali through both multilateral and bilateral channels. With the withdrawal of troops and the expulsion of Western forces by the new military junta in Mali, China's focus shifted from military and security to an emphasis on creating security through economic developments.

Chinese private security companies (PSCs) are present in Mali for the protection of Beijing's economic interests, but they do not participate in the same type of combat operations that companies from countries such as Russia do, resulting in a negligible gain of military influence.

=== Peacekeepers ===
The United Nations reports that Chinese peacekeeping operations have been relatively positive but there have also been some issues involving the peacekeepers. Chinese peacekeepers have little contact with the local public. In Gao, Chinese peacekeepers are highly equipped with a field hospital containing state of the art kits which receive regular visits from the local people. However, very few peacekeepers speak French, the official language of Mali. This causes a barrier between the peacekeepers and the local community. In 2015, Rwandan troops stationed with the Chinese peacekeepers fired into a crowd during a protest, killing civilians. This created more tension between the local population and China.

== Economic relations ==
From 1979 to 2002, China's involvement in Mali was largely economic with Beijing investing $58 billion into Mali and even after the end of MINUSMA, their economic support continued. Regardless of the current government, China has remained an important trading partner for Mali since the beginning of their bilateral relationship. China has strong beliefs that through economic instruments they can also gain military influence in Mali. Their primary focus on Mali's economy has been on development and trade within the agricultural and energy sectors. In 2022, China's foreign minister, Wang Yi assured Mali's foreign Minister, Abdoulaye Diop of China's commitment in infrastructure, technology and public health initiatives.

China turns to Mali for agricultural products such as sesame seeds, avocados, cashews, and chilis which in turn provides stimulus for Mali's economy. China has also capitalized on some of Mali's natural resources, entering into agreements for the mining and refining of lithium. In 2023, Ganfeng committed to investing $138 million to control the Goulamina project. Ganfeng gains exclusive rights to initial sales, maintaining 70% of sales rights as the project continues as part of the deal. The agreement also opened up discussion on Mali having the ability to sell lithium to China. Trade between the two countries has increased at an annual rate of nearly 13% between 1995 and 2001. It is estimated that China's economic influence over Mali will only continue to increase within the next three years.

From 2000 to 2012, there were approximately 20 Chinese official development finance projects identified in Mali through various media reports. These projects range from loans worth Fr75 billion ($154 million) on preferential rates from China to build the Bamako-Ségou highway in 2010, to a $51.5 million grant to construct the 'Third Bridge' for Mali in Bamako in 2007.

Mali joined joined the Belt and Road Initiative (BRI) in 2019.

== Relationship as of 2024 ==
Mali follows the one China principle. It recognizes the People's Republic of China as the sole government of China and Taiwan as an integral part of China's territory, and supports all efforts by the PRC to "achieve national reunification". It also considers Hong Kong, Xinjiang and Tibet to be China's internal affairs.

On September 2, 2024, General Secretary of the Chinese Communist Party Xi Jinping and Mali's interim President Colonel Assismi Goïta met at the Great Hall of the People for the Beijing Summit of the Forum on China-Africa Cooperation (FOCAC). In this meeting, it was announced that Mali and China's relationship would be elevated to a strategic partnership. China asserted that they were ready to carry forward a traditional relationship with Mali despite the change in regime. They would continue to support each other with China's continued support for Mali's economic development. Xi Jinping also encouraged Chinese companies to continue to invest in Mali while Mali provides security guarantees and policy facilitation in return. Mali appreciates China's contributions to the region and looks forward to a closer multilateral cooperation with China.

== See also ==
- Foreign relations of China
- Foreign relations of Mali
