= Germany–Mali relations =

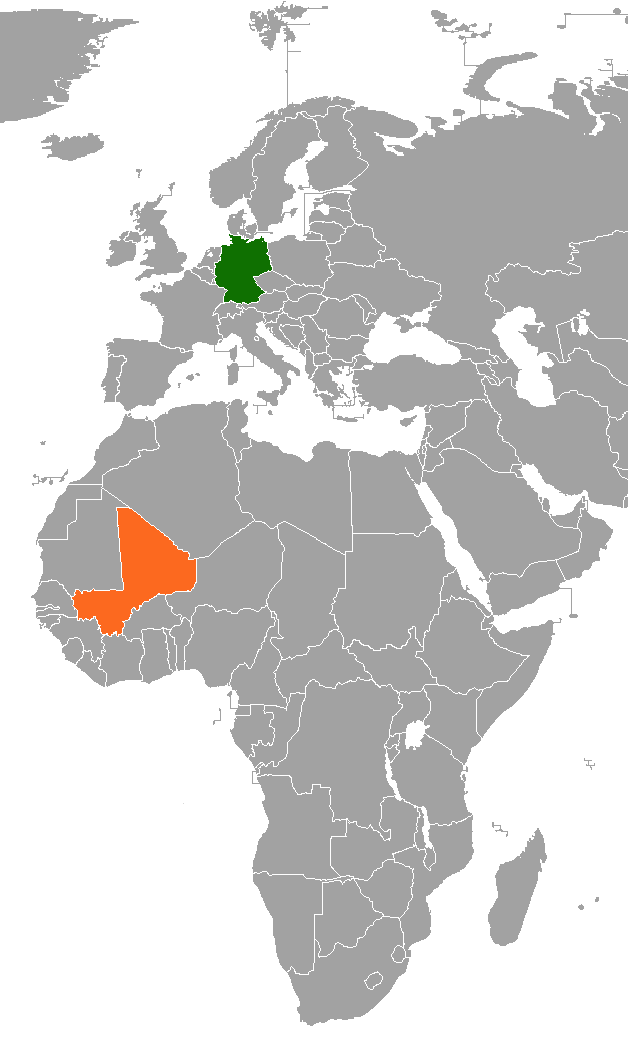

- Germany: Mali

Germany–Mali relations gained depth and intensity in the 2010s as the German government stepped up its efforts to stabilize the Sahel region, and there were an increasing number of bilateral state visits. Germany is also increasingly engaged in security policy in Mali.

== History ==
In the 19th century, German-speaking explorers such as Heinrich Barth and Oskar Lenz travelled to the legendary city of Timbuktu. In 1886, Gottlob Adolf Krause visited Bandiagara in present-day Mali. In 1931, the German pilot Elly Beinhorn had to make an emergency landing between Bamako and Timbuktu. She was then rescued by local Songhai people. In 1944, Malian anti-colonial activist Tiemoko Garan Kouyaté was murdered by the Nazis in the Mauthausen concentration camp after refusing to collaborate with them.

After Mali's independence from France in 1960, the Federal Republic of Germany (FRG) was the first state to recognize the country's independence. After the end of the Hallstein Doctrine, Mali also established diplomatic relations with the German Democratic Republic (GDR) in 1977. A year later, Mali's President Moussa Traoré visited German Chancellor Helmut Schmidt on a state visit to Germany. In 1982, security cooperation began to deepen, and the FRG began to help train Mali's armed forces after a bilateral agreement to that effect was signed.

In 2000, Mali was made a priority country for German development cooperation. Federal President Johannes Rau visited the country two years later. In the 2010s, state visits occur more frequently and Germany increases its engagement in the country. In 2013, the Bundestag sent German soldiers to support the African-led International Support Mission to Mali to help the Malian government fight Islamist rebels in the conflict in northern Mali, which has been ongoing since 2012. Germany increased its participation in the successor United Nations Multidimensional Integrated Stabilization Mission in Mali to up to 650 German soldiers in 2016. The intensification of relations was flanked by visits by Chancellor Angela Merkel to Mali in 2016 and 2019, as well as several visits by Defense Minister Ursula von der Leyen. In return, several top Malian politicians visited Germany.

After the 2021 Malian coup d'état relations between the countries worsened. In November 2022, the withdrawal of German troops in Mali was announced for next year.

== Economic exchange ==
An investment agreement between Mali and the Federal Republic of Germany has existed since 1977. However, due to the difficult framework conditions, there have hardly been any investments by German companies in Mali so far. In 2021, the bilateral trade volume was only 94 million Euro. All imports from Mali to Germany are duty-free and quota-free, with the exception of armaments, as part of the Everything but Arms initiative of the European Union.

== Development cooperation ==
Germany provides development aid in Mali with a focus on governance decentralization, agriculture and water/sanitation. For example, Germany supports projects to increase agricultural productivity and to improve the supply of water to the population.

== Security relations ==
The German Armed Forces are involved in the UN stabilization mission MINUSMA and advise the Malian armed forces as part of the EU training mission EUTM Mali. Germany is also involved in the civilian training mission EUCAP Sahel Mali, which supports and trains Malian security forces. Within the framework of the EU migration partnership with the country, both countries cooperate in the field of migration.

== Cultural relations ==
In 2005, former Malian GDR scholarship holders founded the German-Malian Cultural Circle (CCGM), which holds regular events and gives German courses with the help of the German Embassy in the country. The German Academic Exchange Service is active in the country and nearly 1000 Malians study German as a major.

In 2006, the Malian duo Amadou & Mariam recorded Zeit, dass sich was dreht (Celebrate the Day), the official song for the 2006 World Cup, together with Herbert Grönemeyer.

== Diplomatic locations ==
- Germany has an embassy in Bamako.
- Mali has an embassy in Berlin.

== See also ==
- Foreign relations of Germany
- Foreign relations of Mali
