= Vadim Tikunov =

Soviet politician (1921–1980)

Minister of Internal Affairs
- In office 25 July 1961 – 17 September 1966
- Preceded by: Nikolay Stakhanov

Personal details
- Born: Vadim Stepanovich Tikunov; 9 April 1921 Simbirsk
- Died: 16 July 1980 (aged 59) Yaoundé, Cameroon
- Resting place: Kuntsevo cemetery, Moscow

Vadim Stepanovich Tikunov (Russian: Вадим Степанович Тикунов; 9 April 1921 – 16 July 1980) was a Soviet politician who served as the minister of internal affairs of the Russian Soviet Federative Socialist Republic between 1961 and 1966. He was also ambassador of the Soviet Union to Republic of Upper Volta and Cameroon in the late 1960s and 1970s.

== Biography ==
Tikunov was born in Simbirsk in April 1921. From 1939 he attended Alma Ata State Law Institute, today part of Al-Farabi Kazakh National University, and graduated in 1942. He joined the Communist Party in 1942 and from August 1942 he began to serve as the secretary of the Aktobe regional committee of the Komsomol. In 1944 he became the central committee member of the Komsomol and from 1945 he served as the secretary of the central committee of the Komsomol of the Estonian Soviet Socialist Republic. In 1947 he was appointed the first secretary of the Komsomol's Vladimir Oblast committee. In 1951 he was named as the secretary of the Komsomol committee in Vladimir City and then as the secretary of the regional committee of the Communist Party. In June 1952 he was appointed to its central committee.

From 1956 Tikunov worked at the department of administrative organizations. Between November 1958 and August 1959 he was made the deputy head of the departments. Then he served as the deputy chairman of the KGB from 28 August 1959 to 21 July 1961. He was the minister of internal affairs of the Russian Soviet Federative Socialist Republic in the period between 25 July 1961 and 17 September 1966. He replaced Nikolay Stakhanov in the post who had been removed from the office. During his tenure Tikunov was promoted to the second rank general of internal service on 7 January 1963.

His next post was the commission member of the central committee of the Party on travel abroad which he held in the period 1967–1969. In October 1969 Tikunov was named Minister-Counsellor at the embassy in Romania, a post he held until 1974. He was appointed Soviet ambassador to the Republic of Upper Volta on 21 March 1974, replacing Yakov Lazarev in the post. Tikunov's last post was Soviet ambassador to Cameroon to which he was appointed on 28 August 1978.

Tikunov died on 16 July 1980 while serving as the Soviet ambassador in Yaoundé, Cameroon, and was buried in Moscow at the Kuntsevo cemetery.
