= List of ambassadors of Russia to Ivory Coast =

Ambassador of the Russian Federation to the Republic of Côte d'Ivoire
- Emblem of the Russian Foreign Ministry
- Incumbent; Aleksei Saltykov since 14 July 2022
- Ministry of Foreign Affairs; Embassy of Russia in Abidjan
- Style: His Excellency; The Honourable
- Reports to: Minister of Foreign Affairs
- Seat: Abidjan
- Appointer: President of Russia
- Term length: At the pleasure of the president
- Website: Embassy of Russia in Ivory Coast

The ambassador extraordinary and plenipotentiary of the Russian Federation to the Republic of Côte d'Ivoire is the official representative of the president and the government of the Russian Federation to the president and the government of Ivory Coast.

The Russian ambassador and his staff work at large in the Embassy of Russia in Abidjan. The post of Russian ambassador to Ivory Coast is currently held by Aleksei Saltykov, incumbent since 14 July 2022. With the closure of the embassy in Ouagadougou in neighbouring Burkina Faso in 1992, the ambassador to Ivory Coast was given dual accreditation as the ambassador to Burkina Faso, until the reopening of the embassy in Ouagadougou in 2023 and the appointment of an ambassador to Burkina Faso the following year.

== History of diplomatic relations ==
Diplomatic relations between the Soviet Union and Ivory Coast were established on 18 February 1967. The first ambassador, Sergey Petrov, was appointed on 7 September 1967 and presented his credentials on 13 November 1967. At the behest of the Ivorian government, diplomatic relations were severed in 1969 and the ambassadors were withdrawn. Diplomatic relations were restored on 21 August 1986, and Boris Minakov was appointed as ambassador. With the dissolution of the Soviet Union in 1991 the incumbent Soviet ambassador, Mikhail Mayorov, continued as representative of the Russian Federation until 1995. With the closure of the embassy of Ouagadougou in Burkina Faso in 1992, the ambassador to Ivory Coast was also accredited as the non-resident ambassador to Burkina Faso, until the reopening of the embassy in Burkina Faso in 2023 and the appointment of an ambassador in 2024.

== List of representatives (1967–present) ==
=== Soviet Union to Ivory Coast (1967–1991) ===
Name	Title	Appointment	Termination	Notes
Sergey Petrov	Ambassador	7 September 1967	30 May 1969	
Diplomatic relations interrupted (1969 - 1986)
Boris Minakov	Ambassador	21 August 1986	7 December 1990	
Mikhail Mayorov	Ambassador	7 December 1990	25 December 1991	

=== Russian Federation to Ivory Coast (1991–present) ===
Name	Title	Appointment	Termination	Notes
Mikhail Mayorov	Ambassador	25 December 1991	26 June 1995	Concurrently ambassador to Burkina Faso after 2 November 1992
Georgy Chernovol	Ambassador	26 June 1995	29 March 2000	Concurrently ambassador to Burkina Faso
Aleksandr Trofimov	Ambassador	29 March 2000	8 June 2006	Concurrently ambassador to Burkina Faso
Oleg Kovalchuk	Ambassador	8 June 2006	29 October 2010	Concurrently ambassador to Burkina Faso
Viktor Rogov	Ambassador	11 February 2011	18 January 2016	Concurrently ambassador to Burkina Faso
Vladimir Baykov	Ambassador	18 January 2016	14 July 2022	Concurrently ambassador to Burkina Faso
Aleksei Saltykov	Ambassador	14 July 2022		Concurrently ambassador to Burkina Faso until 3 May 2024
