= List of ambassadors of Russia to Niger =

Ambassador of the Russian Federation to the Republic of the Niger
- Emblem of the Russian Foreign Ministry
- Incumbent; Viktor Voropayev since 20 August 2025
- Ministry of Foreign Affairs; Embassy of Russia in Niamey
- Style: His Excellency; The Honourable
- Reports to: Minister of Foreign Affairs
- Seat: Niamey
- Appointer: President of Russia
- Term length: At the pleasure of the president
- Website: Embassy of Russia in Niger

The ambassador of Russia to Niger is the official representative of the president and the government of the Russian Federation to the president and the government of Niger.

The ambassador and his staff work at large in the Russian embassy in Niamey. The current Russian ambassador to Niger is Viktor Voropayev, incumbent since 20 August 2025.

== History of diplomatic relations ==
Formal diplomatic relations between Niger and the Soviet Union were established on 17 February 1972. Gennady Sokolov was appointed as the first ambassador on 13 June 1972. With the dissolution of the Soviet Union in 1991, Niger recognised the Russian Federation as its successor state. The incumbent Soviet ambassador, Valeriyonas Baltrunas, continued as ambassador from Russia until 1992. The embassy in Niamey was closed in 1992 as part of cost-saving measures, and the ambassador to Mali was thereafter given dual accreditation as the non-resident ambassador to Niger. This practice came to an end with the reopening of the embassy in Niamey, and the appointment of Viktor Voropayev as the ambassador to Niger in 2025.

== List of representatives of Russia to Niger (1960 –present) ==
=== Soviet Union to Niger (1960 – 1991) ===
| Name | Title | Appointment | Termination | Notes |
|---|---|---|---|---|
| Gennady Sokolov | Ambassador | 13 June 1972 | 22 August 1978 | Credentials presented on 6 October 1972 |
| Vladimir Kudashkin | Ambassador | 22 August 1978 | 30 June 1988 | Credentials presented on 14 October 1978 |
| Vitaly Litvin | Ambassador | 30 June 1988 | 18 March 1991 | |
| Valeriyonas Baltrunas | Ambassador | 18 March 1991 | 25 December 1991 | |

=== Russian Federation to Niger (1991–present) ===
| Name | Title | Appointment | Termination | Notes |
|---|---|---|---|---|
| Valeriyonas Baltrunas | Ambassador | 25 December 1991 | 22 April 1992 | |
| Pavel Petrovsky | Ambassador | 7 August 1992 | 1 July 1996 | Concurrently ambassador to Mali |
| Yevgeny Korendyasov | Ambassador | 1 July 1996 | 24 November 2000 | Concurrently ambassador to Mali |
| Anatoly Klimenko | Ambassador | 30 November 2000 | 3 August 2005 | Concurrently ambassador to Mali |
| Anatoly Smirnov | Ambassador | 3 August 2005 | 14 July 2010 | Concurrently ambassador to Mali |
| Aleksey Dulyan | Ambassador | 14 July 2010 | 17 June 2019 | Concurrently ambassador to Mali; Credentials presented on 12 October 2010 |
| Igor Gromyko | Ambassador | 28 August 2019 | 20 August 2025 | Concurrently ambassador to Mali; Credentials presented on 23 December 2019 |
| Viktor Voropayev | Ambassador | 20 August 2025 | | |
