= Mali–Spain relations =

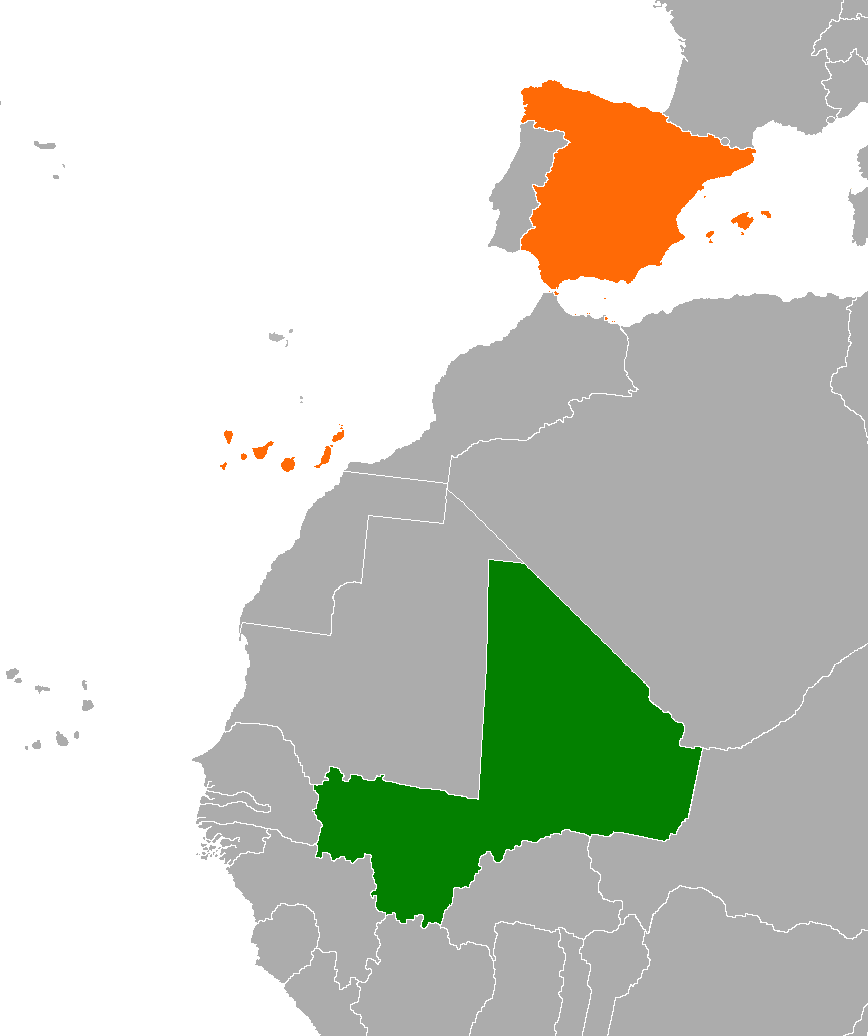
- Mali: Spain

Mali and Spain have maintained diplomatic relations since 2006. Mali has an embassy in Madrid, and honorary consulates in Barcelona and Santa Cruz de Tenerife. The diplomatic representation of the Republic of Mali in Spain was opened at the beginning of 2011, not only in order to strengthen ties between Mali and Spain, but also to guarantee a service to Malian citizens living in Spain. Spain has an embassy in Bamako.

== Diplomatic relations ==
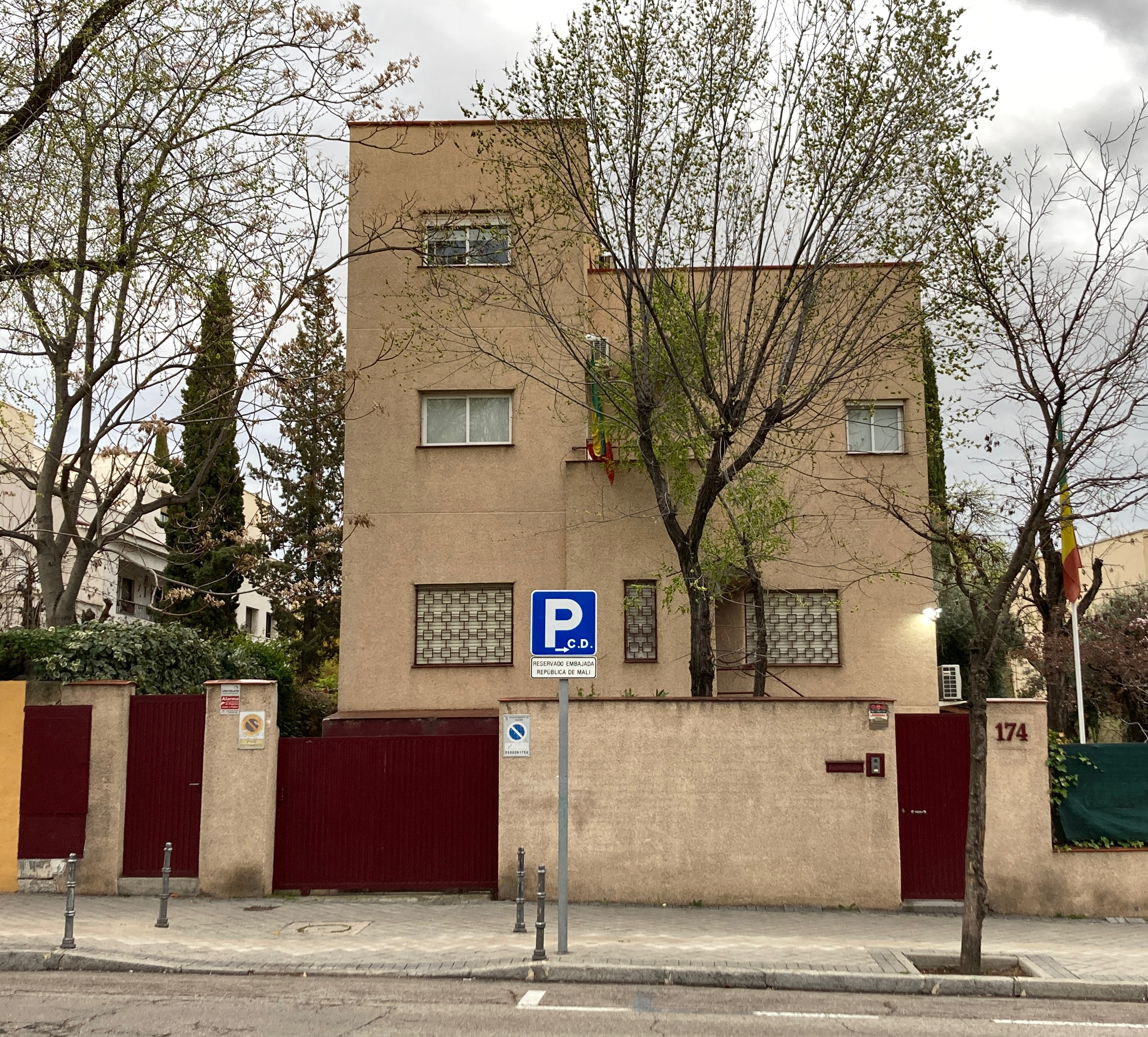
Mali Embassy in Madrid, Serrano Street 174.

The Embassy of Spain in Mali began its activities in July 2006, and the Technical Cooperation Office in January 2008. The inauguration of the Embassy took place on January 26, 2008, in the framework of the MAEC tour of 5 countries of sub-Saharan Africa.

Bilateral relations have been developing rapidly, based on an intense exchange of high-level visits. Spain and Mali share strategic interests, among others, the fight against poverty, the fight against organized crime and terrorism, and the shared management of migration flows under a comprehensive and global approach.

As part of the growing momentum of bilateral relations, the Mali Council of Ministers made the decision to open the Embassy in Madrid on July 29, 2009. The extraordinary and plenipotentiary ambassador of the Republic of Mali in Spain was appointed on April 14, 2010.

== Economic relations ==
The current political and security volatility in Mali, as well as the fact that the country is in a situation of warlike conflict, mean that in the short term the country's legal and economic framework is not the most adequate for the promotion of Spanish investments . However, within the business opportunities, the Mali authorities have expressed in the past interest in developing bilateral cooperation in a number of areas through investments of Spanish companies in the primary sector, infrastructure, banking, telecommunications and tourism. Also noteworthy is the fact that a window of opportunity for Spanish companies is within the framework of the European Union tenders, with EDF financing or other instruments and which are especially relevant in the field of infrastructure.

All imports from Mali to Spain are duty-free and quota-free, with the exception of armaments, as part of the Everything but Arms initiative of the European Union.

== Cooperation ==
Mali is incorporated as a priority country for Spanish Cooperation in the Annual Plan for International Cooperation 2006. In 2007, a Cooperation Agreement is signed and in 2008 the 1st Joint Commission is signed and the Technical Cooperation Office opens in Bamako. The III Master Plan 2009-2012 consolidated the long-term commitment of the Spanish Cooperation with the development of Mali as a country of Broad Association, the highest category that has been ratified with the approval of the recent IV Master Plan 2013–2016.

== See also ==
- Foreign relations of Mali
- Foreign relations of Spain
