= Igor Gromyko =

Russian diplomat (born 1958)

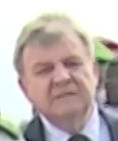
Igor Gromyko

Igor Anatolyevich Gromyko (Russian: И́горь Анато́льевич Громы́ко; born 25 June 1954) is a Russian diplomat.

== Career ==
Since June 17, 2019, he had been the Russian ambassador to Mali. From August 28, 2019 to August 20, 2025 he was the ambassador to Niger, on a part-time basis.

== Awards ==
- Medal of the Order "For Merit to the Fatherland" II degree (July 17, 2019) - for a great contribution to the implementation of the foreign policy course of the Russian Federation and many years of conscientious service.
- Order of Friendship (November 21, 2024) - for a great contribution to the implementation of the foreign policy of the Russian Federation and many years of conscientious diplomatic service.
