= List of ambassadors of Russia to Mali =

Ambassador of the Russian Federation to the Republic of Mali
- Emblem of the Russian Foreign Ministry

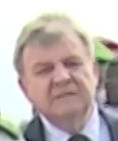
- Incumbent; Igor Gromyko since 17 June 2019
- Ministry of Foreign Affairs; Embassy of Russia in Bamako
- Style: His Excellency; The Honourable
- Reports to: Minister of Foreign Affairs
- Seat: Bamako
- Appointer: President of Russia
- Term length: At the pleasure of the president
- Website: Embassy of Russia in Mali

The ambassador of Russia to Mali is the official representative of the president and the government of the Russian Federation to the president and the government of Mali.

The ambassador and his staff work at large in the Russian embassy in Bamako. The current Russian ambassador to Mali is Igor Gromyko, incumbent since 17 June 2019.

== History of diplomatic relations ==
Formal diplomatic relations between Mali and the Soviet Union were established on 14 October 1960. Aleksandr Loshchakov was appointed as the first ambassador on 17 December 1960. With the dissolution of the Soviet Union in 1991, Mali recognised the Russian Federation as its successor state on 16 January 1992. The incumbent Soviet ambassador, Aleksandr Trofimov, continued as ambassador from Russia until 1992.

Diplomatic relations between Russia and Niger were established in 1972, and Gennady Sokolov was appointed the first ambassador on 13 June 1972. The embassy in Niamey was closed in 1992 as part of cost-saving measures, and the ambassador to Mali was thereafter given dual accreditation as the non-resident ambassador to Niger. This practice came to an end with the reopening of the embassy in Niamey, and the appointment of Viktor Voropayev as the ambassador to Niger in 2025.

== List of representatives of Russia to Mali (1960 –present) ==
=== Soviet Union to Mali (1960 – 1991) ===
Name	Title	Appointment	Termination	Notes
Aleksandr Loshchakov	Ambassador	17 December 1960	26 December 1962	Credentials presented on 26 January 1961
Ivan Melnik	Ambassador	26 December 1962	28 December 1965	Credentials presented on 25 February 1963
Leonid Musatov	Ambassador	28 December 1965	6 May 1970	Credentials presented on 26 February 1966
Vladimir Yukhin	Ambassador	6 May 1970	31 August 1974	Credentials presented on 3 July 1970
Yury Zolotov	Ambassador	31 August 1974	10 August 1975	Credentials presented on 4 October 1974; Died in post
Malik Fazylov	Ambassador	7 July 1976	23 December 1983	Credentials presented on 13 August 1976
Yevgeny Nersesov	Ambassador	24 December 1983	11 December 1987	Credentials presented on 15 March 1984
Aleksandr Trofimov	Ambassador	11 December 1987	25 December 1991	

=== Russian Federation to Mali (1991–present) ===
Name	Title	Appointment	Termination	Notes
Aleksandr Trofimov	Ambassador	25 December 1991	22 April 1992	
Pavel Petrovsky	Ambassador	22 April 1992	1 July 1996	
Yevgeny Korendyasov	Ambassador	1 July 1996	24 November 2000	
Anatoly Klimenko	Ambassador	24 November 2000	3 August 2005	
Anatoly Smirnov	Ambassador	3 August 2005	14 July 2010	
Aleksey Dulyan	Ambassador	14 July 2010	17 June 2019	Credentials presented on 17 September 2010
Igor Gromyko	Ambassador	17 June 2019		Credentials presented on 8 August 2019
