= Aleksandr Trofimov (diplomat) =

Soviet and Russian diplomat

- Александр Трофимов

Ambassador of Russia to Ivory Coast
- In office 29 March 2000 – 8 June 2006
- Preceded by: Georgy Chernovol
- Succeeded by: Oleg Kovalchuk

Ambassador of Russia to Estonia
- In office 1 September 1992 – 23 July 1997
- Preceded by: Aleksandr Kuznetsov
- Succeeded by: Aleksei Glukhov

Ambassador of the Soviet Union/Russia to Mali
- In office 11 December 1987 – 22 April 1992
- Preceded by: Yevgeny Nersesov
- Succeeded by: Pavel Petrovsky

Personal details
- Born: 27 April 1937 (age 89)
- Education: Moscow State Institute of International Relations; Higher Diplomatic School of the Soviet Ministry of Foreign Affairs
- Awards: Order of the Cross of Terra Mariana First Class

Aleksandr Mikhailovich Trofimov (Russian: Александр Михайлович Трофимов; born 27 April 1937) is a former Soviet and Russian diplomat. He served in various diplomatic roles from 1960 onwards, and was Ambassador of Russia to Estonia between 1992 and 1997.

== Career ==
Trofimov was born on 27 April 1937. He graduated from Moscow State Institute of International Relations in 1960 and began his career with the Soviet Ministry of Foreign Affairs. His work took him to various overseas postings, as well as positions within the ministry's central apparatus. In 1972 he graduated from the Higher Diplomatic School of the Soviet Ministry of Foreign Affairs. In 1987 he was appointed Ambassador of the Soviet Union to Mali, a post he held during and after the dissolution of the Soviet Union in late 1991, after which he represented the Russian Federation to Mali, until 1992.

Trofimov was then appointed Ambassador of Russia to Estonia in 1992, serving until his recall in 1997. On his return to Russia he became deputy director of the Second European Department of the Russian Ministry of Foreign Affairs in 1998, before being appointed Ambassador of Russia to Ivory Coast in April 2000, with dual accreditation to Burkina Faso. He was recalled on 8 June 2006.

Trofimov has the diplomatic rank of Ambassador Extraordinary and Plenipotentiary, and is fluent in French, English and Turkish. He is married, with a son and a daughter. He was awarded the Order of the Cross of Terra Mariana, I class, by the Estonian state.
