= Mali–Poland relations =

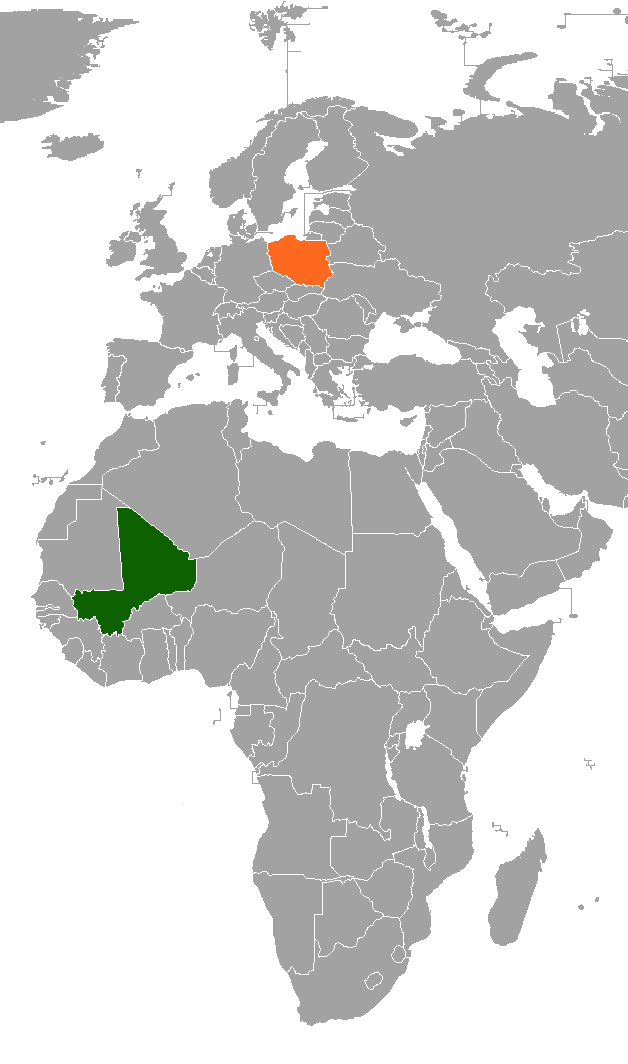
- Mali: Poland

Poland recognized Mali in 1960, shortly after the Malian declaration of independence, and afterwards the countries established bilateral relations. They signed a cultural cooperation agreement in 1961.

In 1999, Malian President Alpha Oumar Konaré paid an official visit to Poland.

== Trade ==
All imports from Mali to Poland are duty-free and quota-free, with the exception of armaments, as part of the Everything but Arms initiative of the European Union.

== Diplomatic missions ==
- Mali is accredited to Poland from its embassy in Berlin, and there is an honorary consulate of Mali in Warsaw.
- Poland is accredited to Mali from its embassy in Dakar.
