= Libya–Mali relations =

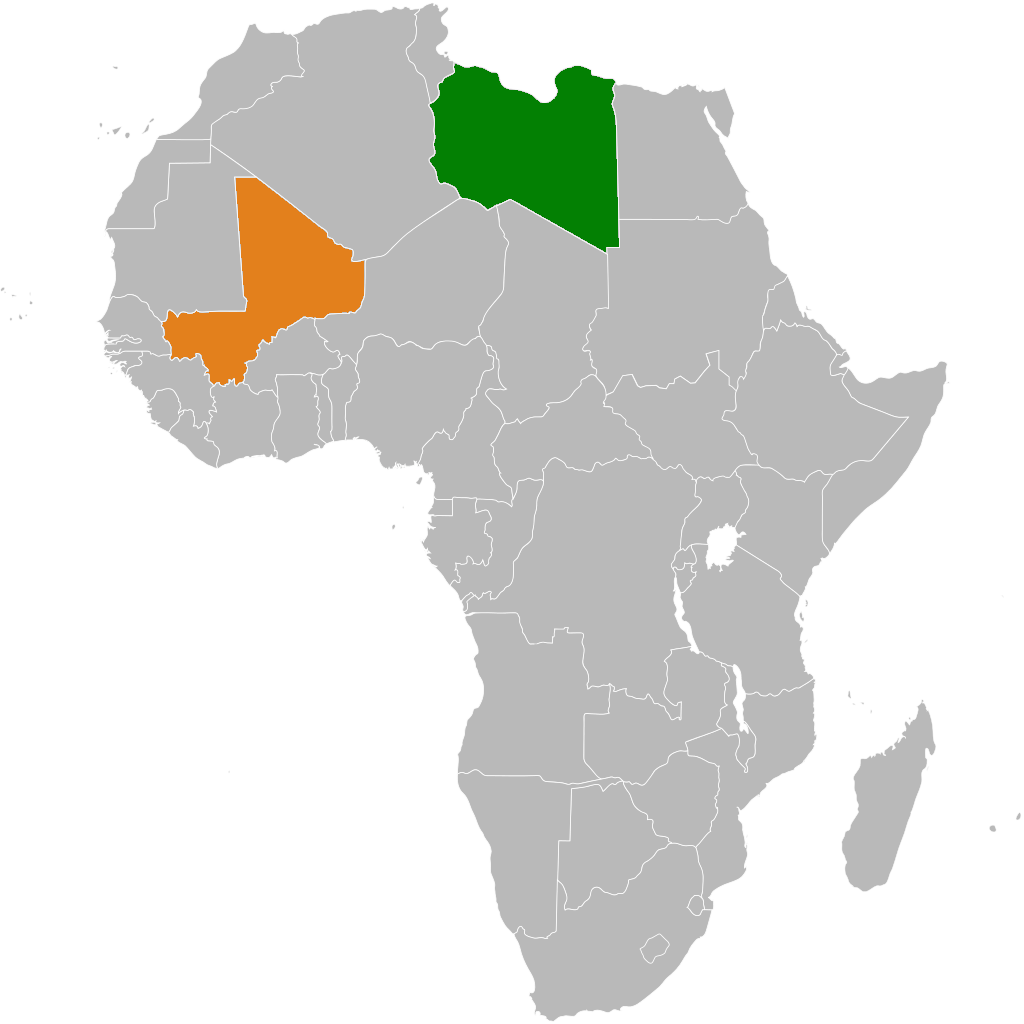

- Libya: Mali

Libya–Mali relations are the bilateral relations between Libya and Republic of Mali. The two countries are members of the African Union, Group of 77 and the United Nations.

== History ==
Both countries established diplomatic relations on 17 November 1972 when the first Libyan Ambassador to Mali, Muhammad Ahmad Mograhi, presented his credentials to President Mousa Traore.

In the aftermath of the Libyan civil war, Malian troops engaged in sporadic battles with Tuareg ex-mercenaries returning from fighting on Gaddafi's side. Authorities in Mali recognised the danger as early as October 2011.

After the death of Muammar Gaddafi, Malian President Amadou Toumani Touré said he accepted the NTC's authority and, together with Algerian President Abdelaziz Bouteflika, expressed his hopes for "a rapid settlement of the crisis in this country, in line with the aspirations of the Libyan people". In January 2012, Mali became the first African nation to agree to accept prisoners convicted by the International Criminal Court, which wants to try Saif al-Islam Gaddafi and several other former Libyan regime officials being held by ex-revolutionary groups in Libya.

The unilaterally declared secession of Azawad from Mali, the military victory of the National Movement for the Liberation of Azawad, Ansar Dine, and other rebel groups in the vast Malian north, and the coup against President Amadou Toumani Touré in 2012 were attributed in part to the outflow of weapons from Libya after the war, which purportedly increased instability in the Sahel.

Libya lost ownership of a hotel in Bamako in November 2025, following irregularities in the management of its renovation project.

== Resident diplomatic missions ==
- Libya has an embassy in Bamako.
- Mali has an embassy in Tripoli.
