= List of diplomatic missions in Mali =

This is a list of diplomatic missions in Mali. At present, the capital city of Bamako hosts 37 embassies. Several other countries have ambassadors accredited to Mali, with most being resident in Dakar.

Honorary consulates are omitted from this listing.

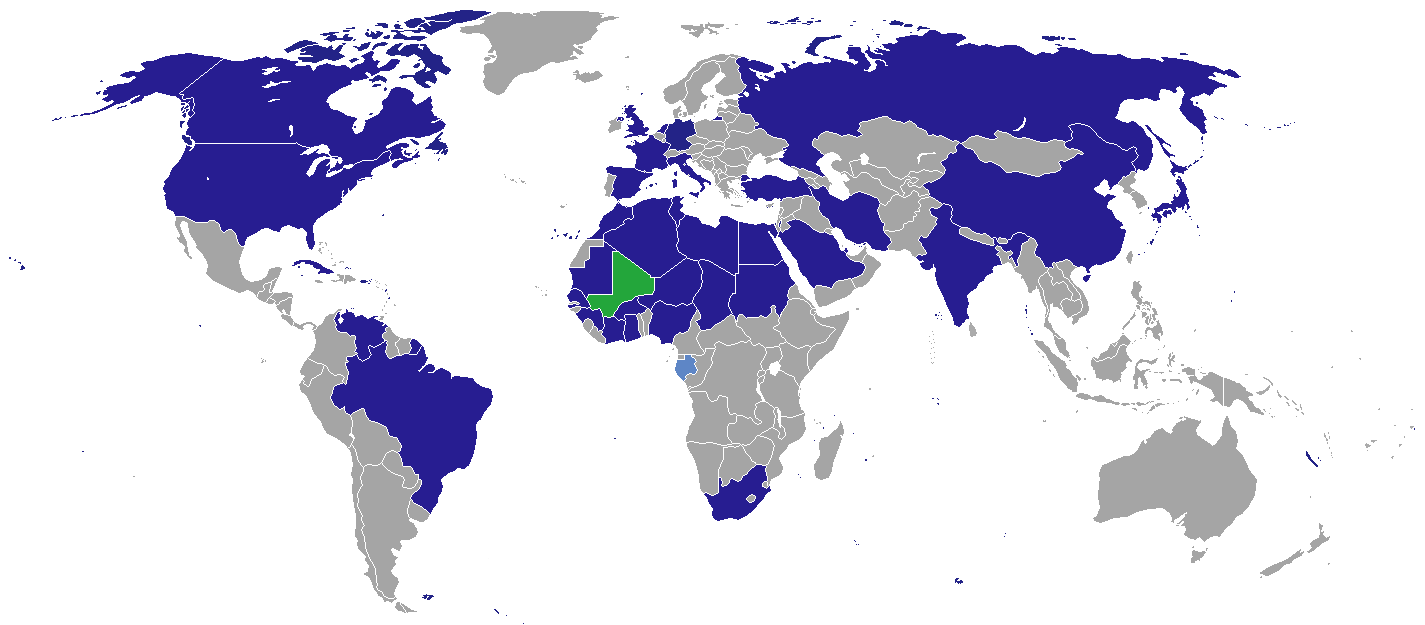
Map of diplomatic missions in Mali

== Diplomatic missions in Bamako ==
=== Embassies ===
1. Algeria
2. Brazil
3. Burkina Faso
4. Canada
5. Chad
6. China
7. Cuba
8. Egypt
9. France
10. Germany
11. Ghana
12. Guinea
13. India
14. Iran
15. Italy
16. Ivory Coast
17. Japan
18. Libya
19. Mauritania
20. Morocco
21. Netherlands
22. Niger
23. Nigeria
24. Palestine
25. Qatar
26. Russia
27. Saudi Arabia
28. Senegal
29. South Africa
30. Sovereign Military Order of Malta
31. Spain
32. Sudan
33. Tunisia
34. Turkey
35. United Kingdom
36. United States
37. Venezuela

=== Other missions or delegations ===
- European Union (Delegation)
- Gabon (Consulate-General)

== Consulate General in Ségou ==
- Burkina Faso

== Non-resident embassies ==
- Argentina (Abuja)
- Australia (Accra)
- Austria (Dakar)
- Azerbaijan (Rabat)
- Bahrain (Algiers)
- Bangladesh (Algiers)
- Brunei (Cairo)
- Bulgaria (Algiers)
- Cameroon (Dakar)
- Central African Republic (Abidjan)
- Chile (Rabat)
- Colombia (Dakar)
- Costa Rica (Paris)
- Croatia (Rabat)
- Cyprus (Cairo)
- Dominican Republic (Rabat)
- Greece (Dakar)
- Guinea-Bissau (Conakry)
- Haiti (Paris)
- Indonesia (Dakar)
- Iraq (Algiers)
- Ireland (Dakar)
- Jordan (Algiers)
- Kenya (Dakar)
- Kuwait (Algiers)
- Kyrgyzstan (Riyadh)
- Malaysia (Dakar)
- Maldives (London)
- Malta (Valletta)
- Mauritius (Cairo)
- Mexico (Rabat)
- Nepal (Cairo)
- New Zealand (Cairo)
- Norway (Dakar)
- Oman (Algiers)
- Panama (Paris)
- Peru (Algiers)
- Philippines (Rabat)
- Poland (Dakar)
- Portugal (Dakar)
- Romania (Dakar)
- Serbia (Algiers)
- Seychelles (Addis Ababa)
- Sierra Leone (Conakry)
- Slovakia (Abuja)
- South Korea (Dakar)
- South Sudan (Abuja)
- Switzerland (Dakar)
- Syria (Algiers)
- Tanzania (Abuja)
- Thailand (Dakar)
- Togo (Ouagadougou)
- Turkmenistan (Paris)
- United Arab Emirates (Algiers)
- Vietnam (Algiers)
- Yemen (Algiers)
- Zambia (Accra)
- Zimbabwe (Accra)

== Closed missions ==
Host city	Sending country	Mission	Сlosed date	Ref.
Bamako	Belgium	Embassy	30 June 2026	
Bamako	Czech Republic	Embassy	31 December 2022	
Bamako	Denmark	Embassy	2025	
Bamako	Luxembourg	Embassy	2025	
Bamako	Norway	Embassy	31 December 2023	
Bamako	Sweden	Embassy	31 December 2024	
Bamako	North Vietnam	Embassy	1972	
