= Lists of ambassadors of Russia =

List of ambassadors of Russia may refer to:

- List of ambassadors of Russia to Abkhazia
- List of ambassadors of Russia and the Soviet Union to Afghanistan
- List of ambassadors of Russia to Albania
- List of ambassadors of Russia to Algeria
- List of ambassadors of Russia to Angola
- List of ambassadors of Russia to Antigua and Barbuda
- List of ambassadors of Russia to Argentina
- List of ambassadors of Russia to Armenia
- List of ambassadors of Russia to Australia
- List of ambassadors of Russia to Austria
- List of ambassadors of Russia to Azerbaijan
- List of ambassadors of Russia to Bahrain
- List of ambassadors of Russia to Bangladesh
- List of ambassadors of Russia to Belarus
- List of ambassadors of Russia to Belgium
- List of ambassadors of Russia to Belize
- List of ambassadors of Russia to Benin
- List of ambassadors of Russia to Bolivia
- List of ambassadors of Russia to Bosnia and Herzegovina
- List of ambassadors of Russia to Botswana
- List of ambassadors of Russia to Brazil
- List of ambassadors of Russia to Brunei
- List of ambassadors of Russia to Bulgaria
- List of ambassadors of Russia to Burkina Faso
- List of ambassadors of Russia to Burundi
- List of ambassadors of Russia to Cambodia
- List of ambassadors of Russia to Cameroon
- List of ambassadors of Russia to Canada
- List of ambassadors of Russia to Cape Verde
- List of ambassadors of Russia to the Central African Republic
- List of ambassadors of Russia to Chad
- List of ambassadors of Russia to Chile
- List of ambassadors of Russia to China
- List of ambassadors of Russia to Colombia
- List of ambassadors of Russia to the Comoros
- List of ambassadors of Russia to the Republic of the Congo
- List of ambassadors of Russia to Costa Rica
- List of ambassadors of Russia to Croatia
- List of ambassadors of Russia to Cuba
- List of ambassadors of Russia to Cyprus
- List of ambassadors of Russia to the Czech Republic
- List of ambassadors of Russia to the Democratic Republic of the Congo
- List of ambassadors of Russia to Denmark
- List of ambassadors of Russia to Djibouti
- List of ambassadors of Russia to the Dominican Republic
- List of ambassadors of Russia to Ecuador
- List of ambassadors of Russia to Egypt
- List of ambassadors of Russia to Equatorial Guinea
- List of ambassadors of Russia to Eritrea
- List of ambassadors of Russia to Estonia
- List of ambassadors of Russia to Ethiopia
- List of ambassadors of Russia to Finland
- List of ambassadors of Russia to France
- List of ambassadors of Russia to Gabon
- List of ambassadors of Russia to Georgia
- List of ambassadors of Russia to Germany
- List of ambassadors of Russia to Ghana
- List of ambassadors of Russia to Greece
- List of ambassadors of Russia to Grenada
- List of ambassadors of Russia to Guatemala
- List of ambassadors of Russia to Guinea
- List of ambassadors of Russia to Guinea-Bissau
- List of ambassadors of Russia to Guyana
- List of ambassadors of Russia to Hungary
- List of ambassadors of Russia to Iceland
- List of ambassadors of Russia to India
- List of ambassadors of Russia to Indonesia
- List of ambassadors of Russia to Iran
- List of ambassadors of Russia to Iraq
- List of ambassadors of Russia to Ireland
- List of ambassadors of Russia to Israel
- List of ambassadors of Russia to Italy
- List of ambassadors of Russia to Ivory Coast
- List of ambassadors of Russia to Jamaica
- List of ambassadors of Russia to Japan
- List of ambassadors of Russia to Jordan
- List of ambassadors of Russia to Kazakhstan
- List of ambassadors of Russia to Kenya
- List of ambassadors of Russia to Kuwait
- List of ambassadors of Russia to Kyrgyzstan
- List of ambassadors of Russia to Latvia
- List of ambassadors of Russia to Laos
- List of ambassadors of Russia to Lebanon
- List of ambassadors of Russia to Lesotho
- List of ambassadors of Russia to Liberia
- List of ambassadors of Russia to Libya
- List of ambassadors of Russia to Lithuania
- List of ambassadors of Russia to Luxembourg
- List of ambassadors of Russia to Madagascar
- List of ambassadors of Russia to Malaysia
- List of ambassadors of Russia to Mali
- List of ambassadors of Russia to Malta
- List of ambassadors of Russia to Mauritania
- List of ambassadors of Russia to Mauritius
- List of ambassadors of Russia to Mexico
- List of ambassadors of Russia to Mongolia
- List of ambassadors of Russia to Montenegro
- List of ambassadors of Russia to Morocco
- List of ambassadors of Russia to Mozambique
- List of ambassadors of Russia to Myanmar
- List of ambassadors of Russia to Namibia
- List of ambassadors of Russia to Nepal
- List of ambassadors of Russia to the Netherlands
- List of ambassadors of Russia to New Zealand
- List of ambassadors of Russia to Nicaragua
- List of ambassadors of Russia to Niger
- List of ambassadors of Russia to Nigeria
- List of ambassadors of Russia to North Korea
- List of ambassadors of Russia to North Macedonia
- List of ambassadors of Russia to Norway
- List of ambassadors of Russia to Oman
- List of ambassadors of Russia to Pakistan
- List of ambassadors of Russia to Panama
- List of ambassadors of Russia to Papua New Guinea
- List of ambassadors of Russia to Paraguay
- List of ambassadors of Russia to Peru
- List of ambassadors of Russia to the Philippines
- List of ambassadors of Russia to Poland
- List of ambassadors of Russia to Portugal
- List of ambassadors of Russia to Qatar
- List of ambassadors of Russia to Romania
- List of ambassadors of Russia to Rwanda
- List of ambassadors of Russia to São Tomé and Príncipe
- List of Ambassadors of Russia to Saudi Arabia
- List of ambassadors of Russia to Senegal
- List of ambassadors of Russia to Serbia
- List of ambassadors of Russia to Seychelles
- List of ambassadors of Russia to Sierra Leone
- List of ambassadors of Russia to Singapore
- List of ambassadors of Russia to Slovakia
- List of ambassadors of Russia to Slovenia
- List of ambassadors of Russia to Somalia
- List of ambassadors of Russia to South Africa
- List of ambassadors of Russia to South Korea
- List of ambassadors of Russia to South Sudan
- List of ambassadors of Russia to Spain
- List of ambassadors of Russia to Sri Lanka
- List of ambassadors of Russia to Sudan
- List of ambassadors of Russia to Suriname
- List of ambassadors of Russia to Sweden
- List of ambassadors of Russia to Switzerland
- List of ambassadors of Russia to Syria
- List of ambassadors of Russia to Tajikistan
- List of ambassadors of Russia to Tanzania
- List of ambassadors of Russia to Thailand
- List of ambassadors of Russia to Togo
- List of ambassadors of Russia to Trinidad and Tobago
- List of ambassadors of Russia to Tunisia
- List of ambassadors of Russia to Turkey
- List of ambassadors of Russia to Turkmenistan
- List of ambassadors of Russia to the Holy See
- List of ambassadors of Russia to Uganda
- List of ambassadors of Russia to Ukraine
- List of ambassadors of Russia to the United Arab Emirates
- List of ambassadors of Russia to the United Kingdom
- List of ambassadors of Russia to the United States
- List of ambassadors of Russia to Uruguay
- List of ambassadors of Russia to Uzbekistan
- List of ambassadors of Russia to Vanuatu
- List of ambassadors of Russia to Venezuela
- List of ambassadors of Russia to Vietnam
- List of ambassadors of Russia to Yemen
- List of ambassadors of Russia to Yugoslavia
- List of ambassadors of Russia to Zambia
- List of ambassadors of Russia to Zimbabwe
