= List of ambassadors from Russia =

Diplomatic representatives of Russia

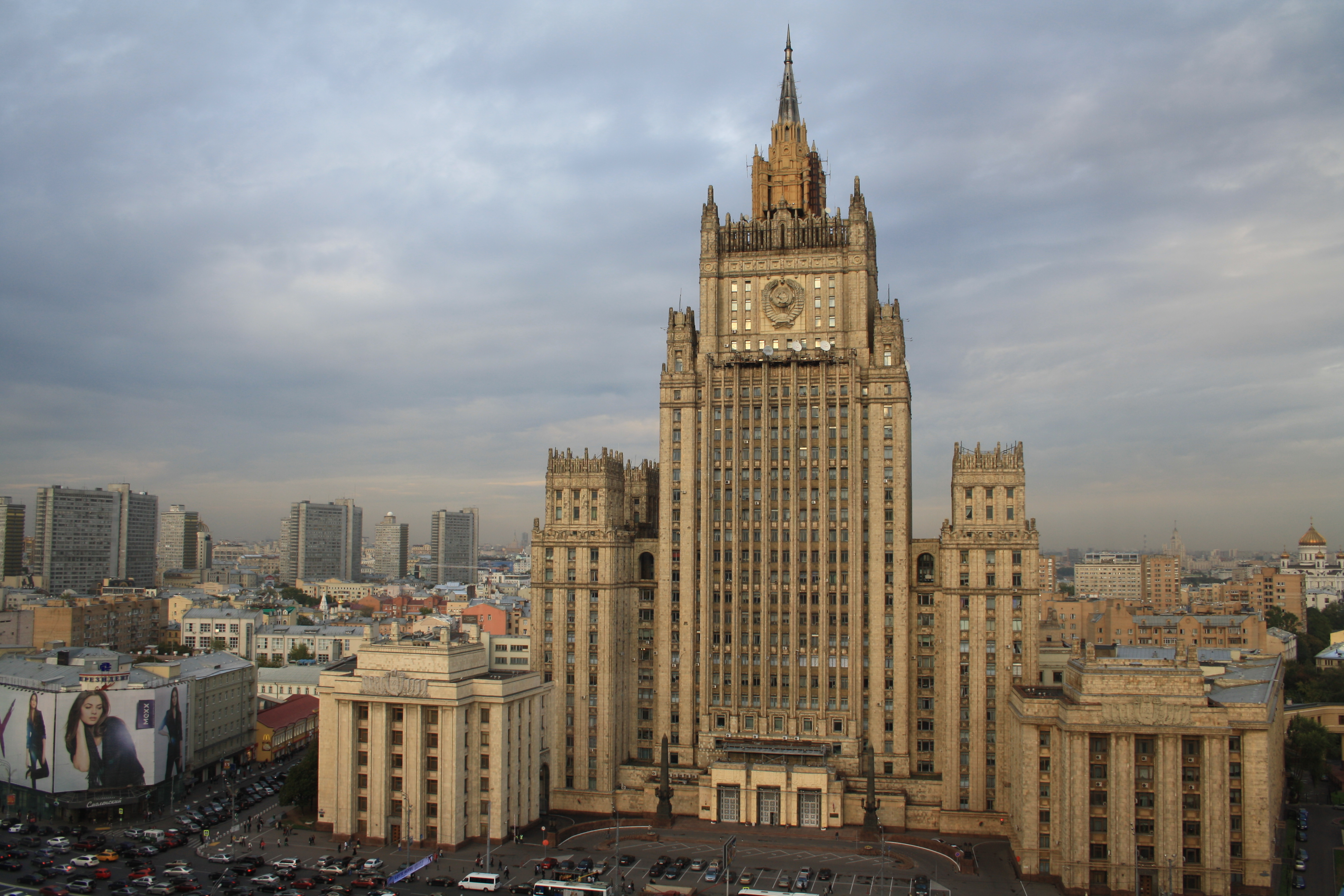
Ministry of Foreign Affairs, Moscow

Ambassadors of Russia are appointed by the President of Russia to serve as the head of Russian diplomatic mission to the respective countries, international organisations, or as ambassador-at-large. Ambassadors serve at the pleasure of the president. The modern position of ambassador was established during the Soviet era by the Supreme Soviet of the Soviet Union. This article lists currently serving Russian ambassadors and their assignments.

== Current Russian ambassadors ==
This list is arranged by continents.

=== Africa ===
Host country	List	Ambassador in office	Website	Appointment date	Special notes
Algeria	List	Aleksey Solomatin	Algiers	15 January 2025	
Angola	List	Vacant	Luanda		
Benin	List	Igor Yevdokimov	Porto-Novo	7 August 2017	
Botswana	List	Andrey Kemarsky	Gaborone	28 October 2020	
Burkina Faso	List	Igor Martynov	Ouagadougou	3 May 2024	
Burundi	List	Sergey Chernenko	Bujumbura	11 November 2025	
Cameroon	List	Georgy Todua	Yaounde	14 November 2023	
Cape Verde	List	Yuri Matery	Praia	8 September 2022	
Central African Republic	List	Aleksandr Bikantov	Bangui	10 January 2022	
Chad	List	Vladimir Sokolenko	N'Djamena	26 October 2022	
Comoros	List	Andrey Andreyev	Antananarivo	2 December 2020	Ambassador to Madagascar concurrently accredited in position
Congo	List	Ilyas Iskandarov	Brazzaville	16 January 2024	
Democratic Republic of Congo	List	Karl Tikhaze	Kinshasa	10 October 2024	
Djibouti	List	Mikhail Golovanov	Djibouti	24 April 2019	
Egypt	List	Georgy Borisenko	Cairo	27 April 2020	
Equatorial Guinea	List	Karen Chalyan	Malabo	14 June 2024	
Eritrea	List	Oleg Petrenko	Asmara	25 March 2025	
Eswatini	List	Vladimir Tararov	Maputo	18 August 2025	Ambassador to Mozambique concurrently accredited in position
Ethiopia	List	Yevgeny Terekhin	Addis Ababa	27 March 2019	
Gabon	List	Dmitry Korepanov	Libreville	16 January 2024	
Gambia	List	Dmitry Kurakov	Dakar	17 August 2020	Ambassador to Senegal concurrently accredited in position
Ghana	List	Sergey Berdinkov	Accra	17 May 2021	
Guinea	List	Aleksey Popov	Conakry	23 June 2023	
Guinea-Bissau	List	Aleksandr Yegorov	Bissau	9 March 2016	
Ivory Coast	List	Aleksey Saltykov	Abidjan	14 July 2022	
Kenya	List	Vsevolod Tkachenko	Nairobi	20 August 2024	
Lesotho	List	Roman Ambarov	Pretoria	6 September 2024	Ambassador to South Africa concurrently accredited in position
Liberia	List	Sergey Berdinkov	Accra	17 May 2021	Ambassador to Ghana concurrently accredited in position
Libya	List	Aydar Aganin	Tripoli	29 December 2022	
Madagascar	List	Andrey Andreyev	Antananarivo	2 December 2020	
Malawi	List	Nikolai Krasilnikov	Harare	26 June 2019	Ambassador to Zimbabwe concurrently accredited in position
Mali	List	Igor Gromyko	Bomako	17 June 2019	
Mauritania	List	Boris Zhilko	Nouakchott	4 February 2021	
Mauritius	List	Irada Zeynalova	Port Louis	13 September 2024	
Morocco	List	Vladimir Baybakov	Rabat	27 May 2022	
Mozambique	List	Vladimir Tararov	Maputo	18 August 2025	
Namibia	List	Dmitry Lobach	Windhoek	19 August 2022	
Niger	List	Viktor Voropayev	Niamey	20 August 2025	
Nigeria	List	Andrey Podyolyshev	Abuja	27 December 2024	
Rwanda	List	Alexander Polyakov	Kigali	14 June 2024	
Sao Tome and Principe	List	Vacant	Luanda		Ambassador to Angola concurrently accredited in position
Senegal	List	Dmitry Kurakov	Dakar	17 August 2020	
Seychelles	List	Artyom Kozhin	Victoria	15 January 2020	
Sierra Leone	List	Andrey Stolyarov	Freetown	21 October 2025	
Somalia	List	Mikhail Golovanov	Djibouti	24 April 2019	Ambassador to Djibouti concurrently accredited in position
South Africa	List	Roman Ambarov	Pretoria	6 September 2024	
South Sudan	List	Aleksandr Kosmodemyansky	Juba	11 September 2025	
Sudan	List	Andrey Chernoval	Khartoum	10 March 2023	
Tanzania	List	Andrey Avetisyan	Dar es Salam	5 April 2022	
Togo	List	Igor Yevdokimov	Porto-Novo	7 August 2017	Ambassador to Benin concurrently accredited in position
Tunisia	List	Aleksandr Zolotov	Tunis	11 January 2022	
Uganda	List	Vladlen Semivolos	Kampala	1 September 2021	
Zambia	List	Azim Yarkhmedov	Lusaka	7 December 2021	
Zimbabwe	List	Nikolai Krasilnikov	Harare	26 June 2019	

=== Americas ===
Host country	List	Ambassador in office	Website	Appointment date	Special notes
Antigua and Barbuda	List	Sergey Petrovich	Kingston	24 May 2021	Ambassadors to Jamaica concurrently accredited in the position
Argentina	List	Dmitry Feoktistov	Buenos Aires	20 June 2018	
Bahamas	List	Vacant			
Barbados	List	Vacant	Georgetown		Ambassadors to Guyana concurrently accredited in the position
Belize	List	Nikolai Sofinsky	Mexico City	10 February 2023	Ambassadors to Mexico concurrently accredited in the position
Bolivia	List	Dmitry Verchenko	La Paz	15 August 2024	
Brazil	List	Aleksey Labetsky	Brasília	21 January 2021	
Canada	List	Oleg Stepanov	Ottawa	9 March 2021	
Chile	List	Vladimir Belinsky	Santiago	28 June 2024	
Colombia	List	Nikolai Tavdumadze	Bogota	5 October 2020	
Costa Rica	List	Yury Bedzhanyan	San José	18 March 2019	
Cuba	List	Viktor Koronelli	Havana	10 February 2023	
Dominica	List	Sergey Petrovich	Kingston	24 May 2021	Ambassadors to Jamaica concurrently accredited in the position
Dominican Republic	List	Aleksey Seredin	Santo Domingo	11 March 2025	
Ecuador	List	Vladimir Sprinchan	Quito	10 February 2021	
El Salvador	List	Mikhail Ledenyov	Managua	15 August 2024	Ambassadors to Nicaragua concurrently accredited in the position
Grenada	List	Vacant			
Guatemala	List	Sergey Reshchikov	Guatemala City	1 April 2025	
Guyana	List	Andrey Printsepov	Georgetown	17 June 2025	
Haiti	List	Sergey Melik-Bagdasarov	Caracas	17 February 2020	Ambassadors to Venezuela concurrently accredited in the position
Honduras	List	Mikhail Ledenyov	Managua	15 August 2024	Ambassadors to Nicaragua concurrently accredited in the position
Jamaica	List	Sergey Petrovich	Kingston	24 May 2021	
Mexico	List	Nikolai Sofinsky	Mexico City	10 February 2023	
Nicaragua	List	Mikhail Ledenyov	Managua	15 August 2024	
Panama	List	Konstantin Gavrilov	Panama City	8 October 2024	
Paraguay	List	Aleksandr Pisarev	Asunción	5 October 2020	
Peru	List	Igor Romanchenko	Lima	18 June 2018	
Saint Kitts and Nevis	List	Sergey Petrovich	Kingston	24 May 2021	Ambassadors to Jamaica concurrently accredited in the position
Saint Lucia	List	Sergey Petrovich	Kingston	24 May 2021	Ambassadors to Jamaica concurrently accredited in the position
Saint Vincent and the Grenadines	List	Andrey Printsepov	Georgetown	3 July 2025	Ambassadors to Guyana concurrently accredited in the position
Suriname	List	Aleksey Labetsky	Brasília	21 January 2021	Ambassadors to Brazil concurrently accredited in the position
Trinidad and Tobago	List	Andrey Printsepov	Georgetown	8 August 2025	Ambassadors to Guyana concurrently accredited in the position
United States of America	List	Alexander Darchiev	Washington	6 March 2025	
Uruguay	List	Aleksey Isakov	Montevideo	22 April 2025	
Venezuela	List	Sergey Melik-Bagdasarov	Caracas	17 February 2020	

=== Asia ===
Host country	List	Ambassador in office	Website	Appointment date	Special notes
Afghanistan	List	Dmitry Zhirnov	Kabul	29 April 2020	
Armenia	List	Sergey Koprykin	Yerevan	6 April 2018	
Azerbaijan	List	Mikhail Yevdokimov	Baku	14 June 2023	
Bangladesh	List	Aleksandr Khozin	Dhaka	30 October 2024	
Bahrain	List	Aleksey Skosyrev	Manama	9 August 2022	
Brunei	List	Mikhail Baranov	Bandar Seri Begawan	17 January 2023	
Cambodia	List	Anatoly Borovik	Phnom Penh	4 May 2020	
China	List	Igor Morgulov	Beijing	13 September 2022	
Cyprus	List	Murat Zyazikov	Nicosia	12 September 2022	
East Timor	List	Sergey Tolchyonov	Jakarta	14 May 2024	Ambassador to Indonesia concurrently accredited in position
Georgia	List	Vacant	NA	since 2008	Diplomatic relations were interrupted on 30 September 2008
India	List	Denis Alipov	New Delhi	12 January 2022	
Indonesia	List	Sergey Tolchyonov	Jakarta	14 May 2024	
Israel	List	Anatoly Viktorov	Tel Aviv	5 April 2018	
Iran	List	Alexey Dedov	Tehran	8 September 2022	
Iraq	List	Elbrus Kutrashev	Baghdad	8 April 2021	
Japan	List	Nikolai Nozdrev	Tokyo	19 January 2024	
Jordan	List	Gleb Desyatnikov	Amman	28 December 2018	
Kazakhstan	List	Aleksey Borodavkin	Nur-Sultan	7 February 2018	
Kuwait	List	Vladimir Zheltov	Kuwait City	10 March 2023	
Kyrgyzstan	List	Sergey Vakunov	Bishkek	18 June 2024	
Laos	List	Sergey Zhyostky	Vientiane	22 October 2025	
Lebanon	List	Aleksandr Rudakov	Beirut	14 August 2020	
Malaysia	List	Nail Latypov	Kuala Lumpur	25 October 2019	
Maldives	List	Levan Dzhagaryan	Colombo	8 September 2022	Ambassador to Sri Lanka concurrently accredited in the position
Mongolia	List	Aleksey Yevsikov	Ulaanbaatar	18 January 2023	
Myanmar	List	Iskander Azizov	Yangon	23 June 2023	
Nepal	List	Vacant	Kathmandu		
North Korea	List	Vacant	Pyongyang		
Oman	List	Oleg Levin	Muscat	8 October 2024	
Pakistan	List	Albert Khorev	Islamabad	10 November 2023	
Philippines	List	Marat Pavlov	Manila	21 September 2020	
Qatar	List	Dmitry Dogadkin	Doha	9 November 2021	
Saudi Arabia	List	Sergey Kozlov	Riyadh	20 February 2017	
Singapore	List	Sergey Ganzha	Singapore	15 July 2025	
South Korea	List	Georgy Zinoviev	Seoul	7 December 2023	
Sri Lanka	List	Levan Dzhagaryan	Colombo	8 September 2022	
Syria	List	Aleksandr Yefimov	Damascus	29 October 2018	
Tajikistan	List	Semyon Grigoryev	Dushanbe	16 August 2022	
Thailand	List	Yevgeny Tomikhin	Bangkok	2 November 2018	
Turkey	List	vacant	Ankara		
Turkmenistan	List	Ivan Volynkin	Ashgabat	6 April 2023	
United Arab Emirates	List	Timur Zabirov	Abu Dhabi	30 August 2021	
Uzbekistan	List	Alexei Yerkhov	Tashkent	5 September 2025	
Vietnam	List	Gennady Bezdetko	Hanoi	25 March 2021	
Yemen	List	Yevgeny Kudrov	Sanaa	1 October 2025	

=== Oceania ===
Host country	List	Ambassador in office	Website	Appointment date	Special notes
Australia	List	Mikhail Petrakov	Canberra	21 August 2025	
Fiji	List	Mikhail Petrakov	Canberra	31 October 2025	Ambassador to Australia concurrently accredited in the position
Kiribati	List	Sergey Tolchyonov	Jakarta	14 May 2024	Ambassador to Indonesia concurrently accredited in the position
Marshall Islands	List	Marat Pavlov	Manila	21 September 2020	Ambassador to Philippines concurrently accredited in the position
Micronesia	List	Vacant			Diplomatic relations broken off in 2022
Nauru	List	Vacant	Canberra		Ambassador to Australia concurrently accredited in the position
New Zealand	List	Georgy Zuyev	Wellington	4 June 2018	
Palau	List	Marat Pavlov	Manila	21 September 2020	Ambassador to Philippines concurrently accredited in the position
Papua New Guinea	List	Sergey Tolchyonov	Jakarta	14 May 2024	Ambassador to Indonesia concurrently accredited in the position
Samoa	List	Georgy Zuyev	Wellington	4 June 2018	Ambassador to New Zealand concurrently accredited in the position
Tonga	List	Georgy Zuyev	Wellington	4 June 2018	Ambassador to New Zealand concurrently accredited in the position
Tuvalu	List	Vacant	Canberra		Ambassador to Australia concurrently accredited in the position
Vanuatu	List	Mikhail Petrakov	Canberra	18 November 2025	Ambassador to Australia concurrently accredited in the position

=== Europe ===
Host country	List	Ambassador in office	Website	Appointment date	Special notes
Abkhazia	List	Mikhail Shurgalin	Sukhumi	31 May 2022	
Albania	List	Aleksey Zaitsev	Tirana	14 June 2024	
Andorra	List	Yuri Klimenko	Madrid	18 November 2022	Ambassador to Spain concurrently accredited in the position
Austria	List	Andrey Grozov	Vienna	14 October 2025	
Belarus	List	Boris Gryzlov	Minsk	14 January 2022	
Belgium	List	Denis Gonchar	Brussels	29 July 2025	
Bosnia and Herzegovina	List	Igor Kalbukhov	Sarajevo	6 November 2020	
Bulgaria	List	Eleonora Mitrofanova	Sofia	15 January 2021	
Croatia	List	Aleksandr Nurizade	Zagreb	7 May 2024	
Czech Republic	List	Anna Ponomaryova	Prague	23 December 2025	
Denmark	List	Vladimir Barbin	Copenhagen	12 December 2018	
Estonia	List	Vacant	Tallinn		
Finland	List	Pavel Kuznetsov	Helsinki	14 August 2017	
France	List	Aleksey Meshkov	Paris	23 October 2017	
Germany	List	Sergey Nechayev	Berlin	10 January 2018	
Greece	List	Andrey Maslov	Athens	16 June 2014	
Holy See	List	Ivan Soltanovsky		16 May 2023	
Hungary	List	Yevgeny Stanislavov	Budapest	18 February 2021	
Iceland	List	Vacant	Reykjavík		
Ireland	List	Yury Filatov	Dublin	26 July 2017	
Italy	List	Aleksey Paramonov	Rome	4 April 2023	
Latvia	List	Vacant	Riga		
Liechtenstein	List	Sergey Garmonin	Bern	9 December 2016	Ambassadors to Switzerland concurrently accredited in the position
Lithuania	List	Vacant	Vilnius		
Luxembourg	List	Dmitry Lobanov	Luxembourg	17 September 2020	
Malta	List	Andrei Lopukhov	Valletta	29 October 2021	
Moldova	List	Oleg Ozerov	Chișinău	10 September 2024	
Monaco	List	Aleksey Meshkov	Paris	23 October 2017	Ambassadors to France concurrently accredited in the position
Montenegro	List	Aleksandr Lukashik	Podgorica	10 April 2025	
Netherlands	List	Vladimir Tarabrin	The Hague	5 December 2023	
North Macedonia	List	Dmitry Zykov	Skopje	25 December 2025	
Norway	List	Nikolai Korchunov	Oslo	1 October 2024	
Poland	List	Vacant	Warsaw		
Portugal	List	Mikhail Kamynin	Lisbon	18 June 2018	
Romania	List	Vladimir Lipayev	Bucharest	20 June 2024	
San Marino	List	Aleksey Paramonov	Rome	4 April 2023	Ambassadors to Italy concurrently accredited in the position
Serbia	List	Aleksandr Botsan-Kharchenko	Belgrade	10 June 2019	
Slovakia	List	Sergey Andreyev	Bratislava	2 December 2025	
Slovenia	List	Timur Eyvazov	Ljubljana	18 November 2019	
South Ossetia	List	Marat Kulakhmetov		23 May 2017	
Spain	List	Yuri Klimenko	Madrid	18 November 2022	
Sweden	List	Sergey Belyayev	Stockholm	25 October 2024	
Switzerland	List	Sergey Garmonin	Bern	9 December 2016	
Ukraine	List	Vacant			
United Kingdom	List	Andrey Kelin	London	5 November 2019	

=== International organisations ===
Organisation	List	Ambassador in office	Appointment date	Special notes
United Nations	List	Vasily Nebenzya	26 July 2017	
United Nations Office at Geneva	List	Gennady Gatilov	31 January 2018	
UNESCO	List	Rinat Alyautdinov	12 January 2023	
United Nations Office at Vienna	List	Mikhail Ulyanov	23 January 2018	
United Nations Office at Nairobi	List	Vsevolod Tkachenko	20 August 2024	
United Nations Economic and Social Commission for Asia and the Pacific	List	Yevgeny Tomikhin	2 November 2018	
European Union	List	Karen Malyan	November 2024	
Organization for Security and Co-operation in Europe	List	Aleksandr Lukashevich	5 August 2015	
Commonwealth of Independent States	List	Andrey Grozov	17 August 2018	
Organisation for the Prohibition of Chemical Weapons	List	Vladimir Tarabrin	5 December 2023	
Conference on Disarmament	List	Gennady Gatilov	31 January 2018	
Food and Agriculture Organization and the World Food Programme	List	Igor Golubovsky	3 October 2023	
Organisation of Islamic Cooperation	List	Turko Daudov	17 July 2023	
Collective Security Treaty Organization	List	Viktor Vasilyev	9 April 2024	
Arab League	List	Georgy Borisenko	27 April 2020	
African Union	List	Yevgeny Terekhin	27 March 2019	
Organization of American States	List	Alexander Darchiev	6 March 2025	
Latin American Integration Association	List	Aleksey Isakov	22 April 2025	
Association of Southeast Asian Nations	List	Yevgeny Zagaynov	28 March 2023	
World Trade Organization	List	Nikolai Platonov	1 March 2024	
International Seabed Authority	List	Sergey Petrovich	24 May 2021	

== See also ==
- Lists of ambassadors of Russia
- List of diplomatic missions of Russia
- Foreign relations of Russia
