= Stanisław Pestkowski =

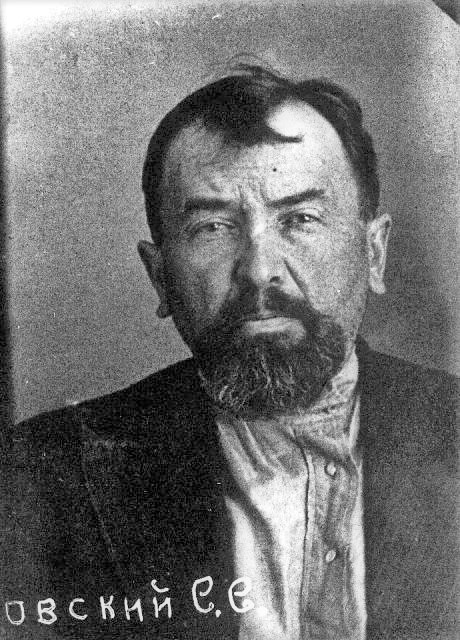
Mugshot of Pestkowski by the NKVD, c. 1937

Stanisław Pestkowski (Russian: Станислав Станиславович Пестковский, romanized: Stanislav Stanislavovich Pestkovsky; (Note: In this name that follows East Slavic naming customs, the patronymic is Stanislavovich and the family name is Pestkovsky.) 3 December 1882 – 15 November 1937) was a Polish Bolshevik active in the Russian Revolution of 1917.

Born in Kiełczygłów in a noble family, Poland, he joined the Social Democracy of the Kingdom of Poland and Lithuania and was strongly influenced by Rosa Luxemburg. In 1917, he went to Russia where he became Commissar for Telegraphs in the Bolshevik government.

From 1917 he worked in Narkomnats, the Soviet People's Commissariat of Nationalities. While Joseph Stalin was the titular Commissar, in practice much of the work was delegated to Pestkovsky. Originally the Petrograd Milrevkom, or Military Revolutionary Committee, blocked the formation of Pol'kom, a Polish Commissariat which Julian Leschinsky wished to set up. Following the intervention of Stalin and Felix Dzerzhinsky, Milrevkom's obstruction was overcome and Pol'kom was established on 23 November 1917. Pol'kom then set about sovietising all Polish organisations in Russia.

He was a delegate to the Second Congress of the Communist International held in August 1920.

From 30 April 1919 to August 1920 Pestkowski was Secretary of the Kirghiz Regional Committee of the Communist Party of the Soviet Union. From 1924 to 1926 he was Soviet ambassador to Mexico.

He disappeared in Stalin's Great Purge of 1937, was executed on 15 November 1937, and exonerated posthumously in 1955.
