= Konstantin Umansky =

Soviet diplomat, editor and journalist

- Константин Уманский
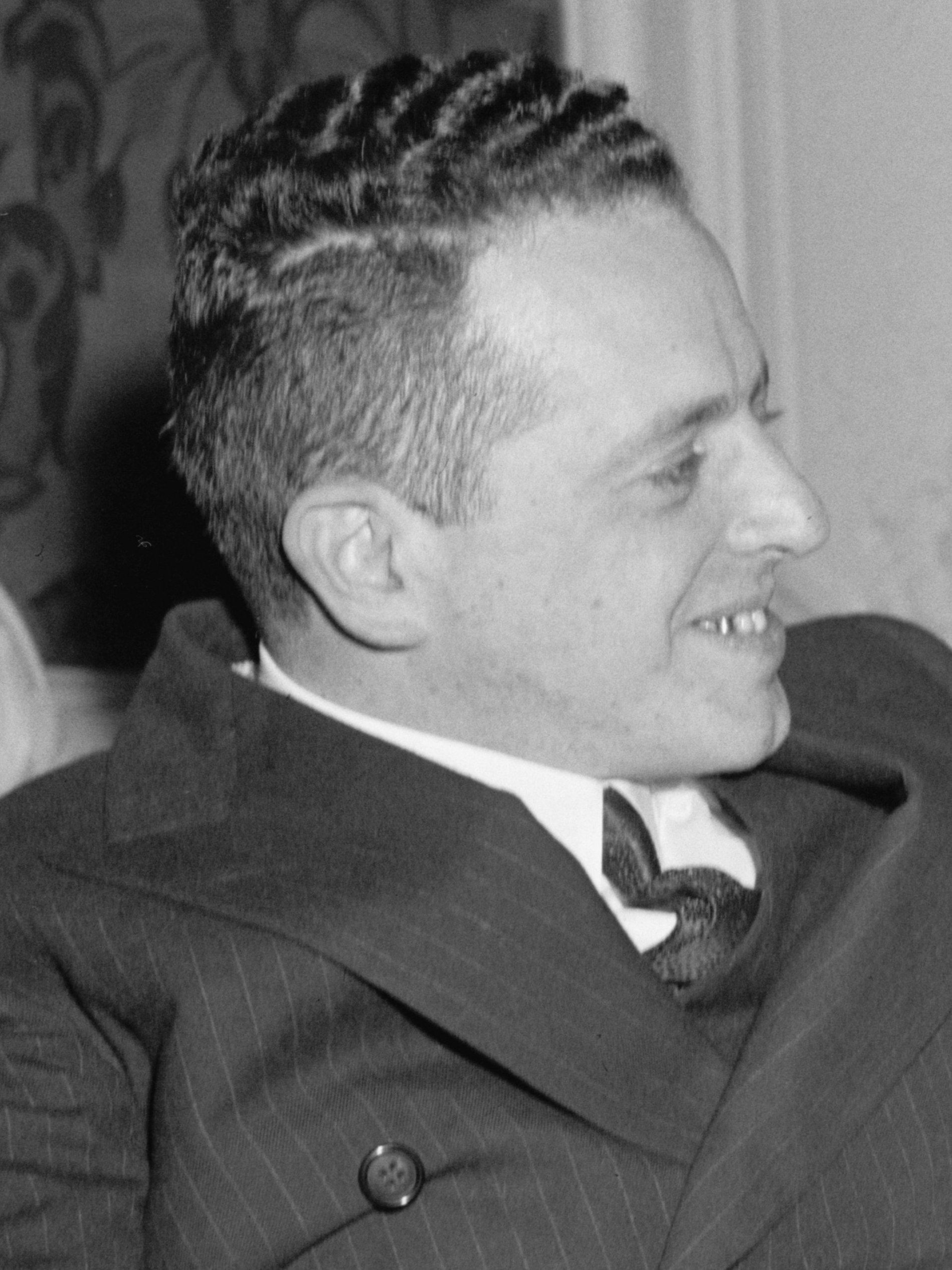
- Umansky in 1939

Soviet Ambassador to the United States
- In office 6 June 1939 – 5 November 1941
- Premier: Vyacheslav Molotov; Joseph Stalin
- Preceded by: Alexander Troyanovsky
- Succeeded by: Nikolai Vasilevich Novikov

Personal details
- Born: 14 May 1902 Mykolaiv, Russian Empire
- Died: 25 January 1945 (aged 42) Mexico City, Mexico
- Resting place: Novodevichy Cemetery, Moscow
- Party: Russian Communist Party (1919–1945)
- Education: Moscow University
- Profession: Diplomat, journalist

Konstantin Aleksandrovich Umansky (Russian: Kонстантин Aлександрович Уманский; 14 May 1902 – 25 January 1945) was a Soviet diplomat, editor, journalist and artist.

== Biography and career ==
Umansky, whose family were of Jewish origin, was born in Mykolaiv; he began studies at Moscow University in 1918, and joined the Russian Communist Party (Bolsheviks) in 1919. Later that year he moved to Germany where he soon started writing material informing the avant-garde art scene in Berlin of the artistic developments in Russia. Late in 1920 he moved to Vienna, where he worked for ROSTA. In November 1920 he contributed a slide-illustrated lecture to a "Russian Evening" sponsored by the art magazine MA, produced by revolutionary exiles from Hungary who had fled there following the crushing of the Hungarian Soviet Republic.

From August to October 1922, Umansky worked in the People's Commissariat of Foreign Affairs. His ability to learn new languages (he was said to be able to learn a new language in a month) and proficiency in Russian, French, Italian, German and English gained him a position with the Telegraph Agency of the Soviet Union (TASS) as a correspondent, which took him abroad to places including Rome, Paris and Geneva. Working for TASS from 1922–1931, there were rumours that his career in journalism was mixed with secret police activities, but Umansky refused to answer questions on this subject, stating only, "It is beneath my dignity to answer such a question." The Historical Dictionary of Signals Intelligence lists him as a REDAKTOR (NKVD Mexico).

From 1931 to 1936, Umansky worked in the Press and Information Department of the Soviet People's Commissariat of Foreign Affairs, first as its Deputy Head, and then as its Head. In this capacity, he was the principal censor of dispatches sent abroad by foreign journalists based in Moscow. Eugene Lyons, the correspondent of United Press recalled:

Our conversation was on a high level of international affairs, but under it I read in his gold smile, "You dislike me because I'm an egocentric Soviet go-getter, but watch me rise to commissar..." In this suavely scheming Comrade Umansky, clever with the devious shrewdness of a clothing salesman, ironical to underlings and toadying to higher-ups, discreetly indulging a sybaritic streak, I was coming to see (Perhaps unfairly, but despite myself) the quintessence of revolutionary technique.

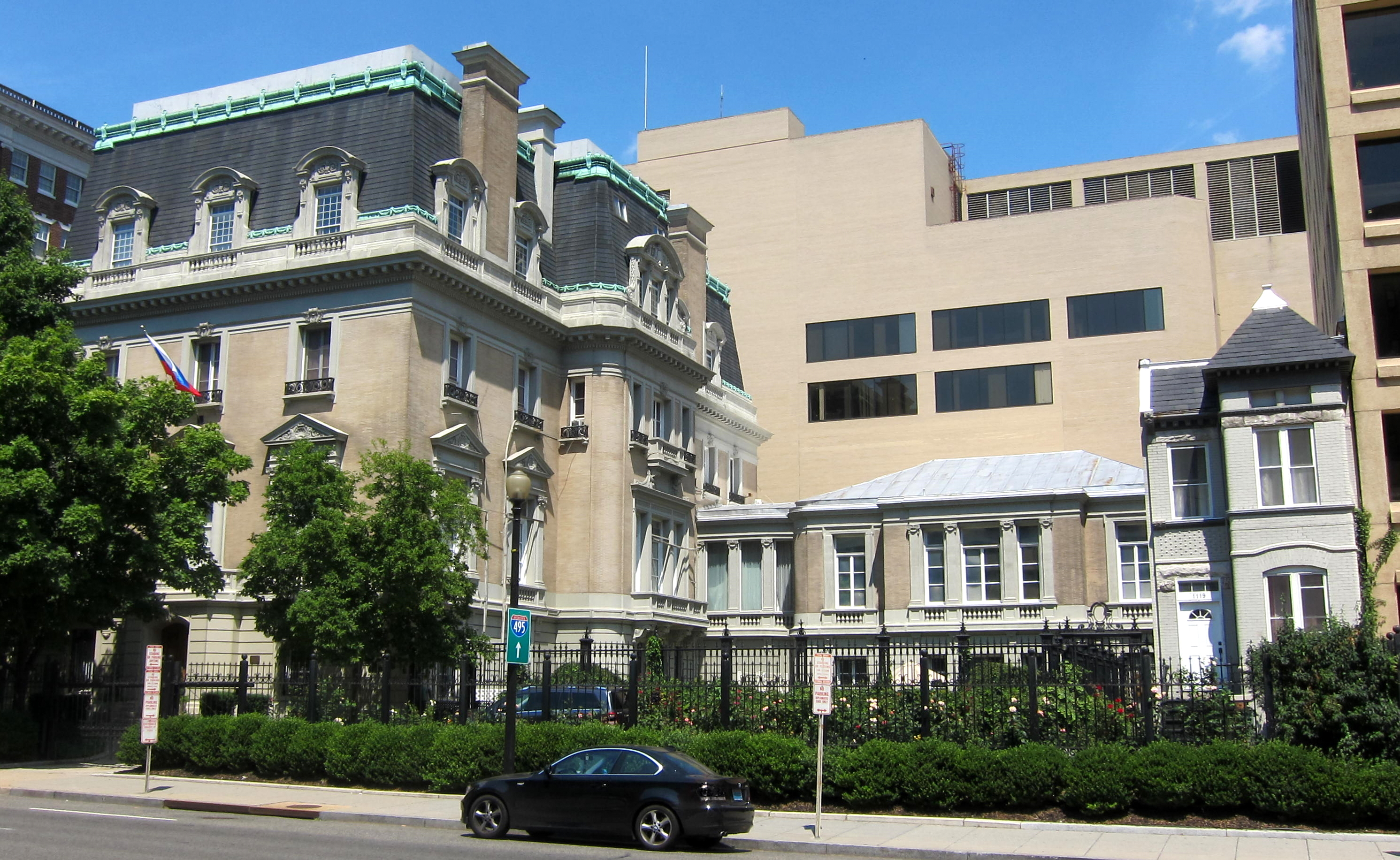
Umansky's former residence in Washington, D.C.

In 1936, Umansky was posted to Washington, D.C. where he was an Adviser at the Soviet Embassy. When the diplomatic mission of Alexander Troyanovsky was completed, Umansky acted as chargé d'affaires of the embassy. On 11 May 1939, Umansky was appointed by Joseph Stalin as Ambassador of the Soviet Union to the United States and he presented his Letters of Credence to U.S. President Franklin D. Roosevelt on 6 June 1939, becoming, at the time, the youngest Ambassador in Washington, D.C.

In April 1941, Hans Thomsen, a diplomat at the German embassy in Washington, D.C., sent a message to Joachim von Ribbentrop, the German foreign minister, informing him that "an absolutely reliable source" had told Thomsen that the Americans had broken the Japanese diplomatic code (code-named "Purple" by the Americans). At least one historian identified this source as Umansky (in an indirect manner) based upon communications from U.S. Undersecretary of State Sumner Welles. These warnings were duly forwarded on to the Japanese government, but in the end they were not acted upon, and American cryptographers continued to read Japanese messages through the war.

Umansky clashed with Franklin D Roosevelt when the Soviet Union sought to buy US war materiel in September 1941. The historian Ian Kershaw wrote "When the unpalatable Soviet ambassador, Konstantin Oumansky, proved stubborn, unaccommodating and unwilling to acknowledge that gold reserves could be used to cover payments, an angry and frustrated Roosevelt described him in a Cabinet meeting as ‘a dirty little liar’ ".

Upon his return to Moscow, he worked at the People's Commissariat of Foreign Affairs. Promoted to the diplomatic rank of Ambassador Extraordinary and Plenipotentiary on 14 June 1943, Umansky was appointed by Stalin on 17 June 1943 as Ambassador of the Soviet Union to Mexico. Umansky presented his credentials to President of Mexico, Manuel Ávila Camacho on 22 June 1943. At the ceremony of the presentation of credentials, Umansky presented his speech in English, for which he apologised to Ávila Camacho, promising that he would learn Spanish; he became fluent in just three months. The reasons for the posting of a diplomat the calibre of Umansky to Mexico was unclear, and it had been suggested on numerous occasions that Umansky was posted to Mexico as part of undercover activities, though the U.S. news-magazine Time said in 1945 that Umansky's behaviour as a diplomat was always above reproach. However, according to U.S. Secretary of State (1933–1944) Cordell Hull:

[He was] insulting in his manner and speech, and had an infallible faculty for antagonizing those of us with whom he came in contact. Overbearing, he made demands for concessions as if they were his natural right....In my opinion, he did much to harm Russian-American relations.

It has also been suggested that Umansky was posted to Mexico as part of a campaign to improve perceptions of the Soviet Union, which had taken a battering following the Stalin-orchestrated assassination of Leon Trotsky in Mexico in 1940. According to Germán List Arzubide, Umansky was the most popular diplomat in Mexico. Due to the efforts of Umansky, by the end of 1944 Soviet–Mexico relations had regained a friendly character, and both countries intended to expand their relations in the post-war period.

On 8 July 1944 Umansky was appointed Ambassador of the Soviet Union to Costa Rica, in concurrence with his posting in Mexico. On 25 January 1945 Umansky was to travel to San José in Costa Rica to present his Letters of Credence to Costa Rican President Teodoro Picado Michalski, but the Mexican Air Force plane which he was aboard crashed on take-off in Mexico City, killing the Ambassador, his wife (Raisa Umanskaya) and three embassy officials. The cause of the crash is unknown. After the crash tens of thousands of Mexicans paid their respects to Umansky at the Soviet Embassy, led by President Ávila Camacho. In an obituary, Mexican newspaper Excélsior wrote "With Umansky, a new era in local diplomatic activity has begun. Many foreign diplomats have passed through Mexico, but those who were here at that time, should recognise that they lived in the diplomatic world of the Umansky era".

Umansky's body was cremated and his ashes were buried at Novodevichy Cemetery.

== Works ==
- Neue Kunst in Russland 1914-1919 (New Art in Russia 1914-1919), Potsdam: Gustav Kiepenheuer, München:Hans Goltz
