= Aleksandr Avdeyev (politician, born 1946) =

Russian diplomat

- Александр Авдеев
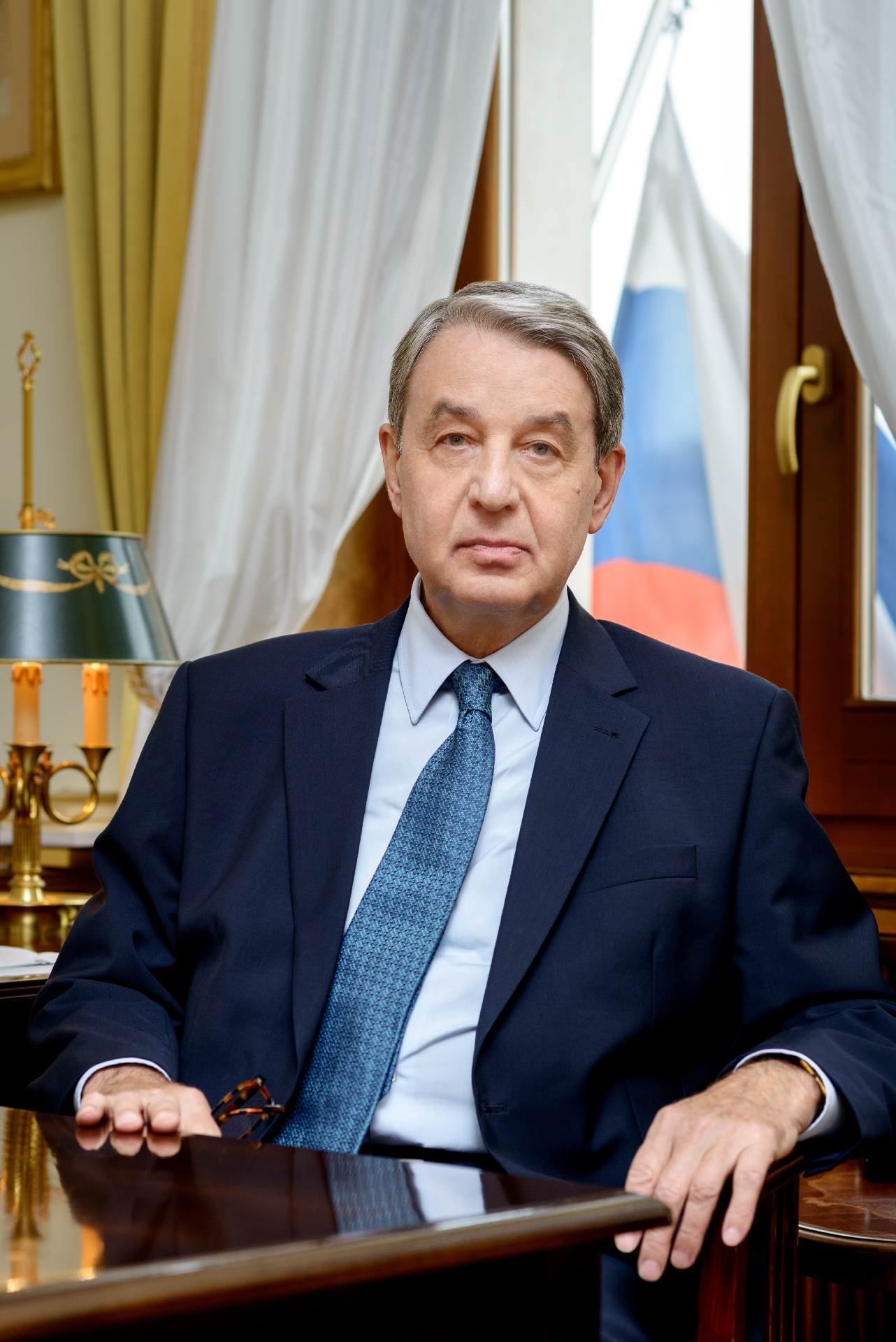
- Avdeyev in 2016

Minister of Culture
- In office 12 May 2008 – 7 May 2012
- President: Vladimir Putin
- Prime Minister: Dmitry Medvedev
- Preceded by: Aleksandr Sokolov
- Succeeded by: Vladimir Medinsky

Personal details
- Born: September 8, 1946 (age 80) Kremenchuk, Ukrainian SSR, Soviet Union
- Education: MGIMO
- Profession: Diplomat
- Awards: Order "For Merit to the Fatherland", Order of Honour, Order of Friendship, Legion of Honour, Order of Merit of the Italian Republic, Order of Stara Planina,

Aleksandr Alekseyevich Avdeyev (Russian: Александр Алексеевич Авдеев; born 8 September 1946) is a Russian and Soviet politician and diplomat. He was the Ambassador of the Soviet Union to Luxembourg from 1987 to 1990, the Russian Ambassador to Bulgaria from 1992 to 1996 and the Ambassador of Russia to France from 2002 to 2008. He later served as the Minister of Culture from 2008 to 2012.

Avdeyev served as the Ambassador of Russia to the Holy See and to the Sovereign Order of Malta from January 2013 until May 2023.

== Career ==
=== Minister of Culture ===
On 26 January 2010 he met with Vladimir Putin (then the Prime Minister of Russia) to discuss reconstruction of various Russian theatres, especially Bolshoi Theatre so that it will be ready for the 150th anniversary of notable Russian writer Anton Chekhov. During the meeting with he also discussed circus system and various ways on how to acquire Russian cultural pieces from abroad.

On 19 November 2010 he met with French Minister of Culture Frederic Mitterrand with whom he discussed the foundation of joint Russian and French Film Academy of Motion Picture Arts. On 6 July 2011 he spoke at State Duma during the question time where he suggested to expand state law regarding Russian monuments.

On 11 March 2012 he assured Vladimir Putin that he almost completed remodeling of Pushkin Museum and the same day issued a concern that Literary Fund did not have enough financing to remodel all Peredelkino museums. During the same meeting he mentioned that he and Olga Okudzhava agreed on building a museum for her deceased husband and bard Bulat Okudzhava. He also mentioned that as of now the ministry is rebuilding museums in Tsarskoye Selo, Saransk as well as Vladikavkaz and is nearly completed reconstruction of Tovstonogov Bolshoi Drama Theater and the second complex of the Mariinsky Theatre.

== Controversies ==
On 13 January 2013 he proclaimed the Schneersohn Library to be "the unalienable property of Russia" urging to ignore the decisions of American courts of returning the collection to Library of Agudas Chassidei Chabad as "provocative".
