= List of ambassadors of Russia to Papua New Guinea =

Ambassador of the Russian Federation to the Independent State of Papua New Guinea
- Emblem of the Ministry of Foreign Affairs

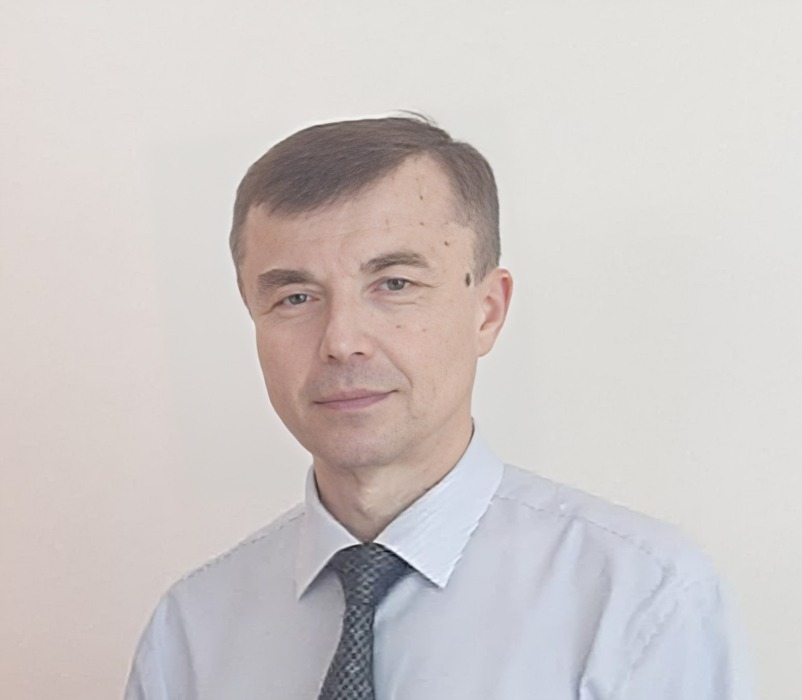
- Incumbent; Sergey Tolchenov since 2 December 2024
- Ministry of Foreign Affairs
- Style: His Excellency
- Reports to: Minister of Foreign Affairs
- Residence: Embassy of Russia in Jakarta
- Seat: Jakarta
- Appointer: The president
- Term length: At the pleasure of the president
- Website: Embassy of Russia in Jakarta

The ambassador extraordinary and plenipotentiary of the Russian Federation to Papua New Guinea is the official representative of the president and the government of Russia to the king and the government of Papua New Guinea.

The ambassador and his staff work at large in the Embassy of Russia in Jakarta in Indonesia. The current Russian ambassador to Papua New Guinea is Sergey Tolchenov, incumbent since 2 December 2024. The ambassador to Papua New Guinea is a non-resident ambassador who has dual accreditation as ambassador to Indonesia since 1995.

== History of diplomatic relations ==
Diplomatic relations between the Soviet Union and Papua New Guinea were established on 19 May 1976. Relations were initially handled through the Soviet embassy in Australia, with the Soviet ambassador to Australia dually accredited to Papua New Guinea. The first ambassador, Yevgeny Samoteykin, was appointed on 13 May 1986. The first ambassador accredited solely to Papua New Guinea was Yevgeny Rogov, appointed on 17 January 1990. With the dissolution of the Soviet Union in 1991, Papua New Guinea recognised the Russian Federation as its successor state. The incumbent Soviet ambassador, Rogov, continued as the Russian ambassador until July 1993, when the embassy in Port Moresby was closed as a cost-saving measure. He was succeeded in 1995 by Nikolai Solovyov, the ambassador to Indonesia, who was given concurrent accreditation as the ambassador to Papua New Guinea.

== List of representatives of Russia to Papua New Guinea (1986–present) ==
=== Ambassadors of the Soviet Union to Papua New Guinea (1986–1991) ===
Name	Title	Appointment	Termination	Notes
Yevgeny Samoteykin	Ambassador	13 May 1986	17 January 1990	Concurrently ambassador to Australia
Yevgeny Rogov	Ambassador	17 January 1990	25 December 1991	

=== Ambassadors of the Russian Federation to Papua New Guinea (1991–present) ===
Name	Title	Appointment	Termination	Notes
Yevgeny Rogov	Ambassador	25 December 1991	13 July 1993	
Nikolai Solovyov	Ambassador	13 September 1995	29 September 1998	Concurrently ambassador to Indonesia
Vladimir Plotnikov	Ambassador	3 February 2000	6 October 2004	Concurrently ambassador to Indonesia
Mikhail Bely	Ambassador	6 October 2004	19 January 2007	Concurrently ambassador to Indonesia
Aleksandr Ivanov	Ambassador	6 March 2007	11 October 2012	Concurrently ambassador to Indonesia
Mikhail Galuzin	Ambassador	15 March 2013	29 January 2018	Concurrently ambassador to Indonesia; Credentials presented on 24 November 2014
Lyudmila Vorobyova	Ambassador	20 April 2018	1 March 2024	Concurrently ambassador to Indonesia
Sergey Tolchenov	Ambassador	2 December 2024		Concurrently ambassador to Indonesia
