= Vladimir Titorenko =

Russian diplomat

Vladimir Efimovich Titorenko (Russian: Владимир Ефимович Титоренко, born 1958) is a Russian diplomat and was a former Ambassador Extraordinary and Plenipotentiary of the Russian Federation to the People's Democratic Republic of Algeria. He was also the Russian ambassador to Qatar and Iraq.

On July 6, 2003, a convoy of Russian diplomats and journalists were attacked outside Baghdad after it entered an area where U.S. forces were engaged with Iraqi resistance. The convoy was reportedly fleeing from a Syrian embassy in Baghdad, five Russians were wounded in the confusion. Vladimir Titorenko later accused American troops of firing on his convoy, claiming that there were no Iraqi units present in the area during the firefight. U.S. ambassador to Russia denied Titorenko's accusations.

From January 15, 2019, to January 10, 2022, he served as the Ambassador of the Russian Federation to the Central African Republic.

== See also ==
- Embassy of Russia in Algiers
- Iraqi Insurgency
