= List of ambassadors of Russia to Guatemala =

Ambassador of the Russian Federation to the Republic of Guatemala
- Emblem of the Russian Foreign Ministry
- Incumbent; Sergey Reshchikov since 1 April 2025
- Ministry of Foreign Affairs; Embassy of Russia in Guatemala City
- Style: His Excellency
- Reports to: Minister of Foreign Affairs
- Seat: Guatemala City
- Appointer: President of Russia
- Term length: At the pleasure of the president
- Website: Embassy of Russia in Guatemala

The ambassador extraordinary and plenipotentiary of Russia to Guatemala is the official representative of the president and the government of the Russian Federation to the president and the government of Guatemala.

The ambassador and his staff work at large in the Embassy of Russia in Guatemala City. The post of Russian ambassador to Guatemala is currently held by Sergey Reshchikov, incumbent since 1 April 2025.

== History of diplomatic relations ==
Relations between the forerunners of Russia and Guatemala date back to the late nineteenth century, with diplomatic contacts from 1880 between Tsar Alexander II and President of Guatemala Justo Rufino Barrios. Relations between the Soviet Union and Guatemala were first established on 19 April 1945. Though relations were maintained throughout the existence of the Soviet Union, it was not until after the dissolution of the Soviet Union that the two countries agreed to exchange ambassadors, with the incumbent ambassador to Costa Rica given dual accreditation to Guatemala. The first ambassador, Vladimir Kazimirov, was appointed on 24 July 1996. The practice of the ambassador to Costa Rica having dual accreditation to Guatemala came to an end with the appointment of Nikolai Vladimir on 14 November 2007, as the first ambassador solely accredited to Guatemala.

== List of representatives of Russia to Guatemala (1996–present) ==
Name	Title	Appointment	Termination	Notes
Vladimir Kazimirov	Ambassador	24 July 1996	14 October 1999	Concurrently ambassador to Costa Rica
Nikolai Yelizarov	Ambassador	14 October 1999	25 March 2004	Concurrently ambassador to Costa Rica
Valery Nikolayenko	Ambassador	2 April 2004	14 November 2007	Concurrently ambassador to Costa Rica
Nikolai Vladimir	Ambassador	14 November 2007	4 October 2011	
Nikolai Babich	Ambassador	4 October 2011	3 October 2017	
Aleksandr Khokholikov	Ambassador	3 October 2017	21 November 2020	Credentials presented on 12 December 2017
Vladimir Vinokurov	Ambassador	24 May 2021	10 October 2024	Credentials presented on 3 August 2021
Maksim Raku	Chargé d'affaires	June 2024	April 2025	
Sergey Reshchikov	Ambassador	1 April 2025		Credentials presented on 14 May 2025
