= List of ambassadors of Russia to Burundi =

Ambassador of the Russian Federation to the Republic of Burundi
- Emblem of the Russian Foreign Ministry
- Incumbent; Sergey Chernenko since 11 November 2025
- Ministry of Foreign Affairs; Embassy of Russia in Bujumbura
- Style: His Excellency; The Honourable
- Reports to: Minister of Foreign Affairs
- Seat: Bujumbura
- Appointer: President of Russia
- Term length: At the pleasure of the president
- Website: Embassy of Russia in Burundi

The ambassador extraordinary and plenipotentiary of the Russian Federation to the Republic of Burundi is the official representative of the president and the government of the Russian Federation to the president and the government of Burundi.

The Russian ambassador to Burundi and his staff work at large in the Embassy of Russia in Bujumbura. The post of Russian ambassador to Burundi is currently held by Sergey Chernenko, incumbent since 11 November 2025.

== History of diplomatic relations ==
Diplomatic relations between the Soviet Union and Burundi were established on 1 October 1962. The Soviet Union was initially represented through its embassy in Léopoldville, in the Democratic Republic of the Congo, with the ambassador to the Democratic Republic of the Congo holding dual accreditation to Burundi. The embassy in Bujumbura opened in 1964 with Ivan Marchuk appointed ambassador later that year. With the dissolution of the Soviet Union in 1991 the incumbent Soviet ambassador continued as representative of the Russian Federation until 1995.

== List of representatives (1963–present) ==
=== Soviet Union to Burundi (1963–1991) ===
Name	Title	Appointment	Termination	Notes
Sergey Nemchina	Ambassador	8 March 1963	19 June 1964	Concurrently ambassador to the Democratic Republic of the Congo
Ivan Marchuk	Ambassador	10 July 1964	1 July 1967	
Mikhail Kryukov	Ambassador	1 July 1967	25 December 1970	
Aleksei Naumov	Ambassador	25 December 1970	10 July 1974	
Dmitri Pozhidaev	Ambassador	10 July 1974	28 January 1980	
Valeriy Levikov	Ambassador	29 January 1980	28 April 1986	
Valery Tsybukov	Ambassador	28 April 1986	19 May 1988	
Vsevolod Sofinsky	Ambassador	19 May 1988	15 February 1991	
Artur Vesyolov	Ambassador	15 February 1991	25 December 1991	

=== Russian Federation to Burundi (1991–present) ===
Name	Title	Appointment	Termination	Notes
Artur Vesyolov	Ambassador	25 December 1991	22 May 1995	
Igor Lyakin-Frolov	Ambassador	22 May 1995	24 August 1999	
Gennady Gumenyuk	Ambassador	24 August 1999	4 March 2005	
Vladimir Timofeyev	Ambassador	4 March 2005	15 February 2011	
Vladimir Malyshev	Ambassador	15 February 2011	1 December 2014	
Georgy Todua	Ambassador	1 December 2014	17 July 2019	
Valery Mikhailov	Ambassador	17 July 2019	11 November 2025	
Sergey Chernenko	Ambassador	11 November 2025		
