= Vagif Garaev =

Soviet diplomat (born 1955)

- Vaqif Məmmədvəli oğlu Qarayev

Ambassador of Russia to Bahrain
- Incumbent
- Assumed office 29 December 2014
- Preceded by: Viktor Simirnov

Vagif Mammadvali oghlu Garaev (Russian: Вагиф Мамедвели оглы Гараев; 24 January 1955, Mingachevir, Azerbaijan SSR) is a Russian diplomat who served as the Ambassador Extraordinary and Plenipotentiary of the Russian Federation to Bahrain. He was appointed to the position by decree of Russian President Vladimir Putin on 29 December 2014.

== Early life and education ==
Vagif Garaev was born on 24 January 1955 in Mingachevir, Azerbaijan SSR, Soviet Union. He graduated from the Moscow State Institute of International Relations.

In 1997, he graduated from the Higher Courses of the Diplomatic Academy of the Ministry of Foreign Affairs of the Russian Federation. He has worked in the diplomatic service since 1978.

== Diplomatic career ==
From 1994 to 1999, Garaev served as head of the Consular Department of the Ministry of Foreign Affairs of Russia.

From 1999 to 2003, he was Consul General of the Russian Federation in Aleppo, Syria.

From 2004 to 2007, he served as a senior adviser on Middle East and North Africa affairs at the Russian Ministry of Foreign Affairs.

From 2007 to 2011, Garaev served as Consul General of the Russian Federation in Erbil, Iraq.

From 2011 to 2014, he was Consul General of the Russian Federation in Basra, Iraq.

On 29 December 2014, he was appointed Ambassador Extraordinary and Plenipotentiary of the Russian Federation to Bahrain.

== Diplomatic rank ==
On 15 January 2002, Garaev was awarded the diplomatic rank of Ambassador Extraordinary and Plenipotentiary Class 2.
