= List of ambassadors of Russia to Grenada =

Ambassador of the Russian Federation to Grenada
- Emblem of the Russian Foreign Ministry
- Ministry of Foreign Affairs; Embassy of Russia in Georgetown
- Style: His Excellency
- Reports to: Minister of Foreign Affairs
- Seat: Georgetown
- Appointer: President of Russia
- Term length: At the pleasure of the president
- Website: Embassy of Russia in Guyana

The ambassador extraordinary and plenipotentiary of Russia to Grenada is the official representative of the president and the government of the Russian Federation to the king and the government of Grenada.

The ambassador and his staff work at large in the Embassy of Russia in Georgetown. The post of Russian ambassador to Grenada is currently vacant. The ambassador to Guyana has historically had dual accreditation as the non-resident ambassador to Grenada, as well as Barbados, Saint Vincent and the Grenadines, and Trinidad and Tobago. The current ambassador has, as of December 2025, only been accredited to Saint Vincent and the Grenadines, and Trinidad and Tobago, in addition to Guyana.

== History of diplomatic relations ==
Diplomatic relations between the Soviet Union and Grenada were established on 7 September 1979. Relations were initially handled through the Soviet embassy in Jamaica, with the ambassador to Jamaica, Dmitry Musin, appointed on 28 April 1980. The embassy in St. George's was opened in 1982, and Gennady Sazhenev was appointed as the first ambassador solely accredited to Grenada. A period of political instability began shortly afterwards, culminating in the United States invasion of Grenada in October 1983, and the breaking off of diplomatic relations by the new Grenadian government on 4 November 1983. Relations remained broken until their restoration on 17 September 2002, by which time the dissolution of the Soviet Union had taken place, and the Russian Federation been recognized as its successor state. Relations were handled through the Russian embassy in Guyana, with the Russian ambassador to Guyana having dual accreditation as non-resident ambassador to Grenada.

== List of representatives (1980–present) ==
=== Soviet Union to Grenada (1980-1991) ===
Name	Title	Appointment	Termination	Notes
Dmitry Musin	Ambassador	28 April 1980	17 September 1982	Concurrently ambassador to Jamaica; Credentials presented on 3 June 1980
Gennady Sazhenev	Ambassador	17 September 1982	7 June 1984	Credentials presented on 21 September 1982
United States invasion of Grenada - Diplomatic relations interrupted (1983-2002)

=== Russian Federation to Grenada (2007-present) ===
Name	Title	Appointment	Termination	Notes
Pavel Sergiyev	Ambassador	27 July 2007	21 February 2011	Concurrently ambassador to Guyana
Nikolai Smirnov	Ambassador	24 November 2011	6 December 2017	Concurrently ambassador to Guyana; Credentials presented on 5 April 2012
Aleksandr Kurmaz	Ambassador	1 October 2018	17 June 2025	Concurrently ambassador to Guyana
