= List of ambassadors of Russia to Ethiopia =

Ambassador of the Russian Federation to the Federal Democratic Republic of Ethiopia
- በኢትዮጵያ ፌዴራላዊ ሪ ብሊክ የሩሲያ ፌዴሬሽን አምባሳደር
- Emblem of the Ministry of Foreign Affairs
- Incumbent; Yevgeny Terekhin since 27 March 2019
- Ministry of Foreign Affairs
- Style: His Excellency
- Reports to: Minister of Foreign Affairs
- Residence: The Embassy
- Seat: Addis Ababa
- Appointer: The president
- Term length: At the pleasure of the president
- First holder: Viktor Kozlov
- Website: Russian Embassy - Addis Ababa

The ambassador extraordinary and plenipotentiary of the Russian Federation to the Federal Democratic Republic of Ethiopia is the official representative of the government of Russia to the government of Ethiopia.

The ambassador and his staff work at large in the Embassy of Russia in Addis Ababa. The ambassador to Ethiopia is concurrently appointed as the Russian representative to the African Union. The post of Russian ambassador to Ethiopia is currently held by Yevgeny Terekhin, incumbent since 27 March 2019.

== Background ==
Russia established diplomatic relations with Ethiopia on 9 August 1897 and sent its first head of mission, Pyotr Vlasov. The successful development of Russo-Ethiopian relations, at least at the first stage (until 1907), was mainly due to the fact that Russia did not participate in the colonial division of Africa and therefore did not pose any threat to Ethiopia. Russia was the great global power and thus a country like Ethiopia needed an ally to continue its existence. As a rival of British Empire and Italy in global and regional politics, Russia objectively became in Ethiopia a political counterbalance to the imperialist plans of these powers. The Russian mission was tasked with "gaining the trust of the Negus and, if possible, protecting him from the intrigues of our political rivals, especially the British, who pursue such ambitious, predatory goals in Africa."

With the end of the tsarist regime in 1917 the diplomatic relations were interrupted, but were resumed by the Soviet Union on 21 April 1943. The first Soviet ambassador, Viktor Kozlov, arrived in the country on 9 March 1944.

== List of representatives (1898 – present) ==
=== Russian Empire to the Ethiopian Empire (1898 – 1917) ===
Name	Title	Appointment	Termination	Notes
Pyotr Vlasov	Head of diplomatic mission	4 February 1898	11 February 1900	
Arkady Orlov	Chargé d'affaires	1900	1902	
Konstantin Lishin	Minister-resident	23 March 1902	15 January 1906	
Sergey Likhachyov	Acting Minister-resident	16 January 1906	February 1907	
Ivan Skarzhinsky	Chargé d'affaires	1907	1908	
Ivan Kruzenshtern	Chargé d'affaires	1908	1910	
Boris Chemerzin	Chargé d'affaires	8 April 1910	1917	

=== Soviet Union to Ethiopia (1944 – 1991) ===
Name	Title	Appointment	Termination	Notes
Viktor Kozlov	Envoy	9 March 1944	28 February 1946	Presented credentials on 1 July 1944
Andrey Timoshchenko	Envoy	28 February 1946	24 September 1948	Presented credentials on 23 May 1946
Vasily Rybakov	Envoy	24 September 1948	13 December 1953	Presented credentials on 28 December 1948
Aleksey Korobochkin	Envoy	13 December 1953	22 November 1955	Presented credentials on 13 February 1954
Borish Karavayev	Envoy (before 22 June 1956); Ambassador (after 22 June 1956)	22 November 1955	13 October 1959	Presented credentials on 14 February 1956
Arkady Budakov	Ambassador	13 October 1959	26 July 1965	Presented credentials on 23 October 1959
Leonid Teplov	Ambassador	26 July 1965	2 January 1969	Presented credentials on 8 October 1965
Aleksey Shchiborin	Ambassador	2 January 1969	14 December 1973	Presented credentials on 27 March 1969
Anatoly Ratanov	Ambassador	14 December 1973	28 November 1978	Presented credentials on 14 January 1974
Boris Kirnasovsky	Ambassador	28 November 1978	26 June 1981	Presented credentials on 28 December 1978
Konstantin Fomichenko	Ambassador	25 June 1981	29 March 1985	Presented credentials on 10 July 1981
Gennady Andreyev	Ambassador	29 March 1985	25 February 1986	
Valentin Dimitiev	Ambassador	22 July 1986	15 August 1990	
Lev Mironov	Ambassador	15 August 1990	25 December 1991	

=== Russian Federation to Ethiopia (1991 – present) ===
Name	Title	Appointment	Termination	Notes
Lev Mironov	Ambassador	25 December 1991	22 May 1995	
Vladimir Volkov	Ambassador	22 May 1995	9 July 1999	
Valery Lipnyakov	Ambassador	9 July 1999	28 February 2005	
Mikhail Afanasyev	Ambassador	28 February 2005	29 October 2010	
Valery Utkin	Ambassador	29 October 2010	23 June 2014	
Vsevolod Tkachenko	Ambassador	23 June 2014	27 March 2019	
Yevgeny Terekhin	Ambassador	27 March 2019		

== See also ==
- Foreign relations of Ethiopia
- List of diplomatic missions in Ethiopia
- List of ambassadors from Russia
