= List of ambassadors of Russia to Antigua and Barbuda =

Ambassador of the Russian Federation to Antigua and Barbuda
- Emblem of the Russian Foreign Ministry
- Incumbent; Sergei Petrovich since 24 May 2021
- Ministry of Foreign Affairs; Embassy of Russia in Kingston
- Style: His Excellency; The Honourable
- Reports to: Minister of Foreign Affairs
- Seat: Kingston
- Appointer: President of Russia
- Term length: At the pleasure of the president
- Formation: 1990
- First holder: Vladimir Romanchenko
- Website: Embassy of Russia in Jamaica

The ambassador extraordinary and plenipotentiary of the Russian Federation to Antigua and Barbuda is the official representative of the president and the government of the Russian Federation to the prime minister and the government of Antigua and Barbuda.

The Russian ambassador to Antigua and Barbuda is a non-resident ambassador, who holds the post of ambassador to Jamaica, where he and his staff work at large in the Embassy of Russia in Kingston. The ambassador holds dual accreditation to Jamaica, Antigua and Barbuda, Dominica, Saint Lucia, and Saint Kitts and Nevis.

The post of Russian ambassador to Antigua and Barbuda is currently held by Sergei Petrovich, incumbent since 24 May 2021.

== History of diplomatic relations ==
The formal establishment of diplomatic relations between the Soviet Union and Antigua and Barbuda took place in January 1990. The incumbent Soviet ambassador to Jamaica, Vladimir Romanchenko, was appointed to serve concurrently as ambassador to Antigua and Barbuda on 20 August 1990. With the dissolution of the Soviet Union in 1991 Romanchenko continued as representative of the Russian Federation until 1994.

== List of representatives (1990–present) ==
=== Soviet Union to Antigua and Barbuda (1990–1991) ===
Name	Title	Appointment	Termination	Notes
Vladimir Romanchenko	Ambassador	20 August 1990	25 December 1991	

=== Russian Federation to Antigua and Barbuda (1991–present) ===
Name	Title	Appointment	Termination	Notes
Vladimir Romanchenko	Ambassador	25 December 1991	5 January 1994	
Igor Yakovlev	Ambassador	5 January 1994	8 May 1998	
Nikolai Vladimir	Ambassador	8 May 1998	5 August 2000	
Eduard Malayan	Ambassador	12 August 2000	28 February 2005	
Igor Lebedev	Ambassador	28 February 2005	24 March 2006	
Viktor Zotin	Ambassador	14 December 2006	20 February 2012	
Vladimir Polyenov	Ambassador	20 February 2012	14 March 2016	
Vladimir Vinokurov	Ambassador	14 March 2016	24 May 2021	
Sergei Petrovich	Ambassador	24 May 2021		
