= List of ambassadors of Russia to Bahrain =

Ambassador of the Russian Federation to the Kingdom of Bahrain
- Emblem of the Russian Foreign Ministry
- Incumbent; Aleksei Skosyrev since 9 August 2022
- Ministry of Foreign Affairs; Embassy of Russia in Manama
- Style: His Excellency; The Honourable
- Reports to: Minister of Foreign Affairs
- Seat: Manama
- Appointer: President of Russia
- Term length: At the pleasure of the president
- Formation: 1991
- Website: Embassy of Russia in Bahrain

The ambassador extraordinary and plenipotentiary of the Russian Federation to the Kingdom of Bahrain is the official representative of the president and the government of the Russian Federation to the king and the government of Bahrain.

The ambassador and his staff work at large in the Embassy of Russia in Manama. The post of Russian ambassador to Bahrain is currently held by Aleksei Skosyrev, incumbent since 9 August 2022.

== History of diplomatic relations ==
Diplomatic relations at the mission level between the Soviet Union and Bahrain were first established on 29 September 1990. The first Soviet ambassador was appointed in April 1991, and presented his credentials on 30 July 1991.

== List of representatives (1990–present) ==
=== Soviet Union to the Kingdom of Bahrain (1990–1991) ===
Name	Title	Appointment	Termination	Notes
Anatoly Gavryushenko	Ambassador	15 February 1991	1991	

=== Russian Federation to the Kingdom of Bahrain (1991–present) ===
Name	Title	Appointment	Termination	Notes
Aleksandr Novozhilov	Ambassador	15 October 1993	2 July 1998	
Valery Vlasov	Ambassador	2 July 1998	13 May 2003	
Yuri Antonov	Ambassador	13 May 2003	28 January 2008	
Viktor Smirnov	Ambassador	28 January 2008	29 December 2014	
Vagif Garaev	Ambassador	29 December 2014	19 September 2018	
Igor Kremnev	Ambassador	19 September 2018	9 August 2022	
Aleksei Skosyrev	Ambassador	9 August 2022		
