= List of ambassadors of Russia to Vanuatu =

Ambassador of the Russian Federation to the Republic of Vanuatu
- Emblem of the Russian Foreign Ministry
- Incumbent; Aleksey Pavlovsky since 17 September 2019
- Ministry of Foreign Affairs; Embassy of Russia in Canberra
- Style: His Excellency; The Honourable
- Reports to: Minister of Foreign Affairs
- Seat: Canberra
- Appointer: President of Russia
- Term length: At the pleasure of the president
- First holder: Yevgeny Samoteykin
- Website: Embassy of Russia in Australia

The ambassador extraordinary and plenipotentiary of the Russian Federation to the Republic of Vanuatu is the official representative of the president and the government of the Russian Federation to the prime minister and the government of Vanuatu.

The Russian ambassador to Vanuatu is a non-resident ambassador, who holds the post of ambassador to Australia, where he and his staff work at large in the Embassy of Russia in Canberra. The ambassador holds dual accreditation to Australia, Fiji, Nauru, Tuvalu and Vanuatu.

The post of Russian ambassador to Vanuatu is currently held by Aleksey Pavlovsky, incumbent since 17 September 2019.

== History of diplomatic relations ==
The formal establishment of diplomatic relations between the Soviet Union and Vanuatu took place on 30 June 1986. The incumbent Soviet ambassador to Australia, Yevgeny Samoteykin, was appointed to serve concurrently as ambassador to Vanuatu on 3 September 1986. With the dissolution of the Soviet Union in 1991 the incumbent ambassador, Vyacheslav Dolgov, continued as representative of the Russian Federation until 1993.

== List of representatives (1986–present) ==
=== Soviet Union to Vanuatu (1986–1991) ===
Name	Title	Appointment	Termination	Notes
Yevgeny Samoteykin	Ambassador	3 September 1986	28 August 1990	
Vyacheslav Dolgov	Ambassador	28 August 1990	25 December 1991	

=== Russian Federation to Vanuatu (1991–present) ===
Name	Title	Appointment	Termination	Notes
Vyacheslav Dolgov	Ambassador	25 December 1991	11 November 1993	
Alexander Losyukov	Ambassador	11 November 1993	6 September 1997	
Rashit Khamidulin	Ambassador	31 August 1998	20 July 2001	
Leonid Moiseyev	Ambassador	20 July 2001	10 November 2005	
Alexander Blokhin	Ambassador	10 November 2005	29 June 2010	
Vladimir Morozov	Ambassador	29 June 2010	28 July 2016	
Grigory Logvinov	Ambassador	29 June 2017	3 April 2019	
Aleksey Pavlovsky	Ambassador	17 September 2019		
