= List of ambassadors of Russia to the Central African Republic =

Ambassador of the Russian Federation to the Central African Republic
- Emblem of the Russian Foreign Ministry
- Incumbent; Aleksandr Bikantov since 10 January 2022
- Ministry of Foreign Affairs; Embassy of Russia in Bangui
- Style: His Excellency; The Honourable
- Reports to: Minister of Foreign Affairs
- Seat: Bangui
- Appointer: President of Russia
- Term length: At the pleasure of the president
- Website: Embassy of Russia in the Central African Republic

The ambassador of Russia to the Central African Republic is the official representative of the president and the government of the Russian Federation to the president and the government of the Central African Republic.

The ambassador and his staff work at large in the Russian embassy in Bangui. The current Russian ambassador to the Central African Republic is Aleksandr Bikantov, incumbent since 10 January 2022.

== History of diplomatic relations ==
Diplomatic relations between the Soviet Union and the Central African Republic were established on 7 December 1960. The first ambassador, Maksim Kuchmin, was appointed on 10 February 1965. The Central African Republic became the Central African Empire in 1976, under the leadership of Jean-Bédel Bokassa, self-proclaimed Emperor of Central Africa. Bokassa was overthrown in 1979, and the country returned to being the Central African Republic. Relations were broken off by the Soviet government on 23 January 1980, and remained broken during a period of military junta rule. Relations were only restored in March 1988, towards the end of the existence of the Soviet Union. The first ambassador since 1980, Yury Balabanov, was appointed on 25 September 1990. With the dissolution of the Soviet Union in 1991, the Central African Republic recognised the Russian Federation as its successor state. Balabanov continued as the ambassador for Russia until 1995.

== List of representatives of Russia to the Central African Republic (1965–present) ==
=== Soviet Union to the Central African Republic (1965–1991) ===
Name	Title	Appointment	Termination	Notes
Maksim Kuchmin	Ambassador	10 February 1965	20 August 1968	Credentials presented on 28 February 1965
Dmitry Zelenov	Ambassador	20 August 1968	21 July 1972	Credentials presented on 23 October 1968
Yevgeny Melnikov	Ambassador	21 July 1972	1 September 1978	Credentials presented on 23 September 1972
Aleksey Naumov	Ambassador	1 September 1978	17 December 1980	Credentials presented on 4 November 1978
Diplomatic relations interrupted (1980-1988)
Yury Balabanov	Ambassador	25 September 1990	25 December 1991	

=== Russian Federation to the Central African Republic (1991–present) ===
Name	Title	Appointment	Termination	Notes
Yury Balabanov	Ambassador	25 December 1991	12 May 1995	
Boris Krasnikov	Ambassador	12 May 1995	14 September 1999	
Aleksandr Kasparov	Ambassador	25 July 2005	15 March 2011	
Sergey Lobanov	Ambassador	15 March 2011	15 January 2019	Credentials presented on 10 June 2011
Vladimir Titorenko	Ambassador	15 January 2019	10 January 2022	Credentials presented on 13 March 2019
Aleksandr Bikantov	Ambassador	10 January 2022		Credentials presented on 9 April 2022
