= Yevgeny Samoteykin =

Soviet diplomat (1928–2014)

Yevgeny Matveyevich Samoteykin (Russian: Евгений Матвеевич Самотейкин; October 18, 1928 – July 20, 2014) was a Soviet diplomat.

From 1952, Samoteykin worked in the central apparatus of the Soviet Ministry of Foreign Affairs and in Soviet diplomatic missions abroad. From 1964 he was a personal assistant to the First (later, General) secretary of the Communist Party of the Soviet Union Central Committee.

On 24 April 1983 he was appointed as Ambassador of the Soviet Union to Australia, with concurrent accreditation to Nauru, Fiji and Vanuatu, and held the post until 22 August 1990.
