= List of ambassadors of Russia to Bangladesh =

Ambassador of the Russian Federation to the People's Republic of Bangladesh
- Emblem of the Russian Foreign Ministry
- Incumbent; Aleksandr Khozin since 30 October 2024
- Ministry of Foreign Affairs; Embassy of Russia in Dhaka
- Style: His Excellency; The Honourable
- Reports to: Minister of Foreign Affairs
- Seat: Dhaka
- Appointer: President of Russia
- Term length: At the pleasure of the president
- Formation: 1972
- First holder: Valentin Popov
- Website: Embassy of Russia in Bangladesh

The ambassador extraordinary and plenipotentiary of the Russian Federation to People's Republic of Bangladesh is the official representative of the president and the government of the Russian Federation to the president and the government of Bangladesh.

The ambassador and his staff work at large in the Embassy of Russia in Dhaka. There is a consulate general in Chittagong. The post of Russian ambassador to Bangladesh is currently held by Aleksandr Khozin, incumbent since 30 October 2024.

== History of diplomatic relations ==
Diplomatic relations at the mission level between the Soviet Union and Bangladesh were first established on 25 January 1972. The first Soviet ambassador, Valentin Popov, was appointed on 16 February 1972. With the dissolution of the Soviet Union in 1991, the Soviet ambassador, Yury Alekseyev, continued as representative of the Russian Federation until 1992.

== List of representatives (1972–present) ==
=== Soviet Union to Bangladesh (1972–1991) ===
Name	Title	Appointment	Termination	Notes
Valentin Popov	Ambassador	16 February 1972	27 February 1973	
Andrey Fomin	Ambassador	27 February 1973	20 February 1976	
Valentin Stepanov	Ambassador	20 February 1976	3 October 1984	
Vladimir Belyayev	Ambassador	3 October 1984	14 October 1988	
Vitaly Smirnov	Ambassador	14 October 1988	21 March 1991	
Yury Alekseyev	Ambassador	21 March 1991	25 December 1991	

=== Russian Federation to Bangladesh (1991–present) ===
Name	Title	Appointment	Termination	Notes
Yury Alekseyev	Ambassador	25 December 1991	1 September 1992	
Eduard Shevchenko	Ambassador	1 September 1992	24 March 1997	
Yevgeni Ivanov	Ambassador	24 March 1997	20 January 2000	
Nikolai Shevchenko	Ambassador	6 May 2000	16 May 2003	
Oleg Malginov	Ambassador	16 May 2003	21 September 2006	
Gennady Trotsenko	Ambassador	21 September 2006	1 February 2012	
Aleksandr Nikolaev	Ambassador	1 February 2012	10 February 2016	
Aleksandr Igantov	Ambassador	10 February 2016	19 May 2021	
Aleksandr Mantytsky	Ambassador	19 May 2021	30 October 2024	
Aleksandr Khozin	Ambassador	30 October 2024		
