= List of ambassadors of Russia to the Holy See =

Ambassador of the Russian Federation to the Holy See
- Emblem of the Russian Foreign Ministry

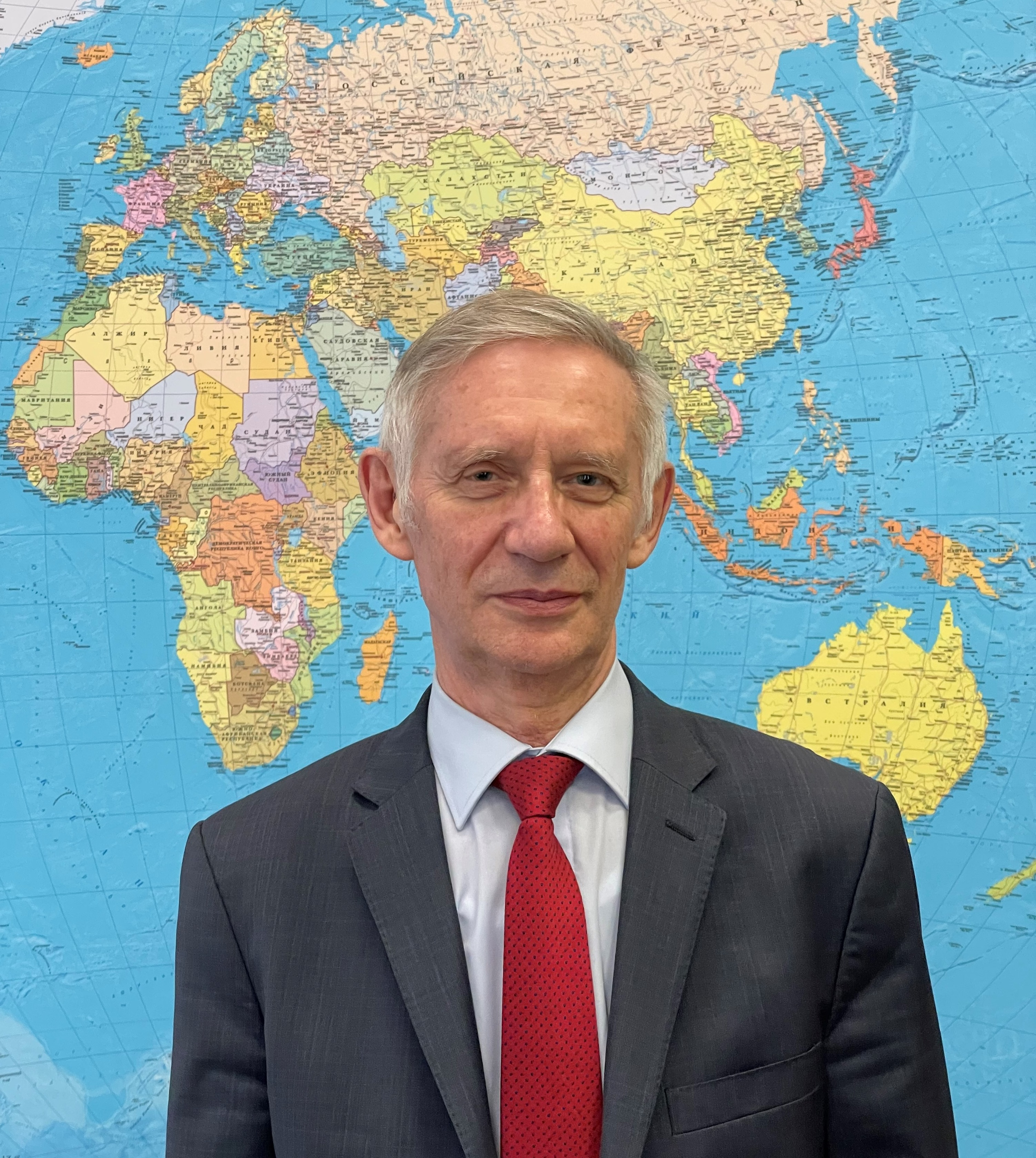
- Incumbent; Ivan Soltanovsky since 16 May 2023
- Ministry of Foreign Affairs
- Style: His Excellency; The Honourable
- Reports to: Minister of Foreign Affairs
- Seat: Rome
- Appointer: President of Russia
- Term length: At the pleasure of the president
- Website: Embassy of Russia in France

The ambassador extraordinary and plenipotentiary of the Russian Federation to the Holy See is the official representative of the president and the government of the Russian Federation to the pope in his capacity as the bishop of Rome, head of the Catholic Church, and head of state of Vatican City.

The post of Russian ambassador to the Holy See is currently held by Ivan Soltanovsky, incumbent since 16 May 2023. In common with many representatives to the Holy See, the ambassador and his staff live and work outside the Vatican City, in Rome. Since 1992, the ambassador to the Holy See has also held the post of representative to the Sovereign Military Order of Malta.

== History of diplomatic relations ==
Formal diplomatic relations between the Holy See and the Soviet Union were only established in 1990, shortly before the dissolution of the Soviet Union. Representatives continued to be appointed by the USSR's successor state, the Russian Federation, and in 2010 the level of relations was raised to that of the exchange of embassies.

== List of representatives (1990–present) ==
=== Soviet Union to the Holy See (1990–1991) ===
Name	Title	Appointment	Termination	Notes
Yury Karlov	Representative	1990	25 December 1991	

=== Russian Federation to the Holy See (1991–present) ===
Name	Title	Appointment	Termination	Notes
Yury Karlov	Representative	25 December 1991	26 May 1995	
Vyacheslav Kostikov	Representative	26 May 1995	19 September 1996	
Gennady Uranov	Representative	19 September 1996	11 January 2001	
Vitaly Litvin	Representative	11 January 2001	26 August 2005	
Nikolai Sadchikov	Representative; Ambassador after 2010	26 August 2005	13 January 2013	
Aleksandr Avdeyev	Ambassador	13 January 2013	16 May 2023	
Ivan Soltanovsky	Ambassador	16 May 2023		
