= List of ambassadors of Russia to Costa Rica =

Ambassador of the Russian Federation to the Republic of Costa Rica
- Emblem of the Russian Foreign Ministry
- Incumbent; Yury Bedzhanyan since 18 March 2019
- Ministry of Foreign Affairs; Embassy of Russia in San José
- Style: His Excellency
- Reports to: Minister of Foreign Affairs
- Seat: San José
- Appointer: President of Russia
- Term length: At the pleasure of the president
- Website: Embassy of Russia in Costa Rica

The ambassador extraordinary and plenipotentiary of Russia to Costa Rica is the official representative of the president and the government of the Russian Federation to the president and the government of Costa Rica.

The ambassador and his staff work at large in the Embassy of Russia in San José. The post of Russian ambassador to Costa Rica is currently held by Yury Bedzhanyan, incumbent since 18 March 2019.

== History of diplomatic relations ==
Diplomatic relations between Costa Rica and the Soviet Union were established on 8 May 1944, when the incumbent representative to Mexico, Konstantin Umansky, was given dual accreditation to Costa Rica. Umansky's tenure was shortlived, when he and several others were killed in a plane crash on 25 January 1945 while travelling to present his credentials to the president of Costa Rica. Following this, it was not until 1970, that the two sides agreed to exchange diplomatic missions. The Russian embassy in San José was opened in 1972, and the Costa Rican embassy in Moscow in 1975. Vladimir Kazimirov was assigned as ambassador to Costa Rica on 15 July 1971.

Representation continued through the late twentieth century. With the dissolution of the Soviet Union, Costa Rica recognized the Russian Federation as its successor state on 28 December 1991. The incumbent Soviet ambassador, Valeriya Kalmyk, continued as the Russian ambassador until 1996.

== List of representatives (1944–present) ==
=== Soviet Union to Costa Rica (1944-1991) ===
Name	Title	Appointment	Termination	Notes
Konstantin Umansky	Envoy	8 July 1944	25 January 1945	Concurrently representative to Mexico; Died in post
Vladimir Kazimirov	Ambassador	15 July 1971	19 April 1975	Credentials presented on 2 February 1972
Dmitry Zelenov	Ambassador	22 April 1975	23 April 1979	Credentials presented on 6 August 1975
Vladmir Chernyshyov	Ambassador	20 August 1979	2 September 1981	Credentials presented on 22 October 1979
Yury Pavlov	Ambassador	3 December 1982	22 July 1987	Credentials presented on 22 December 1982
Vadim Rozanov	Ambassador	22 July 1987	21 March 1991	
Valeriya Kalmyk	Ambassador	21 March 1991	25 December 1991	

=== Russian Federation to Costa Rica (1991-present) ===
Name	Title	Appointment	Termination	Notes
Valeriya Kalmyk	Ambassador	25 December 1991	24 July 1996	
Vladimir Kazimirov	Ambassador	24 July 1996	14 October 1999	
Nikolai Yelizarov	Ambassador	14 October 1999	25 March 2004	
Valery Nikolayenko	Ambassador	25 March 2004	5 November 2008	
Vladimir Kurayev	Ambassador	5 November 2008	6 February 2013	
Aleksandr Dogadin	Ambassador	6 February 2013	18 March 2019	
Yury Bedzhanyan	Ambassador	18 March 2019		Credentials presented on 20 September 2019
