= List of ambassadors of Russia to the Czech Republic =

Ambassador of the Russian Federation to the Czech Republic
- Emblem of the Russian Foreign Ministry
- Incumbent; Anna Ponomaryova since 23 December 2025
- Ministry of Foreign Affairs; Embassy of Russia in Prague
- Style: His Excellency; The Honourable
- Reports to: Minister of Foreign Affairs
- Seat: Prague
- Appointer: President of Russia
- Term length: At the pleasure of the president
- Formation: 1993
- First holder: Aleksandr Lebedev
- Website: Embassy of Russia in the Czech Republic

The ambassador extraordinary and plenipotentiary of the Russian Federation to the Czech Republic is the official representative of the president and the government of the Russian Federation to the president and the government of the Czech Republic.

The ambassador and his staff work at large in the Embassy of Russia in Prague. There are consulates general in Brno and Karlovy Vary, and an honorary consul based in Ostrava. The post of Russian ambassador to the Czech Republic is currently held by Anna Ponomaryova, incumbent since 23 December 2025.

== History of diplomatic relations ==
Diplomatic exchanges between the Soviet Union and Czechoslovakia began with the formal establishment of relations on 5 June 1922. Relations were maintained throughout the twentieth century, with a brief break after the German occupation of Czechoslovakia in 1939, until the reestablishment of relations in 1941. With the repudiation of communism, the country officially became the Czech and Slovak Federative Republic in 1990. With the dissolution of the Soviet Union in 1991, a new ambassador, Aleksandr Lebedev, was appointed as representative of the Russian Federation. He continued as ambassador until the dissolution of Czechoslovakia and its separation into the states of the Czech Republic and Slovakia. Lebedev continued as representative to the Czech Republic until 1996, while a new ambassador, Sergey Yastrzhembsky, was appointed Russian ambassador to Slovakia in June 1993.

== Representatives of the Russian Federation to the Czech Republic (1993–present) ==
Name	Title	Appointment	Termination	Notes
Aleksandr Lebedev	Ambassador	1 January 1993	4 November 1996	
Nikolai Ryabov	Ambassador	12 November 1996	9 September 2000	
Igor Savolsky	Ambassador	27 November 2000	11 March 2004	
Aleksey Fedotov	Ambassador	11 March 2004	30 August 2010	
Sergey Kislyov	Ambassador	30 August 2010	19 February 2016	
Aleksandr Zmeyevsky	Ambassador	19 February 2016	23 December 2025	
Anna Ponomaryova	Ambassador	23 December 2025		
