= List of ambassadors of Russia to Gabon =

Ambassador of the Russian Federation to the Gabonese Republic
- Emblem of the Russian Foreign Ministry
- Incumbent; Dmitry Korepanov since 16 January 2024
- Ministry of Foreign Affairs; Embassy of Russia in Libreville
- Style: His Excellency; The Honourable
- Reports to: Minister of Foreign Affairs
- Seat: Libreville
- Appointer: President of Russia
- Term length: At the pleasure of the president
- Website: Embassy of Russia in Gabon

The ambassador of Russia to Gabon is the official representative of the president and the government of the Russian Federation to the president and the government of Gabon.

The ambassador and his staff work at large in the Russian embassy in Libreville. The current Russian ambassador to Gabon is Dmitry Korepanov, incumbent since 16 January 2024.

== History of diplomatic relations ==
Formal diplomatic relations between Gabon and the Soviet Union were established on 15 October 1973. Vladimir Filatov was appointed as the first ambassador on 23 August 1974. With the dissolution of the Soviet Union in 1991, Gabon recognised the Russian Federation as its successor state. The incumbent Soviet ambassador, Yury Shmanevsky, continued as ambassador from Russia until 1993.

== List of representatives of Russia to Gabon (1974 –present) ==
=== Soviet Union to Gabon (1974 –1991) ===
Name	Title	Appointment	Termination	Notes
Vladimir Filatov	Ambassador	23 August 1974	14 November 1978	Credentials presented on 30 November 1974
Gennady Uranov	Ambassador	14 November 1978	18 July 1982	Credentials presented on 10 January 1979
Latyp Maksurov	Ambassador	18 July 1982	17 August 1987	Credentials presented on 5 October 1982
Yury Shmanevsky	Ambassador	17 August 1987	25 December 1991	

=== Russian Federation to Gabon (1991–present) ===
Name	Title	Appointment	Termination	Notes
Yury Shmanevsky	Ambassador	25 December 1991	5 July 1993	
Yury Leyzarenko	Ambassador	5 July 1993	1 August 1998	
Aleksandr Borisov	Ambassador	1 August 1998	1999	Died in post
Vsevolod Sukhov	Ambassador	9 July 1999	11 November 2003	
Vladimir Prygin	Ambassador	11 November 2003	16 September 2008	
Vladmir Tarabrin	Ambassador	16 September 2008	25 June 2013	
Dmitry Kurakov	Ambassador	25 June 2013	17 August 2020	
Ilyas Iskandarov	Ambassador	17 August 2020	16 January 2024	Credentials presented on 15 October 2020
Dmitry Korepanov	Ambassador	16 January 2024		Credentials presented on 27 June 2024
