= List of ambassadors of Russia to Zimbabwe =

Ambassador of the Russian Federation to the Republic of Zimbabwe
- Emblem of the Russian Foreign Ministry
- Incumbent; Nikolai Krasilnikov since 26 June 2019
- Ministry of Foreign Affairs; Embassy of Russia in Harare
- Style: His Excellency; The Honourable
- Reports to: Minister of Foreign Affairs
- Seat: Harare
- Appointer: President of Russia
- Term length: At the pleasure of the president
- Website: Embassy of Russia in Zimbabwe

The ambassador of Russia to Zimbabwe is the official representative of the president and the government of the Russian Federation to the president and the government of Zimbabwe.

The ambassador and his staff work at large in the Russian embassy in Harare. The current Russian ambassador to Zimbabwe is Nikolai Krasilnikov, incumbent since 26 June 2019. Since 1994, the ambassador to Zimbabwe has had dual accreditation as the non-resident ambassador to Malawi.

== History of diplomatic relations ==
Diplomatic relations between the Soviet Union and Zimbabwe were established on 18 February 1981. The first ambassador, Georgy Ter-Gazaryants, was appointed on 4 July 1981. With the dissolution of the Soviet Union in 1991, Zimbabwe recognised the Russian Federation as its successor state, and the incumbent Soviet ambassador, Yuri Yukalov, continued as the Russian ambassador until 1996. Relations between the Russian Federation and Malawi were established on 2 November 1993, and the Russian ambassador to Zimbabwe was dually accredited to Malawi from 30 November 1994, a practice that has since continued.

== List of representatives of Russia to Zimbabwe (1981–present) ==
=== Ambassadors of the Soviet Union to Zimbabwe (1981–1991) ===
Name	Title	Appointment	Termination	Notes
Georgy Ter-Gazaryants	Ambassador	4 July 1981	18 March 1987	Credentials presented on 6 August 1981
Arkady Glukhov	Ambassador	18 March 1987	13 September 1990	
Yuri Yukalov	Ambassador	13 September 1990	25 December 1991	

=== Ambassadors of the Russian Federation to Zimbabwe (1991–present) ===
Name	Title	Appointment	Termination	Notes
Yuri Yukalov	Ambassador	25 December 1991	8 August 1996	
Leonid Safonov	Ambassador	8 August 1996	24 July 2001	
Oleg Shcherbak	Ambassador	24 July 2001	14 September 2007	
Sergey Kryukov	Ambassador	14 September 2007	15 December 2010	
Andrey Kushakov	Ambassador	15 December 2010	13 March 2012	
Sergey Bakharev	Ambassador	26 March 2013	26 June 2019	Credentials presented on 19 June 2013
Nikolai Krasilnikov	Ambassador	26 June 2019		Credentials presented on 30 October 2019
