= List of ambassadors of Russia to Nicaragua =

Ambassador of the Russian Federation to the Republic of Nicaragua
- Emblem of the Russian Foreign Ministry
- Incumbent; Mikhail Ledenyov since 15 August 2024
- Ministry of Foreign Affairs; Embassy of Russia in Managua
- Style: His Excellency
- Reports to: Minister of Foreign Affairs
- Seat: Managua
- Appointer: President of Russia
- Term length: At the pleasure of the president
- Website: Embassy of Russia in Nicaragua

The ambassador extraordinary and plenipotentiary of Russia to Nicaragua is the official representative of the president and the government of the Russian Federation to the president and the government of Nicaragua.

The ambassador and his staff work at large in the Embassy of Russia in Managua. The post of Russian ambassador to Nicaragua is currently held by Mikhail Ledenyov, incumbent since 15 August 2024. The ambassador to Nicaragua has dual accreditation as the non-resident ambassador to El Salvador and Honduras.

== History of diplomatic relations ==
Diplomatic relations between the Soviet Union and Nicaragua were first established in 1944, though this did not lead to the exchange of representatives. It was not until 18 October 1979, that an agreement to exchange ambassadors was reached, and the first ambassador, German Shlyapnikov, was appointed on 1 March 1980. With the dissolution of the Soviet Union, Nicaragua recognized the Russian Federation as its successor state. The incumbent Soviet ambassador, Yevgeny Astakhov, continued as the Russian ambassador until 1995. Relations with Honduras were established in 1990, and with El Salvador in 1992, with the ambassador to Nicaragua dually accredited to both, an arrangement that has since continued.

== List of representatives (1980–present) ==
=== Soviet Union to Nicaragua (1980-1991) ===
Name	Title	Appointment	Termination	Notes
German Shlyapnikov	Ambassador	1 March 1980	28 April 1986	Credentials presented on 16 April 1980
Vaino Väljas	Ambassador	28 April 1986	8 June 1988	
Valery Nikolayenko	Ambassador	8 September 1988	14 August 1990	
Yevgeny Astakhov	Ambassador	14 August 1990	25 December 1991	

=== Russian Federation to Nicaragua (1991-present) ===
Name	Title	Appointment	Termination	Notes
Yevgeny Astakhov	Ambassador	25 December 1991	24 October 1995	
Andrey Dmitriyev	Ambassador	24 October 1995	9 March 1999	
Anatoly Kuznetsov	Ambassador	9 March 1999	11 October 2001	
Igor Dyakonov	Ambassador	15 January 2002	10 October 2005	
Igor Kondrashyov	Ambassador	10 October 2005	4 October 2011	
Nikolai Vladimir	Ambassador	4 October 2011	9 February 2016	
Andrey Budayev	Ambassador	9 February 2016	5 October 2020	Credentials presented on 5 December 2016
Aleksandr Khokholikov	Ambassador	5 October 2020	15 August 2024	Credentials presented on 15 December 2020
Mikhail Ledenyov	Ambassador	15 August 2024		
