= List of ambassadors of Russia to Panama =

Ambassador of the Russian Federation to the Republic of Panama
- Emblem of the Russian Foreign Ministry
- Incumbent; Konstantin Gavrilov since 8 October 2024
- Ministry of Foreign Affairs; Embassy of Russia in Panama City
- Style: His Excellency
- Reports to: Minister of Foreign Affairs
- Seat: Panama City
- Appointer: President of Russia
- Term length: At the pleasure of the president
- Website: Embassy of Russia in Panama

The ambassador extraordinary and plenipotentiary of the Russian Federation to the Republic of Panama is the official representative of the president and the government of the Russian Federation to the president and the government of Panama.

The ambassador and his staff work at large in the Embassy of Russia in Panama City. The post of Russian ambassador to Panama is currently held by Konstantin Gavrilov, incumbent since 8 October 2024.

== History of diplomatic relations ==
Diplomatic relations between Panama and the Soviet Union were established on 29 March 1991, though it was not until August 1996 that the first Russian ambassador, Sergey Gurov, was appointed.

== List of representatives (1996–present) ==
| Name | Title | Appointment | Termination | Notes |
|---|---|---|---|---|
| Sergey Gurov | Ambassador | 23 August 1996 | 5 August 2000 | |
| Nikolai Vladimir | Ambassador | 5 August 2000 | 14 January 2004 | |
| Yevgeny Voronin | Ambassador | 14 January 2004 | 7 July 2009 | |
| Aleksey Yermakov | Ambassador | 7 July 2009 | 17 December 2015 | |
| Boris Marchuk | Ambassador | 17 December 2015 | 1 October 2018 | |
| Yevgeny Boykov | Ambassador | 1 October 2018 | 8 October 2024 | |
| Konstantin Gavrilov | Ambassador | 8 October 2024 | | |
