= List of ambassadors of Russia to the Republic of the Congo =

Ambassador of the Russian Federation to the Republic of the Congo
- Ambassadeur Extraordinaire et Plénipotentiaire de la Fédération de Russie en République du Congo
- Emblem of the Russian Foreign Ministry

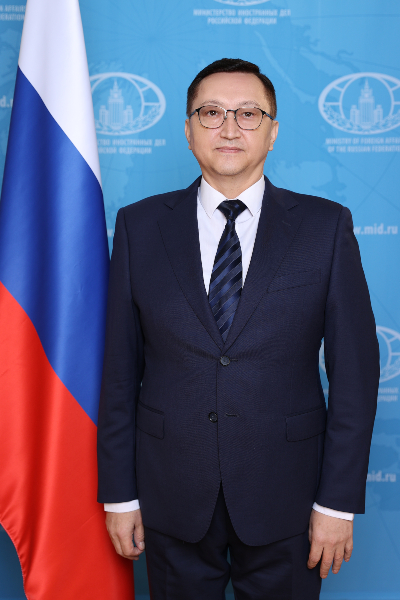
- Incumbent; Ilyas Iskandarov since 16 January 2024
- Ministry of Foreign Affairs; Embassy of Russia in Brazzaville
- Style: His Excellency; The Honourable
- Reports to: Minister of Foreign Affairs
- Seat: Brazzaville
- Appointer: President of Russia
- Term length: At the pleasure of the president
- Website: Embassy of Russia in the Republic of the Congo

The ambassador of Russia to the Republic of the Congo is the official representative of the president and the government of the Russian Federation to the president and the government of the Republic of the Congo.

The ambassador and his staff work at large in the Russian embassy in Brazzaville. The current Russian ambassador to the Republic of the Congo is Ilyas Iskandarov, incumbent since 16 January 2024.

== History of diplomatic relations ==
Formal diplomatic relations between the Republic of the Congo and the Soviet Union were established on 16 March 1964. The first ambassador, Ivan Spitsky, was appointed on 21 July 1964. Exchange of ambassadors continued throughout the rest of the existence of the Soviet Union. With the dissolution of the Soviet Union in 1991, the incumbent Soviet ambassador, Anatoly Zaytsev, continued in post as the Russian ambassador until 1994.

== List of representatives of Russia to the Republic of the Congo (1964–present) ==
=== Soviet Union to the Republic of the Congo (1964–1991) ===
Name	Title	Appointment	Termination	Notes
Ivan Spitsky	Ambassador	21 July 1964	15 February 1969	Credentials presented on 5 August 1964
Arkady Budakov	Ambassador	15 February 1969	24 May 1972	Credentials presented on 25 April 1969
Yevgeny Afanasenko	Ambassador	24 May 1972	18 September 1978	Credentials presented on 29 July 1972
Sergey Kuznetsov	Ambassador	18 September 1978	6 June 1982	Credentials presented on 19 October 1978
Vladimir Lobachyov	Ambassador	6 June 1982	20 November 1989	Credentials presented on 23 August 1982
Anatoly Zaytsev	Ambassador	20 November 1989	25 December 1991	

=== Russian Federation to the Republic of the Congo (1991–present) ===
Name	Title	Appointment	Termination	Notes
Anatoly Zaytsev	Ambassador	25 December 1991	5 July 1994	
Nikolai Sizykh	Ambassador	5 July 1994	31 May 1999	
Sergey Nenashev	Ambassador	31 May 1999	11 November 2003	
Mikhail Tsvigun	Ambassador	11 November 2003	15 October 2009	
Yury Romanov	Ambassador	15 October 2009	7 April 2014	Credentials presented on 26 March 2010
Valery Mikhailov	Ambassador	7 April 2014	17 July 2019	Credentials presented on 4 June 2014
Georgy Chepik	Ambassador	17 July 2019	16 January 2024	Credentials presented on 13 September 2019
Ilyas Iskandarov	Ambassador	16 January 2024		Credentials presented on 22 April 2024
