= List of ambassadors of Russia to Slovakia =

Ambassador of the Russian Federation to the Slovak Republic
- Emblem of the Russian Foreign Ministry
- Incumbent; Sergey Andreyev since 2 December 2025
- Ministry of Foreign Affairs; Embassy of Russia in Bratislava
- Style: His Excellency; The Honourable
- Reports to: Minister of Foreign Affairs
- Seat: Bratislava
- Appointer: President of Russia
- Term length: At the pleasure of the president
- Formation: 1993
- First holder: Sergey Yastrzhembsky
- Website: Embassy of Russia in Slovakia

The ambassador extraordinary and plenipotentiary of the Russian Federation to the Slovak Republic is the official representative of the president and the government of the Russian Federation to the president and the government of Slovakia.

The ambassador and his staff work at large in the Embassy of Russia in Bratislava. There is also an honorary consul based in Košice. The post of Russian ambassador to Slovakia is currently held by Sergey Andreyev, incumbent since 2 December 2025.

== History of diplomatic relations ==
Diplomatic exchanges between the Soviet Union and Czechoslovakia began with the formal establishment of relations on 5 June 1922. Relations were maintained throughout the twentieth century, with a brief break after the German occupation of Czechoslovakia in 1939, until the reestablishment of relations in 1941. With the repudiation of communism, the country officially became the Czech and Slovak Federative Republic in 1990. With the dissolution of the Soviet Union in 1991, a new ambassador, Aleksandr Lebedev, was appointed as representative of the Russian Federation. He continued as ambassador until the dissolution of Czechoslovakia and its separation into the states of the Czech Republic and Slovakia. Lebedev continued to representative to the Czech Republic until 1996, while a new ambassador, Sergey Yastrzhembsky, was appointed Russian ambassador to Slovakia in June 1993.

== Representatives of the Russian Federation to Slovakia (1993–present) ==
Name	Title	Appointment	Termination	Notes
Sergey Yastrzhembsky	Ambassador	3 June 1993	30 August 1996	
Sergey Zotov	Ambassador	25 November 1996	11 September 1998	
Aleksandr Aksenyonok	Ambassador	11 November 1998	14 August 2002	
Aleksey Borodavkin	Ambassador	14 August 2002	9 April 2004	
Aleksandr Udaltsov	Ambassador	16 June 2005	20 April 2010	
Pavel Kuznetsov	Ambassador	20 April 2010	10 September 2014	
Aleksey Fedotov	Ambassador	10 September 2014	23 October 2020	
Igor Bratchikov	Ambassador	23 October 2020	2 December 2025	
Sergey Andreyev	Ambassador	2 December 2025		
