= List of ambassadors of Russia to Indonesia =

Ambassador of the Russian Federation to the Republic of Indonesia
- Duta Besar Federasi Rusia untuk Republik Indonesia
- Emblem of the Ministry of Foreign Affairs

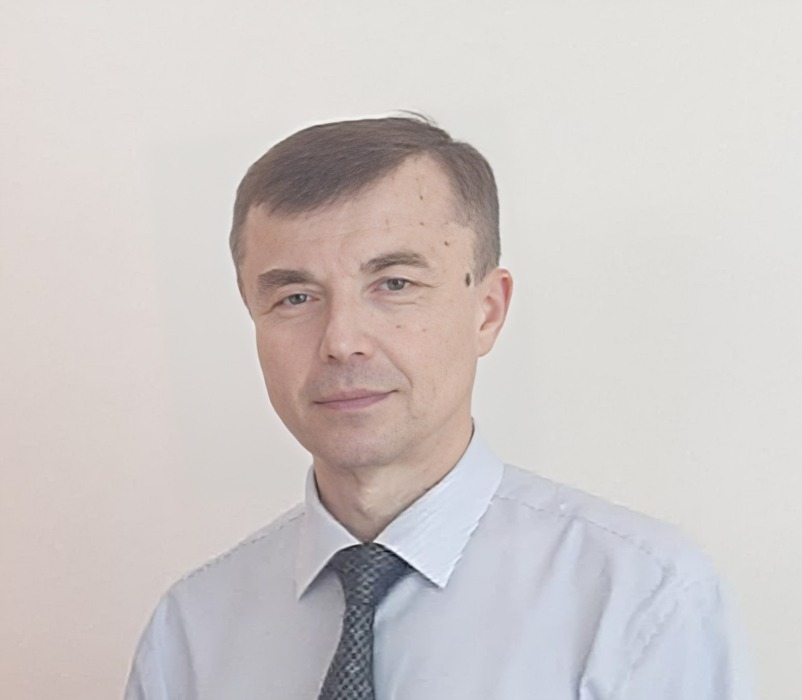
- Incumbent; Sergey Tolchenov since 14 May 2024
- Ministry of Foreign Affairs
- Style: His Excellency
- Reports to: Minister of Foreign Affairs
- Residence: Embassy of Russia in Jakarta
- Seat: Jakarta
- Appointer: The president
- Term length: At the pleasure of the president
- Formation: 7 July 1954
- First holder: Dmitry Zhukov
- Website: Embassy of Russia in Jakarta

The ambassador extraordinary and plenipotentiary of the Russian Federation to the Republic of Indonesia is the official representative of the president and the government of Russia to the president and the government of Indonesia.

The ambassador and her staff work at large in the Embassy of Russia in Jakarta in Indonesia. There is a consulate in Denpasar. The current Russian ambassador to Indonesia is Sergey Tolchenov, incumbent since 14 May 2024. The ambassador of Russia to Indonesia is concurrently accredited to East Timor, Papua New Guinea and Kiribati.

== Background ==
Relations between Russia and Indonesia date back to the mid-19th century when the Russian frigate Pallada visited Java and the surrounding islands. The Russian writer Ivan Goncharov was on this voyage, and described the region as "the most luxurious corner of the world." In 1869, the Russian traveller V. Tatarinov visited the island of Java, later describing his trip in Sea Collection.

The territory of present day-Indonesia was part of the Dutch East Indies, a colony of the Netherlands, from 1800 until 1942. The Japanese forces invaded in March 1942, expelled the Dutch forces, and occupied the Dutch East Indies. After the defeat and surrender of Japan in August 1945, Sukarno immediately declared the independence of Indonesia from Dutch rule on 17 August 1945. This led the Dutch to declare war on the Indonesian separatists, and attempt to re-establish colonial rule over Indonesia. After four and a half years of fighting the Netherlands formally recognized Indonesian sovereignty in December 1949.

The Soviet Union (and later Russia) recognized Indonesian independence and established diplomatic relations in 1950. Dmitry Zhukov was appointed as the first Russian ambassador to the country.

=== Timeline of diplomatic relations ===
- 22 May 1948 — Consular relations were established.
- 26 January — 3 February 1950 - diplomatic relations established.
- 30 November — 17 December 1953 - Diplomatic relations established at the level of embassies.

== List of representatives (1954–present) ==
=== Soviet Union to Indonesia (1954–1991) ===
Name	Title	Appointment	Termination	Notes
Dmitry Zhukov	Ambassador	7 July 1954	24 August 1958	
Boris Volkov	Ambassador	24 August 1958	2 July 1960	
Nikolai Mikhailov	Ambassador	2 July 1960	27 April 1965	
Mikhail Sytenko	Ambassador	27 April 1965	24 July 1969	
Mikhail Volkov	Ambassador	24 July 1969	10 June 1972	
Pavel Kuzentsov	Ambassador	10 June 1972	2 June 1976	
Ivan Shpedko	Ambassador	2 June 1976	4 December 1983	
Stanislav Semivolos	Ambassador	20 April 1984	20 March 1987	
Vladimir Semyonov	Ambassador	20 March 1987	22 June 1990	
Valery Malygin	Ambassador	22 June 1990	25 December 1991	

=== Russian Federation to Indonesia (1991–present) ===
Name	Title	Appointment	Termination	Notes
Valery Malygin	Ambassador	25 December 1991	13 September 1995	
Nikolai Solovyov	Ambassador	13 September 1995	29 September 1998	
Vladimir Plotnikov	Ambassador	7 September 1999	6 October 2004	
Mikhail Bely	Ambassador	6 October 2004	19 January 2007	
Aleksandr Ivanov	Ambassador	2 February 2007	11 October 2012	
Mikhail Galuzin	Ambassador	11 October 2012	29 January 2018	
Lyudmila Vorobyova	Ambassador	15 February 2018	1 March 2024	
Sergey Tolchenov	Ambassador	14 May 2024		

== See also ==
- List of diplomatic missions of Russia
- Foreign relations of Indonesia
- List of ambassadors from Russia
