= List of ambassadors of Russia to Uruguay =

Coordinates: 34.913683°S 56.153757°W

Ambassador of the Russian Federation to the Oriental Republic of Uruguay
- Emblem of the Russian Foreign Ministry
- Incumbent; Aleksey Isakov since 22 April 2025
- Ministry of Foreign Affairs; Embassy of Russia in Montevideo
- Style: His Excellency
- Reports to: Minister of Foreign Affairs
- Seat: Montevideo
- Appointer: President of Russia
- Term length: At the pleasure of the president
- Website: Embassy of Russia in Uruguay

The ambassador extraordinary and plenipotentiary of the Russian Federation to the Oriental Republic of Uruguay is the official representative of the president and the government of the Russian Federation to the president and the government of Uruguay.

The ambassador and his staff work at large in the Embassy of Russia in Montevideo. The ambassador to Uruguay is concurrently appointed as the Russian representative to the Latin American Integration Association. The post of Russian ambassador to Uruguay is currently held by Aleksey Isakov, incumbent since 22 April 2025.

== History of diplomatic relations ==
Diplomatic relations at the mission level between the Soviet Union and Uruguay were first established in August 1926, although the missions were not opened until August 1933. The first representative, Aleksandr Minkin, was appointed on 10 March 1934, and presented his credentials on 9 May 1934. Diplomatic relations were broken off by the government of Uruguay on 27 December 1935 and Minkin was recalled. Relations were re-established on 27 January 1943, with Sergei Orlov appointed envoy on 3 November 1943. On 30 November 1964 the mission was upgraded to the level of an embassy. With the dissolution of the Soviet Union in 1991, the Soviet ambassador, Igor Laptev, continued as representative of the Russian Federation until 1993.

== List of representatives (1934–present) ==
=== Soviet Union to Uruguay (1934–1991) ===
Name	Title	Appointment	Termination	Notes
Aleksandr Minkin	Diplomatic representative	10 March 1934	27 December 1935	Credentials presented 9 May 1934^{[a]}
Diplomatic relations interrupted (1935 - 1943)
Sergei Orlov	Envoy	3 November 1943	24 October 1944	Credentials presented 18 March 1944^{[b]}
Nikolai Gorelkin	Envoy	12 November 1944	17 May 1952	Credentials presented 14 February 1945
Vladimir Yerofeyev	Envoy	17 May 1952	27 October 1953	
Sergei Mikhailov	Envoy	24 December 1955	14 December 1960	Credentials presented 26 January 1956
Sergei Striganov	Envoy (before 19 December 1964); Ambassador (after 19 December 1964)	14 December 1960	3 August 1965	Credentials presented 24 March 1961^{[c]}
Igor Kolosovsky	Ambassador	3 August 1965	27 January 1970	Credentials presented 1 October 1965
Nikolai Demidov	Ambassador	10 June 1970	23 June 1978	Credentials presented 13 July 1970^{[d]}
Yuri Lebedev	Ambassador	23 June 1978	26 February 1987	Credentials presented 6 November 1978
Igor Laptev	Ambassador	26 February 1987	25 December 1991	

=== Russian Federation to Uruguay (1991–present) ===
Name	Title	Appointment	Termination	Notes
Igor Laptev	Ambassador	25 December 1991	6 April 1993	
Boris Golovin	Ambassador	6 April 1993	13 April 1999	
Yevgeny Astakhov	Ambassador	13 April 1999	31 July 2000	
Yan Burlyai	Ambassador	31 July 2000	26 September 2005	^{[e]}
Sergei Koshkin	Ambassador	26 September 2005	5 November 2013	
Aleksei Labetsky	Ambassador	5 November 2013	10 January 2018	
Nikolai Sofinsky	Ambassador	10 January 2018	5 October 2020	
Andrey Budayev	Ambassador	5 October 2020	22 April 2025	
Aleksey Isakov	Ambassador	22 April 2025		

== Notes ==
a. Alexandre Minkine, The Brazilian Government claimed an involvement in the Brazilian uprising of 1935 therefore rupture of diplomatic relations.

b. Sergei A. Orlov (1895 died in 1944 in Montevideo), 1944 (5) MARCH 5— Sergei Orlov, first Russian Minister to Uruguay after a five-year interruption in Russian-Uruguayan diplomatic relations, arrives in Montevideo. (Uruguay and the USSR re-established diplomatic relations in 1943.)

c. S.R. Striganov Appointed Soviet Ambassador to Argentina Pravda, 27/9/78. the Presidium of the USSR Supreme Soviet has appointed Sergei Romanovich Striganov (born 1916) ambassador to the Argentine Republic, replacing Semen Petrovich Dyukarev, 64, who is retiring. Striganov is one of the most experienced Soviet diplomats in the field of relations with the … in Montevideo and Moscow were elevated to embassies, Striganov became the first Soviet ambassador to Uruguay.

d. Vladimir Demidov ExteriorM - Uruguay Archivo Hiatórico Dipiomático Carta del Embajador de la URSS en eI Uruguay, Sr.N.V.Demidov 127 Documento 52 – 27.08.1972.

e. Yan Anastasyevich Burlyai Y.A., b. 1947, a Ukrainian by birth, in 1965-1970 studied at the Moscow State Institute of International Relations of the Ministry of
