= List of ambassadors of Russia to Eritrea =

Ambassador of the Russian Federation to the State of Eritrea
- Emblem of the Russian Foreign Ministry
- Incumbent; Oleg Petrenko since 25 March 2025
- Ministry of Foreign Affairs; Embassy of Russia in Asmara
- Style: His Excellency; The Honourable
- Reports to: Minister of Foreign Affairs
- Seat: Asmara
- Appointer: President of Russia
- Term length: At the pleasure of the president
- Website: Embassy of Russia in Eritrea

The ambassador of Russia to Eritrea is the official representative of the president and the government of the Russian Federation to the president and the government of Eritrea.

The ambassador and his staff work at large in the Russian embassy in Asmara. The current Russian ambassador to Eritrea is Oleg Petrenko, incumbent since 25 March 2025.

== History of diplomatic relations ==
Formal diplomatic relations between Eritrea and Russia were established on 24 May 1993. The Russian embassy in Asmara opened in June 1994, with the Eritrean embassy in Moscow opening in 1996. Rashid Ibragimov was appointed as the first ambassador on 12 May 1995. Exchange of ambassadors continued throughout the following years.

== List of representatives of Russia to Eritrea (1995 –present) ==
Name	Title	Appointment	Termination	Notes
Rashid Ibragimov	Ambassador	12 May 1995	5 May 1999	
Aleksandr Oblov	Ambassador	6 August 1999	24 September 2004	
Nikolai Trutsuk	Ambassador	24 September 2004	25 February 2009	
Igor Chubarov	Ambassador	25 February 2009	19 January 2015	
Azim Yarkhmedov	Ambassador	19 January 2015	17 May 2021	Credentials presented on 14 August 2015
Igor Mozgo	Ambassador	17 May 2021	25 March 2025	Credentials presented on 23 June 2022
Oleg Petrenko	Ambassador	25 March 2025		
