= List of ambassadors of Russia to Sudan =

Coordinates: 15.584017°N 32.545088°E

Ambassador of the Russian Federation to the Republic of the Sudan
- Emblem of the Russian Foreign Ministry

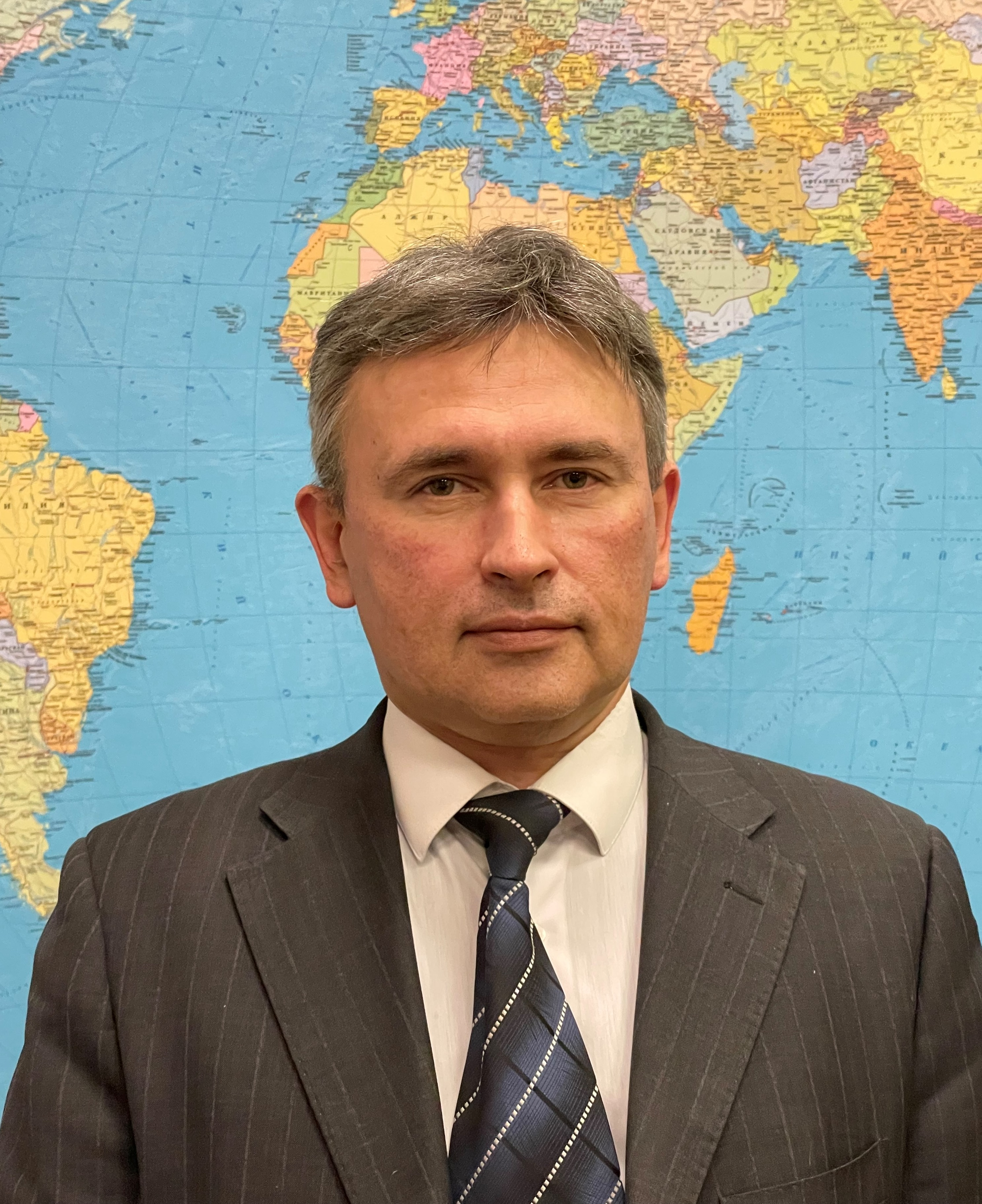
- Incumbent; Andrey Chernovol since 10 March 2023
- Ministry of Foreign Affairs; Embassy of Russia in Khartoum
- Style: His Excellency
- Reports to: Minister of Foreign Affairs
- Seat: Khartoum
- Appointer: President of Russia
- Term length: At the pleasure of the president
- Website: Embassy of Russia in Sudan

The ambassador extraordinary and plenipotentiary of the Russian Federation to the Republic of the Sudan is the official representative of the president and the government of the Russian Federation to the president and the government of Sudan.

The ambassador and his staff work at large in the Embassy of Russia in Khartoum. The post of Russian ambassador to Sudan is currently held by Andrey Chernovol, incumbent since 10 March 2023.

== History of diplomatic relations ==
Diplomatic relations at the mission level between the Soviet Union and Sudan were first established in January 1956. The first ambassador, Leonid Teplov, was appointed on 24 March 1956, and presented his credentials on 30 April 1956. With the dissolution of the Soviet Union in 1991, the Soviet ambassador, Valery Sukhin, continued as representative of the Russian Federation until 1992.

== List of representatives (1956–present) ==
=== Soviet Union to Sudan (1956–1991) ===
Name	Title	Appointment	Termination	Notes
Leonid Teplov	Ambassador	24 March 1956	20 December 1960	Credentials presented 30 April 1956
Mikhail Silin	Ambassador	20 December 1960	29 June 1963	Credentials presented 2 February 1961
Ivan Yakushin	Ambassador	29 June 1963	1 August 1968	Credentials presented 28 September 1963
Anatoly Nikolaev	Ambassador	1 August 1968	11 February 1972	Credentials presented 10 September 1968
Vladimir Polyakov	Ambassador Appointee	11 February 1972	21 July 1972	Did not take up post
Feliks Fedotov	Ambassador	12 December 1972	19 December 1978	Credentials presented 8 January 1973
Vladislav Zhukov	Ambassador	10 January 1979	24 March 1982	Credentials presented 12 February 1979
Boris Vorobyov	Ambassador	24 March 1982	29 June 1983	Credentials presented 10 April 1982
Yevgeny Musiyko	Ambassador	21 October 1983	17 April 1987	Credentials presented 24 December 1983
Valery Sukhin	Ambassador	17 April 1987	25 December 1991	

=== Russian Federation to Sudan (1991–present) ===
Name	Title	Appointment	Termination	Notes
Valery Sukhin	Ambassador	25 December 1991	31 December 1992	
Aleksandr Kuzmin	Ambassador	31 December 1992	7 July 1998	
Valery Kuzmin	Ambassador	7 July 1998	21 January 2003	
Alexey Chistyakov	Ambassador	21 January 2003	12 July 2007	
Envarbik Fazelyanov	Ambassador	12 July 2007	27 December 2013	
Mirgayas Shirinsky	Ambassador	27 December 2013	23 August 2017	
Vladimir Zheltov	Ambassador	12 March 2018	10 March 2023	Credentials presented 25 March 2018
Andrey Chernovol	Ambassador	10 March 2023		

== See also ==
- Foreign relations of Russia
- Ambassadors of Russia
