= List of ambassadors of Russia to Tanzania =

Ambassador of the Russian Federation to the United Republic of Tanzania
- Emblem of the Russian Foreign Ministry

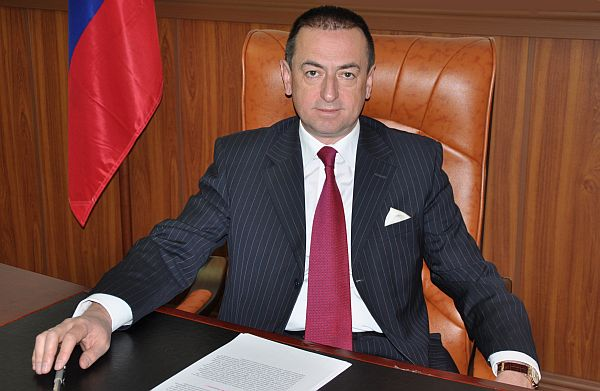
- Incumbent; Andrei Avetisyan since 5 April 2022
- Ministry of Foreign Affairs; Embassy of Russia in Dar es Salaam
- Style: His Excellency; The Honourable
- Reports to: Minister of Foreign Affairs
- Seat: Dar es Salaam
- Appointer: President of Russia
- Term length: At the pleasure of the president
- Website: Embassy of Russia in Dar es Salaam

The ambassador of Russia to Tanzania is the official representative of the president and the government of the Russian Federation to the president and the government of Tanzania.

The ambassador and his staff work at large in the Russian Embassy in Dar es Salaam. The current Russian Ambassador to Tanzania is Andrei Avetisyan, incumbent since 5 April 2022.

== History of diplomatic relations ==
The Soviet Union was one of the first countries to recognize the Republic of Tanganyika following its independence from the United Kingdom, with diplomatic relations established on 11 December 1961. The first ambassador, Andrei Timoshchenko, was appointed on 14 June 1962, and presented his credentials on 28 June 1962. With the creation of the People's Republic of Zanzibar and Pemba following the Zanzibar Revolution in early 1964, the Soviet Union also established diplomatic relations with this new state on 18 January 1964. The Republic of Tanganyika and the People's Republic of Zanzibar and Pemba unified to form the United Republic of Tanzania on 26 April 1964. With the dissolution of the Soviet Union in 1991, the United Republic of Tanzania recognised the Russian Federation as its successor. Representatives have continued to be appointed between the two countries since this time.

== List of representatives (1962–present) ==
=== Soviet Union to the Republic of Tanganyika (1962–1964) ===
Name	Title	Appointment	Termination	Notes
Andrei Timoshchenko	Ambassador	14 June 1962	26 April 1964	Credentials presented on 28 June 1962

=== Soviet Union to the United Republic of Tanzania (1964–1991) ===
Name	Title	Appointment	Termination	Notes
Andrei Timoshchenko	Ambassador	26 April 1964	2 September 1969	
Vyacheslav Ustinov	Ambassador	2 September 1969	26 December 1972	Credentials presented on 15 September 1969
Sergei Slipchenko	Ambassador	26 December 1972	2 April 1980	Credentials presented on 7 February 1973
Yuri Yukalov	Ambassador	2 April 1980	8 July 1985	Credentials presented on 16 April 1980
Sergei Illarionov	Ambassador	8 July 1985	1989	
Andrei Fialkovsky	Ambassador	30 June 1989	16 November 1989	
Vladimir Kuznetsov	Ambassador	16 November 1989	25 December 1991	

=== Russian Federation to the United Republic of Tanzania (1991–present) ===
Name	Title	Appointment	Termination	Notes
Vladimir Kuznetsov	Ambassador	25 December 1991	2 November 1992	
Kenesh Kulmatov	Ambassador	2 November 1992	14 March 1997	
Doku Zavgayev	Ambassador	14 March 1997	17 February 2004	
Leonid Safonov	Ambassador	26 August 2004	27 August 2010	Credentials presented on 13 October 2004
Aleksandr Rannikh	Ambassador	27 August 2010	13 February 2015	
Yuri Popov	Ambassador	13 February 2015	5 April 2022	Credentials presented on 30 April 2015
Andrei Avetisyan	Ambassador	5 April 2022		Credentials presented on 7 June 2022
