= List of ambassadors of Russia to Jamaica =

Ambassador of the Russian Federation to Jamaica
- Emblem of the Russian Foreign Ministry
- Incumbent; Sergey Petrovich since 24 May 2021
- Ministry of Foreign Affairs; Embassy of Russia in Kingston
- Style: His Excellency; The Honourable
- Reports to: Minister of Foreign Affairs
- Seat: Kingston
- Appointer: President of Russia
- Term length: At the pleasure of the president
- Website: Embassy of Russia in Jamaica

The ambassador extraordinary and plenipotentiary of the Russian Federation to Jamaica is the official representative of the president and the government of the Russian Federation to the prime minister and the government of Jamaica.

The Russian ambassador and his staff work at large in the Embassy of Russia in Kingston. The post of Russian ambassador to Jamaica is currently held by Sergey Petrovich, incumbent since 24 May 2021. The ambassador to Jamaica has dual accreditation to Antigua and Barbuda, the Commonwealth of Dominica, Saint Kitts and Nevis, and Saint Lucia. The ambassador is also concurrently accredited as the permanent representative of the Russian Federation to the International Seabed Authority, based in Kingston.

== History of diplomatic relations ==
Diplomatic relations between Jamaica and the Soviet Union were first established on 12 March 1975, during the prime ministership of Michael Manley. Relations were initially handled through the Soviet ambassador to Mexico, Yuri Volsky, who was concurrently accredited to Jamaica on 24 March 1977, and presented his credentials on 29 July 1977. Volsky was succeeded on 23 March 1978 by Dmitry Musin, the first ambassador appointed directly to Jamaica. Following the dissolution of the Soviet Union in 1991, Jamaica recognized Russia as its successor state, with the Soviet ambassador, Vladimir Romanchenko, continuing as Russian ambassador until 1994. Representatives have continued to be exchanged between the two nations.

== List of representatives (1977–present) ==
=== Soviet Union to Jamaica (1977–1991) ===
Name	Title	Appointment	Termination	Notes
Yuri Volsky	Ambassador	24 March 1977	23 March 1978	Credentials presented on 29 July 1977; Concurrently ambassador to Mexico
Dmitry Musin	Ambassador	23 March 1978	25 March 1987	Credentials presented on 1 June 1978
Vladimir Romanchenko	Ambassador	25 March 1987	25 December 1991	

=== Russian Federation to Jamaica (1991–present) ===
Name	Title	Appointment	Termination	Notes
Vladimir Romanchenko	Ambassador	25 December 1991	5 January 1994	
Igor Yakovlev	Ambassador	5 January 1994	8 May 1998	
Nikolai Vladimir	Ambassador	8 May 1998	5 August 2000	
Eduard Malayan	Ambassador	12 August 2000	28 February 2005	
Igor Lebedev	Ambassador	28 February 2005	24 March 2006	
Viktor Zotin	Ambassador	14 December 2006	20 February 2012	
Vladimir Polyenov	Ambassador	20 February 2012	14 March 2016	
Vladimir Vinokurov	Ambassador	14 March 2016	24 May 2021	
Sergei Petrovich	Ambassador	24 May 2021		Credentials presented on 12 August 2021
