= List of ambassadors of Russia to the Democratic Republic of the Congo =

Ambassador of the Russian Federation to the Democratic Republic of the Congo
- Emblem of the Russian Foreign Ministry
- Incumbent; Karl Tikhaze since 10 October 2024
- Ministry of Foreign Affairs; Embassy of Russia in Kinshasa
- Style: His Excellency; The Honourable
- Reports to: Minister of Foreign Affairs
- Seat: Kinshasa
- Appointer: President of Russia
- Term length: At the pleasure of the president
- Website: Embassy of Russia in the Democratic Republic of the Congo

The ambassador of Russia to the Democratic Republic of the Congo is the official representative of the president and the government of the Russian Federation to the president and the government of the Democratic Republic of the Congo.

The ambassador and his staff work at large in the Russian embassy in Kinshasa. The current Russian ambassador to the Democratic Republic of the Congo is Karl Tikhaze, incumbent since 10 October 2024.

== History of diplomatic relations ==
Formal diplomatic relations between the Democratic Republic of the Congo and the Soviet Union were established on 7 July 1960, shortly after the country's independence from Belgium. The first diplomat appointed was Andrey Fomin in July that year, as temporary chargé d'affaires. Mikhail Yakovlev was appointed as the first ambassador on 2 August 1960. The country, at the time known as the Republic of the Congo (Léopoldville), to distinguish it from the neighbouring country of the same name, also termed Republic of the Congo (Brazzaville), quickly became embroiled in conflict as the Congo Crisis began. The embassy was evacuated on 18 September 1960. It resumed operating on 6 July 1961, under a chargé d'affaires, with Sergey Nemchina appointed ambassador on 9 August 1962. The situation remained highly unstable, and with the Soviet-backed Simba rebellion taking place in the country, the Congo government broke off relations on 19 November 1963. They were restored on 30 November 1967, in a period of relative stability following the 1965 coup d'état led by Mobutu Sese Seko. The country's name had by this time been changed to the Democratic Republic of the Congo. A new Soviet ambassador, Igor Usachyov, was appointed on 16 April 1968. Exchange of ambassadors continued throughout the following years, during which time the name of the country was again changed, this time to the Republic of Zaire, in 1971. With the dissolution of the Soviet Union in 1991, the incumbent Soviet ambassador, Vladislovas Ionaytis, continued in post as the Russian ambassador until 1993.

== List of representatives of Russia to the Democratic Republic of the Congo (1960–present) ==
=== Soviet Union to the Democratic Republic of the Congo (Note: The Republic of the Congo (Léopoldville) between 1960 and 1964, the Democratic Republic of the Congo between 1964 and 1971, and the Republic of Zaire between 1971 and 1997.) (1960–1991) ===
Name	Title	Appointment	Termination	Notes
Andrey Fomin	Chargé d'affaires	July 1960		
Mikhail Yakovlev	Ambassador	2 August 1960	18 September 1960	Credentials presented on 17 August 1960
Congo Crisis - Diplomatic relations interrupted (1960-1961)
Leonid Podgorny	Chargé d'affaires	1961	1962	
Sergey Nemchina	Ambassador	9 August 1962	19 November 1963	Credentials presented on 20 September 1962
Congo Crisis - Diplomatic relations interrupted (1963-1968)
Igor Usachyov	Ambassador	16 April 1968	29 December 1970	Credentials presented on 21 June 1968
Ivan Lavrov	Ambassador	29 December 1970	24 September 1979	Credentials presented on 15 March 1971
Ivan Marchuk	Ambassador	24 September 1979	27 May 1984	Credentials presented on 30 October 1979
Vladimir Filatov	Ambassador	27 May 1984	13 January 1986	Credentials presented on 18 September 1984
Valentin Soldatov	Ambassador	13 January 1986	1 February 1988	
Vladislovas Ionaytis	Ambassador	1 February 1988	25 December 1991	

=== Russian Federation to the Democratic Republic of the Congo (Note: The Republic of Zaire prior to 1997.) (1991–present) ===
Name	Title	Appointment	Termination	Notes
Vladislovas Ionaytis	Ambassador	25 December 1991	16 March 1993	
Yury Spirin	Ambassador	16 March 1993	16 October 1998	
Valery Gamayun	Ambassador	16 October 1998	30 September 2003	
Oleg Vasnetsov	Ambassador	30 September 2003	27 August 2008	
Anatoly Klimenko	Ambassador	27 August 2008	11 June 2013	
Igor Yevdokimov	Ambassador	11 June 2013	7 August 2017	
Aleksey Sentebov	Ambassador	7 August 2017	10 October 2024	Credentials presented on 16 November 2017
Karl Tikhaze	Ambassador	10 October 2024		Credentials presented on 15 January 2025
