= List of ambassadors of Russia to Mexico =

Ambassador of the Russian Federation to the United Mexican States
- Embajada de la Federación de Rusia en los Estados Unidos Mexicanos
- Emblem of the Russian Foreign Ministry
- Incumbent; Nikolai Sofinsky since 10 February 2023
- Ministry of Foreign Affairs; Embassy of Russia in Mexico City
- Style: His Excellency; The Honourable
- Reports to: Minister of Foreign Affairs
- Seat: Mexico City
- Appointer: President of Russia
- Term length: At the pleasure of the president
- Website: Embassy of Russia in Mexico

The ambassador extraordinary and plenipotentiary of the Russian Federation to Mexico is the official representative of the president and the government of the Russian Federation to the president and the government of Mexico.

The Russian ambassador and his staff work at large in the Embassy of Russia in Mexico City. The post of Russian ambassador to Mexico is currently held by Nikolai Sofinsky, incumbent since 10 February 2023. Since 1995, the ambassador to Mexico has dual accreditation to Belize.

== History of diplomatic relations ==
Relations between the Russian Empire and Mexico date back to the early nineteenth century, with visits from traders from Pacific Russia to settlements on the west coast of North America. Mexico was initially part of the Spanish Empire, when the province of Alta California, part of New Spain, was visited by Nikolai Rezanov aboard the Russian ship Juno in March 1806. Russian trade and settlement began in the area, with the Russian-American Company establishing and operating Fort Ross, in what is now the state of California, in 1812. Following the Mexican War of Independence, negotiations on relations took place in London in the 1820s, and in Brussels in the mid-1880s. The first Russian ambassador to Mexico, Roman Rosen, was appointed on 11 December 1890. A bilateral agreement on trade and navigation was signed in 1909, but the upheaval of the Mexican Revolution, beginning in 1910, the First World War from 1914, and the October Revolution of 1917 in Russia, disrupted relations. Representation from Russia had been by chargé d'affaires from October 1914, with the exchange of ambassadors ending in 1917. Consular affairs remained active however, with Mexico operating consulates in Saint Petersburg, Moscow, Helsinki and Riga, and Russia having consulates in Mexico City, Veracruz, Monterrey and Guadalajara.

Following the establishment of a left wing government after the end of the Mexican Revolution in 1920, and the formation of the Soviet Union in 1922, Mexico became the first country in the Americas to establish diplomatic relations with the Soviet government, in 1924. Bolshevik revolutionary and party leader Stanisław Pestkowski was appointed as the first ambassador in 1924. He was succeeded by Alexandra Kollontai in 1926. Mexican socialist thought began to substantially diverge from the ideology of the Soviet Union, and in 1930, diplomatic relations were broken off. In 1942, Mexico joined the Second World War on the side of the Allies, thus becoming an ally of the Soviet Union. The embassy was reopened that year, and a new ambassador was appointed. Ambassadors were thereafter exchanged between the two countries up until the dissolution of the Soviet Union in 1991. Mexico recognised the Russian Federation as the successor to the Soviet Union, with Soviet ambassador Oleg Darusenkov continuing in post until 1994. Ambassadors have since then continued to be exchanged.

== List of representatives (1890–present) ==
=== Russian Empire to Mexico (1890–1917) ===
| Name | Title | Appointment | Termination | Notes |
|---|---|---|---|---|
| Roman Rosen | Envoy | 11 December 1890 | 25 April 1895 | Credentials presented on 10 June 1891 |
| Karl Weber | Envoy | 18 July 1895 | 15 December 1900 | |
| Fyodor Ganzen | Chargé d'affaires | 15 December 1900 | 14 January 1902 | |
| Grigory de Vollan | Chargé d'affaires until 1906; Envoy after 1906 | 14 January 1902 | 1910 | |
| Aleksandr Stalevsky | Envoy | 1910 | 1917 | Left Mexico in October 1914 |
| Vladimir Vendgauzen von Rosenberg | Chargé d'affaires | October 1914 | 1917 | |

=== Soviet Union to Mexico (1924–1991) ===
| Name | Title | Appointment | Termination | Notes |
|---|---|---|---|---|
| Stanisław Pestkowski | Diplomatic representative | 29 August 1924 | 17 September 1926 | Credentials presented on 7 November 1924 |
| Alexandra Kollontai | Diplomatic representative | 17 September 1926 | 25 October 1927 | Credentials presented on 24 December 1926 |
| Leon Gaikis | Chargé d'affaires | 1927 | 1928 | |
| Aleksandr Makar | Diplomatic representative | 25 October 1927 | 26 January 1930 | Credentials presented on 6 April 1928 |
Diplomatic relations interrupted (1930 - 1942)
| Viktor Fedyushin | Envoy | 12 November 1942 | 2 June 1943 | |
| Konstantin Umansky | Envoy until 17 June 1943; Ambassador after 17 June 1943 | 2 June 1943 | 25 January 1945 | Credentials presented on 22 June 1943 |
| Aleksandr Kapustin | Ambassador | 10 October 1945 | 19 July 1953 | Credentials presented on 16 November 1945 |
| Antaloy Kulazhenkov | Ambassador | 19 July 1953 | 28 February 1957 | Credentials presented on 5 November 1953 |
| Vladimir Bazykin | Ambassador | 28 February 1957 | 4 June 1962 | Credentials presented on 16 May 1957 |
| Semyon Bazarov | Ambassador | 4 June 1962 | 21 February 1968 | Credentials presented on 20 June 1962 |
| Igor Kolosovsky | Ambassador | 21 February 1968 | 27 January 1970 | Credentials presented on 29 March 1968 |
| Gennady Fomin | Ambassador | 27 January 1970 | 11 August 1972 | Credentials presented on 13 March 1970 |
| Nikolai Tarasov | Ambassador | 11 August 1972 | 24 March 1976 | Credentials presented on 10 October 1972 |
| Yuri Volsky | Ambassador | 24 March 1976 | 21 May 1980 | Credentials presented on 28 June 1976 |
| Rostislav Sergeyev | Ambassador | 21 May 1980 | 7 March 1990 | Credentials presented on 26 June 1980 |
| Oleg Darusenkov | Ambassador | 7 March 1990 | 25 December 1991 | |

=== Russian Federation to Mexico (1991–present) ===
| Name | Title | Appointment | Termination | Notes |
|---|---|---|---|---|
| Oleg Darusenkov | Ambassador | 25 December 1991 | 24 May 1994 | |
| Yevgeny Ambartsumov | Ambassador | 24 May 1994 | 27 August 1999 | |
| Konstantin Mozel | Ambassador | 27 August 1999 | 31 March 2005 | |
| Valery Morozov | Ambassador | 10 October 2005 | 29 October 2012 | |
| Eduard Malayan | Ambassador | 29 October 2012 | 20 June 2018 | Credentials presented on 14 February 2013 |
| Viktor Koronelli | Ambassador | 22 June 2018 | 10 February 2023 | Credentials presented on 30 October 2018 |
| Nikolai Sofinsky | Ambassador | 10 February 2023 | | Credentials presented on 25 May 2023 |
