= Leonid Moiseyev =

Russian diplomat (born 1948)

- Леонид Моисеев

Ambassador of Russia to Singapore
- In office 31 October 2011 – 20 February 2015
- Preceded by: Andrey Rozhkov
- Succeeded by: Andrey Tatarinov

Ambassador of Russia to Australia
- In office 20 July 2001 – 10 November 2005
- Preceded by: Rashit Khamidulin
- Succeeded by: Alexander Viktorovich Blokhin

Personal details
- Born: January 16, 1948 (age 78)
- Education: Moscow Institute of International Relations
- Occupation: diplomat

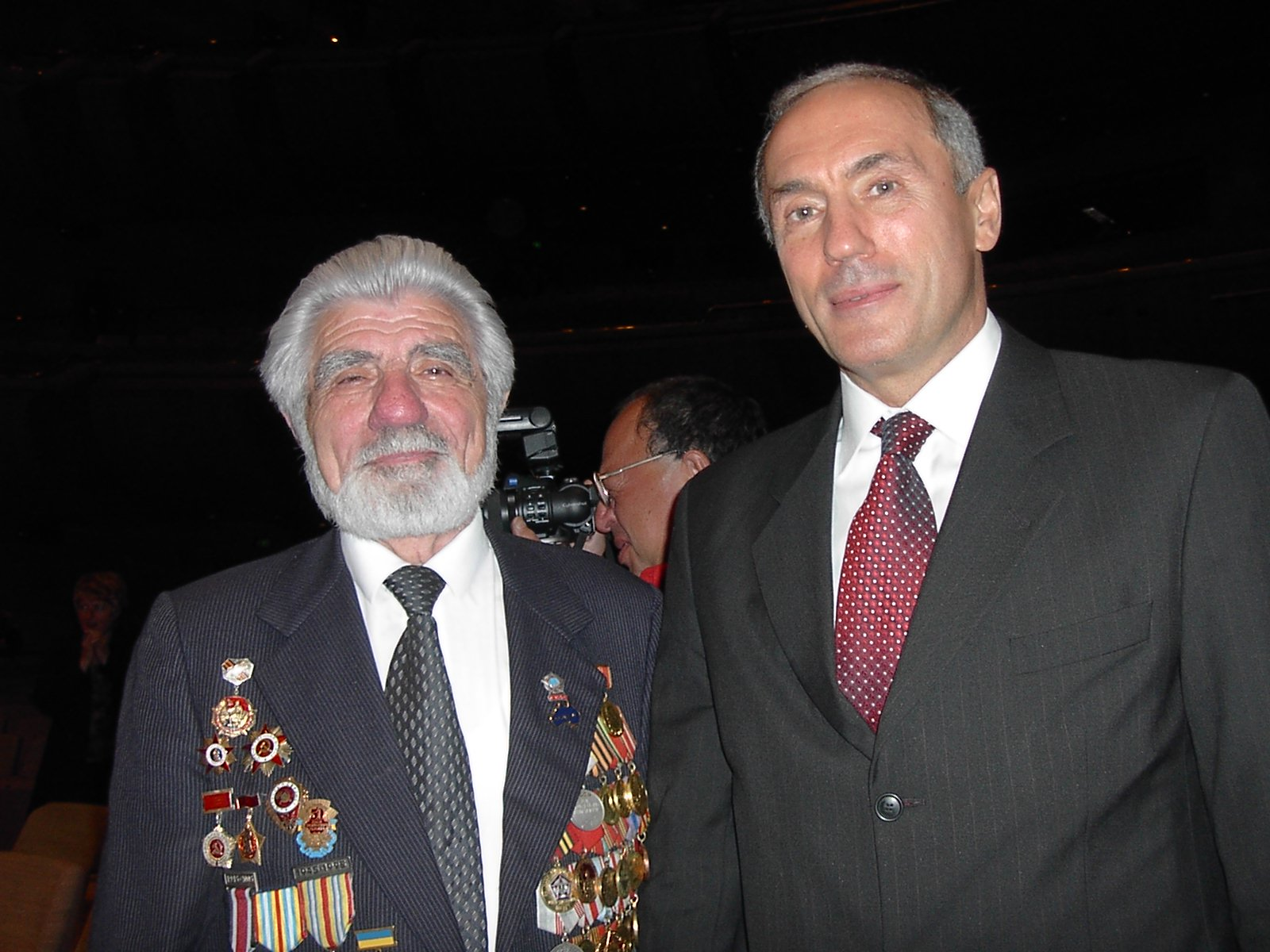
Ambassador Leonid Moiseev with a veteran from the former Soviet Union, Melbourne, 1 May 2005

Leonid Petrovich Moiseyev (Russian: Леонид Петрович Моисеев; born 16 January 1948) is a Russian diplomat.

Educated at the Moscow Institute of International Relations, Moiseyev has been a member of first the Soviet and then the Russian diplomatic service since 1973. He has served mainly in the People's Republic of China (he is fluent in Chinese) and Japan.

From 1994 to 2001 Moiseev was first Deputy Director and then Director of the First Asian Directorate of the Ministry of Foreign Affairs of the Russian Federation, dealing with issues relating to China, Taiwan, North Korea, South Korea and Mongolia, and was also a Member of the Collegium of the Ministry of Foreign Affairs of the Russian Federation.

Moiseyev was the Ambassador of Russia to Australia from 20 July 2001 to 10 November 2005, and the ambassador to Singapore between 2011 and 2015.

== Awards ==
- Medal of the Order "For Merit to the Fatherland" 2 class (March 4, 1998)
- Medal of the Order "For Merit to the Fatherland" 1 class (January 15, 2004)
- Decoration For Impeccable Service for 30 years (April 10, 2008)
