= Russia–South Sudan relations =

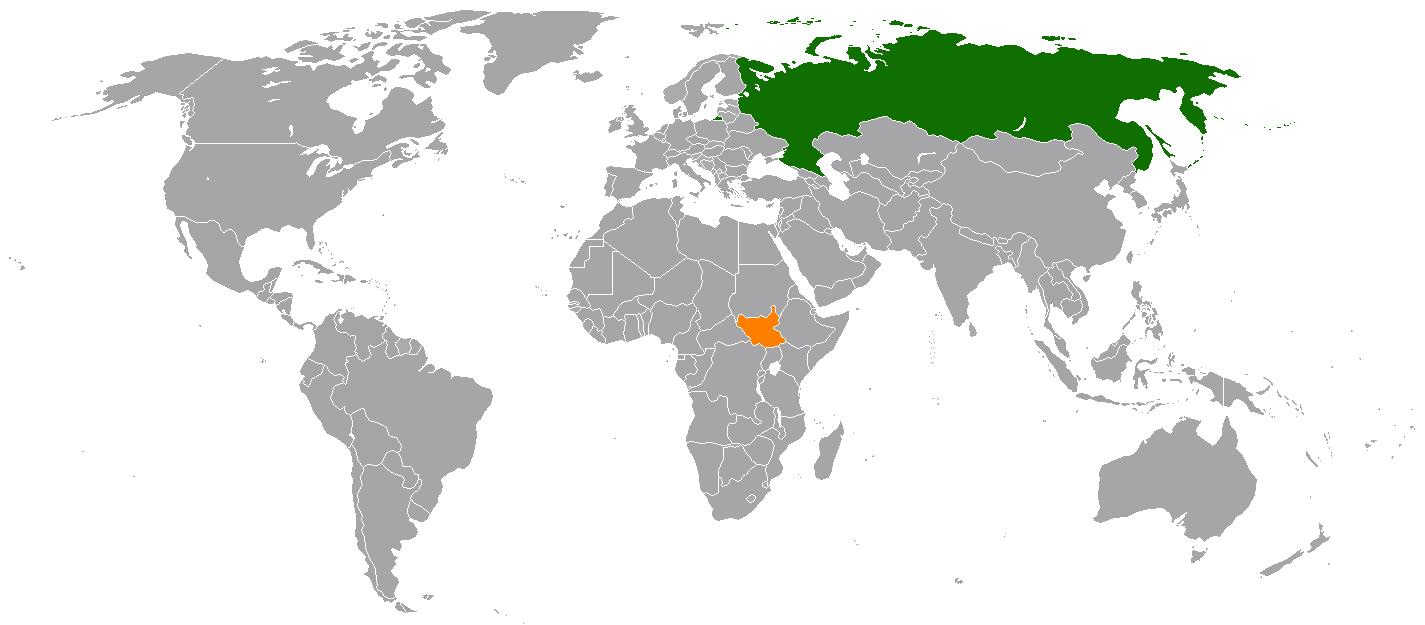

- Russia: South Sudan

Russia–South Sudan relations (Russian: Российско-южносуданские отношения) are the bilateral relations between Russia and South Sudan.

== Diplomatic relations ==
On 9 July 2011, Mikhail Margelov, Russia's representative at independence ceremonies in Juba, delivered to President of South Sudan Salva Kiir a message from Russian president Dmitry Medvedev, which saw Medvedev congratulating his South Sudanese counterpart on the independence of the new nation. On 11 July 2011, Dmitry Medvedev issued an ukaz formally recognising the independence of South Sudan and instructing the Russian Ministry of Foreign Affairs to begin negotiations with South Sudan on the establishment of diplomatic relations.

In introducing Sergey Shishkin, the Russian Ambassador to Uganda, to Deng Alor, the South Sudanese Foreign Minister, Margelov also announced the intention of Russia to establish an embassy in Juba, and that Shishkin would concurrently be accredited to South Sudan in the meantime.

== Economic relations ==
In Juba for the independence ceremonies, Margelov stated that Russia intended to pursue economic ties with South Sudan, noting that the newly independent nation had many challenges ahead of it, and Russia would have to seize the opportunity and establish itself as part of the nation's economy.

== See also ==
- List of ambassadors of Russia to South Sudan
