= List of ambassadors of Russia to New Zealand =

Coordinates: 41.28715°S 174.75094°E

Ambassador of the Russian Federation to New Zealand
- Emblem of the Russian Foreign Ministry
- Incumbent; Stanislav Krans since 14 April 2026
- Ministry of Foreign Affairs; Embassy of Russia in Wellington
- Style: His Excellency
- Reports to: Minister of Foreign Affairs
- Seat: Wellington
- Appointer: President of Russia
- Term length: At the pleasure of the president
- Website: Embassy of Russia in New Zealand

The ambassador extraordinary and plenipotentiary of the Russian Federation to New Zealand is the official representative of the president and the government of the Russian Federation to the prime minister and the government of New Zealand.

The ambassador and his staff work at large in the Embassy of Russia in Wellington. The post of Russian ambassador to New Zealand is currently held by Stanislav Krans, incumbent since 14 April 2026. The ambassador of Russia to New Zealand is concurrently accredited to Samoa and Tonga.

== History of diplomatic relations ==
Diplomatic relations between the Soviet Union and New Zealand were established at the mission level on 13 April 1944. The first envoy, Ivan Zyabkin, was appointed on 22 June 1945 and presented his credentials on 26 June that year. The mission was upgraded to an embassy 19 April 1973. With the dissolution of the Soviet Union in 1991, the Soviet ambassador, Yuri Sokolov, continued as representative of the Russian Federation until 1992.

== List of representatives (1945–present) ==
=== Soviet Union to New Zealand (1945–1991) ===
Name	Title	Appointment	Termination	Notes
Ivan Zyabkin	Envoy	22 June 1945	19 April 1948	Credentials presented 26 June 1945
Aleksandr Aleksandrov	Envoy	4 March 1949	10 September 1953	Credentials presented 5 July 1949
Nikolai Generalov	Envoy	10 September 1953	15 December 1955	Credentials presented 27 November 1953; Non-resident ambassador, concurrently accredited to Australia
Georgy Rodionov	Chargé d'affaires	1956	1960	
Nikolai Ivanov	Chargé d'affaires	1960	1965	
Boris Dorofeyev	Envoy	5 March 1965	21 August 1969	Credentials presented 14 March 1965
Anatoly Ivantsov	Envoy (before 12 June 1973); Ambassador (after 12 June 1973)	21 August 1969	31 August 1974	Credentials presented 17 October 1969
Oleg Selyaninov	Ambassador	31 August 1974	21 January 1979	Credentials presented 25 October 1974
Vsevolod Sofinsky	Ambassador	27 January 1979	28 March 1984	
Vladimir Bykov	Ambassador	23 May 1984	22 June 1987	
Yuri Sokolov	Ambassador	22 June 1987	25 December 1991	

=== Russian Federation to New Zealand (1991–present) ===
Name	Title	Appointment	Termination	Notes
Yuri Sokolov	Ambassador	25 December 1991	18 March 1992	
Alexander Losyukov	Ambassador	18 March 1992	11 November 1993	
Sergey Belyaev	Ambassador	22 May 1995	15 December 1999	
Gennady Shabannikov	Ambassador	15 December 1999	28 July 2004	
Mikhail Lysenko	Ambassador	28 July 2004	11 September 2008	
Andrey Tatarinov	Ambassador	11 September 2008	4 October 2012	
Valery Tereshchenko	Ambassador	4 October 2012	4 June 2018	
Georgy Zuev	Ambassador	4 June 2018	14 April 2026	
Stanislav Krans	Ambassador	14 April 2026		
