= Valery Tereshchenko =

Valery Tereshchenko may refer to:

- Valery Tereshchenko (diplomat)
- Valery Tereshchenko (academic)
