= Mikhail Nikolaevich Lysenko =

Mikhail Lysenko
- Михаил Лысенко

Ambassador of Russia to New Zealand
- In office July 28, 2004 – September 11, 2008
- Preceded by: Gennady Ivanovich Shabannikov
- Succeeded by: Andrey Tatarinov

Personal details
- Born: 1955 (age 70–71)
- Education: Moscow State Institute of International Relations

Mikhail Nikolaevich Lysenko (Russian: Михаил Николаевич Лысенко; born 12 May 1955) is a retired Russian diplomat.

== Career ==
In 1977, he entered the foreign service where for three years he was an Officer in the Department United States of the Ministry of Foreign Affairs. From 1980 to 1985 he was employed in the Embassy in Washington, D.C. United States. From 1986 to 1988 he was Member of the Secretariat of Deputy Minister of Foreign Affairs. From 1990 to 1991 he was employed in the department North America. From 1992 to 1996 he was head of department, deputy director of the North American Department of the Ministry of Foreign Affairs.

From 1996 to 2000, he was Minister-Counsellor of the Russian Embassy in Ottawa, Canada. From 2000 to 2001 he was Deputy Director, Department for Security Affairs and Disarmament Ministry of Foreign Affairs.

From 2001 to 2004, he was Director of the Department for Security and Disarmament at the Ministry of Foreign Affairs. From July 28, 2004 to September 11, 2008 he was ambassador to New Zealand and concurrently accredited as ambassador to Tonga and Samoa.

From 2008 to December 31 to 2014, he was Director of the International Cooperation Department, of Rosatom. In 2004 he became Member of the Advisory Board of the de:PIR-Center.

== Education ==
Lysenko has a degree from the Moscow State Institute of International Relations (MGIMO).
