= Embassy of Russia, Tbilisi =

Embassy of the Russian Federation in Tbilisi
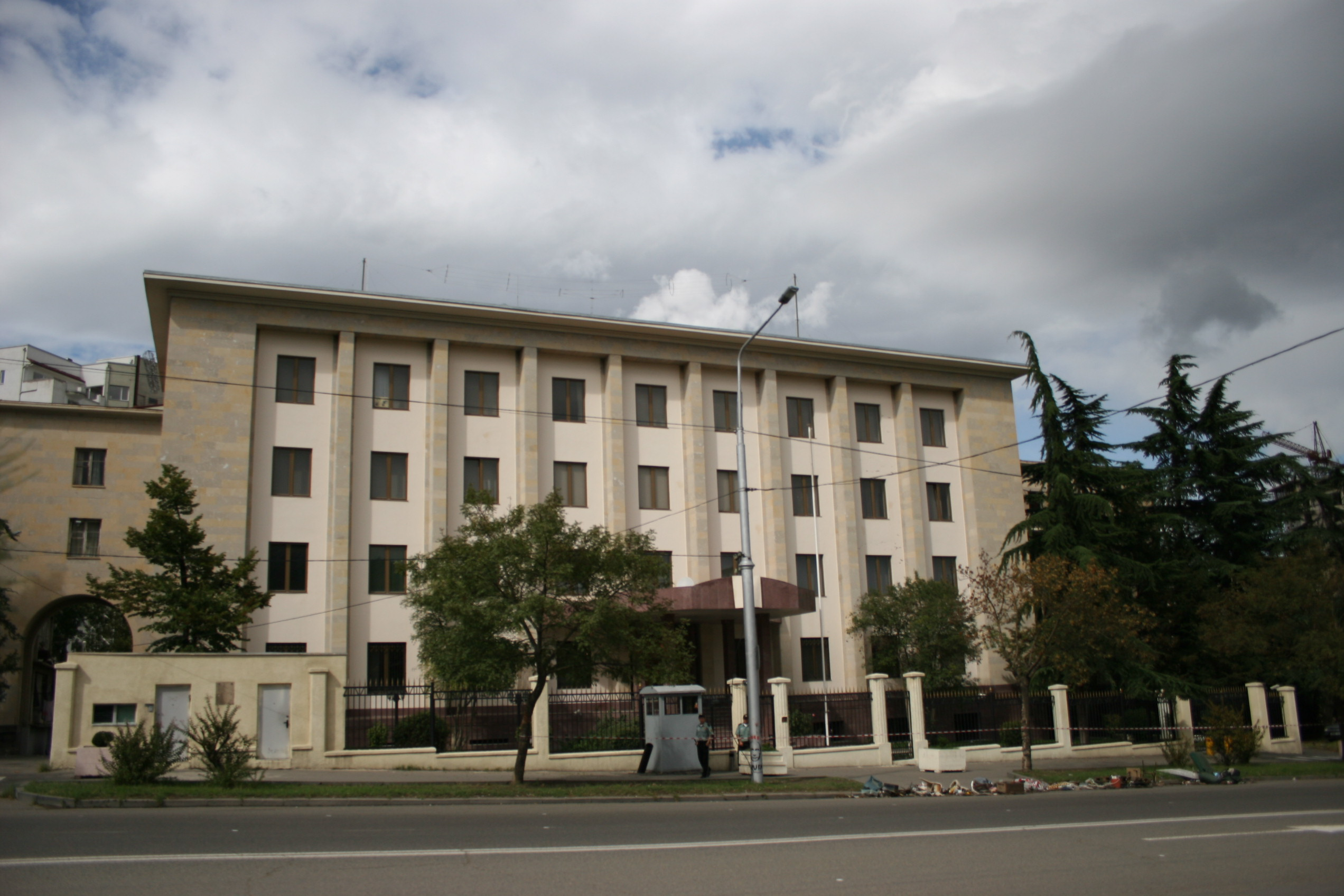
- Location: Tbilisi
- Address: 51 Chavchavadze Avenue, Vake
- Coordinates: 41°42′39″N 44°44′34″E

The Embassy of Russia in Tbilisi was the diplomatic mission of Russia to the Republic of Georgia. The chancery was located at 51 Chavchavadze Avenue in Tbilisi. On August 29, 2008, Georgia ordered the Russian ambassador Vyacheslav Kovalenko and all other Russian diplomats to leave the country and close the embassy and severed diplomatic relations with Russia. Russia and Georgia had previously fought a five-day war over two Georgian breakaway regions (Abkhazia and South Ossetia) declaring independence. The Russian Federation is represented through the Russian Federation Interests Section of the Embassy of Switzerland in Georgia.

== See also ==
- List of ambassadors of Russia to Georgia
- Diplomatic missions in Georgia (country)
- Diplomatic missions of Russia
- Georgia–Russia relations
