= Cambodia–Russia relations =

- Cambodia: Russia

Diplomatic mission
- Cambodian embassy, Moscow: Russian embassy, Phnom Pen

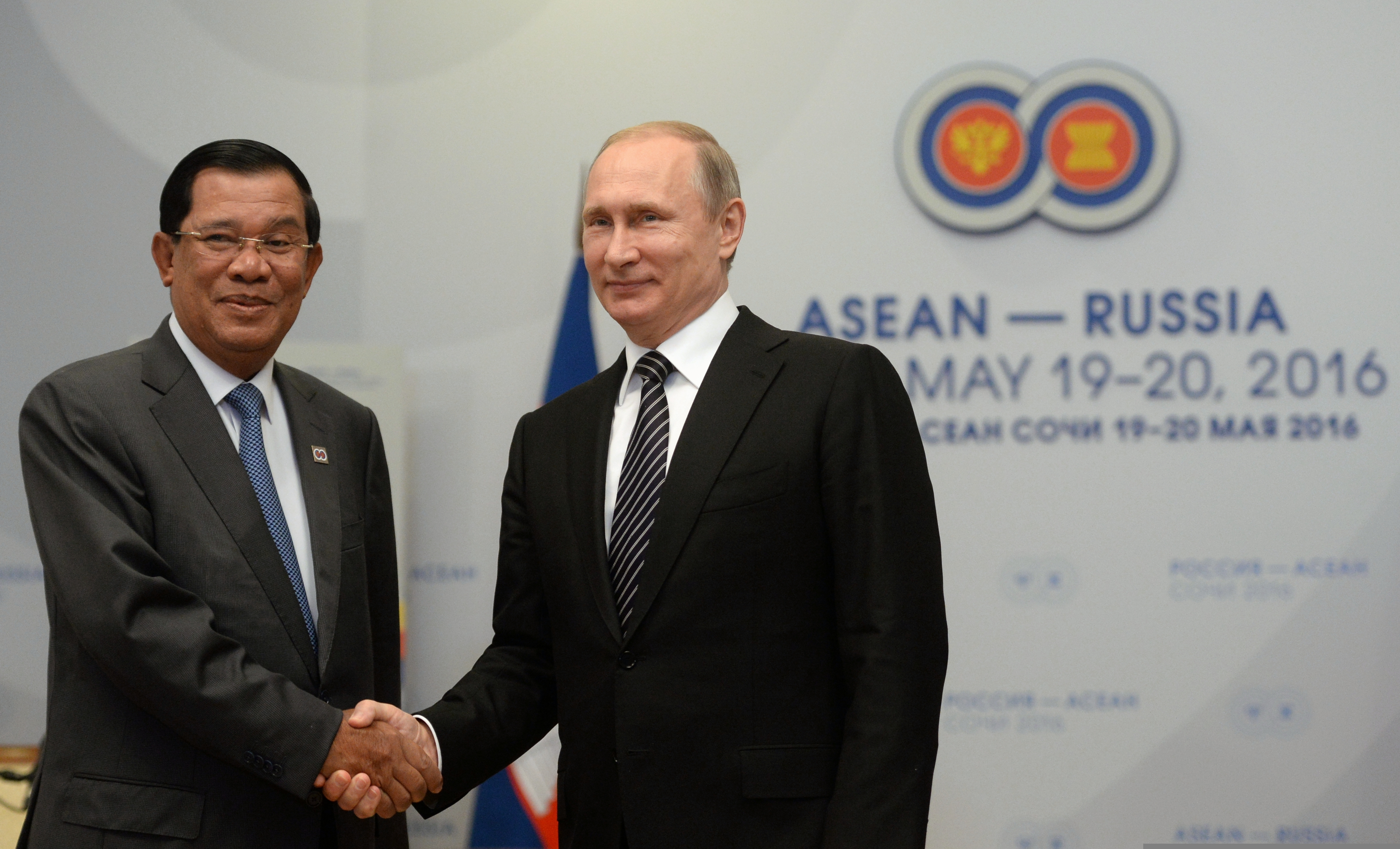
Prime Minister of Cambodia Hun Sen with the President of Russia Vladimir Putin on May 19, 2016.

Cambodia–Russia relations (Russian: Российско-камбоджийские отношения) (Khmer: ទំនាក់ទំនងកម្ពុជា-រុស្ស៊ី) are the bilateral relations between the Kingdom of Cambodia and the Russian Federation. The relations between both countries were strong since the Soviet era. Russia has an embassy in Phnom Penh. Cambodia has an embassy in Moscow. Both countries are full members of the East Asia Summit.

== History ==
Diplomatic relations were established on 13 May 1956, one year after Cambodia became a member of the UN. In 1962, the USSR built and funded the Institute of Technology of Cambodia. On 3 May 1965, Sihanouk turned to the Soviet Union for economic and military assistance during the Cambodian Civil War. The Soviet Union then backed the initiatives of Norodom Sihanouk who was one of the founding figures of the Non-Aligned Movement. In 1957, Cambodia and the Soviet Union signed the trade agreements and cultural and scientific cooperation. The Soviet Union condemned Lon Nol’s 1970 Cambodian coup d'état.

== Relations with the Khmer Rouge ==
The Khmer Rouge classified the USSR as an unfriendly country and in November 1973, the Soviet Ministry of Foreign Affairs withdrew all diplomatic personnel from Democratic Kampuchea. By April 1975, only a few technicians remained in Phnom Penh, who monitored the state of the building and the property of the embassy.

Immediately after the Fall of Phnom Penh, Moscow turned to the new leadership of Democratic Kampuchea with a proposal to restore full-fledged diplomatic relations between the countries. However, the Khmer Rouge refused and placed the Headquarters of the Angkar in the building of the former Soviet embassy.

At the same time, until the end of 1975, Cambodian diplomats from the GRUNK remained in the Cambodian embassy in Moscow. Diplomats of the Khmer Rouge led a secluded life and were mainly engaged in the distribution of propaganda literature. In September 1977, the diplomats of Democratic Kampuchea left Moscow without explanation, leaving the building of the Cambodian embassy unattended.

== Relations with the PRK ==
In early 1979, the diplomatic relations between the countries were re-established. From 1980 through 1990, the Soviet Union provided substantial economic and military aid as well as technical assistance to Cambodia.

== Post-1991 and present day relations ==
After the collapse of the Soviet Union, the relationships between the two countries were completely strained under Boris Yeltsin. However, as Vladimir Putin rose to power, they were improved as the two countries became members of the East Asia Summit, which helped the two countries improve their trade.

== Relations since the Russian invasion of Ukraine ==
Relations between the two began to strain once again in March 2022 after Hun Sen used strong language and condemned Russia for invading its neighbor, Ukraine and the country co-sponsored and voted in favor of an UN resolution. Cambodia had similarly been invaded and occupied by Vietnam, an ally of the Soviet Union, from 1979 to 1989.

It has been rumored that Cambodia's foreign ministry wanted to remain strictly neutral and abstain at UN votes, similar to Vietnam and Laos, in the days after Russia invaded Ukraine on February 24, 2022, but Hun Sen intervened and ordered his diplomat at the UN to vote in favor of a resolution condemning Moscow.

== High level visits ==
Russia to Cambodia

- Prime Minister Dmitry Medvedev (November 2015)

Cambodia to Russia

- King Norodom Sihanouk (March 1970)
- President Heng Samrin (February 1980)
- Prime Minister Hun Sen (May 2016)
- Prime Minister Hun Manet (June 2026)

== See also ==
- Foreign relations of Cambodia
- Foreign relations of Russia
- List of ambassadors of Russia to Cambodia
- People's Republic of Kampuchea
