= Vadim Serafimov =

Russian diplomat

Vadim Viktorovich Serafimov (Russian: Вадим Викторович Серафимов; born 29 August 1949) is a career diplomat and the former Ambassador Extraordinary and Plenipotentiary of the Russian Federation to the Socialist Republic of Vietnam.

Serafimov graduated from the Moscow State Institute of International Relations in 1971, and went on to work in various diplomatic posts in the central offices of the Ministry of Foreign Affairs and abroad.

From 1994 to 1999 Serafimov was the Ambassador of Russia to Cambodia, and was appointed by Vladimir Putin on 9 December 2004 to the post of Ambassador of Russia to Vietnam.

Serafimov speaks Russian, English, French and Vietnamese.
