= List of ambassadors of Russia to Georgia =

Ambassador of the Russian Federation to Georgia
- Emblem of the Russian Foreign Ministry
- Incumbent; Vacant
- Ministry of Foreign Affairs; Embassy of Russia, Tbilisi
- Style: His Excellency; The Honourable
- Reports to: Minister of Foreign Affairs
- Seat: Tbilisi
- Appointer: President of Russia
- Term length: At the pleasure of the president

The ambassador of Russia to Georgia was the official representative of the president and the government of the Russian Federation to the president and the government of Georgia.

The ambassador and his staff worked at large in the Russian embassy in Tbilisi. Diplomatic relations were broken off following the Russo-Georgian War in August 2008, and there are currently no official diplomatic relations between the two countries.

== History of diplomatic relations ==
With the process of the disintegration of the Russian Empire following the October Revolution and the outbreak of the Russian Civil War, the Russian Soviet Federative Socialist Republic established relations with the independent Democratic Republic of Georgia in 1920. Georgia's independence was short-lived, it was invaded by Red Army forces in 1921, who established the Georgian Soviet Socialist Republic, which with the Russian Soviet Federative Socialist Republic, and other republics, formed the Soviet Union on its formation in 1922. Envoys in this period were Sergei Kirov, Aron Sheinman, and Boris Legran.

With the process of the dissolution of the Soviet Union, the Georgian Soviet Socialist Republic held an independence referendum on 31 March 1991, subsequently declaring independence four days later. Georgian indepencence was recognized, and following the dissolution of the Soviet Union and the RSFSR becoming the Russian Federation, diplomatic relations were formally established on 1 July 1992. Vladimir Zemsky was appointed the first ambassador on 24 October 1992. The last Russian ambassador to Georgia was Vyacheslav Kovalenko, who was appointed on 7 July 2006. In August 2008, the Russo-Georgian War broke out. On 29 August 2008, Georgia ordered Kovalenko and all other Russian diplomats to leave the country, closed the embassy and severed diplomatic relations with Russia. The Russian Federation has since been represented through the Russian Federation Interests Section of the Embassy of Switzerland in Georgia.

== Representatives of Russia to Georgia (1920–2008) ==
=== Russian Soviet Federative Socialist Republic to Georgia (1920–1922) ===
Name	Title	Appointment	Termination	Notes
Sergei Kirov	Diplomatic representative	29 May 1920	September 1920	
Aron Sheinman	Diplomatic representative	September 1920	25 February 1921	
Boris Legran	Diplomatic representative	March 1921	1922	

=== Russian Federation to Georgia (1992–2008) ===
Name	Title	Appointment	Termination	Notes
Vladimir Zemsky	Ambassador	24 October 1992	21 September 1996	
Feliks Stanevsky	Ambassador	21 September 1996	24 August 2000	
Vladimir Gudev	Ambassador	24 August 2000	31 October 2002	Credentials presented on 21 October 2000
Vladimir Chkhikvishvili	Ambassador	31 October 2002	7 July 2006	Credentials presented on 27 February 2003
Vyacheslav Kovalenko	Ambassador	7 July 2006	8 July 2009	Credentials presented on 31 January 2007
Russo-Georgian War - Diplomatic relations interrupted (2008-present)

=== Heads of the Russian Interests Section (2008–present) ===
Name	Appointment	Termination	Notes
Andrey Smaga	5 March 2009	2015	
Vadim Gorelov	2015	2016	
Yevgeny Koneshev	25 May 2017	December 2020	
Dmitry Trofimov	10 January 2021	April 2025	
Dmitry Olisov	2 June 2025		

== See also ==
- List of ambassadors of Georgia to Russia
