= List of ambassadors of Russia to Singapore =

Ambassador of the Russian Federation to Singapore
- Emblem of the Russian Foreign Ministry
- Incumbent; Sergey Ganzha since 15 July 2025
- Ministry of Foreign Affairs; Embassy of Russia in Singapore
- Style: His Excellency; The Honourable
- Reports to: Minister of Foreign Affairs
- Seat: Singapore
- Appointer: President of Russia
- Term length: At the pleasure of the president
- Formation: 1968
- First holder: Ilya Safonov
- Website: Embassy of Russia in Singapore

The ambassador extraordinary and plenipotentiary of the Russian Federation to Singapore is the official representative of the president and the government of the Russian Federation to the president and the government of Singapore.

The ambassador and his staff work at large in the Embassy of Russia in Singapore. The post of Russian ambassador to Singapore is currently held by Sergey Ganzha, incumbent since 15 July 2025.

== History of diplomatic relations ==
Diplomatic relations at the mission level between the Soviet Union and Singapore were first established on 1 June 1968. The first ambassador, Ilya Safonov, was appointed on 18 December 1968, and presented his credentials on 23 January 1969. With the dissolution of the Soviet Union in 1991, the Soviet ambassador, Nikolai Loginov, continued as representative of the Russian Federation until 1994.

== List of representatives (1968–present) ==
=== Soviet Union to Singapore (1968–1991) ===
Name	Title	Appointment	Termination	Notes
Ilya Safonov	Ambassador	18 December 1968	4 March 1971	
Boris Bezrukavnikov	Ambassador	4 March 1971	20 May 1975	
Yury Razdukhov	Ambassador	20 May 1975	24 April 1980	
Fyodor Potapenko	Ambassador	24 April 1980	10 August 1984	
Vladimir Semyonov	Ambassador	10 August 1984	15 July 1987	
Anatoly Dryukov	Ambassador	15 July 1987	24 August 1990	
Nikolai Loginov	Ambassador	24 August 1990	25 December 1991	

=== Russian Federation to Singapore (1991–present) ===
Name	Title	Appointment	Termination	Notes
Nikolai Loginov	Ambassador	25 December 1991	5 October 1994	
Mikhail Beliy	Ambassador	5 October 1994	4 June 1999	
Sergey Kiselyov	Ambassador	4 June 1999	12 June 2005	
Andrey Rozhkov	Ambassador	12 June 2005	31 October 2011	
Leonid Moiseyev	Ambassador	31 October 2011	20 February 2015	
Andrey Tatarinov	Ambassador	20 February 2015	29 April 2021	
Nikolay Kudashev	Ambassador	12 January 2022	15 July 2025	
Sergey Ganzha	Ambassador	15 July 2025		
