= Ivan Kurdyukov =

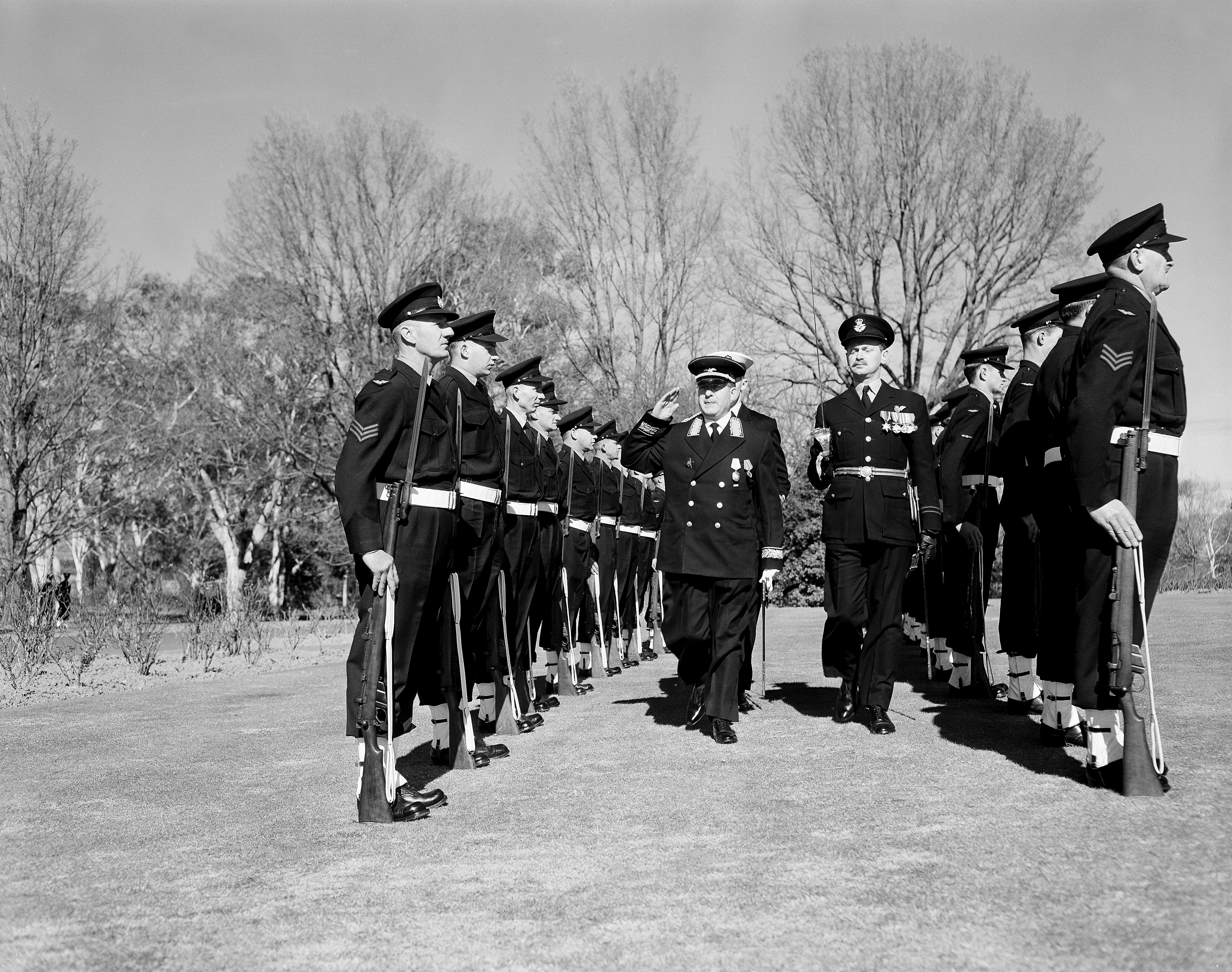
(6) 1959 Kurdyukov, Ambassador for Russia, credentials - kopie

Ivan Fyodorovich Kurdyukov (Russian: Иван Фёдорович Курдюков; 1911 – 3 October, 1977) was a Soviet diplomat.

A member of the Russian Communist Party (bolshevik), Kurdyukov entered the service of the People's Commissariat of Foreign Affairs of the Soviet Union in 1936.

His first diplomatic posting came in 1946 when he was posted as the Consul-General of the Soviet Union in Tianjin, China, until 1948. From 1949 to 1952 he was Assistant Manager of the 1st Far East Department of the Soviet Ministry of Foreign Affairs, and from 1952 to 1953 he was posted as Adviser at the Embassy of the Soviet Union to the People's Republic of China, acting for a time as chargé d'affaires.

Returning to Moscow in 1955, he managed the Far East Department of the Foreign Affairs Ministry until 1957, when in 1958 he was posted as the Senior Political Adviser at the Permanent Mission of the Soviet Union to the United Nations until June 1959.

On 23 June 1959 he was appointed as Ambassador of the Soviet Union to Australia, and presented his Letters of Credence to Governor-General of Australia William Slim on 10 August 1959.

While Kurdyukov was ambassador to Australia, Australian Security Intelligence Organisation (ASIO) and New Zealand Security Intelligence Service (NZSIS) exploited an opportunity to target Soviet intelligence in a "sting operation". During September 1960, Kay Marshall, an Englishwoman working as a civil servant in New Zealand, had reported approaches from Soviet agents. At the request of NZSIS, Marshall allowed Soviet agents to believe that she would cooperate, and moved in December 1960 to Australia, where she liaised with ASIO. For two years, Marshall's Soviet controller, Ivan Skripov (First Secretary of the Soviet Embassy in Canberra) assigned her small tasks, in order to gauge her suitability as an agent. Finally, in December 1962, Skripov instructed Marshall to take a package to a contact in Adelaide. The package, which was inspected by ASIO agents, was said to contain: a device used to compress data into short, high-speed signals, when attached to a radio transmitter and; coded transmission timetables for a Soviet radio station. While Marshall took the reassembled package to the rendezvous as requested, Skripov's contact did not attend. On 7 February 1963, while Kurdyukov was on sick leave in Moscow, the Australian government released photos of meetings between Skripov and Marshall, accused Skripov of being a spy and sent the Soviet embassy a note declaring Skripov persona non grata due to "elaborate preparations for espionage"; he was given seven days to leave the country. The Australian government didn't divulge what secrets Skripov may have been seeking, but it was reported that workers at the Woomera missile range underwent interrogation. The Soviet authorities responded by stating that the material proved nothing and were produced to hinder the development of friendly relations between the Soviet Union and Australia. Kurdyukov did not return to Canberra.

On 9 July 1968, Kurdyukov was appointed as Ambassador of the Soviet Union to Uganda, and presented his credentials to President of Uganda Milton Obote in Kampala on 5 October 1968. Kurdyukov held the post until 29 March 1972, when he retired.
