= Andrey Urnov =

Russian diplomat (1937–2025)

- Андрей Урнов

Ambassador of Russia to Armenia
- In office 13 September 1994 – 12 November 1998
- President: Boris Yeltsin
- Preceded by: Vladimir Stupishin
- Succeeded by: Anatoly Dryukov

Ambassador of the USSR/Russia to Namibia
- In office 15 August 1990 – 5 July 1994
- President: Mikhail Gorbachev; Boris Yeltsin
- Preceded by: position established
- Succeeded by: Baxtiyor Hakimov

Personal details
- Born: Andrey Yuryevich Urnov; 10 November 1937 Moscow, Russian SFSR, USSR
- Died: 10 August 2025 (aged 87) Moscow, Russia
- Party: CPSU (until 1991)
- Education: Moscow State Institute of International Relations (DS)
- Occupation: Diplomat

Andrey Yuryevich Urnov (Russian: Андрей Юрьевич Урнов; 10 November 1937 – 10 August 2025) was a Russian diplomat. He was the elder brother of Soviet actor Mark Urnov.

== Life and career ==
Born in Moscow on 10 November 1937, Urnov's mother was an actress in the Russian Army Theatre and attended the Mikhail Shchepkin Higher Theatre School. His father worked on microscopes at a closed institute. His paternal grandfather, Mark Kuchnir, was a member of the Constitutional Democratic Party, while his maternal grandfather was a member of the Socialist Revolutionary Party. He graduated from the Moscow State Institute of International Relations in 1961 with a Doctor of Sciences in international relations. He served as deputy head of the International Department of the Communist Party of the Soviet Union and joined the Soviet Union's Ministry of Foreign Affairs in 1990. From 15 August 1990 to 5 July 1994, he was ambassador of the USSR/Russia to Namibia. He then served as ambassador of Russia to Armenia from 13 September 1994 to 12 November 1998.

Urnov died in Moscow on 10 August 2025, at the age of 87.

== Awards ==
- Order of the Badge of Honour
- Order of Friendship of Peoples
- Order of the Companions of O. R. Tambo
