= Vladimir Stupishin =

Russian diplomat

- Владимир Ступишин

1st Ambassador of Russia to Armenia
- In office 2 April 1992 – 13 September 1994
- Preceded by: Position created
- Succeeded by: Andrey Urnov

Personal details
- Born: 27 November 1932 Moscow, Russian SFSR, Soviet Union
- Died: 23 December 2016 (aged 84) Moscow, Russia

Vladimir Stupishin (27 November 1932 – 23 December 2016) was a Russian diplomat who served as Russia's first Ambassador to Armenia from April 1992 until September 1994 following the break-up of the Soviet Union.

Stupishin died on 23 December 2016, at the age of 84.
