= Alexander Blokhin =

Russian diplomat

- Александр Блохин
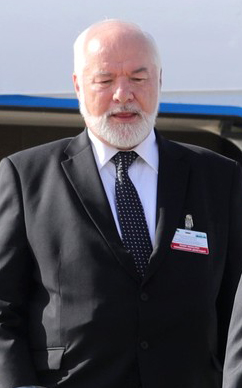
- Blokhin in 2017

Ambassador of Russia to Turkmenistan
- In office 5 May 2011 – 6 April 2023
- Preceded by: Igor Blatov
- Succeeded by: Ivan Volynkin

Ambassador of Russia to Australia
- In office 10 December 2005 – 29 June 2010
- Preceded by: Leonid Moiseyev
- Succeeded by: Vladimir Morozov

Ambassador of Russia to Belarus
- In office 26 July 2002 – 14 July 2005
- Preceded by: Vyacheslav Dolgov
- Succeeded by: Aleksandr Surikov

Ambassador of Russia to Azerbaijan
- In office 25 June 1995 – 6 January 2000
- Preceded by: Valter Shoniya
- Succeeded by: Nikolai Ryabov

Personal details
- Born: 12 January 1951 (age 75) Ivanovo, RSFSR, Soviet Union)
- Education: Ivanovo Power Institute
- Awards: Medal of the Order "For Merit to the Fatherland" First Class, Order of Honour

Alexander Viktorovich Blokhin (Russian: Александр Викторович Блохин; born 12 January 1951) is a Russian diplomat. He served as the Ambassador Extraordinary and Plenipotentiary of the Russian Federation to Australia between 2005 and 2010. He served as Ambassador of Russia to Turkmenistan from 5 May 2011 to 6 April 2023.

== Career ==
Blokhin graduated from the Ivanovo Power Institute in 1974, and for the next three years worked in various capacities at Fizpribor in Kirov. From 1977 to 1978, Blokhin was attached to the USSR Ministry of Defence, and from 1983 to 1990 was the chief engineer of the Shchelkovo Bioindustrial Complex.

In 1990, Blokhin was elected a member of the Supreme Soviet of Russia, and served until its dissolution in 1993. Since 1992, he has worked in the Ministry of Foreign Affairs.

Alexander Blokhin's first ambassadorial appointment came in 1995, when he was appointed at ambassador of Russia to Azerbaijan, a post he held until 1999. From January 2000 he was the Minister for Federal Affairs, Nationalities and Migration in Mikhail Kasyanov's Cabinet, until October 2001 when the position was abolished.

In September 2002, he began his next ambassador post as Ambassador of Russia to Belarus, staying in Minsk until July 2005. On 10 November 2005, by decree of President Vladimir Putin, Blokhin was appointed as Ambassador of Russia to Australia. As Russia's ambassador to Australia, Alexander Blokhin was concurrently accredited as the non-resident ambassador to Fiji, Vanuatu and Nauru, in January 2006, February 2006 and March 2006, respectively.

Blokhin speaks Russian and English.
