= List of ambassadors of Russia to Turkmenistan =

Ambassador of the Russian Federation to Turkmenistan
- Russiýa Federasiýasynyň Türkmenistandaky Ilçihanasy
- Emblem of the Russian Foreign Ministry

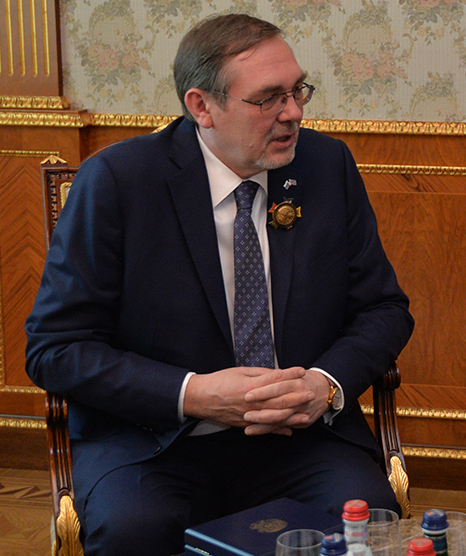
- Incumbent; Ivan Volynkin since 6 April 2023
- Ministry of Foreign Affairs; Embassy of Russia in Ashgabat
- Style: His Excellency; The Honourable
- Reports to: Minister of Foreign Affairs
- Seat: Ashgabat
- Appointer: President of Russia
- Term length: At the pleasure of the president
- Website: Embassy of Russia in Turkmenistan

The ambassador extraordinary and plenipotentiary of the Russian Federation to Turkmenistan is the official representative of the president and the government of the Russian Federation to the president and the government of Turkmenistan.

The ambassador and his staff work at large in the Embassy of Russia in Ashgabat. There is a consulate general in Türkmenbaşy. The post of Russian ambassador to Turkmenistan is currently held by Ivan Volynkin, incumbent since 6 April 2023.

== History of diplomatic relations ==
With the dissolution of the Soviet Union in 1991, diplomatic relations between the Russian Federation and the Republic of Turkmenistan were first established on 8 April 1992. The first ambassador, Vadim Cherepov, was appointed on 27 March 1992.

== Representatives of the Russian Federation to Turkmenistan (1992–present) ==
Name	Title	Appointment	Termination	Notes
Vadim Cherepov	Ambassador	27 March 1992	31 December 1997	
Anatoly Shchelkunov	Ambassador	31 December 1997	13 May 2002	
Andrey Molochkov	Ambassador	7 July 2003	2005	Credentials presented on 4 August 2003
Igor Blatov	Ambassador	16 January 2006	5 May 2011	Credentials presented on 11 April 2006
Alexander Blokhin	Ambassador	5 May 2011	6 April 2023	Credentials presented on 8 July 2011
Ivan Volynkin	Ambassador	6 April 2023		Credentials presented on 24 May 2023
