= List of diplomatic missions in Georgia (country) =

Diplomatic missions in Georgia currently comprise 41 embassies in Tbilisi. Many other countries have non-resident embassies. Russia closed its embassy right after the beginning of the war in South Ossetia in August 2008 and diplomatic relations between the two countries have ended.

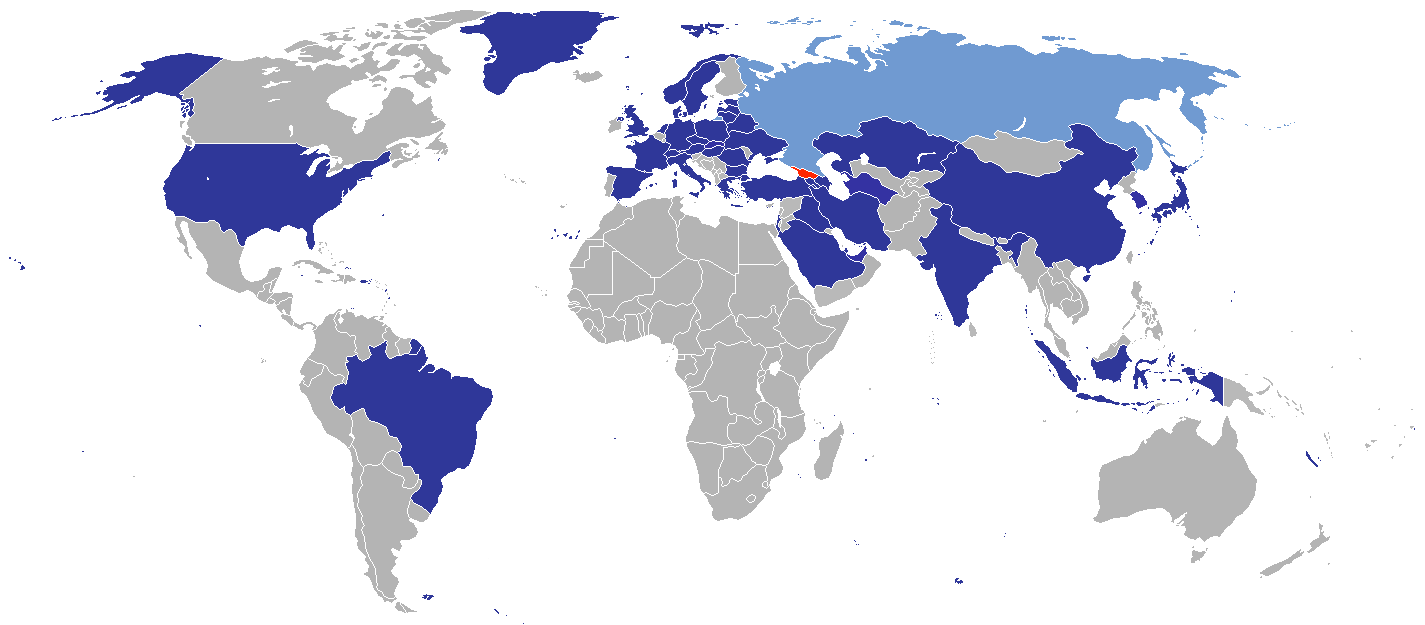
Map of diplomatic missions in Georgia

== Diplomatic missions in Tbilisi ==
=== Embassies ===
1. Armenia
2. Austria
3. Azerbaijan
4. Belarus
5. Brazil
6. Bulgaria
7. China
8. Czech Republic
9. Denmark
10. Estonia
11. France
12. Germany
13. Greece
14. Holy See
15. Hungary
16. India
17. Iran
18. Iraq
19. Israel
20. Italy
21. Japan
22. Kazakhstan
23. Latvia
24. Lithuania
25. Netherlands
26. Norway
27. Poland
28. Qatar
29. Romania
30. Saudi Arabia
31. Slovakia
32. South Korea
33. Sovereign Military Order of Malta
34. Sweden
35. Switzerland
36. Turkey
37. Turkmenistan
38. Ukraine
39. United Arab Emirates
40. United Kingdom
41. United States

=== Other missions or delegations ===
1. European Union (Delegation)
2. Indonesia (Embassy office)
3. Russia (Interests Section)
4. Spain (Embassy office)
5. United Nations (Resident coordinator's office)

=== Gallery ===
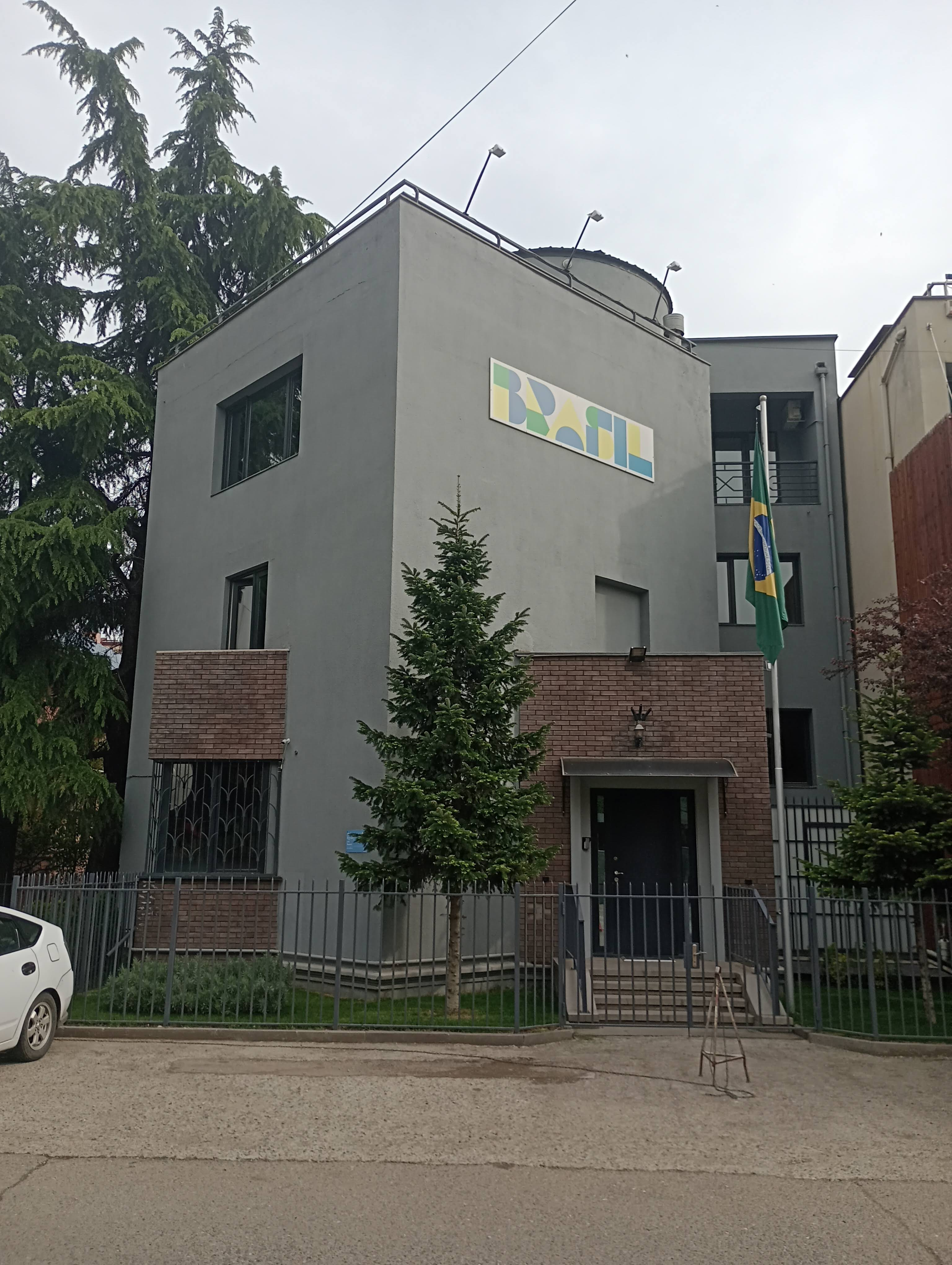
Embassy of Brazil

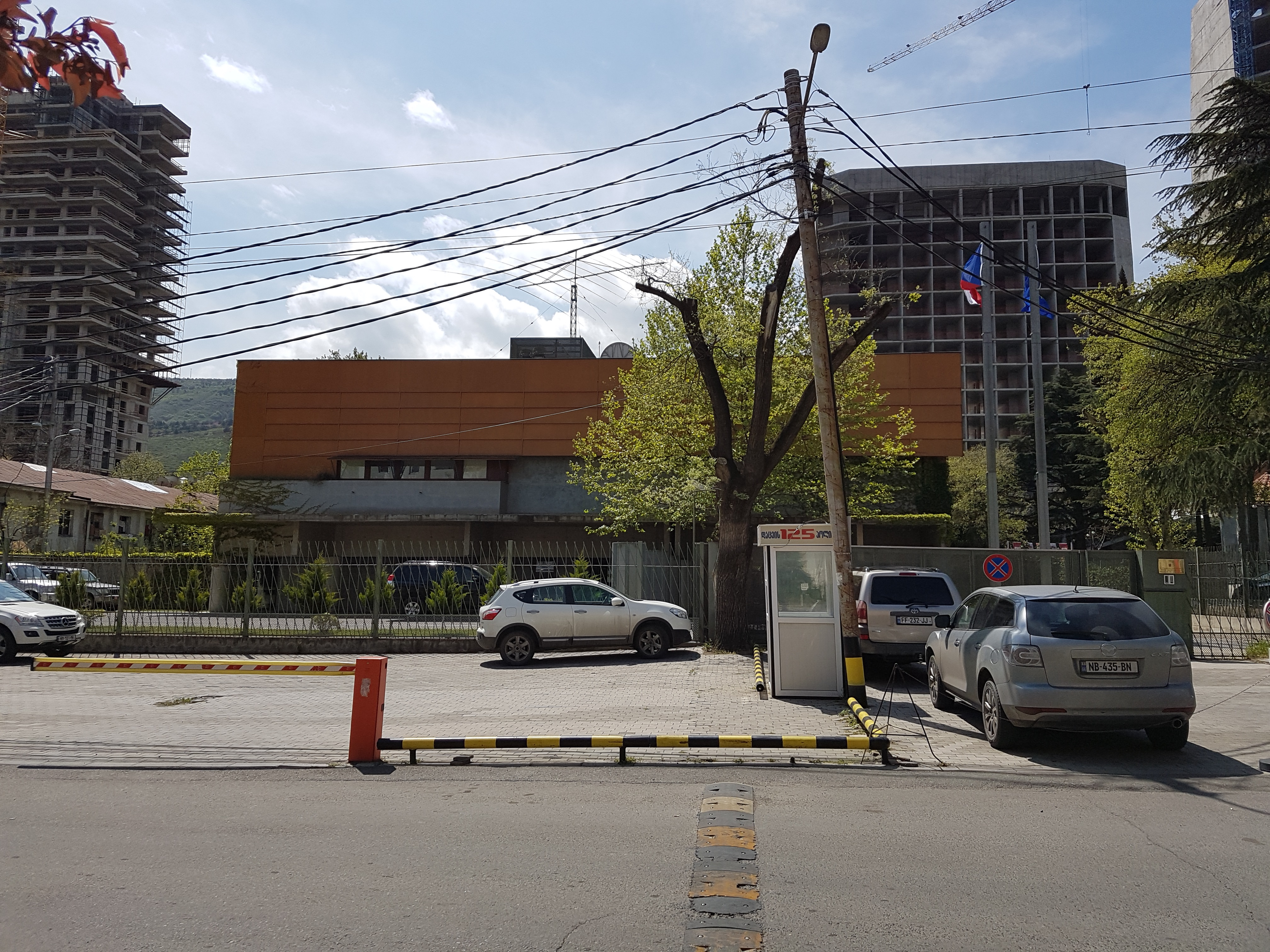
Embassy of Czechia

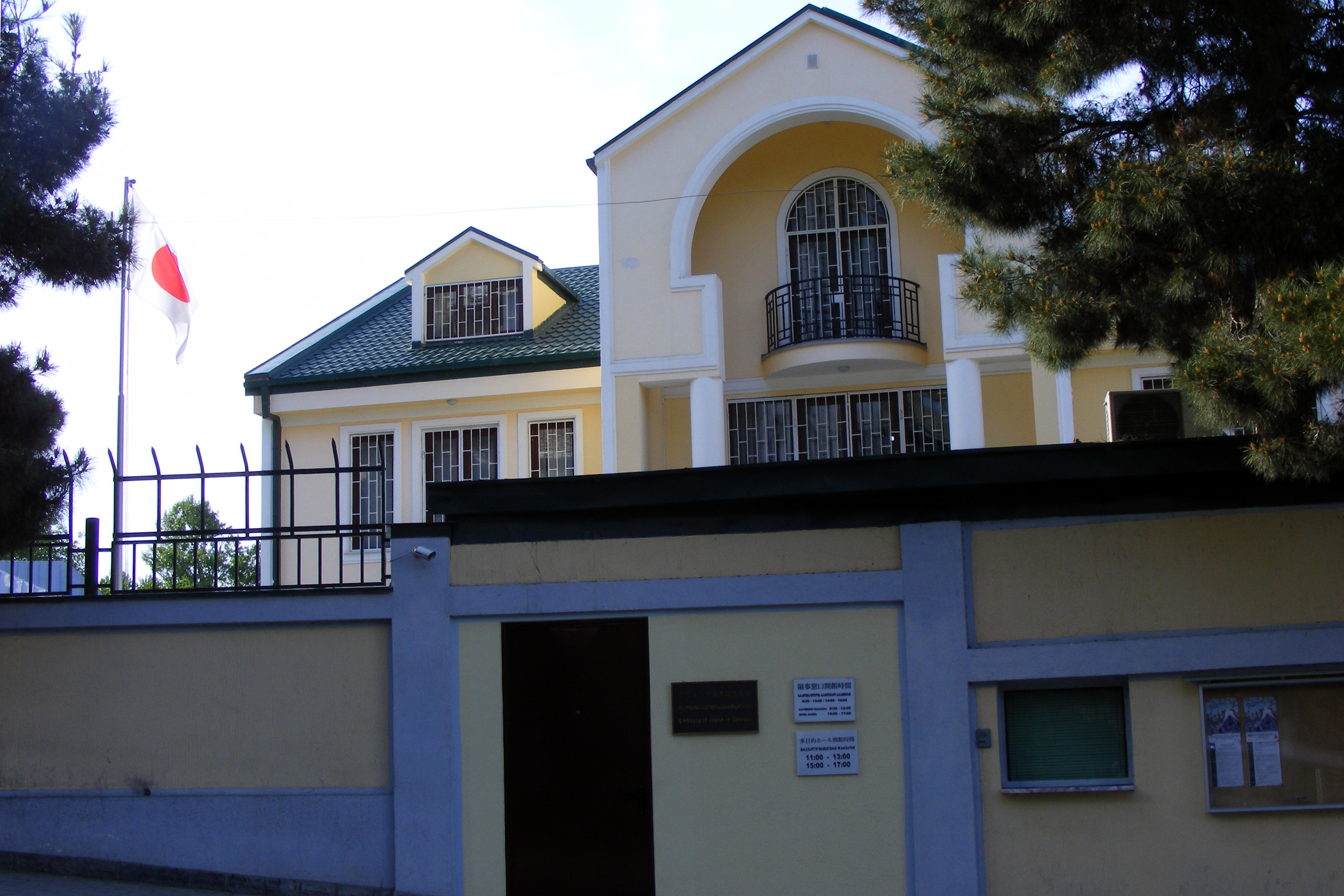
Embassy of Japan

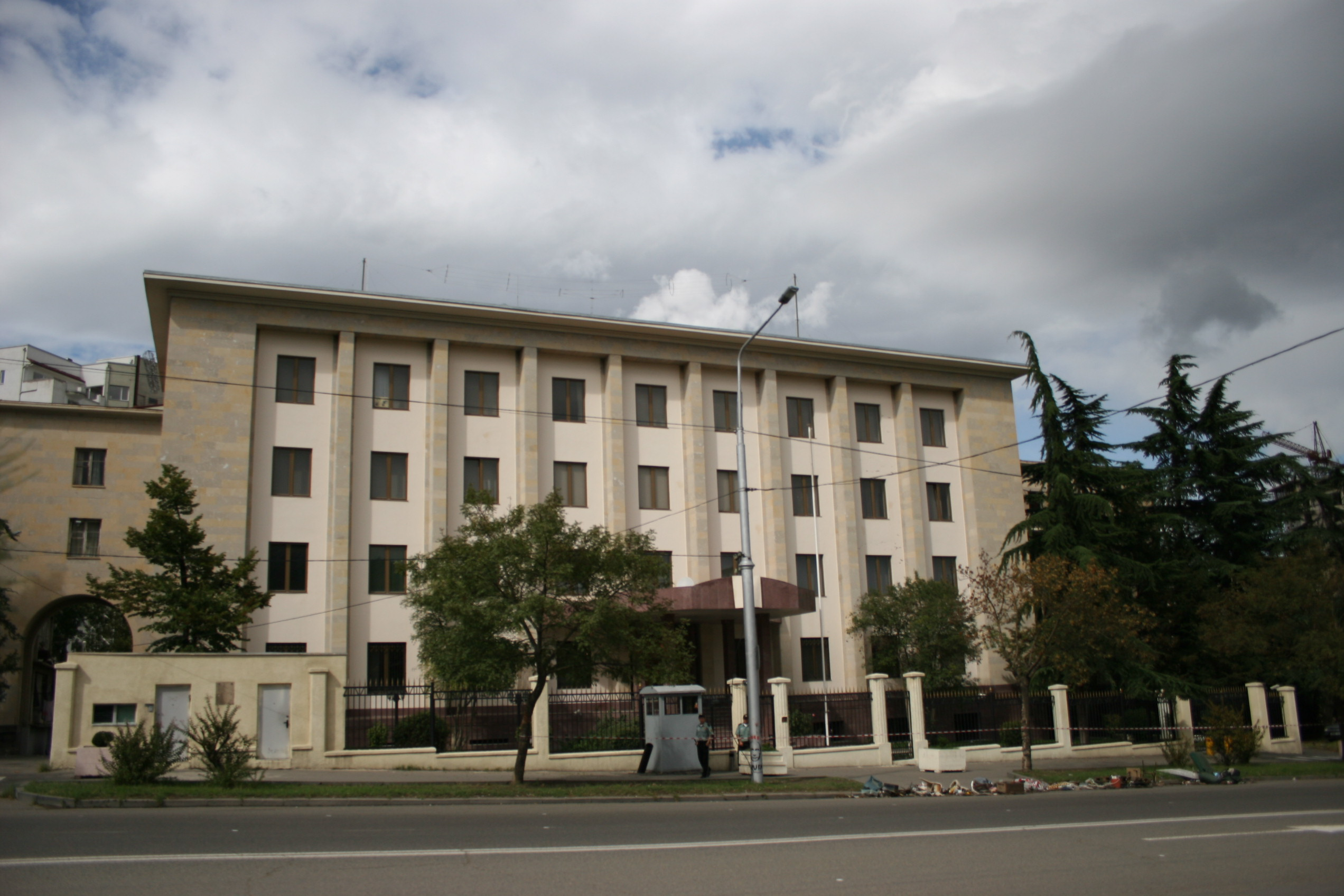
Russian Interests Section

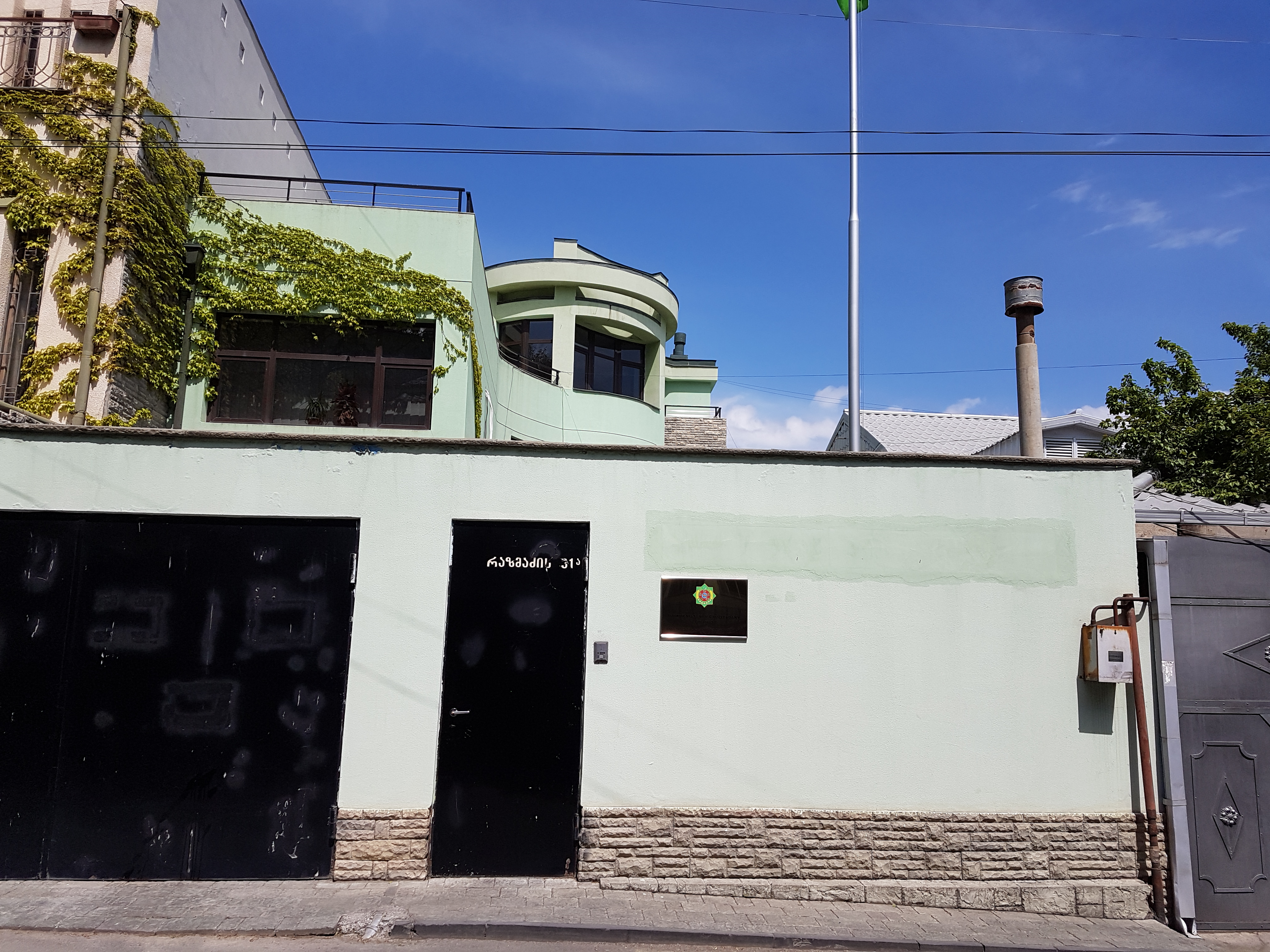
Embassy of Turkmenistan

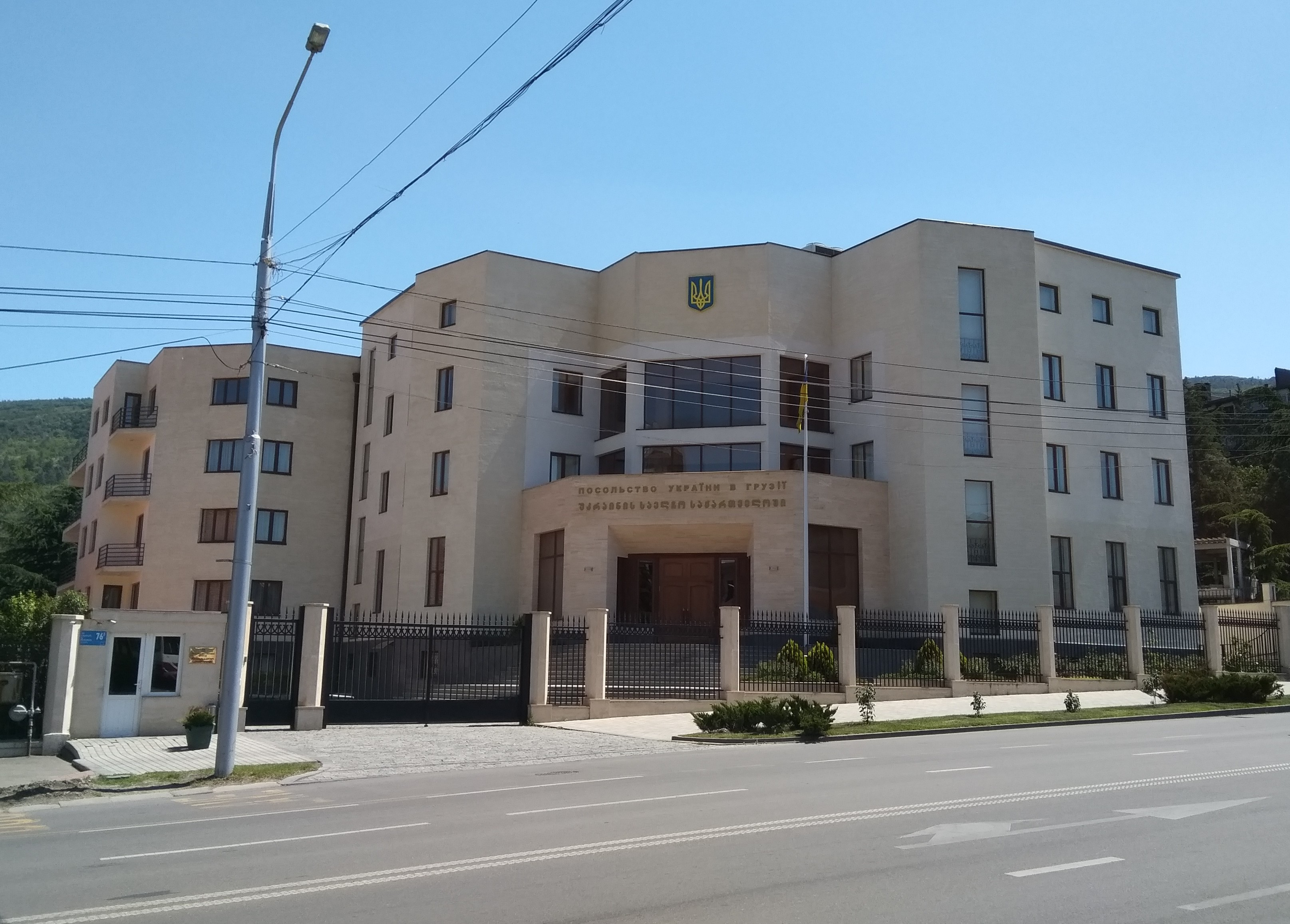
Embassy of Ukraine

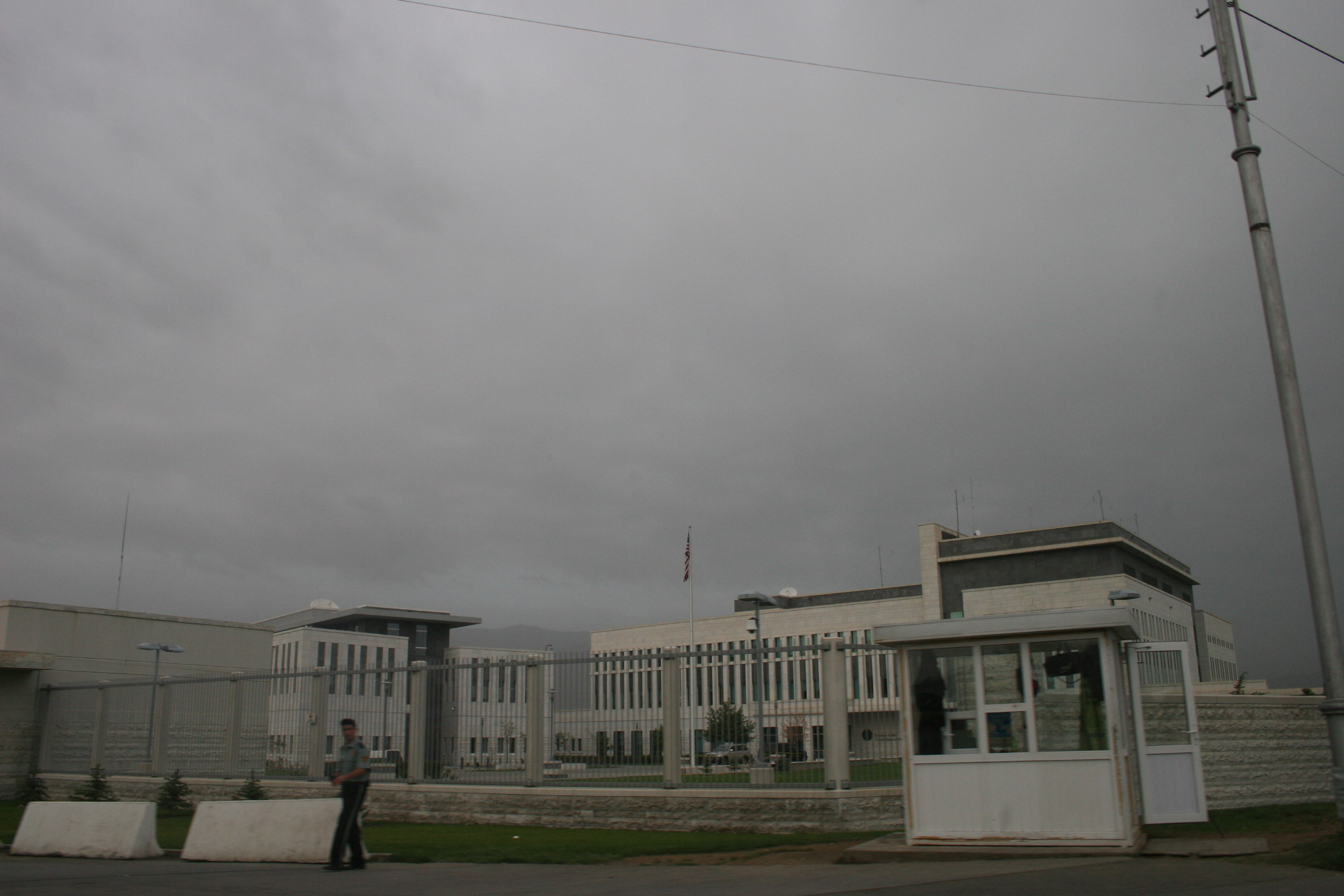
Embassy of the United States

== Consulates-General in Batumi ==
1. Armenia
2. Azerbaijan
3. Iran
4. Turkey

== Non-resident embassies accredited to Georgia ==
=== Resident in Ankara, Turkey ===
1. Albania
2. Algeria
3. Angola
4. Argentina
5. Australia
6. Bahrain
7. Bangladesh
8. Bosnia and Herzegovina
9. Burkina Faso
10. Burundi
11. Cambodia
12. Canada
13. Chad
14. Colombia
15. Congo-Brazzaville
16. Dominican Republic
17. Ecuador
18. El Salvador
19. Equatorial Guinea
20. Ethiopia
21. Ghana
22. Guatemala
23. Guinea
24. Ireland
25. Ivory Coast
26. Kenya
27. Mauritania
28. Mexico
29. Oman
30. Panama
31. Paraguay
32. Peru
33. Philippines
34. Portugal
35. Somalia
36. Spain
37. Sudan
38. Sri Lanka
39. Thailand
40. Tunisia
41. Zambia

=== Resident in Baku, Azerbaijan ===
1. Afghanistan
2. Belgium
3. Croatia
4. Cuba
5. Jordan
6. Kyrgyzstan
7. Malaysia
8. Moldova
9. Pakistan
10. Tajikistan
11. Uzbekistan

=== Resident in Kyiv, Ukraine ===
1. Indonesia
2. Montenegro
3. Morocco
4. Slovenia
5. South Africa

=== Resident in Moscow, Russia ===
1. Bolivia
2. Congo-Kinshasa
3. Mali
4. North Korea
5. Sierra Leone
6. South Sudan
7. Tanzania
8. Uganda

=== Resident in Warsaw, Poland ===
1. Chile
2. Iceland
3. New Zealand

=== Resident in Yerevan, Armenia ===
1. Egypt
2. Kuwait
3. Lebanon
4. Serbia

=== Other resident locations ===
1. Barbados (Havana)
2. Cyprus (Athens)
3. Finland (Helsinki)
4. Guyana (Brasília)
5. Honduras (Berlin)
6. Laos (Vienna)
7. Luxembourg (Luxembourg City)
8. Malawi (Berlin)
9. Malta (Valletta)
10. Mongolia (Astana)
11. Myanmar (Prague)
12. Nepal (Vienna)
13. Nigeria (Vilnius)
14. San Marino (City of San Marino)
15. Uruguay (Bucharest)
16. Vietnam (Astana)
17. Zimbabwe (Rome)
