= List of ambassadors of Russia to Armenia =

Ambassador of the Russian Federation to Armenia
- Emblem of the Russian Foreign Ministry

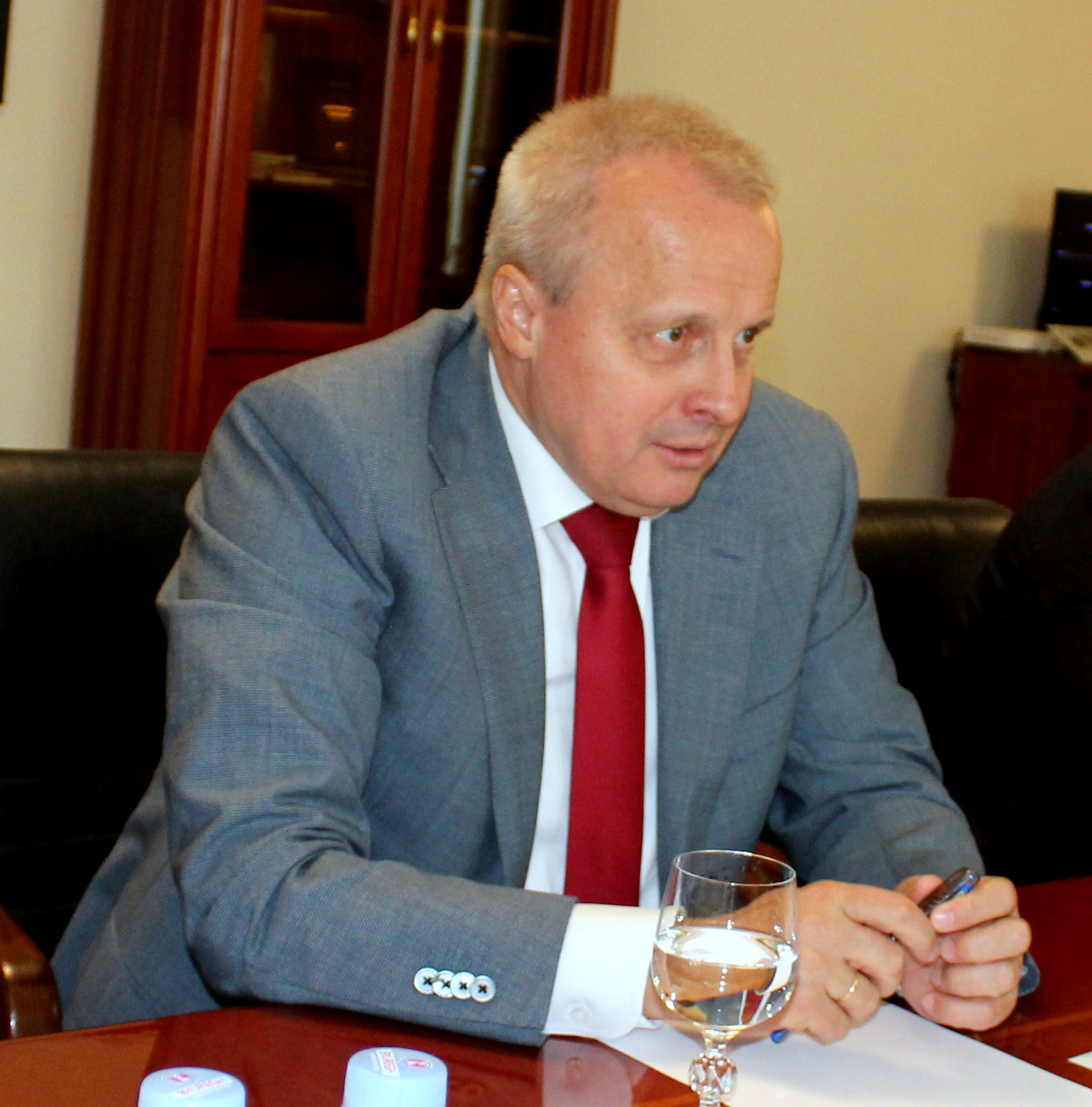
- Incumbent; Sergey Kopyrkin since 6 April 2018
- Ministry of Foreign Affairs; Embassy of Russia in Yerevan
- Style: His Excellency; The Honourable
- Reports to: Minister of Foreign Affairs
- Seat: Yerevan
- Appointer: President of Russia
- Term length: At the pleasure of the president
- Website: Embassy of Russia in Armenia

The ambassador extraordinary and plenipotentiary of the Russian Federation to the Republic of Armenia is the official representative of the president and the government of the Russian Federation to the president and the government of Armenia.

The ambassador and his staff work at large in the Embassy of Russia in Yerevan. There is a consulate general in Gyumri. The post of Russian ambassador to Armenia is currently held by Sergey Kopyrkin, incumbent since 6 April 2018.

== History of diplomatic relations ==
Diplomatic relations were briefly established between the Russian Soviet Federative Socialist Republic and the Democratic Republic of Armenia in 1920. Boris Legran was the Russian representative between 28 July and 29 November 1920, prior to the Armenian republic's conquest by Soviet forces and its 1922 amalgamation into the Transcaucasian Socialist Federative Soviet Republic. With the dissolution of the Soviet Union in 1991, the Republic of Armenia was established as an independent country, with diplomatic relations established with the Russian Federation on 3 April 1992.

== List of representatives ==
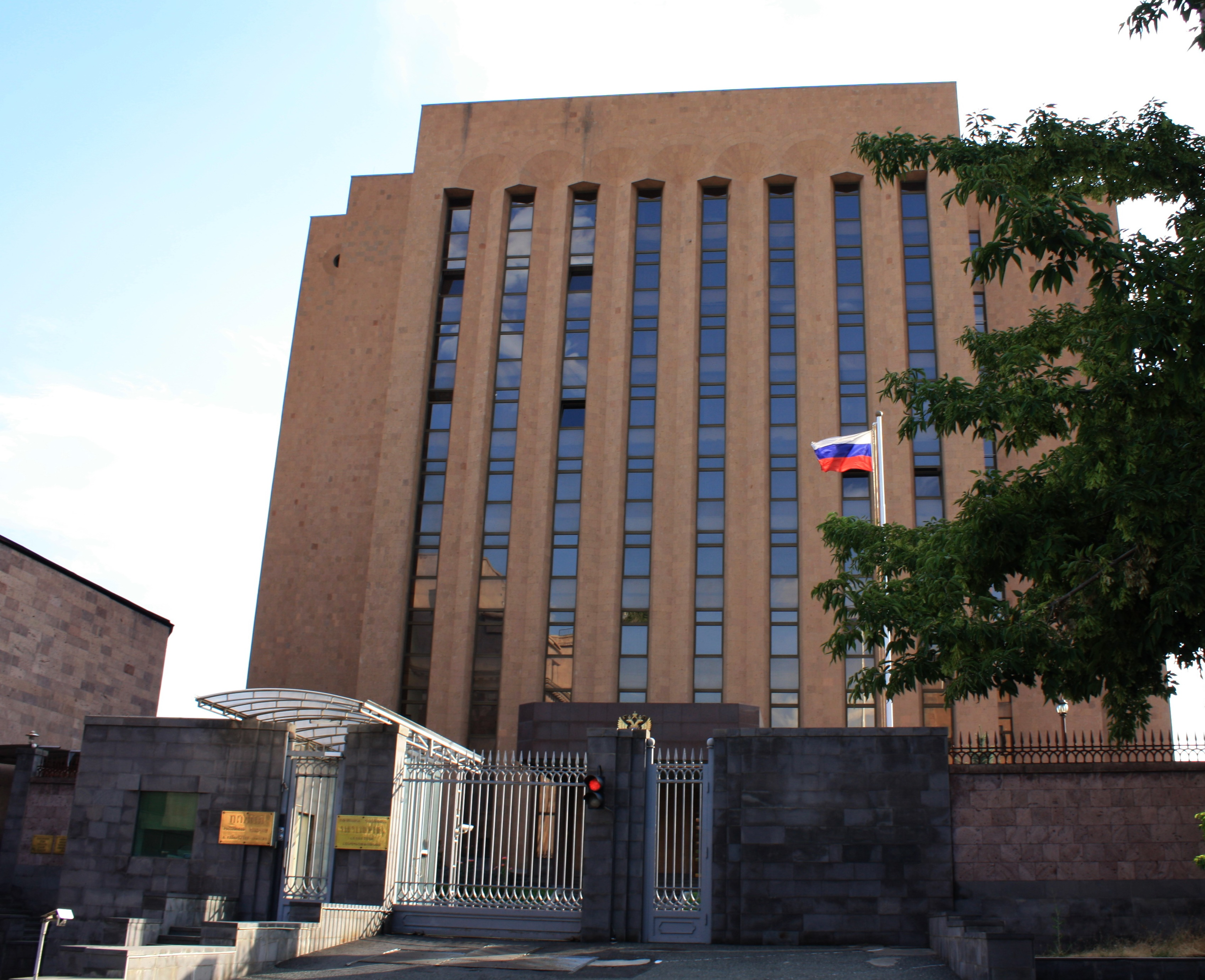
The Embassy of Russia in Yerevan

=== Russian Soviet Federative Socialist Republic to the Democratic Republic of Armenia (1920) ===
Name	Title	Appointment	Termination	Notes
Boris Legran		28 July 1920	29 November 1920	

=== Russian Federation to Armenia (1992–present) ===
Name	Title	Appointment	Termination	Notes
Vladimir Stupishin	Ambassador	2 March 1992	13 September 1994	
Andrey Urnov	Ambassador	13 September 1994	12 November 1998	
Anatoly Dryukov	Ambassador	12 November 1998	24 March 2005	
Nikolai Pavlov	Ambassador	24 March 2005	7 July 2009	
Vyacheslav Kovalenko	Ambassador	7 July 2009	21 March 2013	
Ivan Volynkin	Ambassador	21 March 2013	6 April 2018	
Sergey Kopyrkin	Ambassador	6 April 2018		
