= Nikolai Sudarikov =

Soviet diplomat

Nikolai Georgiyevich Sudarikov (Russian: Николай Георгиевич Судариков), (2 February 1913 - 2000), was a Soviet diplomat.

On 20 October 1979, Sudarikov was appointed Ambassador of the Soviet Union to Australia, with concurrent accreditation to Fiji. He was relieved of his post on 23 April 1983 by the Presidium of the USSR Supreme Soviet, and entered into retirement, a day after the Australian government expelled First Secretary of the Soviet embassy in Canberra Valery Ivanov on suspicions of being a spy.
