= Anatoly Dryukov =

Soviet and Russian diplomat (1936–2023)

- Анатолий Дрюков

Ambassador of Russia to Armenia
- In office 12 November 1998 – 24 March 2005
- Preceded by: Andrey Urnov
- Succeeded by: Nikolai Pavlov

Ambassador of the Soviet Union/Russia to India
- In office 15 July 1991 – 1 May 1996
- Preceded by: Vasily Rykov
- Succeeded by: Albert Chernyshyov

Ambassador of the Soviet Union to Singapore
- In office 15 July 1987 – 24 August 1990
- Preceded by: Vladimir Semyonov
- Succeeded by: Nikolai Loginov

Personal details
- Born: 4 September 1936 Voronezh, Russian SFSR, Soviet Union
- Died: 12 March 2023 (aged 86)
- Education: Moscow State Institute of International Relations
- Awards: Honored Employee of the Diplomatic Service (Russia); Order of Friendship; Mkhitar Gosh Medal (Armenia)

Anatoly Matveyevich Dryukov (Russian: Анатолий Матвеевич Дрюков; 4 September 1936 – 12 March 2023) was a Soviet and Russian diplomat. He served in various diplomatic roles from 1960 onwards, and was ambassador of the Soviet Union to Singapore between 1987 and 1990, ambassador of the Soviet Union and then Russia to India from 1991 to 1996, and ambassador of Russia to Armenia from 1998 to 2005.

== Career ==
Dryukov was born on 4 September 1936, in Voronezh, then part of the Russian Soviet Federative Socialist Republic, in the Soviet Union. Dryukov graduated from the Moscow State Institute of International Relations in 1960, and went to work at the Soviet Ministry of Foreign Affairs. He held postings both in the central apparatus, and in the Soviet missions abroad, serving in the embassies in Pakistan and Zambia. In 1987 he was appointed ambassador of the Soviet Union to Singapore, a post he held until 1990. In 1990 he became head of the Main Directorate of Personnel and Educational Institutions of the Ministry of Foreign Affairs.

On 1 May 1991, Dryukov was appointed ambassador of the Soviet Union to India. He continued to hold the position after the dissolution of the Soviet Union in December that year, becoming the representative of Russia. He was recalled in 1996, and became Inspector General of the Ministry of Foreign Affairs, and ambassador-at-large. Between 12 November 1998 and 24 March 2005 Dryukov was ambassador of Russia to Armenia. As ambassador, Dryukov announced plans in 2002 to cancel Armenian state debt to Russia in exchange for several Armenian enterprises, including hydroelectric stations on the Sevan–Hrazdan Cascade. In 2005, Dryukov was awarded Armenia's Mkhitar Gosh Medal for merits in strengthening friendly ties between the two states. Despite the accolade, he was forced to deny that Russo-Armenian relations had deteriorated, or that Russia viewed Armenia as a vassal state following equities-for-debt agreement. After retiring from the diplomatic service, he worked with the Gorchakov Foundation, as their Director of Grant Programs, and then as advisor to the executive director.

Dryukov died on 12 March 2023, at the age of 86. He was married, with two children. In addition to his native Russian, Dryukov spoke English and Urdu. Over his career he had received the Order of Friendship on 4 March 1998, and the title of Honoured Employee of the Diplomatic Service of Russia, on 19 November 2002.
