= Ivan Volynkin =

Russian diplomat (born 1959)

- Иван Волынкин
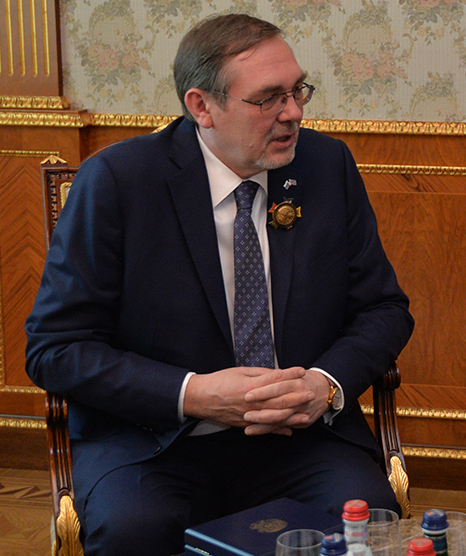

Ambassador of Russia to Turkmenistan
- Incumbent
- Assumed office 6 April 2023
- Minister: Sergey Lavrov
- Preceded by: Alexander Blokhin

Ambassador of Russia to Armenia
- In office 21 March 2013 – 6 April 2018
- Preceded by: Vyacheslav Kovalenko
- Succeeded by: Sergei Kopyrkin

Personal details
- Born: 11 March 1959 (age 67) Moscow, Russian SFSR, Soviet Union
- Education: MGIMO

Ivan Kirillovich Volynkin (Russian: Иван Кириллович Волынкин; born March 11, 1959) is a Soviet and Russian diplomat. He holds the rank of Ambassador Extraordinary and Plenipotentiary (2019).

== Biography ==
Born on March 11, 1959, in Moscow, he was the son of Kirill Ivanovich Volynkin (1925–1984)—a candidate of economic sciences who taught geography at the Peoples' Friendship University of Russia.

Ivan Kirillovich attended a school with a specialized focus on mathematics. After finishing school in 1976, Volynkin enrolled at MGIMO (Moscow State Institute of International Relations) under the USSR Ministry of Foreign Affairs, having also prepared a backup plan to study finance. In 1981, he completed his pre-graduation internship at the USSR Trade Mission in the Socialist Federal Republic of Yugoslavia.

He has been in the diplomatic service since 1981. From 1981 to 1987, he served at the USSR Embassy in Yugoslavia. From 1991 to 1996, he served at the Russian Embassy in Yugoslavia. From 1999 to 2002, he served at the Russian Consulate General in San Francisco. In 2003, he served at the Russian Embassy in Serbia and Montenegro, and also worked with the OSCE mission in Serbia and Montenegro. From 2005 to 2008, he served as Minister-Counselor at the Russian Embassy in Georgia. In November 2007, he was declared persona non grata. From August to November 2008, he served as Minister-Counselor at the Russian Embassy in Macedonia. From 2009 to 2013, he served as an aide to the Minister of Foreign Affairs of Russia, Sergey Lavrov, and as deputy director of the General Secretariat (Department) of the Russian Foreign Ministry. From March 21, 2013, to April 6, 2018, he served as Ambassador Extraordinary and Plenipotentiary of Russia to Armenia. He presented his letters of credence on May 25, 2013. From 2018 to 2023, he was the Director of the Consular Department of the Russian Foreign Ministry. Concurrently, in 2019, he was considered for the position of Deputy Minister of Foreign Affairs of Russia. Since April 6, 2023, he has served as Ambassador Extraordinary and Plenipotentiary of Russia to Turkmenistan.

He is proficient in Serbian and English.

=== Diplomatic Rank ===
- Envoy Extraordinary and Plenipotentiary, 2nd Class (October 24, 2007).
- Envoy Extraordinary and Plenipotentiary, 1st Class (June 4, 2014).
- Ambassador Extraordinary and Plenipotentiary (October 1, 2019).

His spouse is Svetlana Merabovna Ramishvili. and has a son and daughter.

== Awards ==
- Order of Friendship (September 10, 2017) — for a major contribution to the implementation of the foreign policy course of the Russian Federation.
- Order of Friendship (Armenia, April 3, 2018) — for a significant contribution to the development of diplomatic relations between the Republic of Armenia and the Russian Federation, and for strengthening the friendship between the Armenian and Russian peoples.
- Order of Honuor (May 2, 2024) — for a significant contribution to the implementation of the foreign policy course of the Russian Federation and for many years of conscientious diplomatic service.
- Commemorative silver badge of Turkmenistan "Magtymguly Pyragynyň 300 ýyllygyna" (Turkmenistan, December 10, 2024) — for special merits in reviving the cultural heritage and ancestral spiritual values of the Turkmen people; in studying, carefully preserving, promoting, and passing on to future generations the creative legacy of the classic Turkmen poet and great thinker Magtymguly Pyragy; in expanding the cultural ties of independent, neutral Turkmenistan with nations across the globe and international organizations; in fostering the convergence and enrichment of cultures and strengthening the bonds of friendship and cooperation among peoples during the "Revival of the New Era of the Powerful State"; and in recognition of the 300th anniversary of the classic Turkmen poet Magtymguly Pyragy.
- Commemorative silver badge "30th Anniversary of Turkmenistan’s Permanent Neutrality" (Turkmenistan, December 25, 2025) — awarded in recognition of significant personal contributions to strengthening the independence and the legal status of permanent neutrality of Turkmenistan; supporting and promoting a policy of international peace and trust globally; achieving success in implementing programs for the development of science, healthcare, and other sectors within the country; engaging in fruitful state and public service; demonstrating many years of conscientious and honest labor; and in honor of the glorious 30th anniversary of Turkmenistan's attainment of the legal status of permanent neutrality.
- Jubilee medal of Turkmenistan "30th Anniversary of Turkmenistan’s Neutrality" (Turkmenistan, December 25, 2025) — awarded in recognition of major achievements in strengthening the independence and the legal status of permanent neutrality of Turkmenistan, as well as supporting and promoting a policy of international peace and trust globally, and in honor of the glorious 30th anniversary of Turkmenistan's attainment of the status of permanent neutrality.
