= List of ambassadors of Russia to Vietnam =

Ambassador of the Russian Federation to Vietnam
- Emblem of the Russian Foreign Ministry
- Incumbent; Gennady Bezdetko since 25 March 2021
- Ministry of Foreign Affairs; Embassy of Russia in Hanoi
- Style: His Excellency; The Honourable
- Reports to: Minister of Foreign Affairs
- Seat: Hanoi
- Appointer: President of Russia
- Term length: At the pleasure of the president
- Formation: 1954
- First holder: Aleksandr Lavrishchev
- Website: Embassy of Russia in Vietnam

The ambassador extraordinary and plenipotentiary of the Russian Federation to the Socialist Republic of Vietnam is the official representative of the president and the government of the Russian Federation to the president and the government of Vietnam.

The ambassador and his staff work at large in the Embassy of Russia in Hanoi. There are consulates general in Da Nang and Ho Chi Minh City.

The post of Russian ambassador to Vietnam is currently held by Gennady Bezdetko, incumbent since 25 March 2021.

== History of diplomatic relations ==
Diplomatic relations at the mission level between the Soviet Union and Democratic Republic of Vietnam (known as North Vietnam after 1954) were first established in January 1950. The first ambassador, Aleksandr Lavrishchev, was appointed on 11 August 1954, and presented his credentials on 4 November 1954. Diplomatic relations with the Provisional Revolutionary Government of the Republic of South Vietnam were established in June 1969 and carried out through the Soviet embassy in Burma. Between 4 June 1973 and 27 December 1976 the Soviet ambassador to Burma, Aleksey Elizavetin, was concurrently accredited as Soviet ambassador to South Vietnam. With the reunification of North and South Vietnam in July 1976 the ambassador to North Vietnam, Boris Chaplin, continued as ambassador to the Socialist Republic of Vietnam. With the dissolution of the Soviet Union in 1991, the Soviet ambassador, Rashit Khamidulin, continued as representative of the Russian Federation until 1996.

== List of representatives (1954–present) ==
=== Soviet Union to North Vietnam (1954–1976) ===
Name	Title	Appointment	Termination	Notes
Aleksandr Lavrishchev	Ambassador	11 August 1954	21 January 1956	
Mikhail Zimyanin	Ambassador	21 January 1956	3 January 1958	
Leonid Sokolov	Ambassador	3 January 1958	10 April 1961	
Suren Tovmasyan	Ambassador	10 April 1961	7 September 1964	
Ilya Shcherbakov	Ambassador	9 September 1964	11 October 1974	
Boris Chaplin	Ambassador	11 October 1974	July 1976	

=== Soviet Union to South Vietnam (1973–1976) ===
Name	Title	Appointment	Termination	Notes
Aleksey Elizavetin	Ambassador	6 June 1973	27 December 1976	

=== Soviet Union to Vietnam (1976–1991) ===
Name	Title	Appointment	Termination	Notes
Boris Chaplin	Ambassador	July 1976	21 July 1986	
Dmitry Kachin	Ambassador	21 July 1986	1990	
Rashit Khamidulin	Ambassador	1990	25 December 1991	

=== Russian Federation to Vietnam (1991–present) ===
Name	Title	Appointment	Termination	Notes
Rashit Khamidulin	Ambassador	25 December 1991	25 June 1996	
Viktor Ivanov	Ambassador	25 June 1996	9 April 2001	
Andrey Tatarinov	Ambassador	9 April 2001	9 December 2004	
Vadim Serafimov	Ambassador	9 December 2004	30 July 2009	
Andrey Kovtun	Ambassador	30 July 2009	26 December 2014	
Konstantin Vnukov	Ambassador	26 December 2014	25 March 2021	
Gennady Bezdetko	Ambassador	25 March 2021		
