= Alexander Losyukov =

Russian diplomat (1943–2021)

Alexander Prokhorovich Losyukov (Russian: Александр Прохорович Лосюков; 15 November 1943 – 16 November 2021) was a Soviet and Russian diplomat.

== Biography ==
After graduating from the Moscow State Institute of International Relations in 1968, Losyukov entered the service of the Soviet Ministry of Foreign Affairs, working in various positions in the central office and in diplomatic missions abroad, including in Afghanistan, the United States and the Philippines.

From 1992 to 1994, Losyukov was Ambassador of Russia to New Zealand, with concurrent accreditation to Samoa and Tonga. From 1994 to 1997, Losyukov was Ambassador of Russia to Australia, with concurrent accreditation to Fiji, Nauru and Vanuatu.

In July 2001, as Deputy Minister of Foreign Affairs, he led the signature of the 2001 Sino-Russian Treaty of Friendship. On 19 September 2001, he met with PCR ambassador Zhang Deguang to discuss the aftermath of the September 11 attacks. In 2003, as soon as North Korea gave up the Treaty on the Non-Proliferation of Nuclear Weapons which led to the start of the North Korea nuclear crisis, Alexander Losyukov traveled to North Korea as soon as January 2003 with the mission to find a negotiation process between the communist country and the United States, considering Russia and the US as allies in the war against terrorism. He declared the talks with his North-Korean counterparts, and Kim Jong-il, as successful.

In March 2004, Losyukov was appointed Ambassador of Russia to Japan.

Losyukov spoke Russian, Pashto and English.
