= List of ambassadors of Russia to Azerbaijan =

Ambassador of the Russian Federation to the Republic of Azerbaijan
- Emblem of the Russian Foreign Ministry

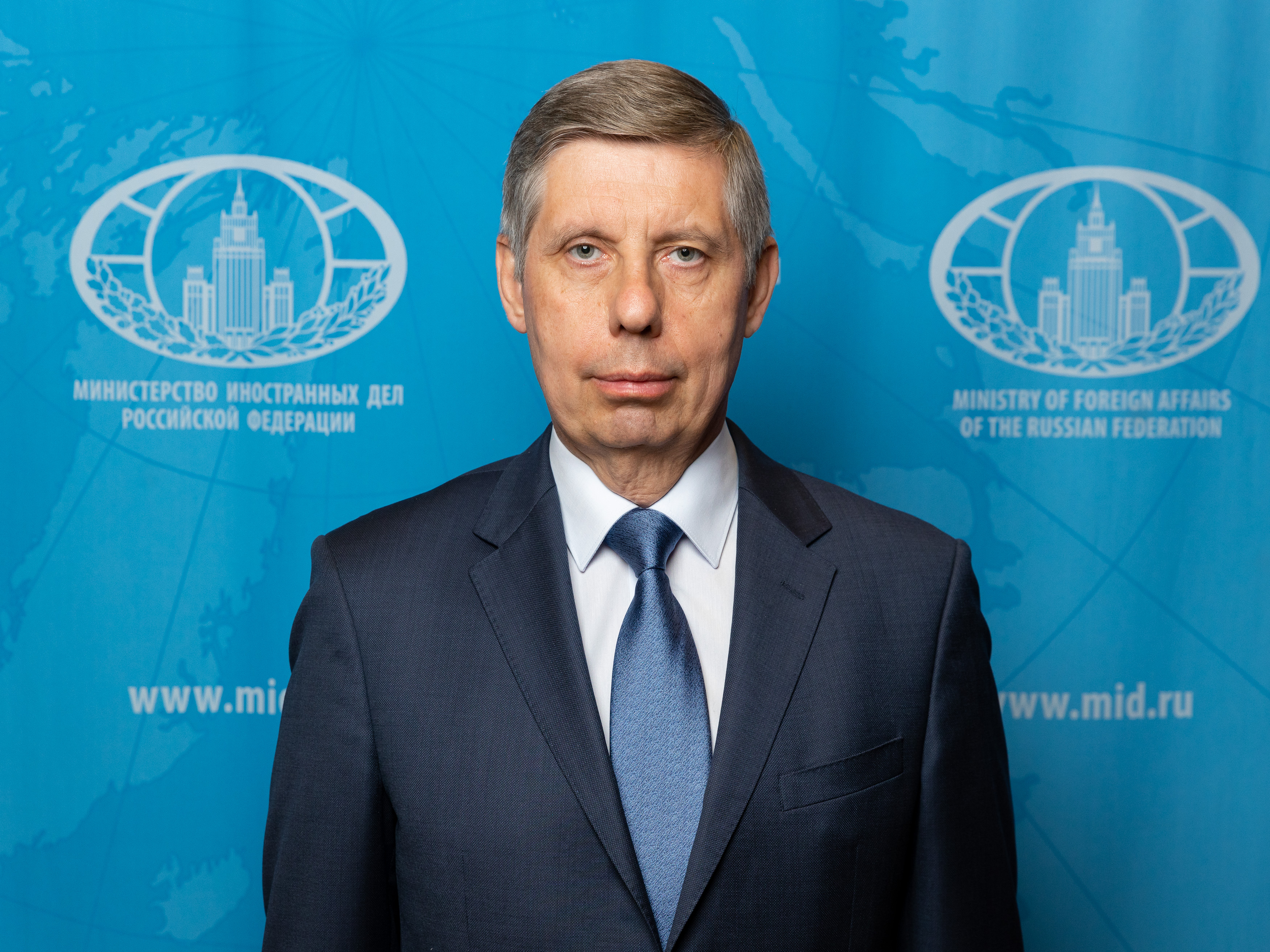
- Incumbent; Mikhail Yevdokimov since 14 June 2023
- Ministry of Foreign Affairs; Embassy of Russia in Baku
- Style: His Excellency; The Honourable
- Reports to: Minister of Foreign Affairs
- Seat: Baku
- Appointer: President of Russia
- Term length: At the pleasure of the president
- Formation: 1992
- First holder: Valter Shoniya
- Website: Embassy of Russia in Azerbaijan

The ambassador extraordinary and plenipotentiary of the Russian Federation to the Republic of Azerbaijan is the official representative of the president and the government of the Russian Federation to the president and the government of Azerbaijan.

The ambassador and his staff work at large in the Embassy of Russia in Baku. The post of Russian ambassador to Azerbaijan is currently held by Mikhail Yevdokimov, incumbent since 14 June 2023.

== List of representatives (1992–present) ==
Name	Title	Appointment	Termination	Notes
Valter Shoniya	Ambassador	2 March 1992	26 June 1995	
Alexander Blokhin	Ambassador	26 June 1995	6 January 2000	
Nikolai Ryabov	Ambassador	9 September 2000	19 October 2004	
Vasily Istratov	Ambassador	29 May 2006	24 February 2009	
Vladimir Dorokhin	Ambassador	24 February 2009	27 November 2017	
Oleg Murashev	Chargé d'affaires	27 November 2017	2018	
Mikhail Bocharnikov	Ambassador	29 May 2018	14 June 2023	
Mikhail Yevdokimov	Ambassador	14 June 2023		
