= List of ambassadors of Russia to Namibia =

Ambassador of the Russian Federation to the Republic of Namibia
- Emblem of the Russian Foreign Ministry
- Incumbent; Dmitry Lobach since 19 August 2022
- Ministry of Foreign Affairs; Embassy of Russia in Windhoek
- Style: His Excellency; The Honourable
- Reports to: Minister of Foreign Affairs
- Seat: Windhoek
- Appointer: President of Russia
- Term length: At the pleasure of the president
- Website: Embassy of Russia in Namibia

The ambassador of Russia to Namibia is the official representative of the president and the government of the Russian Federation to the president and the government of Namibia.

The ambassador and his staff work at large in the Russian embassy in Windhoek. The current Russian ambassador to Namibia is Dmitry Lobach, incumbent since 19 August 2022.

== History of diplomatic relations ==
Formal diplomatic relations between Namibia and the Soviet Union were established on 21 March 1990, the day it declared independence from South Africa. Andrey Urnov was appointed as the first ambassador on 15 August 1990. With the dissolution of the Soviet Union in 1991, Namibia recognised the Russian Federation as its successor state. The incumbent Soviet ambassador continued as ambassador from Russia until 1994.

== List of representatives of Russia to Namibia (1991 – present) ==
=== Soviet Union to Namibia (1990-1991) ===
Name	Title	Appointment	Termination	Notes
Andrey Urnov	Ambassador	15 August 1990	25 December 1991	

=== Russian Federation to Namibia (1991–present) ===
Name	Title	Appointment	Termination	Notes
Andrey Urnov	Ambassador	25 December 1991	5 July 1994	
Bakhtier Khakimov	Ambassador	5 July 1994	11 November 1998	
Vyacheslav Shumsky	Ambassador	11 November 1998	20 August 2003	
Nikolai Gribkov	Ambassador	20 August 2003	23 December 2009	
Aleksandr Khudin	Ambassador	23 December 2009	24 July 2017	
Valery Utkin	Ambassador	24 July 2017	19 August 2022	Credentials presented on 9 November 2017
Dmitry Lobach	Ambassador	19 August 2022		Credentials presented on 19 July 2023
