= List of ambassadors of Russia to Uganda =

Ambassador of the Russian Federation to the Republic of Uganda
- Emblem of the Russian Foreign Ministry

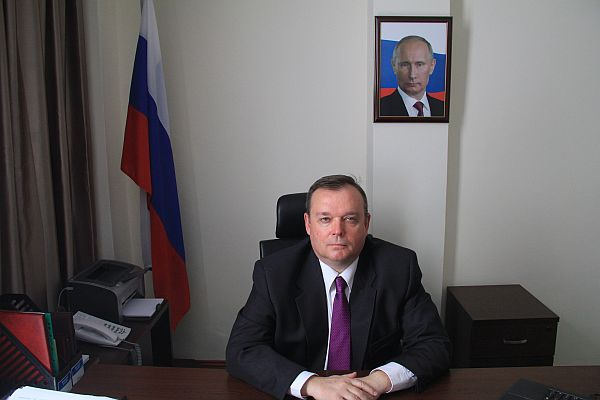
- Incumbent; Vladlen Semivolos since 1 September 2021
- Ministry of Foreign Affairs; Embassy of Russia in Kampala
- Style: His Excellency; The Honourable
- Reports to: Minister of Foreign Affairs
- Seat: Kampala
- Appointer: President of Russia
- Term length: At the pleasure of the president
- Website: Embassy of Russia in Uganda

The ambassador of Russia to Uganda is the official representative of the president and the government of the Russian Federation to the president and the government of Uganda.

The ambassador to Uganda and his staff work at large in the Russian embassy in Kampala. The current Russian ambassador to Uganda is Vladlen Semivolos, incumbent since 1 September 2021.

== History of diplomatic relations ==
Diplomatic relations between the Soviet Union and Uganda were established on 13 October 1962, shortly after its declaration of independence from the United Kingdom. Dmitry Safonov was appointed as ambassador on 25 June 1963. With the dissolution of the Soviet Union in 1991, Uganda recognised the Russian Federation as its successor state. The incumbent Soviet ambassador, Eduard Kuzmin, continued as ambassador from Russia until 1995.

Between 2013 and 2025, the ambassador to Uganda had dual accreditation as the non-resident ambassador to South Sudan, following the establishment of that country's independence from Sudan in 2011, and the opening of diplomatic relations on 22 August 2011. The arrangement came to an end with the appointment of Aleksandr Kosmodemyansky as the sole accredited ambassador to South Sudan on 11 September 2025.

== List of representatives of Russia to Uganda (1963–present) ==
=== Ambassadors of the Soviet Union to Uganda (1963–1991) ===
Name	Title	Appointment	Termination	Notes
Dmitry Safonov	Ambassador	25 June 1963	9 July 1968	Credentials presented on 19 July 1963
Ivan Kurdyukov	Ambassador	9 July 1968	29 March 1972	Credentials presented on 5 October 1968
Aleksey Zakharov	Ambassador	29 March 1972	16 November 1976	Credentials presented on 10 August 1976
Yevgeny Musiyko	Ambassador	16 November 1976	9 July 1979	Credentials presented on 14 December 1976
Sergey Bukin	Ambassador	9 July 1979	3 September 1986	Credentials presented on 16 August 1979
Stanislav Semenenko	Ambassador	3 September 1986	19 February 1991	
Eduard Kuzmin	Ambassador	19 February 1991	25 December 1991	

=== Ambassadors of the Russian Federation to Uganda (1991–present) ===
Name	Title	Appointment	Termination	Notes
Eduard Kuzmin	Ambassador	25 December 1991	28 February 1995	
Rudolf Alekseyev	Ambassador	28 February 1995	20 September 1999	
Aleksandr Sadovnikov	Ambassador	20 September 1999	6 February 2004	
Valery Utkin	Ambassador	6 February 2004	14 October 2008	
Sergey Shishkin	Ambassador	14 October 2008	29 January 2016	Died in post
Aleksandr Nuralov	Chargé d'affaires	29 January 2016	October 2016	
Alexander Polyakov	Ambassador	3 October 2016	1 September 2021	Credentials presented on 23 November 2016
Vladlen Semivolos	Ambassador	1 September 2021		Credentials presented on 6 December 2021
