= Rashit Khamidulin =

Soviet and Russian diplomat

- Рашит Хамидулин
- Born: 28 November 1936
- Died: 27 November 2013 (aged 76)
- Occupation: Diplomat
- Years active: 1960-2001

Rashit Luftulovich Khamidulin (Russian: Рашит Луфтулович Хамидулин; 28 November 1936 − 27 November 2013) was a Soviet and Russian diplomat.

After graduating from the Moscow State Institute of International Relations in 1960, Khamidulin entered the service of the Soviet Ministry of Foreign Affairs, working in various posts in the central offices and in diplomatic missions abroad.

From 1988 to 1990, Khamidulin was the Soviet Ambassador to Kampuchea, and from 1990 to 1996 the Soviet and Russian ambassador to Vietnam.

From 1996 to 1998, he was Director of the Third Asia Department at the Russian Ministry of Foreign Affairs.

On 31 August 1998, Khamidulin was appointed as Ambassador of Russia to Australia, with concurrent accreditation to Fiji, Nauru and Vanuatu, and held the post until 20 July 2001 when he retired.

Khamidulin spoke Russian, English, French and Vietnamese.

Khamidulin died on 27 November 2013, aged 76.
