= Vyacheslav Kovalenko =

Russian diplomat (born 1946)

- Вячеслав Коваленко
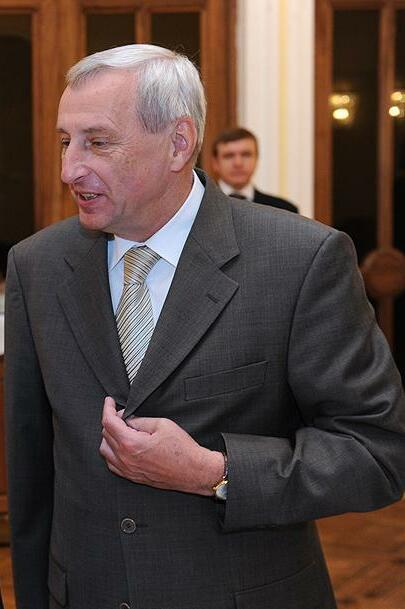
- Kovalenko in 2011

Ambassador of Russia to Armenia
- Minister: Sergey Lavrov
- Preceded by: Nikolai Pavlov
- Succeeded by: Ivan Volynkin

Ambassador of Russia to Georgia
- In office 7 July 2006 – 8 July 2009
- Preceded by: Vladimir Chikvishvili
- Succeeded by: Diplomatic relations severed on September 2, 2008

Personal details
- Born: 27 March 1946 (age 80) Moscow, Russian SFSR, Soviet Union
- Education: MSU Institute of Oriental Languages

Vyacheslav Yevgenevich Kovalenko (Russian: Вячеслав Евгеньевич Коваленко; born 27 March 1946) is a career diplomat and a former Ambassador Extraordinary and Plenipotentiary of the Russian Federation to Armenia. He served as ambassador to Georgia until the breakdown of diplomatic relations between Georgia and Russia in the wake of the August 2008 war.

Kovalenko graduated from the Institute of Oriental Languages at Moscow State University in 1972, and went on to work in various diplomatic posts in the central offices of the Ministry of Foreign Affairs and abroad.

In 2004, Kovalenko was appointed Director of the Second Department of Commonwealth of Independent States (CIS) countries at the Ministry of Foreign Affairs, and was appointed Ambassador of Russia to Georgia on 11 July 2006. On 29 August 2008, Georgia ordered all Russian diplomats to leave the country. Kovalenko left Tbilisi on 30 September with 22 Russian diplomats on a flight to Moscow.

Kovalenko speaks Russian, Arabic, Belarusian and French.

== September 2007 controversy ==
On 24 September 2007, the then Russian ambassador to Georgia, Vyacheslav Kovalenko, became embroiled in a controversy over his statement at a televised informal meeting with Georgian intellectuals organized by the Tbilisi-based Russian-Georgian Friendship Union in which he referred to the Georgian people as a "dying-out nation", and announced to the Georgians that they will soon become extinct in the face of globalization while Russia is "a large country, a huge country. It can digest this. You, the Georgians, will fail to digest this."

The statements sparked public outrage in Georgia, and Kovalenko was summoned by Georgia's Ministry of Foreign Affairs for explanations while the opposition factions in the Parliament of Georgia demanded the withdrawal of Kovalenko from Georgia. Georgian Parliamentary Chairperson, Nino Burjanadze, responded to the ambassador’s prediction: "Maybe, certain forces in Russia really want to see the extinction of Georgian nation, but this will not happen… I would advise Mr. Kovalenko to think about Russia and its demographic problems and we will ourselves take care of Georgian problems, including the demographic ones."
