= Andrey Rozhkov =

Russian diplomat

Andrey Nikolayevich Rozhkov (Russian: Андре́й Никола́евич Рожко́в; born 5 November 1944) is a Russian diplomat. He was the Ambassador Extraordinary and Plenipotentiary of the Russian Federation to Singapore between 2005 and 2011.

== Early life and family ==
Rozhkov graduated from the Moscow State Institute of International Relations of the Ministry of Foreign Affairs of the USSR in 1968 and joined the diplomatic service.

He speaks Chinese and English.

He is married and has two daughters.

== Career ==
Rozhkov started his career abroad in 1970 in the USSR Embassy in the Republic of Singapore. In 1977, he was posted to the USSR Embassy in the People's Republic of China. From 1986 to 1989, he served as counsellor of the USSR Embassy in Afghanistan.

From 1989 to 1997, Rozhkov served as deputy head of the Joint Government Delegation of Russia, Kazakhstan, Kyrgyzstan and Tajikistan at formal talks with the People's Republic of China on preparation of the Shanghai Agreement (1996) on Military Confidence Building Measures in the Border Areas as well as the Moscow Agreement (1997) on Mutual Reduction of Military Forces in the Border Areas.

In 1997, he returned to the People's Republic of China as Minister-Counsellor in the Embassy of the Russian Federation there. In 2001 he came back to Moscow to occupy the post of Deputy Director, First Asian Department, in the Russian Federation's Ministry of Foreign Affairs. During 1997 to 2000, he was also head of Russia's government delegation at formal talks with the People's Republic of China on preparation of a number of agreements related to trans-border bilateral cooperation (on Joint Economic Utilization of Frontier Islands, on Shipping Navigation in Boundary Waters, on Boundary Regime etc.).

In June 2005 he was appointed as Ambassador Extraordinary and Plenipotentiary of the Russian Federation in the Republic of Singapore. He holds Diplomatic Rank of Minister Extraordinary and Plenipotentiary of the First Class. He was recalled from his duties on 31 October 2011.

== Awards ==
Rozhkov has received the Order of Merit for the Fatherland (of 1st and 2nd Degrees) from his home country, as well as a number of Afghanistan state awards.
