= List of ambassadors of Russia to Cambodia =

Ambassador of the Russian Federation to the Kingdom of Cambodia
- ឯកអគ្គរដ្ឋទូតនៃសហព័ន្ធរុស្ស៊ីប្រចាំនៅព្រះរាជាណាចក្រកម្ពុជា Посол Российской Федерации в Королевстве Камбоджа
- Emblem of the Ministry of Foreign Affairs
- Incumbent; Anatoly Borovik since 4 May 2020
- Ministry of Foreign Affairs
- Style: His Excellency
- Seat: Phnom Penh
- Appointer: The president
- Term length: At the pleasure of the president
- Website: Embassy of Russia in Phnom Penh

The ambassador extraordinary and plenipotentiary of the Russian Federation to the Kingdom of Cambodia is the official representative of the president and the government of Russia to the king and the government of Cambodia.

The ambassador and his staff work at large in the Embassy of Russia in Phnom Penh. The post of Russian ambassador to Cambodia is currently held by Anatoly Borovik, incumbent since 4 May 2020.

== History of diplomatic relations ==
Until 1953 Cambodia was under the French rule, gaining independence from France on 9 November 1953. The Soviet Union and Cambodia established diplomatic relations on 13 May 1956. In October 1956 the Soviet Union appointed Aleksandr Anikin as its first representative to Cambodia. Anikin served until 1959.

In 1970 the Soviet Union recalled all its diplomats, including the ambassador, from Cambodia and diplomatic relations between the two countries were interrupted. They resumed in April 1979.

== List of representatives (1956–present) ==
=== Soviet Union to Cambodia (1956–1991) ===
Name	Title	Appointment	Termination	Leader of the Soviet Union/ President of Russia	Notes
Aleksandr Anikin	Ambassador	2 October 1956	6 May 1959	Nikita Khrushchev	
Aleksandr Abramov	Ambassador	6 May 1959	2 February 1962	Nikita Khrushchev	
Konstantin Krutikov	Ambassador	2 February 1962	26 April 1965	Nikita Khrushchev Leonid Brezhnev	
Anatoly Ratanov	Ambassador	26 April 1965	14 November 1967	Leonid Brezhnev	
Sergei Kudryavtsev	Ambassador	14 November 1967	15 July 1971	Leonid Brezhnev	
Diplomatic relations interrupted (1971 - 1979)
Oleg Bostorin	Ambassador	14 May 1979	28 January 1985	Leonid Brezhnev Yuri Andropov Konstantin Chernenko	
Yury Razdukhov	Ambassador	28 January 1985	21 April 1988	Mikhail Gorbachev	
Rashit Khamidulin	Ambassador	21 April 1988	8 August 1990	Mikhail Gorbachev	
Yury Myakotnyh	Ambassador	8 August 1990	25 December 1991	Mikhail Gorbachev Boris Yeltsin	

=== Russian Federation to Cambodia (1991–present) ===
Name	Title	Appointment	Termination	Leader of the Soviet Union/ President of Russia	Notes
Yury Myakotnyh	Ambassador	25 December 1991	23 August 1994	Boris Yeltsin	
Vadim Serafimov	Ambassador	23 August 1994	12 April 1999	Boris Yeltsin	
Viktor Samoilenko	Ambassador	12 April 1999	29 July 2004	Boris Yeltsin Vladimir Putin	
Valery Tereshchenko	Ambassador	29 July 2004	25 May 2009	Vladimir Putin Dmitry Medvedev	
Aleksandr Ignatov	Ambassador	25 May 2009	7 November 2013	Dmitry Medvedev Vladimir Putin	
Dmitry Tsvetkov	Ambassador	7 November 2013	4 May 2020	Vladimir Putin	
Anatoly Borovik	Ambassador	4 May 2020		Vladimir Putin	

== See also ==
- Foreign relations of Russia
- Foreign relations of Cambodia

== External ==
- (in English and Russian) Embassy of Russia to Cambodia
