= List of ambassadors of Russia to South Sudan =

Ambassador of the Russian Federation to the Republic of South Sudan
- Emblem of the Russian Foreign Ministry
- Incumbent; Aleksandr Kosmodemyansky since 11 September 2025
- Ministry of Foreign Affairs; Embassy of Russia in Juba
- Style: His Excellency; The Honourable
- Reports to: Minister of Foreign Affairs
- Seat: Juba
- Appointer: President of Russia
- Term length: At the pleasure of the president
- Website: Embassy of Russia in South Sudan

The ambassador of Russia to South Sudan is the official representative of the president and the government of the Russian Federation to the president and the government of South Sudan.

The ambassador to South Sudan and his staff work at large in the Russian embassy in Juba. The current Russian ambassador to South Sudan is Aleksandr Kosmodemyansky, incumbent since 11 September 2025.

== History of diplomatic relations ==
Diplomatic relations between Russia and South Sudan were established on 22 August 2011, shortly after its declaration of independence from Sudan. Between 2013 and 2025, the ambassador to Uganda had dual accreditation as the non-resident ambassador to South Sudan. The arrangement came to an end with the appointment of Aleksandr Kosmodemyansky as the sole accredited ambassador to South Sudan on 11 September 2025.

== List of representatives of Russia to South Sudan (2013–present) ==
Name	Title	Appointment	Termination	Notes
Sergey Shishkin	Ambassador	18 July 2013	29 January 2016	Concurrently ambassador to Uganda; Died in post
Alexander Polyakov	Ambassador	3 October 2016	1 September 2021	Concurrently ambassador to Uganda; Credentials presented on 13 March 2017
Vladlen Semivolos	Ambassador	4 October 2021	11 September 2025	Concurrently ambassador to Uganda; Credentials presented on 9 February 2022
Aleksandr Kosmodemyansky	Ambassador	11 September 2025		
