= List of ambassadors of Russia to Australia =

Chief of Russian diplomatic mission to Australia

Ambassador of the Russian Federation to the Commonwealth of Australia
- Emblem of the Russian Foreign Ministry
- Incumbent; Mikhail Petrakov since 21 August 2025
- Ministry of Foreign Affairs; Embassy of Russia in Canberra
- Style: His Excellency; The Honourable
- Reports to: Minister of Foreign Affairs
- Seat: Canberra
- Appointer: President of Russia
- Term length: At the pleasure of the president
- Website: Embassy of Russia in Australia

The ambassador extraordinary and plenipotentiary of the Russian Federation to the Commonwealth of Australia is the official representative of the president and the government of the Russian Federation to the prime minister and the government of Australia.

The ambassador and his staff work at large in the Embassy of Russia in Canberra. There is a consulate-general in Sydney. The ambassador of Russia to Australia is concurrently accredited to Fiji, Nauru, Tuvalu and Vanuatu.

The post of Russian ambassador to Australia is currently held by Mikhail Petrakov, incumbent since 21 August 2025.

== History of diplomatic relations ==
Contact between Australia and the Russian Empire began in the 1800s with the visit of the Neva to Sydney, then part of the British-administered Colony of New South Wales. Consular relations began in 1857. Diplomatic relations between the Soviet Union and the Commonwealth of Australia were formally established on 10 October 1942. The first envoy, Andrey Vlasov, was appointed on 13 October 1942. Representation was upgraded to the exchange of ambassadors after 1948. On 4 April 1954 the ambassador, Nikolai Generalov, was recalled to Moscow in the wake of the Petrov Affair. Diplomatic representation was thereafter suspended until 3 March 1959, when an agreement was made to exchange ambassadors. Ivan Kurdyukov was appointed on 23 June 1959, and presented his credentials on 10 August 1959. With the dissolution of the Soviet Union in 1991, the Soviet ambassador, Vyacheslav Dolgov, continued as representative of the Russian Federation until 1993.

== List of representatives (1942–present) ==
=== Soviet Union to the Commonwealth of Australia (1942–1991) ===
Name	Title	Appointment	Termination	Notes
Andrey Vlasov	Envoy	13 October 1942	7 December 1944	
Nikolai Lifanov	Envoy	7 December 1944	16 July 1953	Ambassador after 1948
Nikolai Generalov	Ambassador	16 July 1953	23 April 1954	
Ivan Kurdyukov	Ambassador	23 June 1959	6 February 1963	
Vitaly Loginov	Ambassador	6 February 1963	20 October 1966	
Nikolai Tarakanov	Ambassador	20 October 1966	24 June 1970	
Nikolai Mesyatsev	Ambassador	24 June 1970	14 July 1972	
Dmitry Musin	Ambassador	14 July 1972	14 January 1975	
Aleksandr Basov	Ambassador	14 January 1975	20 October 1979	
Nikolai Sudarikov	Ambassador	20 October 1979	24 April 1983	
Yevgeny Samoteykin	Ambassador	24 April 1983	28 August 1990	
Vyacheslav Dolgov	Ambassador	28 August 1990	25 December 1991	

=== Russian Federation to the Commonwealth of Australia (1991–present) ===
Name	Title	Appointment	Termination	Notes
Vyacheslav Dolgov	Ambassador	25 December 1991	11 November 1993	
Alexander Losyukov	Ambassador	11 November 1993	6 September 1997	
Rashit Khamidulin	Ambassador	31 August 1998	20 July 2001	
Leonid Moiseyev	Ambassador	20 July 2001	10 November 2005	
Alexander Blokhin	Ambassador	10 November 2005	29 June 2010	
Vladimir Morozov	Ambassador	29 June 2010	28 July 2016	
Grigory Logvinov	Ambassador	28 July 2016	3 April 2019	
Aleksey Pavlovsky	Ambassador	3 April 2019	18 April 2025	
Mikhail Petrakov	Ambassador	21 August 2025		

== See also ==
- List of ambassadors of Australia to Russia
- Embassy of Australia, Moscow
- Foreign relations of Australia
- Ambassadors of Russia
