= Valery Tereshchenko (diplomat) =

Russian diplomat

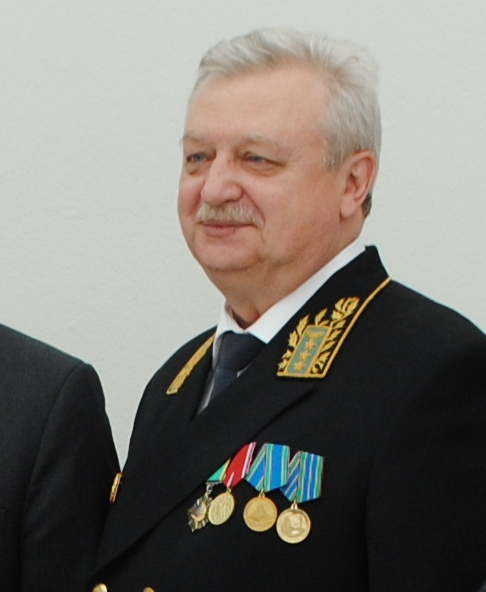

Ambassador of Russia to Cambodia
- In office 2004–2009

Personal details
- Born: 1952 (age 73–74)
- Education: Institute of Asian and African Countries

Valery Yakovlevich Tereshchenko (Russian: Валерий Яковлевич Терещенко; born 1952) is a Russian diplomat and is a former ambassador extraordinary and plenipotentiary of the Russian Federation to the Kingdom of Cambodia.

== Career ==
Tereshchenko graduated from the Institute of Asian and African Countries at Moscow State University in 1978, and entered the Soviet diplomatic service in 1980.

From 1980 to 1985, 1988–1992 and 1995-1999 he served at the Soviet, and then Russian embassy in Indonesia.

On 29 July 2004, Russian president Vladimir Putin signed Ukaz #982 confirming the appointment of Tereshchenko as Ambassador of Russia to Cambodia and held the post until 25 May 2009 when Dmitry Medvedev relieved Tereshchenko as ambassador.

Tereshchenko speaks Russian, English, Indonesian and Malay.
