= Andrey Tatarinov =

Russian diplomat

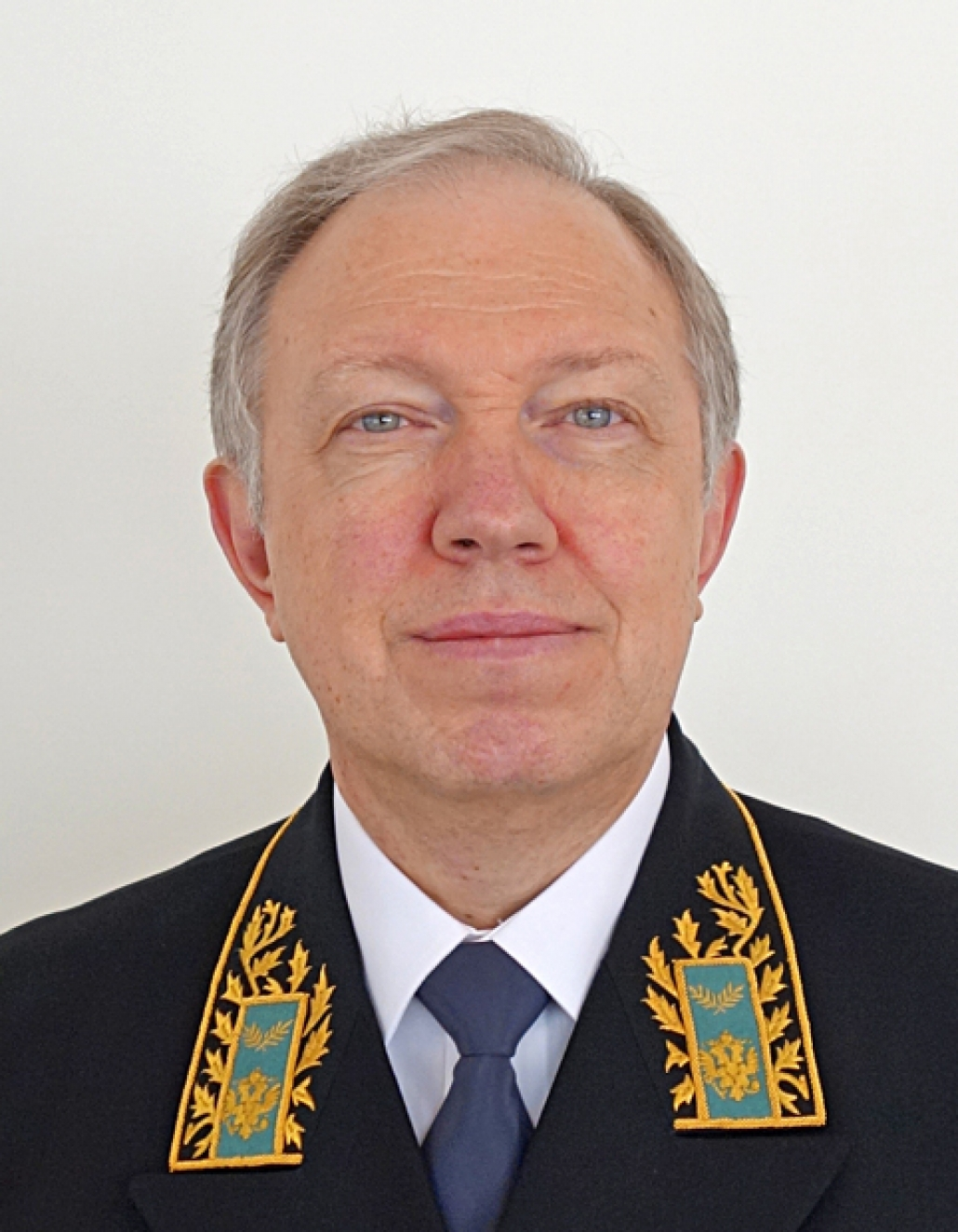
Tatarinov in 2015

Andrey Alexeyevich Tatarinov (Russian: Андре́й Алексе́евич Тата́ринов; born 1 January 1951) is a Russian career diplomat and ambassador who since 20 September 2003 holds the diplomatic rank Minister Extraordinary and Plenipotentiary of the First Class.

Tatarinov entered the Department of Vietnamese Linguistics at the Moscow State Institute of International Relations in 1968 and graduated in 1973, after which he entered the diplomatic corps of the Soviet Ministry of Foreign Affairs, serving in numerous posts abroad and in the central offices of the Ministry.

His first posting saw him taking up a position at the Soviet embassy in Vietnam, where he was posted from 1973 to 1977. He returned to Moscow and worked in the Department of Vietnam Affairs in the Soviet Foreign Ministry, until 1982 when he was again posted to Hanoi as First Secretary at the Soviet embassy, and stayed in Hanoi until 1988. In 1992, Tatarinov was appointed as Minister-Counsellor at the Russian embassy to Thailand, and held this position until 1997, when he was transferred back to Moscow and became Deputy-Director of the Personnel Department of the Russian Ministry of Foreign Affairs.

Tatarinov's first ambassadorial appointment came on 9 April 2001 when he was appointed by then-President of Russia Vladimir Putin as Russia's ambassador to Vietnam, a post he held from May 2001 until early 2004. On 8 March 2005, he was awarded the Medal of Friendship by the government of Vietnam in recognition of his contribution to Russia–Vietnam relations.

From January 2004 to December 2007, he was deputy director of the Department of ASEAN Member States and Common Asian Problems at the Foreign Affairs Ministry, and from 2004 he was also the Special Representative of the Minister of Foreign Affairs of Russia on ASEAN Member States and South Pacific Countries, a position he holds to the current day.

On 11 September 2008, President Dmitry Medvedev appointed Tatarinov as Ambassador of Russia to New Zealand, with concurrent accreditation to Samoa, and extended his accreditation to Tonga on 26 September 2008. He presented his credentials to Anand Satyanand, the Governor-General of New Zealand, on 12 November 2008, and to Tuiatua Tupua Tamasese Efi, the O le Ao o le Malo of Samoa on 5 February 2009. He was appointed ambassador to Singapore on 20 February 2015.

Tatarinov speaks Russian, English, French and Vietnamese.
