= List of ambassadors of Russia to Cape Verde =

Ambassador of the Russian Federation to the Republic of Cabo Verde
- Emblem of the Russian Foreign Ministry
- Incumbent; Yury Matery since 8 September 2022
- Ministry of Foreign Affairs; Embassy of Russia in Praia
- Style: His Excellency; The Honourable
- Reports to: Minister of Foreign Affairs
- Seat: Praia
- Appointer: President of Russia
- Term length: At the pleasure of the president
- Website: Embassy of Russia in Cape Verde

The ambassador of Russia to Cape Verde is the official representative of the president and the government of the Russian Federation to the president and the government of Cape Verde.

The ambassador to Cape Verde and his staff work at large in the Russian embassy in Praia. The current Russian ambassador to Cape Verde is Yury Matery, incumbent since 8 September 2022.

== History of diplomatic relations ==
Diplomatic relations between the Soviet Union and Cape Verde were established on 14 June 1975. Relations were initially handled through the Soviet embassy in Guinea-Bissau, with the Soviet ambassador to Guinea-Bissau, Vyacheslav Semyonov, having dual accreditation to Cape Verde from 19 December 1975. The embassy in Praia was opened in 1981, and the first ambassador solely accredited to Cape Verde, Nikolai Seryogin, was appointed on 23 November 1981. With the dissolution of the Soviet Union in 1991, Cape Verde recognised the Russian Federation as its successor state. The incumbent Soviet ambassador, Vladimir Stolyarov, continued as ambassador from Russia until 1997.

== List of representatives of Russia to Cape Verde (1975–present) ==
=== Ambassadors of the Soviet Union to Cape Verde (1975–1991) ===
Name	Title	Appointment	Termination	Notes
Vyacheslav Semyonov	Ambassador	19 December 1975	24 June 1980	Concurrently ambassador to Guinea-Bissau; Credentials presented on 24 December 1975
Lev Krylov	Ambassador	24 June 1980	23 November 1981	Concurrently ambassador to Guinea-Bissau; Credentials presented on 9 September 1980
Nikolai Seryogin	Ambassador	23 November 1981	18 March 1987	Credentials presented on 28 December 1981
Pavel Shmelkov	Ambassador	18 March 1987	21 March 1991	
Vladimir Stolyarov	Ambassador	21 March 1991	25 December 1991	

=== Ambassadors of the Russian Federation to Cape Verde (1991–present) ===
Name	Title	Appointment	Termination	Notes
Vladimir Stolyarov	Ambassador	25 December 1991	4 April 1997	
Vladimir Petukhov	Ambassador	4 April 1997	9 November 2000	
Yury Chepik	Ambassador	9 November 2000	28 September 2004	
Aleksandr Karpushin	Ambassador	28 September 2004	14 January 2011	Credentials presented on 23 November 2004
Boris Kurdyumov	Ambassador	14 January 2011	1 February 2018	Credentials presented on 18 February 2011
Aleksey Dubovitsky	Chargé d'affaires	December 2017	February 2018	
Vladimir Sokolenko	Ambassador	1 February 2018	13 October 2021	Credentials presented on 13 March 2018
Natalia Poklonskaya	Ambassador	13 October 2021	2 February 2022	Did not take up post
Timur Sabrekov	Chargé d'affaires	13 October 2021	8 September 2022	
Yury Matery	Ambassador	8 September 2022		
