= Natalia Poklonskaya =

Ukrainian-born Russian lawyer (born 1980)

Radveda Poklonskaya
- Радведа Поклонская
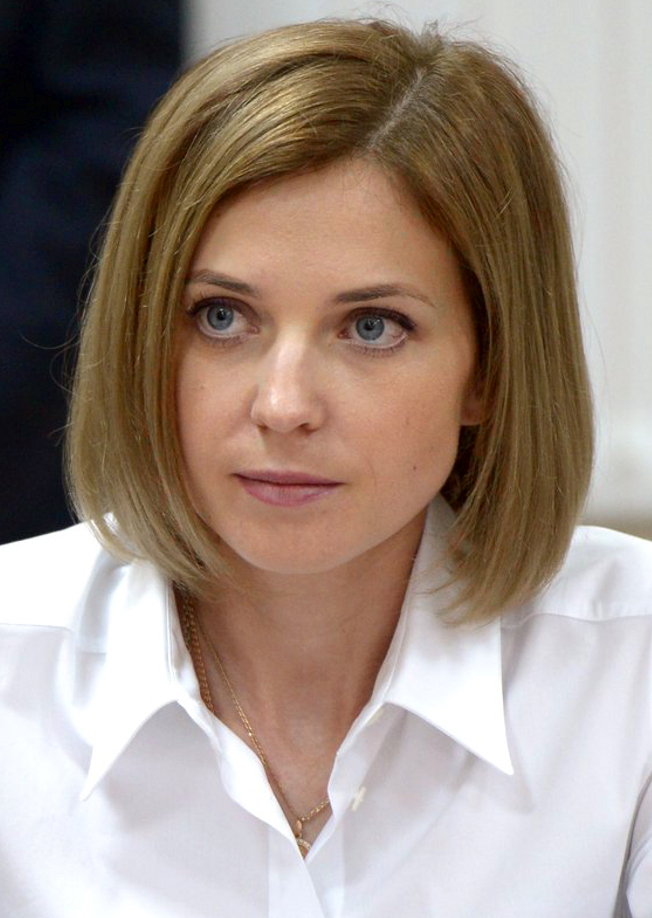
- Poklonskaya in 2015

Ambassador of Russia to Cape Verde
- In office 13 October 2021 – 2 February 2022
- President: Vladimir Putin
- Preceded by: Vladimir Sokolenko
- Succeeded by: Timur Sabrekov (acting); Yuri Materiy

Deputy of the State Duma
- In office 5 October 2016 – 12 October 2021

Prosecutor of the Republic of Crimea
- In office 25 March 2014 – 6 October 2016
- President: Vladimir Putin
- Preceded by: Position established
- Succeeded by: Andrei Fomin (acting); Oleg Kamshylov

Prosecutor of the Autonomous Republic of Crimea
- In office 11 March – 17 March 2014
- Preceded by: Vyacheslav Pavlov
- Succeeded by: Position abolished

Personal details
- Born: Natalia Vladimirovna Poklonskaya; 18 March 1980 (age 46) Mykhailivka, Voroshilovgrad Oblast, Ukrainian SSR, Soviet Union
- Citizenship: Soviet Union (until 1991); Ukraine (1991–2014); Russia (from 2014) (Note: From the point of view of Ukraine, Poklonskaya retained her Ukrainian citizenship because she did not follow the official procedures for loss of citizenship. From the point of view of Russia, she is not a Ukrainian citizen, since all Crimean residents who did not express in writing that they do not want to transfer to the Russian citizenship, automatically terminated their Ukrainian citizenship and obtained Russian citizenship.)
- Party: Independent
- Spouse: Ivan Soloviev (m. 2018; sep. 2019)
- Children: 1
- Education: National University of Internal Affairs; University of the Prosecutor's Office of the Russian Federation; Diplomatic Academy of the Ministry of Foreign Affairs of the Russian Federation
- Profession: Lawyer; politician; diplomat

Military service
- Allegiance: Ukraine (2002–2014); Russia (2014–present)
- Branch/service: Office of the Prosecutor General of Ukraine; Prosecutor's Office of the Russian Federation
- Rank: State Counselor of Justice 3rd Class

Natalia Vladimirovna Poklonskaya (Note: since 2025 known as Radveda Poklonskaya (Russian: Радведа Поклонская)) (Russian: Наталья Владимировна Поклонская; born 18 March 1980), is a Ukrainian-born Russian lawyer and civil servant, serving as advisor to the Prosecutor General of Russia since 14 June 2022.

She previously served as deputy director of Rossotrudnichestvo, Ambassador to Cape Verde, a deputy to the Seventh State Duma, and Prosecutor of the Republic of Crimea. She has also served Ukraine's civil service as a prosecutor from 2002 to March 2014, working in various Prosecutor's Offices or as an assistant district attorney. She has a Master's degree in International Relations, as well as the formal title of State Counselor of Justice, 3rd Class in the Russia's civil service system.

Poklonskaya became known as a prosecutor of organized crime cases: Alexei Yukhnenko, Andrei Laptev, the organized crime group Bashmaki, Seilem, Imdat, the case of the murder of Andrei Nechepurenko, an accident in Dnepropetrovsk, as well as other high-profile criminal cases while working in the office of the Prosecutor General of Ukraine.

Poklonskaya resigned as Prosecutor Republic of Crimea in 2016 after her election as a Deputy of the State Duma of Russia, where she served as deputy chairman of the State Duma Committee on Foreign Affairs.

Besides her law and diplomatic career, Poklonskaya is also known for her viral 2014 press conference as Prosecutor of the Republic of Crimea amid the Russian annexation of Crimea, which led to many fan-created anime-style moe images of her being created. In 2014, Poklonskaya was among the most searched-for celebrities on the internet in both Russia and Ukraine. She was the year's 7th most searched-for person in Russia and the 8th in Ukraine, and the 2nd most searched-for female in Ukraine and the 4th in Russia. She was described as a sex symbol. Poklonskaya responded in 2016 that she views her beauty as an asset.

== Biography ==
Natalia Poklonskaya was born 18 March 1980 in the village of Mikhailovka, in the Voroshilovgrad Oblast of what was and raised in a simple working-class family in Soviet Ukraine, and spent her early years in Crimea.

Later in 1990, her family moved to Yevpatoria in Crimea.

Her parents are ordinary people: her father worked both in the miner and on the collective farm, and her mother took care of the house. Natalia has repeatedly said that she was raised in her family with love for her homeland and a memory of the past.

Her parents are both retired, living in Crimea, and both her grandfathers died during the Second World War, with only her grandmother surviving the German occupation.

She chose the profession of law enforcement officer in memory of her uncle, who died at the hands of bandits.

She graduated from the University of Internal Affairs in Yevpatoria in 2002. In 2016, she completed professional training at the University of the Prosecutor's Office of the Russian Federation. In 2021, she defended her master's thesis at the Diplomatic Academy of the Ministry of Foreign Affairs of the Russian Federation.

Natalia started her career at the «Izuminka» cafe in Crimea, working as a bartender and waiter.

=== Work in the Prosecutor's Office of Ukraine ===
She worked in the Prosecutor's Office of Ukraine, having worked her way up from assistant district Prosecutor to senior prosecutor of the Department of the Prosecutor General's Office of Ukraine.

In 2002-2006 — she was an assistant prosecutor of the Krasnogvardeysky district of Crimea.

In 2006-2010 — she was an assistant prosecutor in Yevpatoria.

Between 2010 and 2011, she was the prosecutor, deputy chief department supervision of Prosecutor Office of the Autonomous Republic of Crimea.

In 2011 in Simferopol, she acted as the state prosecutor in the high-profile trial of Ruvim Aronov, a former deputy of the Supreme Council of Crimea and a former manager of the Saki soccer club. Aronov was prosecuted for his leadership role in the Bashmaki gang, an organized crime group that emerged in Crimea, Zaporizhzhia, Kharkiv, and Kyiv after the 1991 dissolution of the USSR. The gang had been "known for its cruelty" and had been implicated in racketeering, robberies, eight abductions, and 50 murders.

As a state prosecutor in the case of the Bashmaki gang, she was poisoned during a business trip to Odesa. Poklonskaya described the situation as follows:

"I drank a bottle of ordinary water at the hotel when I was on a business trip in Odesa. There was an unknown substance in the water. At the hotel, there was water on the nightstand, as usual. It happened at night - nausea, intestinal and stomach upset. A wild headache, my head was splitting to such an extent that I wanted to die."

Subsequently, the unidentified substance was removed from the body; after the poisoning, Poklonskaya filed a report, telling the manager that she would no longer be able to work on this matter.

She also acted as a state prosecutor for members of other organized criminal groups, such as Imdat, Seilem, the organized crime group of Alexei Yukhnenko, and the organized crime group of Andrei Laptev.

In particular, Poklonskaya conducted a criminal case into the murder of Andrei Nechepurenko, the victim worked in a large recreation and sports complex in the Pereyaslav-Khmelnitsky district of the Kiev region. In the summer of 2013, the media reported on the mysterious death of Nechepurenko, which occurred at the elite Senator Beach Club on the banks of the Dnieper River. With reference to the versions of the investigation, it was indicated that during a night walk on a boat, a young man in a state of alcoholic intoxication allegedly fell overboard and got under the screws. However, the reported that Nechepurenko could have been thrown overboard as a result of a conflict member in the UDAR party Artur Palatny and Ruslan Oleksenko, whom journalists call the ex-boxer's financial manager Klitschko. Poklonskaya was appointed the senior procedural head of the criminal proceedings.

In 2011-2012, she headed the Simferopol Interdistrict Environmental Prosecutor's Office.

From October to December 2012, she worked as the head of the Department for the participation of prosecutors in the consideration of cases by the Crimean Court of Appeal.

Later, from December 2012 up until March 2014, she worked as a senior prosecutor of the Prosecutor General's Office of Ukraine in the 2nd Department of procedural management of pre-trial investigation and Maintenance of the Department for Supervision of Law Enforcement by Internal Affairs Bodies of the 4nd Main Directorate for in Criminal Proceedings. By the time she joined the Prosecutor General's Office, she had the class Rank of Advisor, which corresponds to the rank of lieutenant colonel.

In 2013, Poklonskaya acted as a public prosecutor in a criminal case involving a traffic accident in the city of Dnepropetrovsk.

On 25 February 2014, Poklonskaya handed in her resignation from the post of Senior Prosecutor of the Department of the Prosecutor General's Office of Ukraine, but she was instead given a vacation and left Kyiv for Crimea where her parents lived. Poklonskaya was returned her official identification card of an employee of the Ukrainian prosecutor's office.

In March 2014, she completed her career in the Prosecutor's Office of Ukraine, went down in the history of the as a prosecutor investigating criminal cases and supporting state prosecution in courts against leaders and members of well-known organized criminal groups, as well as other high-profile criminal cases.

=== Prosecutor of Crimea ===
On 11 March 2014, she was appointed Prosecutor of the Autonomous Republic of Crimea during the early stages of the Crimean crisis, as the region moved toward annexation by Russia. Her press conference that went viral served as Poklonskaya's formal introduction in her new role after she broke with the Ukrainian government in Kyiv. During the session, she denounced the EuroMaidan Revolution, describing the change of government as an "anti-constitutional coup" and an armed takeover. She also stated that she did not propagate Nazism, unlike some functionaries in the new Ukrainian regime, and dismissed legal threats by asserting she was not afraid of the truth. Appearing in her uniform, she detailed specific provisions of the Ukrainian Constitution she believed authorities in Kyiv had violated.

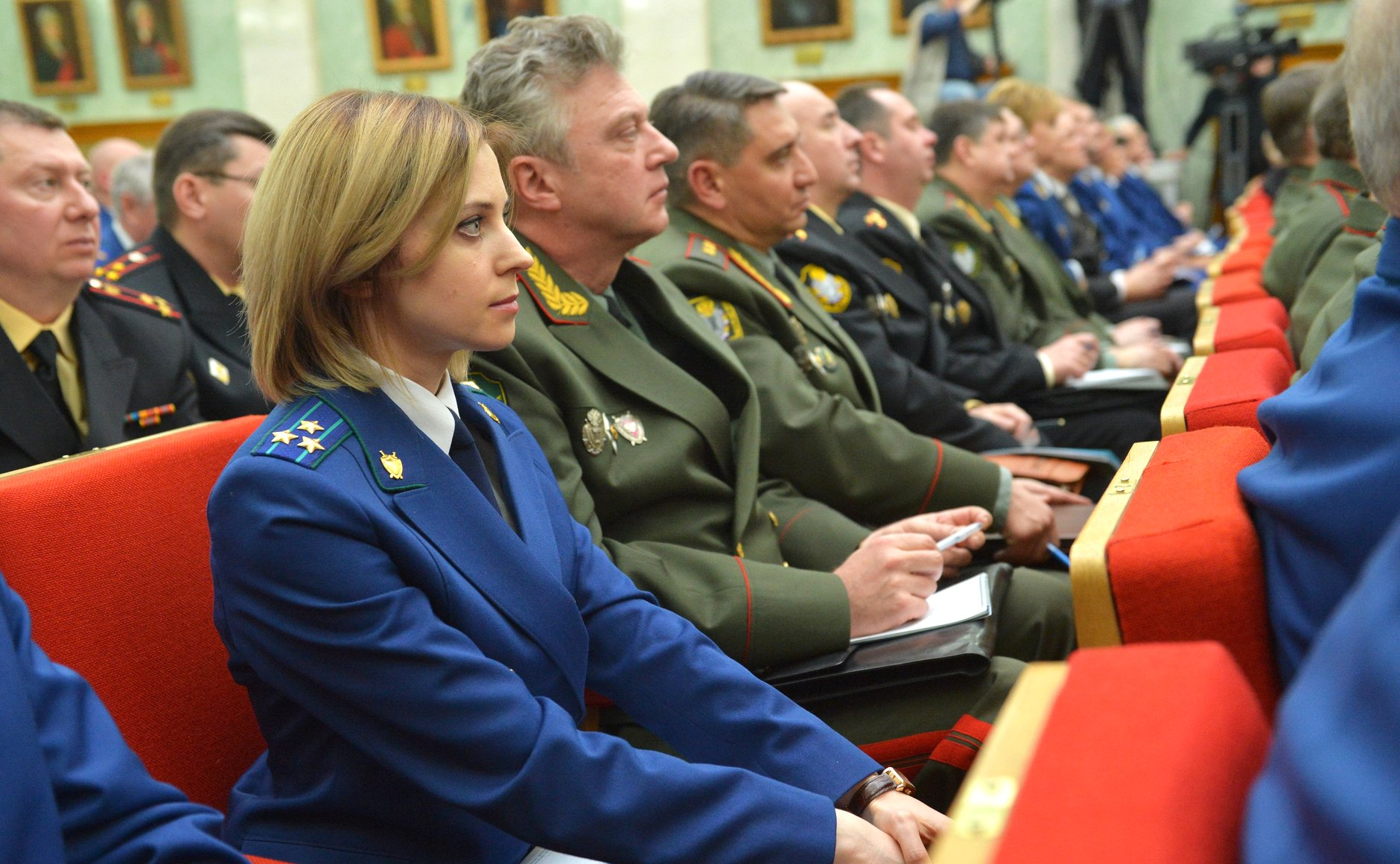
Prosecutor of Crimea Natalia Poklonskaya at the board of the Prosecutor General's Office of Russia, March 2015

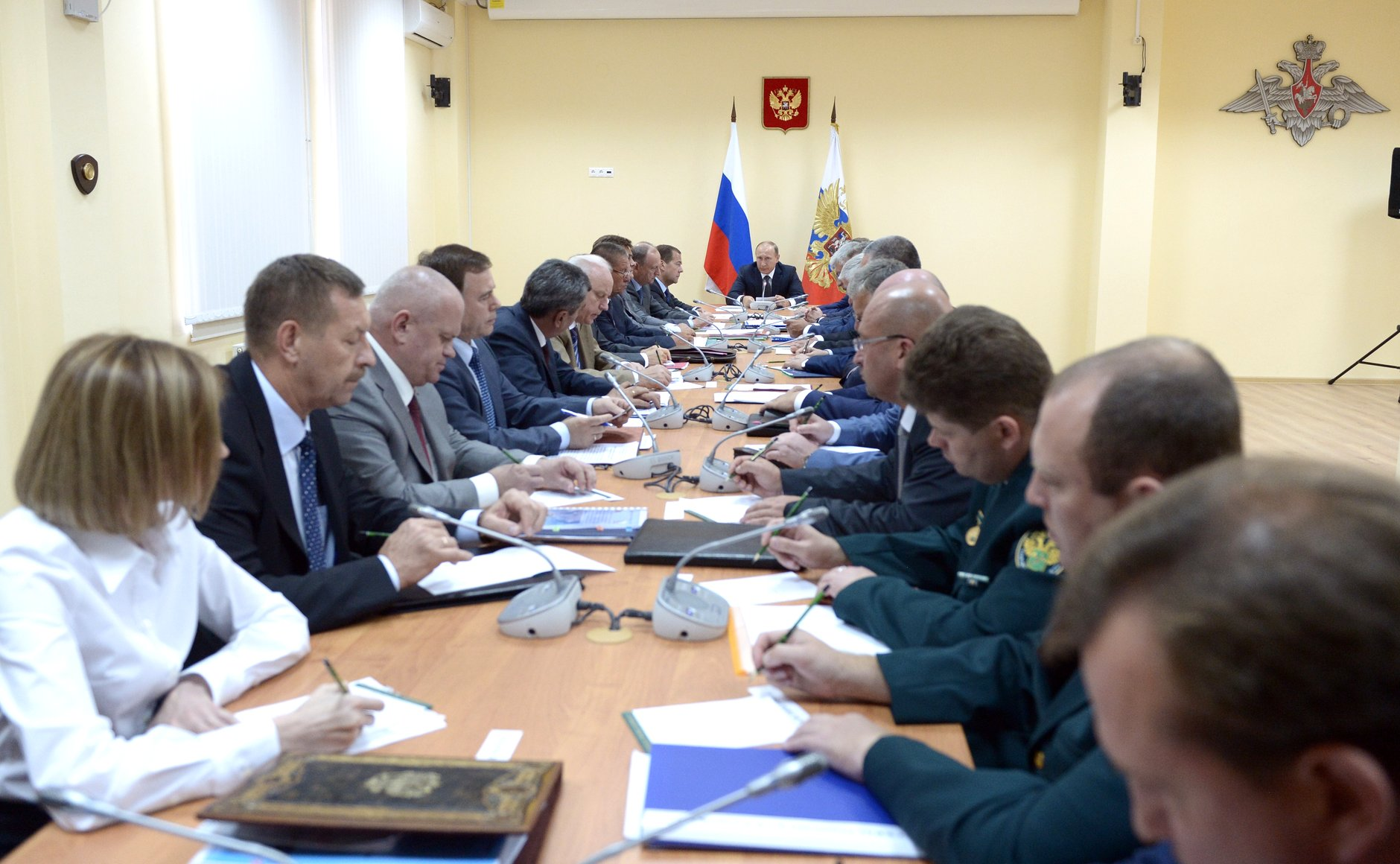
Prosecutor of Crimea Natalia Poklonskaya at a meeting, 2015

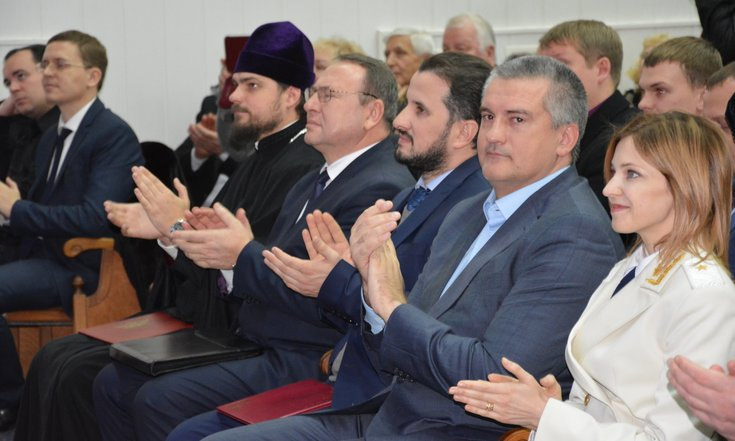
Poklonskaya with the head of Crimea Sergey Aksyonov at the event, 2016 year

On 25 March 2014, in connection with the formation of the Prosecutor's offices of the Republic of Crimea and the city of Sevastopol in the Russian Prosecutor's Office system, Poklonskaya was appointed Acting Prosecutor of the Republic of Crimea by order of the Prosecutor General of Russia Yuri Chaika.

On 27 March, she was awarded the class rank of Senior Adviser to Justice.

On 2 May 2014, Russian President Vladimir Putin signed a decree appointing Poklonskaya Prosecutor of the Republic of Crimea for a five-year term.

On 7 May, she took the oath of office of an employee of the Prosecutor's Office of the Russian Federation.

On 11 June 2015, Poklonskaya was awarded the class rank of State Adviser of Justice of the 3rd class.

In 2016, Poklonskaya completed professional training at the University of the Prosecutor's Office of the Russian Federation

On 26 September 2016, she sent an application to the Russian Prosecutor General's Office for her dismissal from the post of Prosecutor of the Republic of Crimea in connection with her election to the State Duma of the Russian Federation.

On 6 October 2016, Russian President Vladimir Putin dismissed Poklonskaya from the post of prosecutor of Crimea.

Prior to her resignation, she was the youngest female general in Russia, at age 36.

=== Deputy of the State Duma of the Russian Federation ===
On 27 June 2016, Poklonskaya took part in the second stage of the XV Congress of the United Russia political party in Moscow. By the decision of the Supreme and General Councils of the United Russia Party, at the suggestion of the chairman of the party, the Chairman of the Government of Russia Dmitry Medvedev — included in the election list of the United Russia party for the 2016 elections to the Russian State Duma.

On 22 August 2016, she officially became a candidate for deputy of the State Duma of the VII convocation.

External image
- Poklonskaya with Turkish President Recep Erdogan during a foreign visit

From 5 October 2016 to 12 October 2021 — Deputy The State Duma of the VII convocation on the list of the party "United Russia"; however, Poklonskaya is not a member of the party.

Member of the United Russia faction from 2016 to 2021.

On 24 September 2016, she participated in a joint meeting of the Supreme Council and the General Council of the United Russia political party.

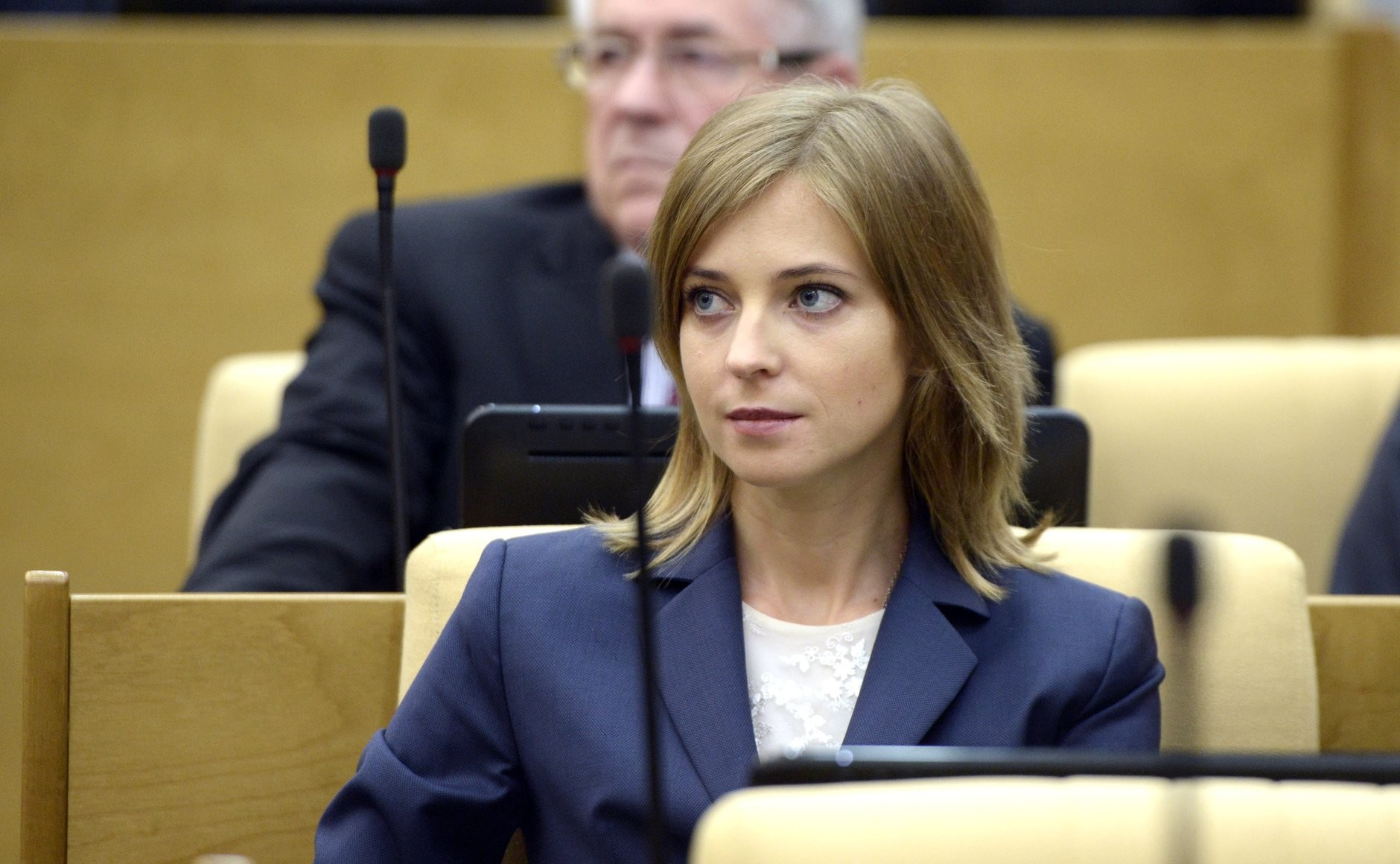
Poklonskaya at the first meeting of the State Duma of the VII convocation, 5 October 2016

On 25 September 2016, United Russia nominated her for the post of chairman of the State Duma Commission for the control of the authenticity of income declarations of deputies.

On 20 December 2016, she took part in an off-site meeting of the United Russia faction.

From 5 October 2016 to 10 September 2019 — Deputy Chairman of the State Duma Committee on Security and Anti-Corruption.

On 13 September 2018, she was deprived of the post of chairman of the State Duma commission for the control of the reliability of information on income, property and in connection with the merger with the Ethics Commission.

From 10 September 2019 to 12 October 2021 – Deputy Chairman of The State Duma Committee on International Affairs.

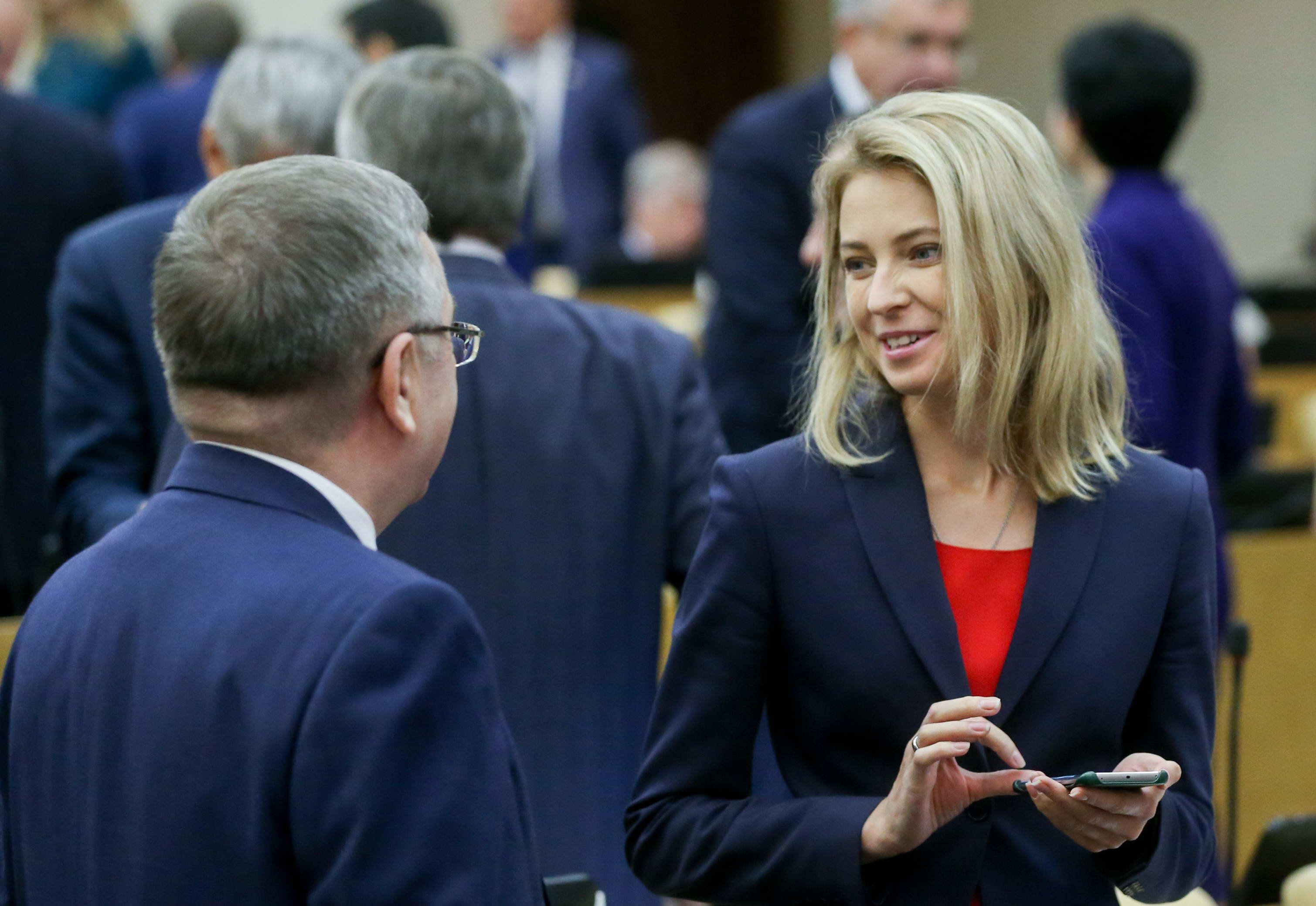
Poklonskaya at work in the State Duma

On 16 April 2021, she announced that, that she submitted documents to the Crimean regional organizing committee to participate in the preliminary voting of the United Russia Party.

On 28 May 2021, she withdrew her candidacy from the pre-voting, transfer to a new job, application form The parliamentarian was sent to the federal organizing committee of the United Russia party. According to the results of the primaries, almost 125,000 residents of Crimea supported Poklonskaya's candidacy, having become one of the leading candidates in the party primaries for participation in the elections of the State Duma of the Russian Federation in 2021.

On 17 June 2021, she took part in the last meeting of the State Duma The State Duma of the Federal Assembly of the Russian Federation of the VII convocation.

==== Legislative activity ====
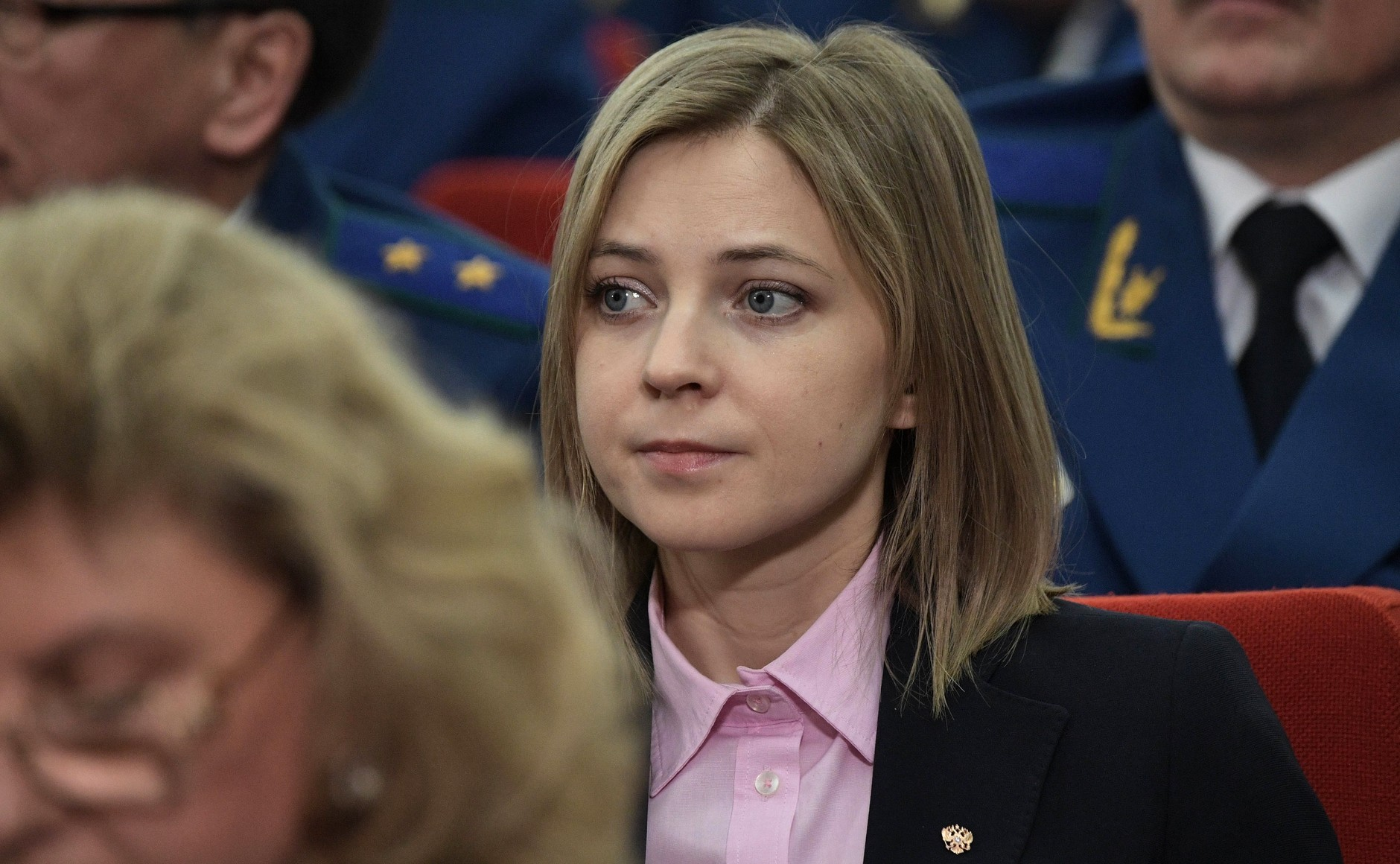
Poklonskaya in at a meeting of the State Duma Commission

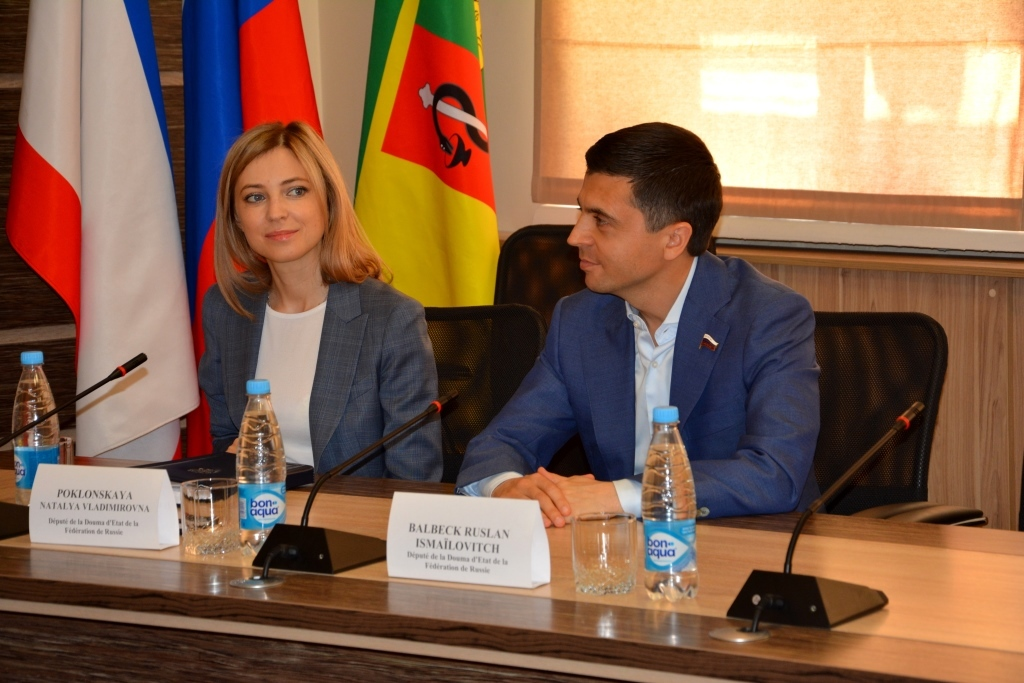
Poklonskaya and Deputy of the State Duma Ruslan Balbek at the signing of the agreement between Yevpatoria and Marignan, 14 May 2018

On 14 October 2016, she did not support the draft law "On Municipal Police in the Russian Federation".

In 2017, she developed a draft law on Russian citizenship on "law of the soil". The document received a positive opinion from the Duma Committee on Nationalities and was subsequently reviewed.

Poklonskaya, together with deputies of the State Duma, proposed a bill on responsibility for establishing conflicts of interest in the work of deputies of the State Duma and senators of the Federation Council of Russia. On 11 December 2018, the bill was passed by the lower house of parliament, and on 28 December it was signed by the President.

On 25 June 2018, she co-authored a draft law on the establishment of a memorable date in Russia.: 19 April is the Day when Crimea, Taman and Kuban were accepted into the Russian Empire (1783). The bill was adopted and published on 3 August 2018.

On 19 July 2018, Poklonskaya became the only member of the United Russia faction, who participated in first reading draft law Pension reform in Russia and those who voted against raising the retirement age despite the faction's decision on consolidated voting on this issue. On 29 August 2018, after an explanatory speech by Russian President Vladimir Putin on the pension bill, Poklonskaya proposed her author's amendments before the second reading, maintaining the old retirement age, but providing for increased payments at a later retirement.

External image
- Poklonskaya during a foreign visit to the Serbian Parliament

From 2016 to 2019, during her term as a deputy of the State Duma of the VII convocation, she co-authored more than 18 legislative initiatives and amendments to draft federal laws.

On 14 January 2020, she proposed to grant Russians the right to influence the revision or repeal of laws. According to the MP, if laws get in the way, they need to be reviewed or repealed. It would be possible to register such citizens' appeals on portal of Public Services.

On 4 January 2020, through her Telegram channel, she proposed renaming the draft law "On the Prevention of Domestic Violence in the Russian Federation" and calling it the Law on Strengthening and Preserving the Family, explaining that one should not "expose the family to a place of horror and constant beatings." In her opinion, serious changes should be made to the bill. On 30 January 2020, she did not support this law, proposing the following changes: changing the procedure for obtaining a protective order.

On 24 January 2020, she announced the development of a law on the responsibility of officials for insulting citizens. On 16 December 2020, the State Duma adopted in the third reading amendments on the administrative responsibility of officials for insulting citizens.

She also acted as the subject of the right of legislative initiative for a number of important bills.

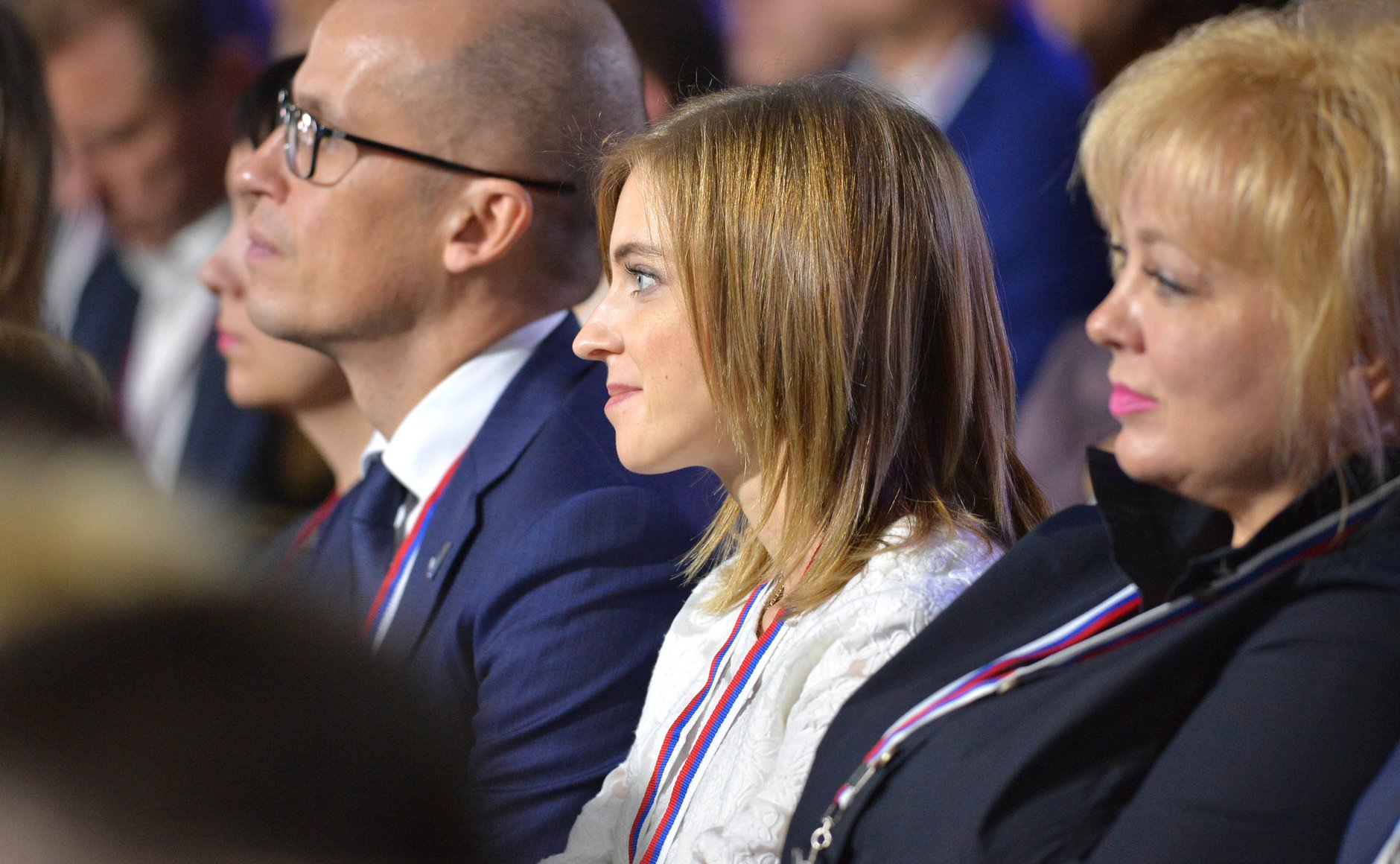
Poklonskaya in Yalta, 26 October 2016

On 24 November 2020, she initiated the removal of her name from among the authors of the draft law N1057895-7 "On Amendments to the Federal Law on Education in the Russian Federation".

On 26 January 2021, supported the draft Federal Law No. 1043391-7 "On Amendments to Chapters 23 and 25 of Part Two of the Tax Code of the Russian Federation".

On 27 January 2021, supported the draft Federal Law No. 1101332-7 "On Ratification of the Agreement on the Extension of Treaty between the Russian Federation and the United States of America on Measures for Further Reduction and Limitation of Strategic Offensive Arms dated April 8, 2010".

=== Russian Ambassador to Cape Verde ===
External image
- Poklonskaya in the uniform of a Russian diplomat

On 13 October 2021, by Decree of Russian President Vladimir Putin, she was appointed Ambassador Extraordinary and Plenipotentiary of the Russian Federation to Cape Verde.

On 19 January 2022, Poklonskaya announced the cancellation of plans for her assumption of the post of Ambassador of the Russian Federation to Cape Verde due to personal circumstances.

Two weeks later, on 2 February 2022, by Decree of the President of Russia, Natalia Poklonskaya was relieved of her duties as Ambassador Extraordinary and Plenipotentiary of Russia to the Republic of Cape Verde.

=== Deputy Head of Rossotrudnichestvo ===
2 February 2022 Decree of the President of the Russian Federation appointed assigned Deputy Head of Federal Agency for the Commonwealth of Independent States and Compatriots Living Abroad, and for international humanitarian cooperation Evgenia Primakova

On 7 February 2022, she announced that, as deputy head of Rossotrudnichestvo, she would be in charge of protecting the rights of compatriots and culture.

13 June 2022 Released by decree of President of the Russian Federation from the post of Deputy Head of Federal Agency for the Commonwealth of Independent States, Compatriots Living Abroad, and International Humanitarian Cooperation.

=== Advisor to the Prosecutor General of Russia ===
On 14 June 2022, she was appointed advisor to Prosecutor General of the Russian Federation. Upon taking this advisor role, she announced a complete withdrawal from social media and all public activity.

== Personal life ==
=== Internet attention ===
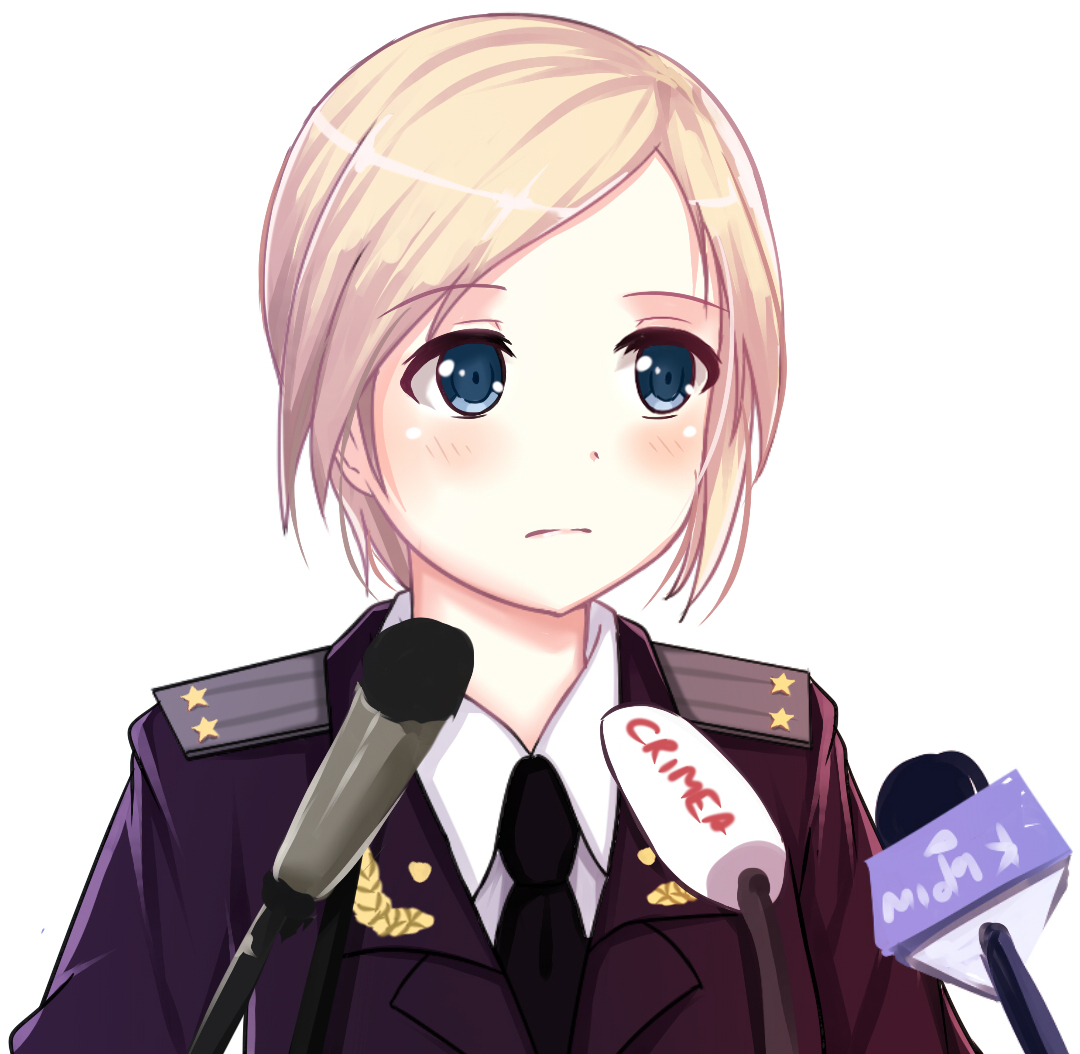
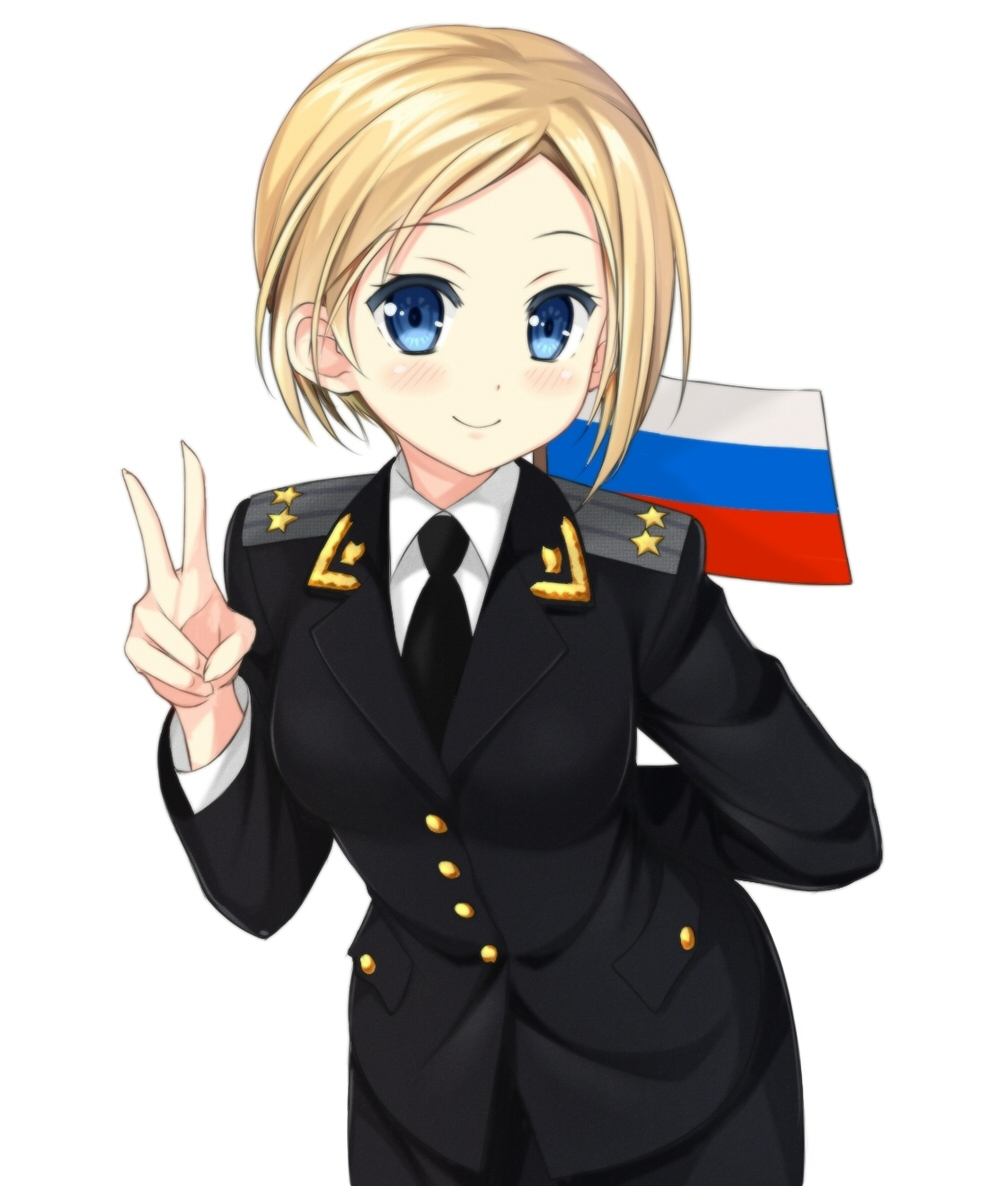
Samples of user-generated anime artwork depicting different impressions of Poklonskaya

After a video of Poklonskaya at a press conference on 11 March 2014 was uploaded to YouTube, she went viral among mainly Japanese and Chinese internet users, and also became the focus of attention of Internet communities such as Reddit, 4chan and VKontakte, which was reported by international news outlets. Within a month, the press conference was viewed over 1.7 million times. Many fan-created anime-style moe images of her uploaded to the Internet also attracted international media attention.

In 2014, Poklonskaya was among the most searched-for celebrities on the internet in both Russia and Ukraine. According to Google, she was the year's 7th most searched-for person in Russia and the 8th in Ukraine, and according to the Russian search engine Yandex – the 2nd most searched-for female in Ukraine and the 4th in Russia. She was described as a sex symbol by the New York Observer and Die Welt. Poklonskaya told the website Novorossia Today in March 2016 that she views her beauty as an asset: "My looks have never been an obstacle – I hope they deceive my enemies."

=== Family ===
Due to the international media coverage she received from 2014, Poklonskaya has been intentionally reticent about her personal life.

On 13 August 2018 Poklonskaya married 47-year-old Ivan Nikolaevich Soloviev, a veteran of law enforcement agencies, honoured lawyer of Russia, and head of the office of the Commissioner for Human Rights in Russia. The wedding took place in Crimea. A year later, in September 2019, Soloviev revealed that he and Poklonskaya had separated.

=== Views ===
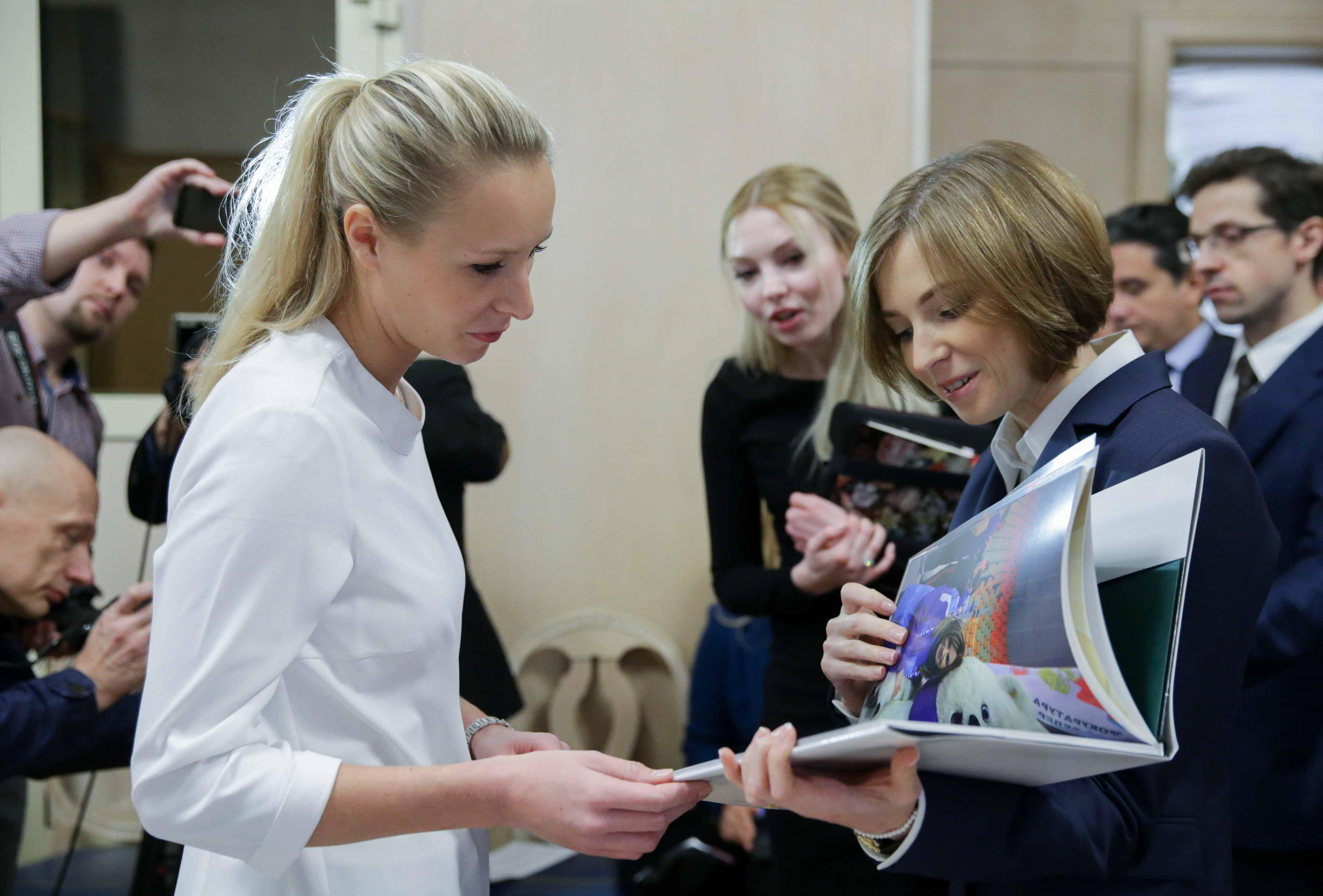
Poklonskaya at a meeting with members of the French Parliament in State Duma Russia

During the 2004 Ukrainian presidential election, Poklonskaya voted for successful candidate Viktor Yushchenko. On 15 September 2017, Poklonskaya announced that she had no plans to run for President of Russia.

Poklonskaya said that since March 2014 she has not been a citizen of Ukraine. In 2014, Poklonskaya declared that she considers Russia a great power. In April 2022 amid the Russian invasion of Ukraine and subsequent Russo-Ukrainian war, Poklonskaya referred to Russia and Ukraine as her "two native countries". It was reported in The Moscow Times that Poklonskaya had labelled the Ukraine war as a "catastrophe", also stating, "People are dying, houses and entire cities are destroyed [leaving] millions of refugees. Bodies and souls are mutilated. My heart is bursting with pain. My two native countries are killing each other, that's not what I wanted and it's not what I want." Poklonskaya's break with Russia's official line that the war is a "special military operation" to "de-Nazify and demilitarize" Ukraine was practically unheard of for a sitting official.

In March 2024, after the terrorist attack at Crocus City Hall, Poklonskaya advocated the return of the death penalty.

==== Religion ====
In March 2017, she claimed that a bronze bust of Tsar Nicholas II in Simferopol was seeping fragrant myrrh. The Russian Orthodox Church stated that they did not detect traces on the bronze bust, but instructed the church priest to continue observation; in the past some Roman Catholic worshippers had made claims of weeping statues of the Virgin Mary.

In February 2017, Poklonskaya led a campaign to block the release of the film Matilda portrayal of the affair between Tsar Nicholas II (who has been canonized by the Russian Orthodox Church) and the ballerina Matilda Kshesinskaya.

In 2024, journalist and TV and radio host Sergei Mardan, reported that Poklonskaya identifies as a pagan, having apostatized from the Orthodox faith. However, she denied it.

=== Other details ===
According to the declaration published on the website of the Prosecutor's Office of the Republic of Crimea, Poklonskaya has an apartment of 116.6 m^{2} in use, and her income for 2014 amounted to 1.926 million rubles. According to the declaration published by the Central Election Commission in 2016, Poklonskaya’s income for 2015 amounted to 2.3 million rubles. From 1 January to 31 December 2016, Poklonskaya’s income, according to the declaration published on the website of the State Duma of the Russian Federation, amounted to 2.6 million rubles; for 2017, income increased noticeably and amounted to more than 4.5 million rubles; for 2018, income amounted to 4,736,578.30 rubles. She also owns a land plot for individual housing construction of 1014 ±11 m².

Poklonskaya has frequently shared her affinity for dolphins, often citing her visits to dolphinariums as a primary way to manage stress. During her tenure in Crimea, she reportedly engaged in dolphin therapy at facilities such as the Yalta Dolphinarium, viewing the experience as a vital emotional reprieve from her high-pressure legal and political roles. Her personal interest in dolphins was widely documented through interviews and photographs showing her swimming with the animals.

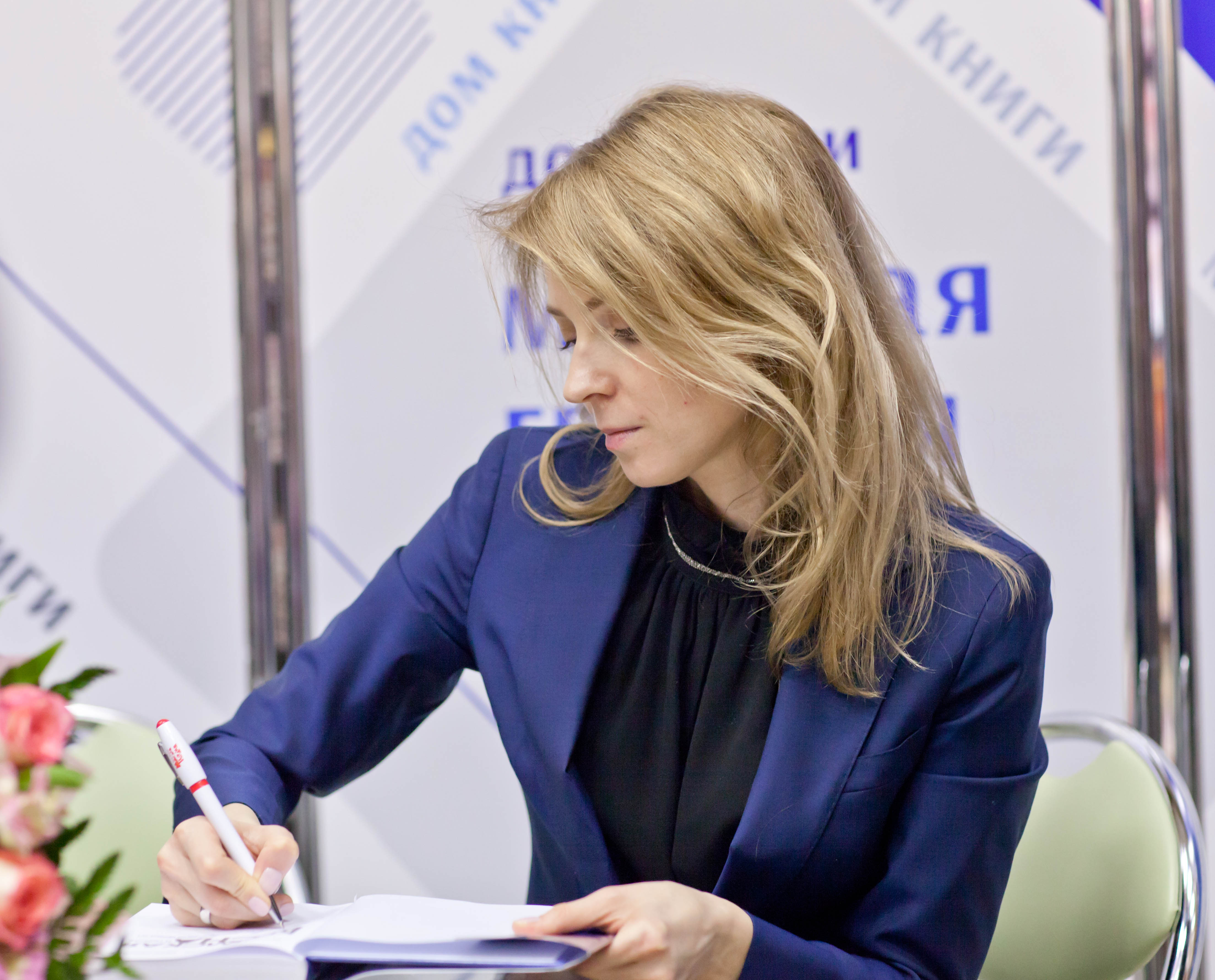
Poklonskaya in March 2019, signing one of her books

On 8 February 2018, the Book World publishing house published Poklonskaya’s book Devotion to Faith and Fatherland, dedicated to the events of 2013-2014. In February 2019, the Prospekt publishing house published Poklonskaya's second book Crimean Spring: Before and After.

Poklonskaya plays the piano. On her visit to the summer residence of Tsar Nicholas II, she played (among other pieces) Masquerade, a waltz by Soviet Armenian composer Aram Khachaturian.

==== Name change ====
Poklonskaya legally changed her name forename from Natalia to Radveda in 2025. In an April 2026 interview she denied that her name change was linked to her conversion to paganism.

==== Criminal case and sanctions ====
Following her appointment as Prosecutor General of Crimea on 11 March 2014, Poklonskaya was listed as a wanted criminal on the website of the Ukrainian Ministry of Internal Affairs, due to alleged involvement in conspiracy to overthrow constitutional order or seize state power. Poklonskaya's previous criticism of the opposition protests in Ukraine, and the "anti-constitutional coup" led the Ukrainian government to launch a criminal case against her and strip her of the civil service rank of Counsellor of Justice.

Poklonskaya was sanctioned by the United Kingdom on 5 May 2014 in relation to "actively implementing" Russia's annexation of Crimea. On 12 May, the European Union added Poklonskaya to its sanctions list. This barred her from entering EU countries and any of her assets there, if existent, were to be frozen. Canada imposed similar sanctions on Poklonskaya a month later, followed by Japan on 4 August. Australia followed soon after, sanctioning Poklonskaya on 2 September. On 19 December, the United States introduced its individual sanctions against several Ukrainian separatists and Russians, of which Poklonskaya was the only woman.

== Honours ==
- Order "For Loyalty to Duty" (13 March 2015, Crimea) — for courage, patriotism, active social and political activity, personal contribution to strengthening unity, development and prosperity of the Crimea.
- Order of Saint Anastasia (20 July 2014)
- Order of the Grand Duchess Elizabeth Feodorovna (19 May 2015)
- Order of the Holy Empress Alexandra Feodorovna (1 July 2015)

== Bibliography ==
- Poklonskaya N.V. Devotion to Faith and Fatherland . - M.: Book World, 2018. - 320 p. — ISBN 978-5-6040154-4-5
- Poklonskaya N.V., Solovyov I.N. Crimean spring: before and after. First hand story. - M .: Prospekt, 2019. - 208 p. — ISBN 978-5-392-29891-4
