= Yuri Korolev (ice hockey) =

Russian ice hockey coach, administrator and civil servant (1934–2026)

- Юрий Королёв
- Born: 6 June 1934; Moscow, Russian SFSR, Soviet Union
- Died: c. 1 March 2026 (aged 91)
- Occupations: Ice hockey administrator, educator, civil servant
- Known for: State Committee for Sports and Physical Education; All-Union Council on Physical Culture and Sports; Ice Hockey Federation of Russia; International Ice Hockey Federation
- Awards: Order of Friendship; Russian Hockey Hall of Fame; Paul Loicq Award

Yuri Vasilyevich Korolev (Russian: Юрий Васильевич Королёв; 6 June 1934 – c. 1 March 2026) was a Russian ice hockey administrator, coach and civil servant. He educated athletes and coaches while working for the State Committee for Sports and Physical Education and the All-Union Council on Physical Culture and Sports. He led the Soviet Union national ice hockey team research group for 28 years, when the Soviets won seventeen Ice Hockey World Championships and seven Winter Olympic Games gold medals. He was later an executive with the Ice Hockey Federation of Russia and the International Ice Hockey Federation. He was recognized with the Order of Friendship, induction into the Russian Hockey Hall of Fame, and the Paul Loicq Award.

== Early life ==
Korolev was born 6 June 1934, in Moscow, Soviet Union. He dreamed of being an ice hockey player but lacked the necessary skills. He chose to end his playing career by age 20 and transition to coaching.

== Career ==
Joining the State Committee for Sports and Physical Education in 1954, Korolev began a career of educating athletes and coaches. From 1962 to 1974, he lectured at the State Committee for Sports and Physical Education and became its senior lecturer. He served as the head of the hockey department at the State Committee for Sports and Physical Education from 1974 to 1983, and was the head teacher of its school of hockey coaches. From 1983 to 1989, he was the head coach of the football and ice hockey committee of the All-Union Council on Physical Culture and Sports, and was the deputy of the council from 1987 to 1988.

In international ice hockey, Korolev was connected to both the Soviet Union men's team and the Soviet Union men's junior team. From 1964 to 1992, he was head of the research group for the national men's team, and contributed to the team winning seventeen Ice Hockey World Championships and seven Winter Olympic Games gold medals. At the 1987 World Junior Championships, the Soviet juniors had a bench-clearing brawl versus the Canadian juniors, that later became known as the Punch-up in Piestany. Korolev expressed regret that the incident occurred but did not admit any guilt. He felt that the game should have been finished instead of both teams being disqualified from the tournament. During the 1990 Goodwill Games, Korolev spoke out against Sergei Fedorov leaving the Soviet national team and signing a five-year contract with the Detroit Red Wings. Korolev insisted that his player was stolen by premeditated actions and, rather than defecting on his own "under normal circumstances". He said that "having this happen on the eve of the goodwill games, is like a spoon of tar in a barrel of honey". At the end of his tenure, he was head coach of the national team from 1990 and 1992. He led the Soviet Union to a gold medal at the 1990 World Championships, and a bronze medal at the 1991 World Championships.

Korolev retired from coaching then served as vice-president of the Ice Hockey Federation of Russia from 1992 to 2001, and as its secretary general from 2001 to 2003. He also represented Russia at international meetings, and was elected to the International Ice Hockey Federation (IIHF) Council in 1992. He served six years as the chairman of its coaching committee until 1998. He served as a director of the hockey department at the International Scientific and Methodological Center from May 2003.

== Personal life and death ==
Korolev was a teacher and later colleague of Vyacheslav Koloskov at the All-Union Council on Physical Culture and Sports. Korolev was also close to Anatoly Tarasov, the latter of whom considered Korolev to be a scientific adviser.

Korolev's death was announced on 1 March 2026; he was 91.

== Honors ==
Korolev was made a recipient of the Order of Friendship by the Russian Federation on 20 December 1996. He was named an honorary life member of the IIHF in 1998. He was elected to the Russian and Soviet Hockey Hall of Fame in 2004. He received the Paul Loicq Award during the 2011 IIHF World Championship, for recognition of his contributions to the IIHF and international ice hockey.
