= Oleg Kamshylov =

Russian statesman and lawyer (b. 1969)

Oleg Kamshilov

Prosecutor of the Republic of Crimea
- Incumbent
- Assumed office 2 February 2017
- President: Vladimir Putin
- Preceded by: Natalia Poklonskaya; Andrei Fomin (Acting)
- Attorney General: Yuri Chaika; Igor Krasnov; Aleksandr Gutsan

Deputy prosecutor of the city of Moscow
- In office 24 November 2015 – 28 December 2016
- Moscow Prosecutor: Vladimir Churikov
- Preceded by: Alexander Kozlov
- Succeeded by: Oleg Manakov

Personal details
- Born: 1 January 1969 (age 57) Piketnoye, Omsk Oblast, Russian SFSR, Soviet Union
- Education: Omsk State University
- Profession: lawyer

Military service
- Branch/service: Prosecutor's Office of the Russian Federation
- Rank: State Counselor of Justice 2nd Class

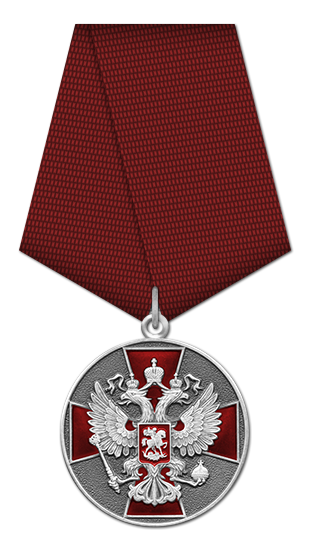
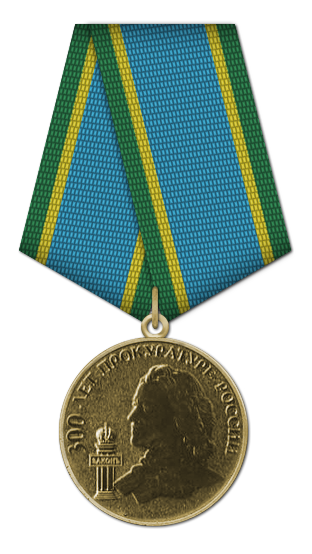
- Awards

Oleg Anatolyevich Kamshilov (Russian: Олег Анатольевич Камшилов; born 1 January 1969) is a Russian statesman and lawyer. He was appointed Prosecutor of the Republic of Crimea on 2 February 2017. State Counselor of Justice 2nd Class (2018).

Deputy prosecutor of the city of Moscow (from 24 November 2015 to 28 December 2016).

== Biography ==
Oleg Anatolyevich Kamshilov was born on January 1 in 1969 year in the village of Piketnoye, in Omsk Oblast.

1988-1989 — served in the Soviet Army.

1992 — Graduated from Omsk state University.

From 1992 – office as an assistant Prosecutor Marianovsky district of Omsk region.

1996-2000 — Prosecutor of the Cherlak district of Omsk region.

2000-2003 — Chief of Department on supervision of execution of laws by bodies of GNS, Federal Tax Police Service of the Russian Federation and FSB of the Prosecutor's office of Omsk region.

2003-2006 — First Deputy of City of Omsk Prosecutor.

2006-2015 — First Deputy Prosecutor of the Krasnoyarsk territory.

24 November 2015 – 28 December 2016 — First Deputy Prosecutor of Moscow.

From 2 February 2017 — Prosecutor Republic of Crimea.

=== The Prosecutor of Crimea ===
On December 27, 2016, Prosecutor General of the Russian Federation Yuri Chaika Chaika nominated Deputy Prosecutor of Moscow Oleg Kamshilov for the post of Prosecutor of Crimea.

On December 28, 2016, the Crimean State Council approved Oleg Kamshilov's candidacy for the position of Prosecutor of Crimea. The submission for the appointment of Oleg Kamshilov as Prosecutor of Crimea was read to the deputies of the State Council by deputy Prosecutor General of the Russian Federation Leonid Korzhinek. He described Kamshilov as a competent and operational leader who was repeatedly rewarded for his services.

During his speech in the Crimean parliament Oleg Kamshilov outlined the priorities of his work as the Prosecutor of Crimea: in the first place he put the protection of social rights of the inhabitants of the Crimea and in the second, the legality of the use of budgetary funds, as well as the maintenance of law and order.

On February 2, 2017 by presidential decree Russia's Vladimir Putin he was appointed Prosecutor of the Republic of Crimea, replacing Natalia Poklonskaya, who left the post of prosecutor of the peninsula in connection with her election to the State Duma of the Russia. At the moment, he has held this position for about 8 years.

On June 11, 2018 Oleg Kamshilov was awarded the rank of state Councilor of Justice, 2nd class.

On February 14, 2025, he spoke about the work of the Crimean Prosecutor's Office over the past year under his leadership. In 2024 alone, the republic's prosecutors identified more than 70,000 violations of the law, more than 11.5 thousand people were brought to administrative and disciplinary responsibility, hundreds of criminal cases were initiated based on audit materials, the supervisory authority of the peninsula. This is the detection by the prosecutor's office identification of violations of the law that hinder the development of economic and social spheres Republic of Crimea, pose a threat to public safety, the rights and freedoms of citizens, primarily socially vulnerable categories, for prosecutors the priority remains the protection of the rights of minors, attention is paid to the effective protection of the rights of entrepreneurs business Together with the Commissioner for the Protection of Entrepreneurs' Crimea rights, field meetings are being held with entrepreneurs to identify problems and find ways to solve them, prosecutor's office will continue work to protect the rights of citizens living in Crimea, as well as the interests of society and the state, over the past year the rights of more than 8,000 citizens were restored, including pensioners, disabled people, large families, violations of the labor rights of Crimeans have been identified, and the issue of providing medicines to residents of Crimea is under constant control of the prosecutor's office, anti-corruption efforts are underway in Crimea, and more than 900 officials have been disciplined in connection with the detection of violations of prohibitions, restrictions, and duties established in order to combat corruption by law. 68 of them committed violations related to the failure to resolve conflicts of interest in their official activities. According to measures, five persons were dismissed from their posts due to loss of trust.

== Awards ==
- Order of Merit for the Fatherland II degree
- Diploma of the Prosecutor General of the Russian Federation
- Rudenko Medal
- Medal «290 years of the Prosecutor's Office of Russia»
- Jubilee Medal «300 years of the Prosecutor's Office of Russia»
- Honorary Employee of the Prosecutor's Office of the Russian Federation
- Badge of the Prosecutor's Office of the Russian Federation «For Impeccable Service».
