= Andrei Fomin =

Russian lawyer and state prosecutor (1965–2023)

- Андрей Фомин

Prosecutor of Chuvashia
- In office 16 April 2020 – 1 July 2023
- President: Vladimir Putin
- Preceded by: Vasily Poslovsky
- Attorney General: Igor Krasnov

Acting prosecutor of the Republic of Crimea
- In office 3 August 2016 – 2 February 2017
- Preceded by: Natalia Poklonskaya
- Succeeded by: Oleg Kamshylov

First deputy prosecutor of the Republic of Crimea
- In office 8 August 2014 – 16 April 2020
- Regional Prosecutor: Natalia Poklonskaya; Oleg Kamshylov

Personal details
- Born: Andrei Valerievich Fomin; 4 August 1965 Kirzhach, Vladimir Oblast, Russian SFSR, USSR
- Died: 1 July 2023 (aged 57)
- Education: Yaroslavl State University
- Occupation: Lawyer; Prosecutor

Andrei Valerievich Fomin (Russian: Андрей Валерьевич Фомин; 4 August 1965 – 1 July 2023) was a Russian lawyer and state prosecutor. State Counselor of Justice 3rd Class.

He served as first deputy prosecutor of the Republic of Crimea Natalia Poklonskaya and Oleg Kamshilov from 2014 to 2020 year.

Acting prosecutor of the Republic of Crimea from 2016 to 2017 year, prosecutor of Chuvashia from 2020 to 2023.

Fomin died from drowning on 1 July 2023, at the age of 57.

== See also ==
- Suspicious Russia-related deaths since 2022
