= List of ambassadors of Russia to Guinea-Bissau =

Ambassador of the Russian Federation to the Republic of Guinea-Bissau
- Emblem of the Russian Foreign Ministry
- Incumbent; Aleksandr Yegorov since 9 March 2016
- Ministry of Foreign Affairs; Embassy of Russia in Bissau
- Style: His Excellency; The Honourable
- Reports to: Minister of Foreign Affairs
- Seat: Bissau
- Appointer: President of Russia
- Term length: At the pleasure of the president
- Website: Embassy of Russia in Guinea-Bissau

The ambassador of Russia to Guinea-Bissau is the official representative of the president and the government of the Russian Federation to the president and the government of Guinea-Bissau.

The ambassador to Guinea-Bissau and his staff work at large in the Russian embassy in Bissau. The current Russian ambassador to Guinea-Bissau is Aleksandr Yegorov, incumbent since 9 March 2016.

== History of diplomatic relations ==
Diplomatic relations between the Soviet Union and Guinea-Bissau were established on 6 October 1973, shortly after its declaration of independence from Portugal. Relations were initially handled through the Soviet embassy in Guinea, with the Soviet ambassador to Guinea, Leonid Musatov, having dual accreditation to Guinea-Bissau from 25 April 1974. The embassy in Bissau was opened in 1975, and the first ambassador solely accredited to Guinea-Bissau, Vyacheslav Semyonov, was appointed on 11 February 1975. With the dissolution of the Soviet Union in 1991, Guinea-Bissau recognised the Russian Federation as its successor state on 31 December 1991. The incumbent Soviet ambassador, Viktor Zelenov, continued as ambassador from Russia until 1996. Russian citizens and embassy staff were evacuated from Guinea-Bissau in 1998 due to fighting between government and rebel forces during the Guinea-Bissau Civil War. The embassy resumed operating in February 2001.

== List of representatives of Russia to Guinea-Bissau (1975–present) ==
=== Ambassadors of the Soviet Union to Guinea-Bissau (1975–1991) ===
Name	Title	Appointment	Termination	Notes
Leonid Musatov	Ambassador	25 April 1974	11 February 1975	Concurrently ambassador to Guinea; Credentials presented on 10 May 1974
Vyacheslav Semyonov	Ambassador	11 February 1975	24 June 1980	Credentials presented on 7 April 1975
Lev Krylov	Ambassador	24 June 1980	19 August 1986	Credentials presented on 21 August 1980
Vladimir Aldoshin	Ambassador	19 August 1986	14 August 1990	
Aleksandr Baryshev	Ambassador	14 August 1990	18 October 1991	
Viktor Zelenov	Ambassador	18 October 1991	25 December 1991	

=== Ambassadors of the Russian Federation to Guinea-Bissau (1991–present) ===
Name	Title	Appointment	Termination	Notes
Viktor Zelenov	Ambassador	25 December 1991	1996	
Yury Chigvintsev	Ambassador	14 March 1997	28 June 1999	
Vladimir Petukhov	Ambassador	9 June 2003	1 December 2008	
Mikhail Valinsky	Ambassador	1 December 2008	9 March 2016	
Aleksandr Yegorov	Ambassador	9 March 2016		Credentials presented on 21 April 2016
