= Civil Service of the Russian Federation =

The Civil Service of the Russian Federation (Russian: Государственная гражданская служба Российской Федерации) involves professional service activities of citizens of the Russian Federation for the enforcement power of the State. Alongside the military services, it forms part of the State Service of the Russian Federation.

== Federal Law "On the State Civil Service of the Russian Federation" ==
Signed by the President of Russia in 2004.

=== Chapter 3. Legal Status civil servants ===
In connection with the passage of the civil service civil servant shall not allow public statements, judgments and estimates, including in the media, in relation to the activities of government agencies and their leaders, including the decisions of higher state body or public authority, which replaces the position of a civil servant civil service if it is not part of his official duties.

=== Chapter 4. Joining the civil service ===
Receipt of a citizen in the civil service for a post-civil service or replacement of other civil servants civil service positions is carried out on the results of the competition unless otherwise stipulated by this article. The contest is to assess the professional level candidates for the position of the civil service, their compliance with the qualification requirements for civil service positions.

The competition jury consists of representatives of the employer, the representative of the management body of public service, as well as representatives of the scientific and educational institutions, and other organizations invited by the management body of public service at the request of the employer representative as independent experts - experts on issues related to civil service without specifying personal data experts. The number of independent experts should be not less than one-quarter of the total number of members of the competition committee.
