= 2024 Samara Oblast gubernatorial election =

Election

- 6–8 September 2024
- Turnout: 54.82%
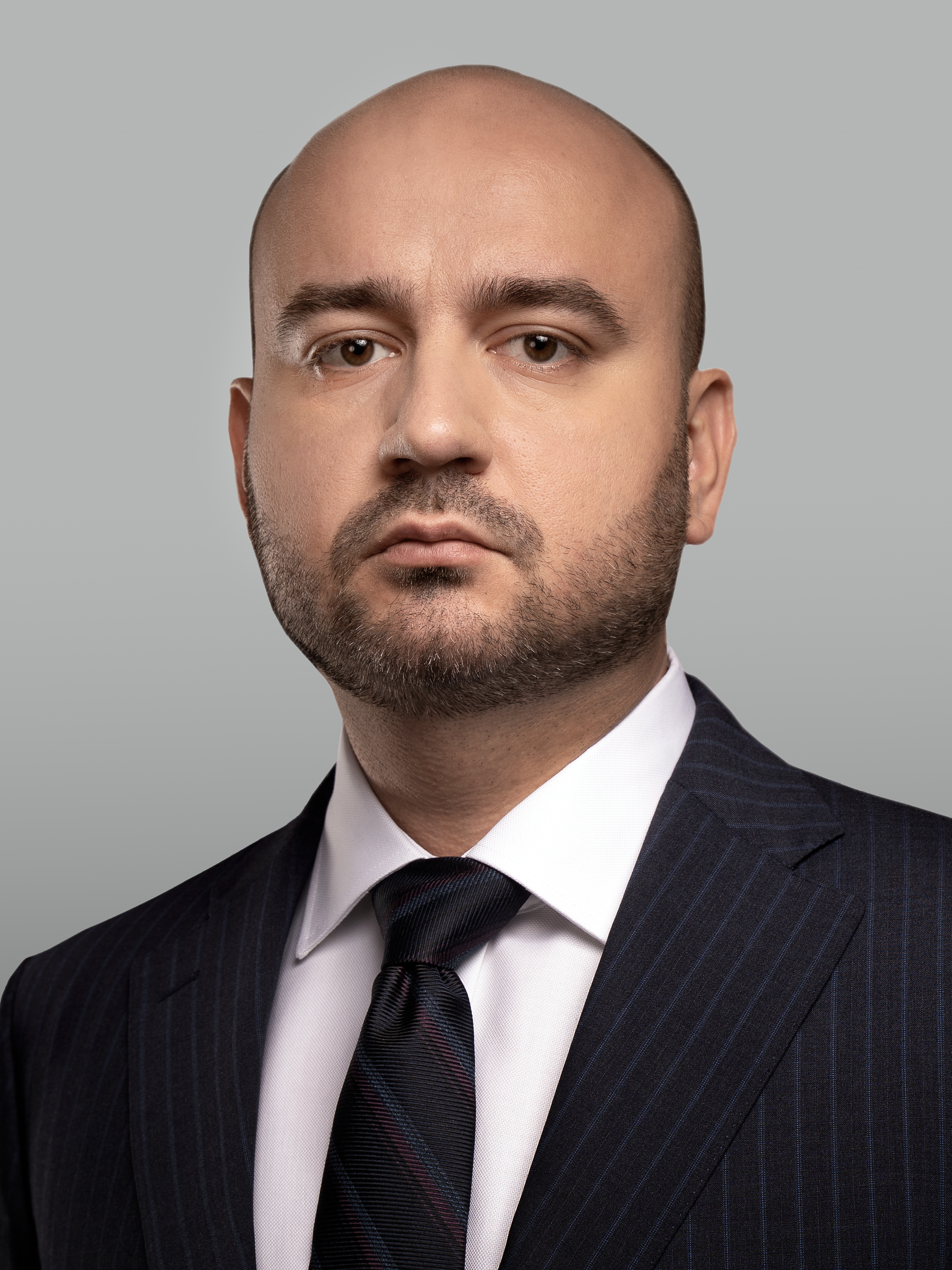

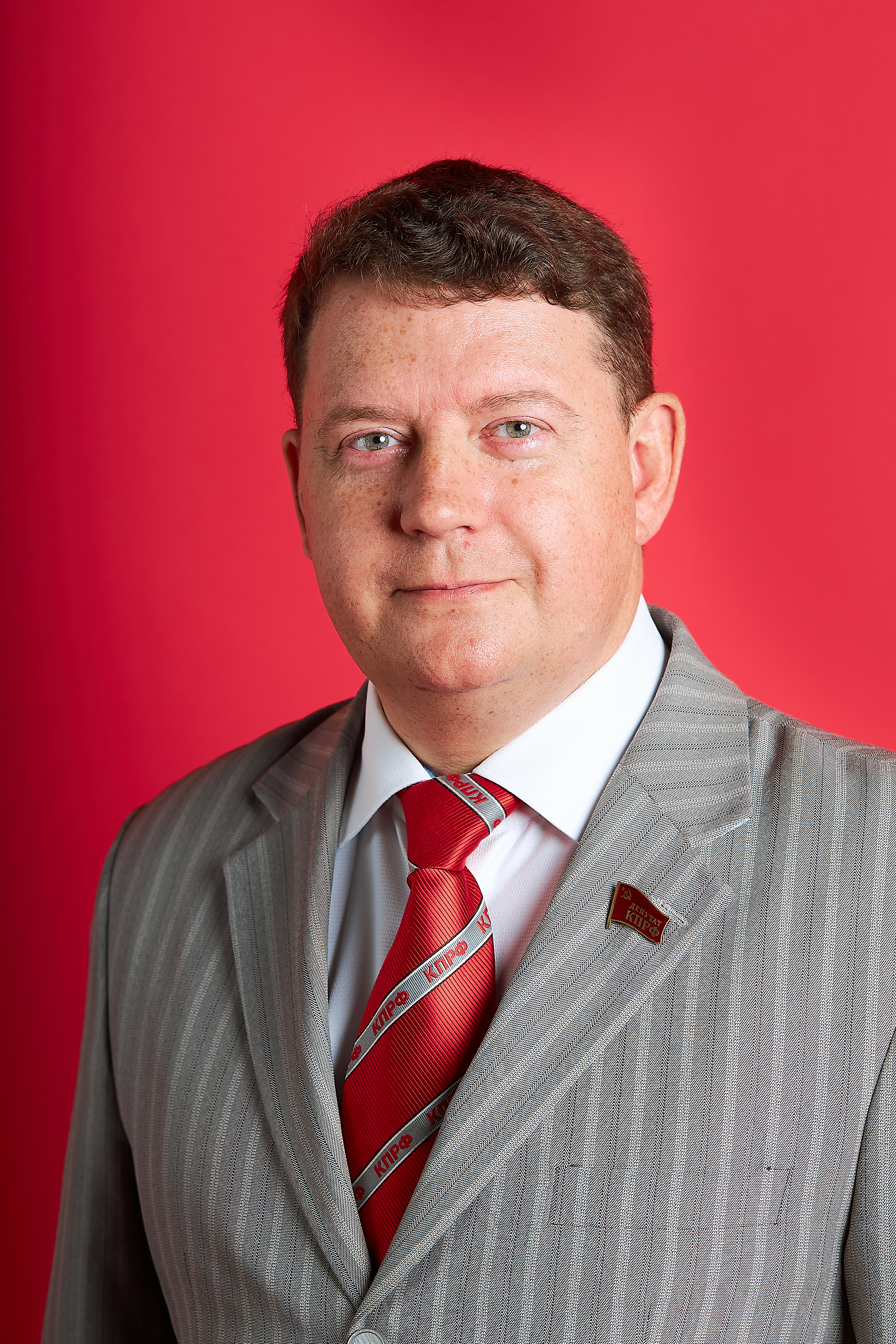
			LDPR
Candidate	Vyacheslav Fedorishchev	Aleksey Leskin	Natalya Bisyarina
Party	United Russia	CPRF	LDPR
Popular vote	1,045,504	91,077	78,557
Percentage	79.56%	6.93%	5.98%
- Election results by district: Vyacheslav Fedorishchev
Governor before election
Vyacheslav Fedorishchev (acting)
United Russia
Governor-elect
Vyacheslav Fedorishchev
United Russia

The 2024 Samara Oblast gubernatorial election took place on 6–8 September 2024, on common election day. Acting Governor Vyacheslav Fedorishchev was elected for a full term in office.

== Background ==
Dmitry Azarov was appointed acting Governor of Samara Oblast in September 2017, replacing Governor Nikolay Merkushkin. Azarov overwhelmingly won the 2018 gubernatorial election in his own right with 72.63% of the vote over a field of 5 opponents. Governor Azarov overwhelmingly won re-election in 2023 with 83.82% of the vote.

Despite easily winning re-election Governor Azarov immediately got into public conflict with Aleksandr Khinshtein, State Duma member from the region and former investigative journalist, which resulted in Khinshtein attacking Azarov and his administration. Throughout the year several current and former government officials in Samara Oblast were caught under the criminal proceedings, including chairman of the Government of Samara Oblast Viktor Kudryashov, minister of construction Mikhail Aseyev, former minister of construction Nikolay Plaksin, head of regional emergency services office Oleg Boyko, director of the department of external relations Vera Shcherbachyova, head of the accounts chamber Yelena Dubrova, advisor to governor Olga Mikheyeva, and former chairman of the court of cassation Aleksandr Yefanov.

In May 2024 rumours appeared about Azarov's potential resignation, eventually, on May 31, 2024, Dmitry Azarov announced his resignation less than a year into his second term. Later that day President of Russia Vladimir Putin met with Chairman of the Government of Tula Oblast Vyacheslav Fedorishchev and asked him to become acting Governor of Samara Oblast, which Fedorishchev agreed to.

== Candidates ==
In Samara Oblast candidates for Governor can be nominated only by registered political parties. Candidate for Governor of Samara Oblast should be a Russian citizen and at least 30 years old. Candidates for Governor should not have a foreign citizenship or residence permit. Each candidate in order to be registered is required to collect at least 5% of signatures of members and heads of municipalities. Also gubernatorial candidates present 3 candidacies to the Federation Council and election winner later appoints one of the presented candidates.

=== Declared ===
Candidate name, political party		Occupation	Status	Ref.
Natalya Bisyarina; Liberal Democratic Party		Lawyer	Registered	
Vyacheslav Fedorishchev; United Russia	Vyacheslav Fedorishchev	Acting Governor of Samara Oblast (2024–present); Former First Deputy Governor of Tula Oblast – Chairman of the Government of Tula Oblast (2022–2024)	Registered	
Aleksey Leskin; Communist Party		Deputy Chairman of the Samara Regional Duma (2016–present); Member of the Regional Duma (2007–present); 2018 and 2023 gubernatorial candidate	Registered	
Mikhail Maryakhin; SR–ZP		Member of Samara Regional Duma (2011–present); 2014, 2018 and 2023 gubernatorial candidate	Registered	
Vladimir Plyakin; New People	Vladimir Plyakin	Member of State Duma (2021–present)	Registered	
Stepan Solovyov; Green Alternative		Deputy chairman of Green Alternative party 2024 Chelyabinsk Oblast gubernatorial candidate	Registered	
Grigory Yeremeyev; Democratic Party		Pensioner; Perennial candidate 2023 gubernatorial candidate	Failed to qualify	
Vadim Baykov; Communists of Russia		First secretary of Communists of Russia regional committee Perennial candidate	Did not file	

=== Declined ===
- Aleksandr Stepanov (LDPR), Member of Samara Regional Duma (2016–present), 2018 and 2023 gubernatorial candidate (nominated for Senator)

=== Candidates for Federation Council ===
Incumbent Senator Farit Mukhametshin (Independent) was not renominated.

Gubernatorial candidate, political party	Candidates for Federation Council	Status
Natalya Bisyarina; Liberal Democratic Party	* Sergey Andrusenko, aide to State Duma member Vladimir Koshelev * Galina Putintseva, educator, former school principal * Aleksandr Stepanov, Member of Samara Regional Duma (2016–present), 2018 and 2023 gubernatorial candidate	Registered
Vyacheslav Fedorishchev; United Russia	* Dmitry Azarov, former Governor of Samara Oblast (2017–2024), former Senator from Samara Oblast (2014–2017) * Marina Sidukhina, Member of Samara Regional Duma (2010–2012, 2016–present) * Andrey Trifonov, Member of State Duma (2021–present)	Registered
Aleksey Leskin; Communist Party	* Natalya Bobrova, Togliatti State University law professor * Mikhail Matveyev, Member of State Duma (2021–present), 2014 gubernatorial candidate * Marina Yerina, Member of Samara Regional Duma (2021–present)	Registered
Mikhail Maryakhin; SR–ZP	* Maksim Guseynov, Member of Samara Regional Duma (2021–present) * Dmitry Makarenko, businessman * Aleksey Sazonov, former Member of Duma of Tolyatti (2013–2023), businessman	Registered
Vladimir Plyakin; New People	* Sergey Lushin, road construction executive * Sergey Pukhayev, businessman, 2023 gubernatorial candidate * Roman Zolnikov, businessman	Registered
Stepan Solovyov; Green Alternative	* Anatoly Arsenikhin, nonprofit executive * Natalya Polovinkina, accountant * Yelena Veretennikova, nurse	Registered
Grigory Yeremeyev; Democratic Party	* Vladimir Abdrakhimov, pensioner * Andrey Dolgov, jurisconsult, perennial candidate * Yelena Konyukhova, pensioner	Failed to qualify

== Results ==
Summary of the 6–8 September 2024 Samara Oblast gubernatorial election results
Candidate	Party	Votes	%
Vyacheslav Fedorishchev (incumbent)	United Russia	1,045,504	79.56
Aleksey Leskin	Communist Party	91,077	6.93
Natalya Bisyarina	Liberal Democratic Party	78,557	5.98
Mikhail Maryakhin	A Just Russia – For Truth	35,231	2.68
Vladimir Plyakin	New People	29,280	2.23
Stepan Solovyov	Green Alternative	16,546	1.26
Valid votes		1,296,195	98.64
Blank ballots		17,842	1.36
Total		1,314,065	100.00
Turnout		1,314,065	54.82
Registered voters		2,397,155	100.00

Governor Fedorishchev appointed Samara Regional Duma member Marina Sidukhina (United Russia) to the Federation Council, replacing incumbent Senator Farit Mukhametshin (Independent).

== See also ==
- 2024 Russian regional elections
