= 2026 Samara Oblast legislative election =

Regional legislative election in Russia

- 18–20 September 2026

All 50 seats in the Regional Duma 26 seats needed for a majority
- Turnout: 54.58% ▲8.11 pp
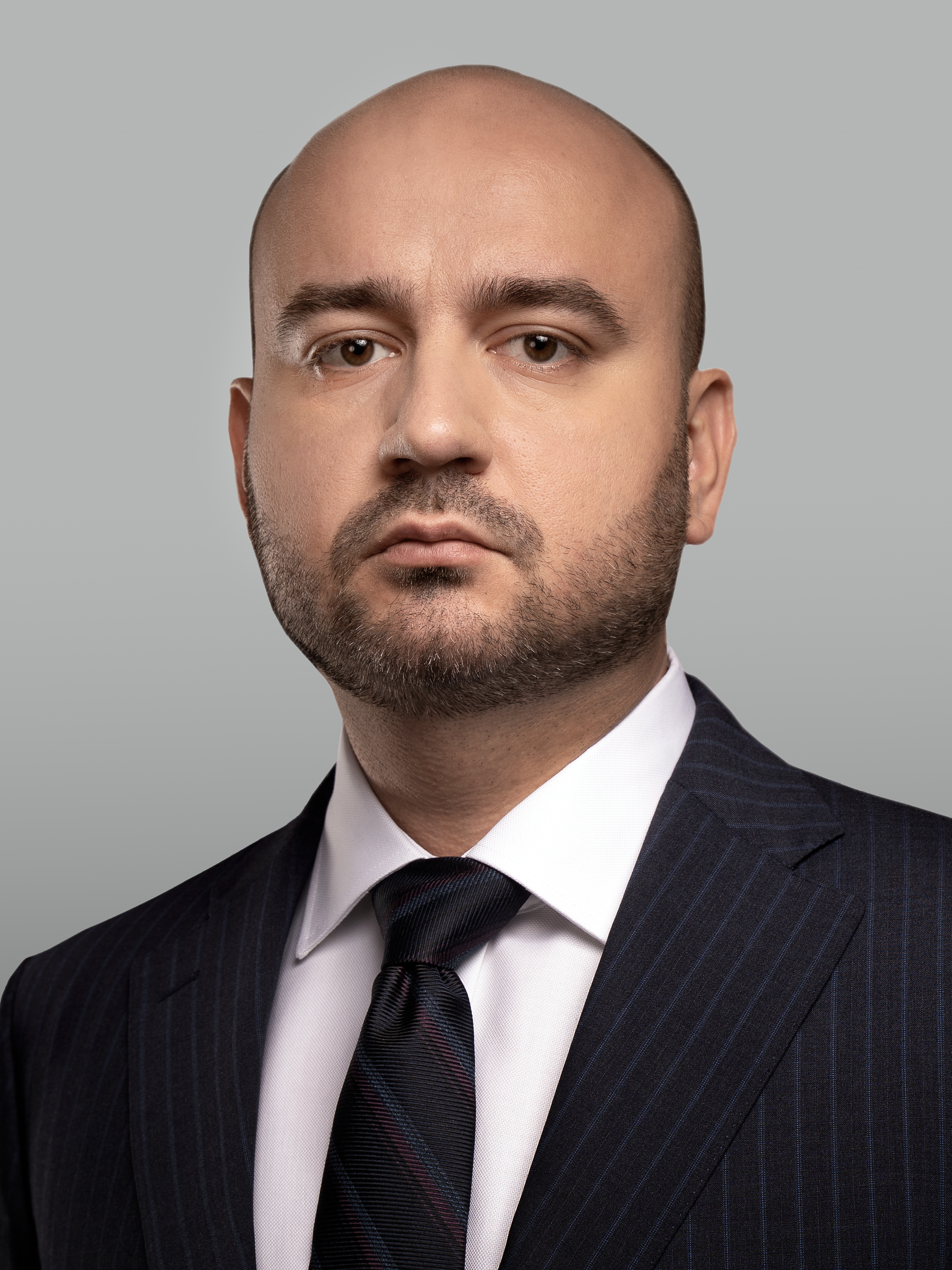

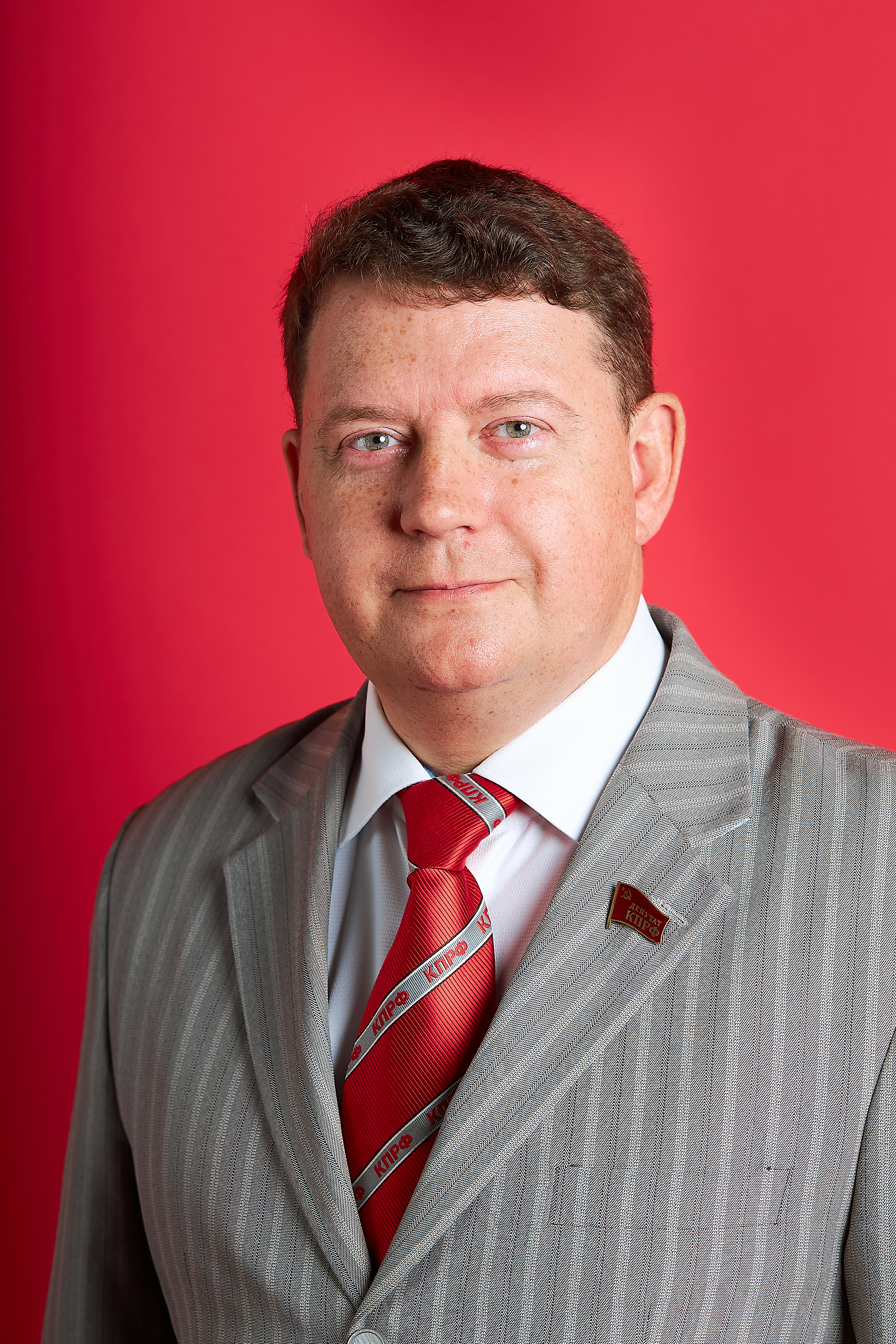

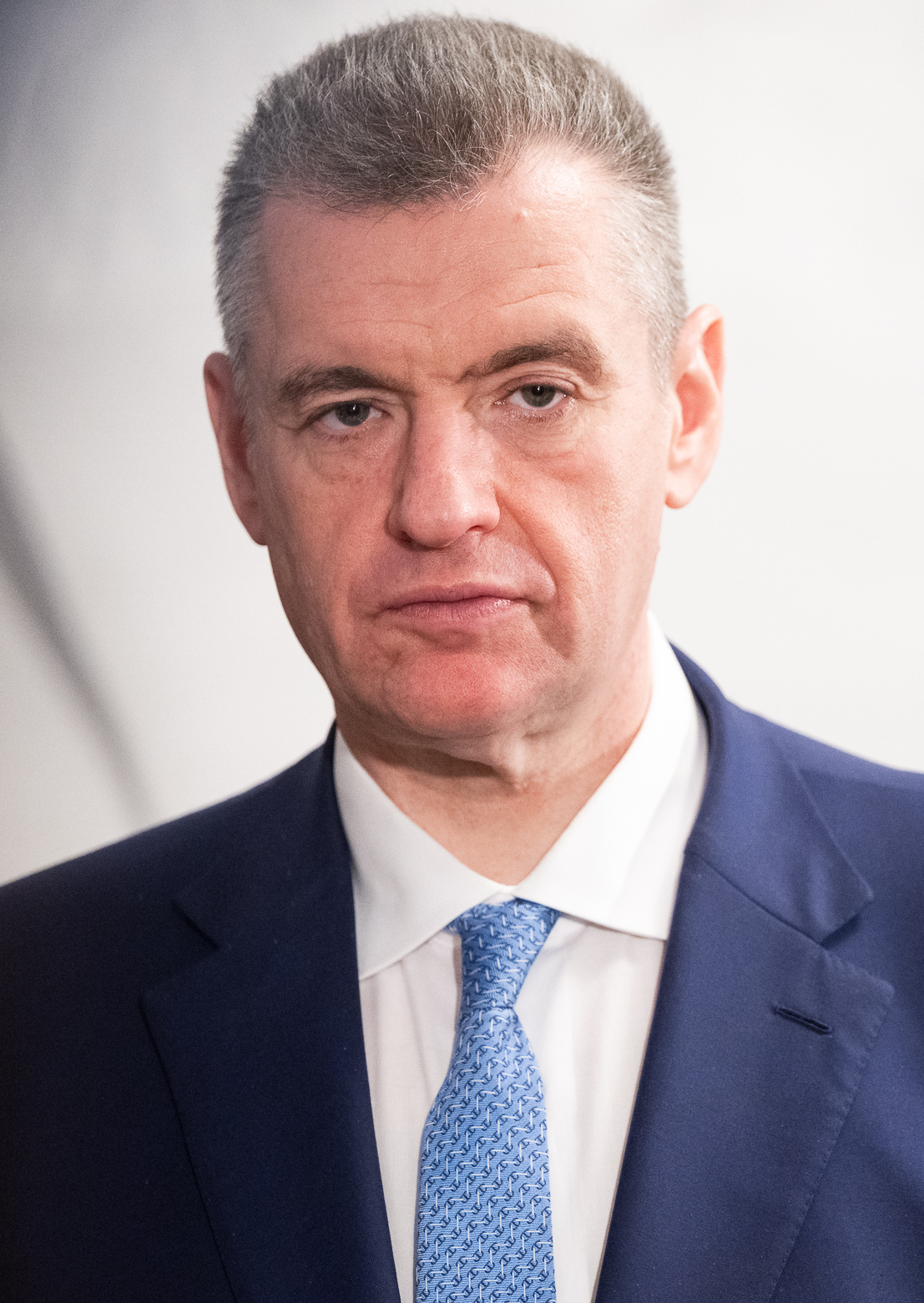

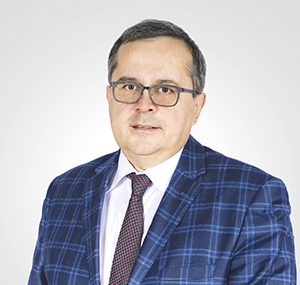
	Majority party	Minority party	Third party
Candidate	Vyacheslav Fedorishchev	Aleksey Leskin	Roman Markarov
Party	United Russia	CPRF	New People
Last election	44.26%, 36 seats	20.44%, 10 seats	5.72%, 1 seat
Seats won	42	6	1
Seat change	▲6	▼4	Steady
Popular vote	729,443	219,078	103,066
Percentage	56.84%	17.07%	8.03%
Swing	▲12.58 pp	▼3.37 pp	▲2.31 pp
	Fourth party	Fifth party	Sixth party
Candidate	Leonid Slutsky	Mikhail Maryakhin	Erik Prazdnikov
Party	LDPR	A Just Russia	Party of Pensioners
Last election	7.65%, 1 seat	6.32%, 2 seats	3.43%, 0 seats
Seats won	1	0	0
Seat change	Steady	▼2	Steady
Popular vote	95,013	43,532	31,449
Percentage	7.40%	3.39%	2.45%
Swing	▼0.65 pp	▼2.93 pp	▼0.98 pp
Chairman before election
Gennady Kotelnikov
United Russia
Elected Chairman
Yekaterina Kuzmichyova
United Russia
Senator before election
Andrey Kislov
United Russia
Senator after election
Vladimir Koshelev
United Russia

The 2026 Samara Regional Duma election took place on 18–20 September 2026, on common election day, coinciding with the 2026 Russian legislative election. All 50 seats in the Regional Duma were up for re-election.

United Russia retained its overwhelming majority in the Regional Duma, winning 56.8% of the vote and 24 single-mandate constituencies. Communist Party of the Russian Federation lost nearly half of its faction mostly through defeats in the constituencies. A Just Russia lost half of its voter share and failed to cross the 5% threshold.

== Electoral system ==
Under current election laws, the Regional Duma is elected for a term of five years, with parallel voting. 25 seats are elected by party-list proportional representation with a 5% electoral threshold, with the other half elected in 25 single-member constituencies by first-past-the-post voting. Seats in the proportional part are allocated using the Imperiali quota, modified to ensure that every party list, which passes the threshold, receives at least one mandate.

== Candidates ==
=== Party lists ===
To register regional lists of candidates, parties need to collect 0.5% of signatures of all registered voters in Samara Oblast.

The following parties were relieved from the necessity to collect signatures:

- United Russia
- Communist Party of the Russian Federation
- Liberal Democratic Party of Russia
- A Just Russia
- New People
- Russian Party of Pensioners for Social Justice
- Communists of Russia

№	Party	Oblast-wide list	Candidates	Territorial groups	Status
1	Communist Party	Aleksey Leskin • Mikhail Matveyev • Mikhail Usov	71	25	Registered
2	United Russia	Vyacheslav Fedorishchev • Aleksandr Kolsanov • Maksim Devyatov	77	25	Registered
3	Communists of Russia	Ruslan Khugayev • Sergey Turusin • Yelena Cherukhina	75	25	Registered
4	Liberal Democratic Party	Leonid Slutsky • Aleksandr Stepanov • Aleksandr Menshikh	75	25	Registered
5	A Just Russia	Mikhail Maryakhin • Aleksey Sazonov • Maksim Guseinov	32	25	Registered
6	New People	Roman Markarov • Aleksandr Spiridonov • Sergey Pukhayev	54	25	Registered
7	Party of Pensioners	Erik Prazdnikov • Dmitry Trunin • Vladimir Razumny	16	13	Registered

Russian Ecological Party "The Greens", Russian Party of Freedom and Justice and Yabloko, which participated in the last election, did not file, while Party of Growth was dissolved and merged into New People.

=== Single-mandate constituencies ===
25 single-mandate constituencies were formed in Samara Oblast. To register candidates in single-mandate constituencies need to collect 3% of signatures of registered voters in the constituency.

Number of candidates in single-mandate constituencies
Party	Candidates	
Party	Nominated	Registered
United Russia	25	25
Communist Party	25	25
A Just Russia	25	25
Liberal Democratic Party	25	24
New People	25	25
Communists of Russia	24	23
Independent	7	2
Total	156	149

== Results ==
=== Results by party lists ===
Summary of the 18–20 September 2026 Samara Regional Duma election results
Party	Party list					Constituency		Total	
Party	Votes	%	±pp	Seats	+/–	Seats	+/–	Seats	+/–
United Russia	729,443	56.84	▲12.58	18	▲2	24	▲4	42	▲6
Communist Party	219,078	17.07	▼3.37	5	▼1	1	▼3	6	▼4
New People	103,066	8.03	▲2.31	1	Steady	0	Steady	1	Steady
Liberal Democratic Party	95,013	7.40	▼0.65	1	Steady	0	Steady	1	Steady
A Just Russia	43,532	3.39	▼2.93	0	▼1	0	▼1	0	▼2
Party of Pensioners	31,449	2.45	▼0.98	0	Steady	–	–	0	Steady
Communists of Russia	26,273	2.05	▼2.09	0	Steady	0	Steady	0	Steady
Independent	–	–	–	–	–	0	Steady	0	Steady
Invalid ballots	35,463	2.76	▼0.41	—	—	—	—	—	—
Total	1,283,317	100.00	—	25	Steady	25	Steady	50	Steady
Turnout	1,283,317	54.58	▲8.11	—	—	—	—	—	—
Registered voters	2,351,339	100.00	—	—	—	—	—	—	—

United Russia faction leader Yekaterina Kuzmichyova was elected Chairwoman of the Regional Duma, replacing outgoing Chairman Gennady Kotelnikov (United Russia). State Duma member Vladimir Koshelev (United Russia) was appointed to the Federation Council, replacing incumbent Senator Andrey Kislov (United Russia).

=== Results in single-member constituencies ===
==== District 1 ====
Summary of the 18–20 September 2026 Samara Regional Duma election in Volzhsky constituency No.1
Candidate	Party	Votes	%
Svetlana Beskorovaynaya (incumbent)	United Russia	24,271	50.46%
Igor Fomenko	Communist Party	7,858	16.34%
Roman Sergeyev	New People	5,790	12.04%
Roman Ivanov	Liberal Democratic Party	4,001	8.32%
Aleksandr Makhonin	Communists of Russia	2,294	4.77%
Dmitry Bragin	A Just Russia	2,054	4.27%
Total		48,095	100%

==== District 2 ====
Summary of the 18–20 September 2026 Samara Regional Duma election in Samarsky constituency No.2
Candidate	Party	Votes	%
Roman Balter (incumbent)	United Russia	19,861	45.09%
Lev Khramov	Communist Party	8,223	18.67%
Dmitry Belozerov	New People	6,329	14.37%
Aleksey Zagoskin	Liberal Democratic Party	3,916	8.89%
Vadim Sleptsov	A Just Russia	2,161	4.91%
Yevgeny Sharkov	Communists of Russia	1,666	3.78%
Total		44,049	100%

==== District 3 ====
Summary of the 18–20 September 2026 Samara Regional Duma election in Zheleznodorozhny constituency No.3
Candidate	Party	Votes	%
Aleksey Degtev	United Russia	26,826	55.09%
Oksana Romanova	Communist Party	7,172	14.73%
Dmitry Panin	New People	4,943	10.15%
Vladimir Volkov	Liberal Democratic Party	3,722	7.64%
Vladimir Nesterov	Communists of Russia	2,902	5.96%
Aleksandr Serbinov	A Just Russia	1,628	3.34%
Total		48,698	100%

==== District 4 ====
Summary of the 18–20 September 2026 Samara Regional Duma election in Kuybyshevsky constituency No.4
Candidate	Party	Votes	%
Maksim Maksimov	United Russia	60,818	75.33%
Yevgeny Tarasov	Communist Party	5,970	7.39%
Aleksey Tomchuk	New People	3,896	4.83%
Yury Pichulev	Liberal Democratic Party	3,461	4.29%
Maksim Baranovich	A Just Russia	2,645	3.28%
Vasily Geichman	Communists of Russia	2,642	3.27%
Total		80,739	100%

==== District 5 ====
Summary of the 18–20 September 2026 Samara Regional Duma election in Novokuybyshevsky constituency No.5
Candidate	Party	Votes	%
Yelena Pakhomova	United Russia	15,341	34.38%
Mikhail Abdalkin	Communist Party	12,403	27.80%
Sergey Pukhayev	New People	5,861	13.14%
Oleg Vlasov	Liberal Democratic Party	3,623	8.12%
Sergey Chernov	Communists of Russia	2,997	6.72%
Olesya Gromova	A Just Russia	2,040	4.57%
Total		44,621	100%

==== District 6 ====
Summary of the 18–20 September 2026 Samara Regional Duma election in Central constituency No.6
Candidate	Party	Votes	%
Aleksey Stepanov	United Russia	14,112	38.29%
Maksim Guseinov (incumbent)	A Just Russia	10,632	28.85%
Valeria Shishova	New People	3,206	8.70%
Stepan Filatov	Communist Party	3,162	8.58%
Andrey Golovnev	Liberal Democratic Party	1,663	4.51%
Roman Yershov	Communists of Russia	1,476	4.01%
Mikhail Gaseinov	Independent	1,182	3.21%
Total		36,853	100%

==== District 7 ====
Summary of the 18–20 September 2026 Samara Regional Duma election in Tolyattinsky constituency No.7
Candidate	Party	Votes	%
Denis Volkov (incumbent)	United Russia	17,619	45.98%
Grigory Basisty	Communist Party	6,702	17.49%
Miron Sinyakov	New People	5,013	13.08%
Sergey Yegorov	Liberal Democratic Party	3,808	9.94%
Pavel Bakulin	A Just Russia	1,901	4.96%
Pavel Lutonin	Communists of Russia	1,346	3.51%
Total		38,320	100%

==== District 8 ====
Summary of the 18–20 September 2026 Samara Regional Duma election in Stavropolsky constituency No.8
Candidate	Party	Votes	%
Yekaterina Kuzmichyova (incumbent)	United Russia	31,009	58.92%
Aleksandr Osipov	Communist Party	6,355	12.07%
Roman Brazhnik	New People	4,834	9.18%
Valentina Semibratova	A Just Russia	3,478	6.61%
Andrey Polovkov	Liberal Democratic Party	3,243	6.16%
Yelena Cherukhina	Communists of Russia	2,092	3.97%
Total		52,630	100%

==== District 9 ====
Summary of the 18–20 September 2026 Samara Regional Duma election in Tatishchevsky constituency No.9
Candidate	Party	Votes	%
Aleksey Buzinny	United Russia	15,189	39.98%
Gennady Govorkov (incumbent)	Communist Party	6,672	17.56%
Yury Belousov	New People	5,641	14.85%
Aleksandr Naydenov	Liberal Democratic Party	4,381	11.53%
Aleksey Sazonov	A Just Russia	2,419	6.37%
Sergey Turusin	Communists of Russia	1,574	4.14%
Total		37,989	100%

==== District 10 ====
Summary of the 18–20 September 2026 Samara Regional Duma election in Avtozavodsky constituency No.10
Candidate	Party	Votes	%
Artyom Manyukhin	United Russia	10,168	30.20%
Aleksey Krasnov	Communist Party	7,776	23.09%
Vladimir Motryukov	New People	4,935	14.66%
Mikhail Maryakhin	A Just Russia	4,854	14.42%
Nataniel Papurin	Liberal Democratic Party	3,879	11.52%
Total		33,671	100%

==== District 11 ====
Summary of the 18–20 September 2026 Samara Regional Duma election in Bezymyansky constituency No.11
Candidate	Party	Votes	%
Vyacheslav Dormidontov (incumbent)	United Russia	10,849	40.13%
Natalya Bobrova	Communist Party	6,507	24.07%
Yelena Annaliyeva	New People	2,844	10.52%
Andrey Masterkov	Communists of Russia	2,148	7.94%
Yulia Pavlova	Liberal Democratic Party	2,000	7.40%
Aleksey Selivanov	A Just Russia	1,317	4.87%
Total		27,037	100%

==== District 12 ====
Summary of the 18–20 September 2026 Samara Regional Duma election in Kirovsky constituency No.12
Candidate	Party	Votes	%
Sergey Arsenyev	Communist Party	13,614	48.12%
Konstantin Ryadnov	United Russia	5,348	18.90%
Natalia Letyayeva	New People	3,540	12.51%
Maria Filatova	Liberal Democratic Party	2,323	8.21%
Maria Nikonorova	A Just Russia	1,327	4.69%
Oksana Shafigulina	Communists of Russia	821	2.90%
Total		28,289	100%

==== District 13 ====
Summary of the 18–20 September 2026 Samara Regional Duma election in Krasnoglinsky constituency No.13
Candidate	Party	Votes	%
Irina Shvedova	United Russia	43,739	67.11%
Pavel Yergunev	Communist Party	5,805	8.91%
Pavel Kravtsov	Liberal Democratic Party	5,011	7.69%
Mikhail Chernikov	New People	4,149	6.37%
Larisa Barykina	Communists of Russia	2,809	4.31%
Aleksey Troshin	A Just Russia	2,656	4.08%
Total		65,177	100%

==== District 14 ====
Summary of the 18–20 September 2026 Samara Regional Duma election in Sergiyevsky constituency No.14
Candidate	Party	Votes	%
Mikhail Belousov	United Russia	55,670	79.83%
Maksim Kondurov	Communist Party	5,735	8.22%
Natalya Silayeva	A Just Russia	2,613	3.75%
Aleksey Skokov	New People	2,502	3.59%
Igor Potseluyev	Communists of Russia	2,063	2.96%
Total		69,738	100%

==== District 15 ====
Summary of the 18–20 September 2026 Samara Regional Duma election in Pokhvistnevsky constituency No.15
Candidate	Party	Votes	%
Vladimir Subbotin (incumbent)	United Russia	77,011	84.54%
Ivan Nikitin	Communist Party	5,286	5.80%
Leisan Akhmedova	Communists of Russia	3,147	3.45%
Radmir Garayev	A Just Russia	2,443	2.68%
Svetlana Zhemchuzhnaya	New People	2,338	2.57%
Total		91,092	100%

==== District 16 ====
Summary of the 18–20 September 2026 Samara Regional Duma election in Komsomolsky constituency No.16
Candidate	Party	Votes	%
Vladimir Dutsev (incumbent)	United Russia	18,174	46.43%
Vasily Vorobyev	Communist Party	10,033	25.63%
Roman Zolnikov	New People	3,308	8.45%
Vladislav Sablin	Liberal Democratic Party	2,598	6.64%
Aleksey Filonenko	A Just Russia	2,001	5.11%
Yevgeny Khryanin	Communists of Russia	1,242	3.17%
Total		39,139	100%

==== District 17 ====
Summary of the 18–20 September 2026 Samara Regional Duma election in Zhigulyovsky constituency No.17
Candidate	Party	Votes	%
Artyom Shepelev	United Russia	47,658	69.09%
Pavel Mazaykhin	Communist Party	7,310	10.60%
Dmitry Syrodeyev	New People	3,756	5.45%
Aleksey Ardakov	Liberal Democratic Party	3,574	5.18%
Roman Novikov	A Just Russia	2,887	4.19%
Yevgeny Kochetkov	Communists of Russia	2,050	2.97%
Total		68,980	100%

==== District 18 ====
Summary of the 18–20 September 2026 Samara Regional Duma election in Syzransky constituency No.18
Candidate	Party	Votes	%
Sergey Grinko (incumbent)	United Russia	36,931	61.95%
Marina Yerina	Communist Party	7,714	12.94%
Dmitry Kopylov	Liberal Democratic Party	3,888	6.52%
Ilya Malyshev	New People	3,829	6.42%
Nikolay Gnevushev	A Just Russia	3,386	5.68%
Damir Stalin	Communists of Russia	2,128	3.57%
Total		59,616	100%

==== District 19 ====
Summary of the 18–20 September 2026 Samara Regional Duma election in Privolzhsky constituency No.19
Candidate	Party	Votes	%
Andrey Murzov (incumbent)	United Russia	53,987	81.05%
Dmitry Kornilov	Communist Party	3,255	4.89%
Yury Bogdanov	New People	2,914	4.37%
Vasily Gutnik	Liberal Democratic Party	2,261	3.39%
Armen Agasaryan	A Just Russia	2,050	3.08%
Ksenia Bazarnaya	Independent	1,023	1.54%
Total		66,613	100%

==== District 20 ====
Summary of the 18–20 September 2026 Samara Regional Duma election in Chapayevsky constituency No.20
Candidate	Party	Votes	%
Konstantin Doladov	United Russia	40,294	65.04%
Konstantin Morozov	Communist Party	6,106	9.86%
Aleksandr Brusnichkin	Liberal Democratic Party	5,436	8.77%
Yevgeny Zheltov	New People	3,819	6.16%
Aleksandr Bushev	A Just Russia	2,955	4.77%
Igor Osankin	Communists of Russia	1,674	2.70%
Total		61,950	100%

==== District 21 ====
Summary of the 18–20 September 2026 Samara Regional Duma election in Solnechny constituency No.21
Candidate	Party	Votes	%
Viktor Voropayev (incumbent)	United Russia	12,587	31.51%
Vyacheslav Murtazin	Communist Party	10,425	26.10%
Maksim Venediktov	Liberal Democratic Party	7,240	18.13%
Irina Sokolova	A Just Russia	4,770	11.94%
Maksim Maklayev	Communists of Russia	2,839	7.11%
Total		39,942	100%

==== District 22 ====
Summary of the 18–20 September 2026 Samara Regional Duma election in Promyshlenny constituency No.22
Candidate	Party	Votes	%
Yelena Sviridova	United Russia	9,199	28.70%
Renat Galimov	Communist Party	9,115	28.43%
Yelena Kharchenko	New People	3,976	12.40%
Rina Rayanova	Liberal Democratic Party	2,940	9.17%
Ruslan Dolgopolov	Communists of Russia	2,662	8.30%
Dmitry Makarenko	A Just Russia	2,285	7.13%
Total		32,057	100%

==== District 23 ====
Summary of the 18–20 September 2026 Samara Regional Duma election in Sovetsky constituency No.23
Candidate	Party	Votes	%
Anna Saraeva	United Russia	13,221	39.47%
Maksim Fyodorov (incumbent)	Communist Party	8,111	24.21%
Ilya Romanenko	New People	3,921	11.70%
Yevgeny Sabanin	Liberal Democratic Party	2,324	6.94%
Fanis Gafurov	Communists of Russia	2,318	6.92%
Nikolay Kozhukhov	A Just Russia	1,790	5.34%
Total		33,500	100%

==== District 24 ====
Summary of the 18–20 September 2026 Samara Regional Duma election in Kinelsky constituency No.24
Candidate	Party	Votes	%
Ramis Teregulov	United Russia	21,186	40.10%
Dmitry Aseyev	Communist Party	11,111	21.03%
Ivan Anufriyev	New People	7,600	14.39%
Andrey Vasilyev	Liberal Democratic Party	4,299	8.14%
Maria Afinogentova	Communists of Russia	3,142	5.95%
Yulia Pletneva	A Just Russia	3,132	5.93%
Total		52,827	100%

==== District 25 ====
Summary of the 18–20 September 2026 Samara Regional Duma election in Otradnensky constituency No.25
Candidate	Party	Votes	%
Nikolay Somov (incumbent)	United Russia	37,056	62.36%
Yevgeny Yandukov	Communist Party	7,372	12.41%
Dmitry Sychev	Communists of Russia	3,713	6.25%
Andrey Lazutin	New People	3,612	6.08%
Ramil Sapukov	Liberal Democratic Party	2,931	4.93%
Ruslan Borshchin	A Just Russia	2,570	4.32%
Total		59,425	100%

=== Members ===
Incumbent deputies are highlighted with bold, elected members who declined to take a seat are marked with ~~strikethrough~~.

Constituency
No.	Member	Party
1	Svetlana Beskorovaynaya	United Russia
2	Roman Balter	United Russia
3	Aleksey Degtev	United Russia
4	Maksim Maksimov	United Russia
5	Yelena Pakhomova	United Russia
6	Aleksey Stepanov	United Russia
7	Denis Volkov	United Russia
8	Yekaterina Kuzmichyova	United Russia
9	Aleksey Buzinny	United Russia
10	Artyom Manyukhin	United Russia
11	Vyacheslav Dormidontov	United Russia
12	Sergey Arsenyev	Communist Party
13	Irina Shvedova	United Russia
14	Mikhail Belousov	United Russia
15	Vladimir Subbotin	United Russia
16	Vladimir Dutsev	United Russia
17	Artyom Shepelev	United Russia
18	Sergey Grinko	United Russia
19	Andrey Murzov	United Russia
20	Konstantin Doladov	United Russia
21	Viktor Voropayev	United Russia
22	Yelena Sviridova	United Russia
23	Anna Saraeva	United Russia
24	Ramis Teregulov	United Russia
25	Nikolay Somov	United Russia

Party lists
Member	Party
~~Vyacheslav Fedorishchev~~	United Russia
Aleksandr Kolsanov	United Russia
Maksim Devyatov	United Russia
Aleksey Dolmatov	United Russia
Vyacheslav Romanov	United Russia
Aleksey Satonin	United Russia
Maksim Simonov	United Russia
Aleksey Yuryev	United Russia
Dmitry Litvinov	United Russia
Vladimir Koshelev	United Russia
Yury Kuznetsov	United Russia
Viktor Kuznetsov	United Russia
Dmitry Nazin	United Russia
Sergey Prokofyev	United Russia
Yelena Krylova	United Russia
Roman Plotnikov	United Russia
~~Aleksandr Zhivaykin~~	United Russia
Andrey Kolotovkin	United Russia
Denis Radchenko	United Russia
Kristina Gnatyuk	United Russia
Aleksey Leskin	Communist Party
Mikhail Matveyev	Communist Party
Mikhail Usov	Communist Party
Konstantin Ivanov	Communist Party
Vyacheslav Murtazin	Communist Party
Roman Markarov	New People
~~Leonid Slutsky~~	Liberal Democratic Party
Aleksandr Stepanov	Liberal Democratic Party

== See also ==
- 2026 Russian regional elections
