= 2023 Samara Oblast gubernatorial election =

← 2018	8–10 September 2023	2024 →
- Turnout: 53.74%
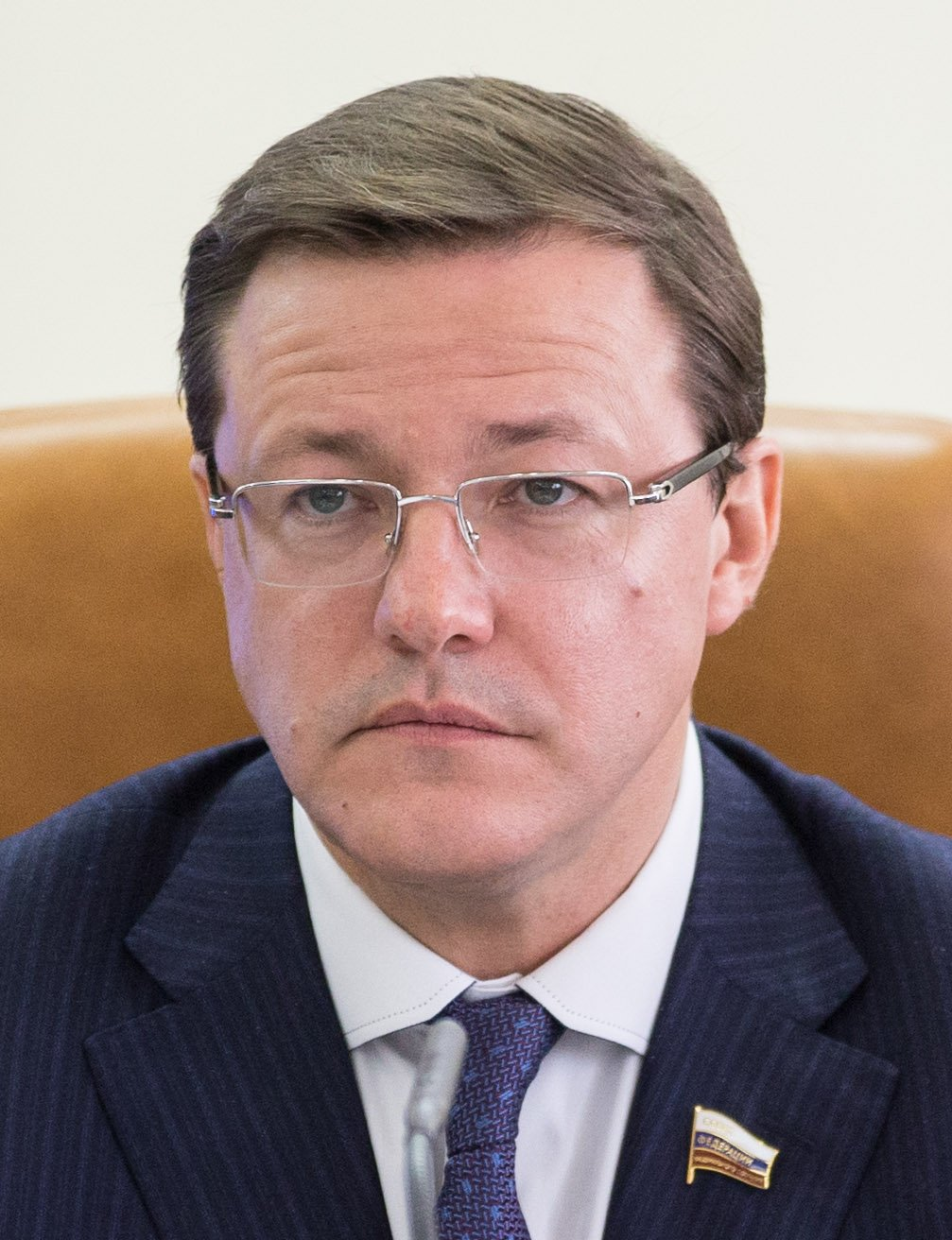
		CPRF
Candidate	Dmitry Azarov	Aleksey Leskin
Party	United Russia	CPRF
Popular vote	1,086,187	87,252
Percentage	83.82%	6.73%
Governor before election
Dmitry Azarov
United Russia
Governor-elect
Dmitry Azarov
United Russia

The 2023 Samara Oblast gubernatorial election took place on 8–10 September 2023, on common election day. Incumbent Governor Dmitry Azarov was re-elected to a second term in office.

== Background ==
Federation Council member Dmitry Azarov, a former Mayor of Samara, was appointed acting Governor of Samara Oblast in September 2017, replacing controversial 5-year Governor Nikolay Merkushkin, who resigned at his own request. Azarov overwhelmingly won the 2018 gubernatorial election in his own right with 72.63% of the vote over a field of 5 opponents.

== Candidates ==
In Samara Oblast candidates for Governor can be nominated only by registered political parties, self-nomination is not possible. However, candidates are not obliged to be members of the nominating party. Candidate for Governor of Samara Oblast should be a Russian citizen and at least 30 years old. Candidates for Governor should not have a foreign citizenship or residence permit. Each candidate in order to be registered is required to collect at least 5% of signatures of members and heads of municipalities. Also gubernatorial candidates present 3 candidacies to the Federation Council and election winner later appoints one of the presented candidates.

=== Registered ===
- Dmitry Azarov (United Russia), incumbent Governor of Samara Oblast (2017–present)
- Aleksey Leskin (CPRF), Deputy Chairman of the Samara Regional Duma (2016–present), Member of Samara Regional Duma (2007–present), 2018 gubernatorial candidate
- Mikhail Maryakhin (SR–ZP), Member of Samara Regional Duma (2011–present), 2015 and 2018 gubernatorial candidate
- Sergey Pukhayev (New People), businessman
- Aleksandr Stepanov (LDPR), Member of Samara Regional Duma (2016–present), 2018 gubernatorial candidate

=== Failed to qualify ===
- Grigory Yeremeyev (DPR), pensioner, perennial candidate

=== Declined ===
- Mikhail Abdalkin (CPRF), Member of Samara Regional Duma (2021–present)
- Gennady Govorkov (CPRF), Member of Samara Regional Duma (2016–present)
- Alexander Khinshtein (United Russia), Member of State Duma (2003–2016, 2018–present), Chairman of the Duma Committee on Informational Policy, Technologies and Communications (2020–present)
- Vladimir Koshelev (LDPR), Member of State Duma (2021–present)
- Andrey Lugovoy (LDPR), Member of State Duma (2007–present)
- Mikhail Matveyev (CPRF), Member of State Duma (2021–present), 2014 gubernatorial candidate
- Aleksandr Mileyev (United Russia), Deputy Chairman of the Samara Regional Duma (2021–present), Member of Samara Regional Duma (2011–present)
- Aleksey Mitrofanov (SR–ZP), Member of Samarsky City District Council of Deputies (2020–present)
- Yaroslav Nilov (LDPR), Member of State Duma (2011–present), Chairman of the Duma Committee on Labour, Social Policy and Veterans' Affairs (2016–present)

=== Candidates for Federation Council ===
- Dmitry Azarov (United Russia):
  - Dmitry Kholin, Member of Samara Regional Duma (2021–present)
  - Farit Mukhametshin, incumbent Senator from Samara Oblast (2018–present)
  - Yelena Sazonova, former Member of Duma of Tolyatti (2013–2018), AvtoVAZ union activist
- Aleksey Leskin (CPRF):
  - Mikhail Matveyev, Member of State Duma (2021–present), 2014 gubernatorial candidate
  - Vasily Vorobyev, Member of Duma of Tolyatti (2018–present), businessman
  - Marina Yerina, Member of Samara Regional Duma (2021–present)
- Mikhail Maryakhin (SR–ZP):
  - Maksim Guseynov, Member of Samara Regional Duma (2021–present)
  - Dmitry Makarenko, businessman
  - Aleksandr Razuvayev, Member of Duma of Tolyatti (2018–present), former Member of Samara Regional Duma (2011–2016)
- Sergey Pukhayev (New People):
  - Vadim Drykov, businessman
  - Sergey Lushin, road construction executive
  - Dmitry Zavyalov, foundation director
- Aleksandr Stepanov (LDPR):
  - Sergey Andrusenko, aide to State Duma member Vladimir Koshelev
  - Maria Voronina, pensioner
  - Yelena Yashina, Samara State University of Economics employee, business coach

== Polls ==
Fieldwork date	Polling firm	Azarov	Leskin	Stepanov	Maryakhin	Pukhayev	None	Lead
25 July – 10 August 2023	FOM	80%	7%	6%	5%	2%	1%	73%

== Results ==
Summary of the 8–10 September 2023 Samara Oblast gubernatorial election results
Candidate	Party	Votes	%
Dmitry Azarov (incumbent)	United Russia	1,086,187	83.82
Aleksey Leskin	Communist Party	87,252	6.73
Aleksandr Stepanov	Liberal Democratic Party	55,514	4.28
Mikhail Maryakhin	A Just Russia — For Truth	22,635	1.75
Sergey Pukhayev	New People	22,535	1.74
Valid votes		1,274,123	98.33
Blank ballots		21,655	1.67
Total		1,295,780	100.00
Turnout		1,295,780	53.74
Registered voters		2,411,123	100.00

Governor Azarov re-appointed incumbent Senator Farit Mukhametshin (Independent) to the Federation Council.

== See also ==
- 2023 Russian regional elections
