= Căpățînă =

Căpățînă is a Romanian surname. Notable people with the surname include:

- Eugen Căpățînă (born 1986), Romanian rugby union player
- Mihai Căpățînă (born 1995), Romanian footballer
- Svetlana Căpățînă (1969–2022), Moldovan politician
