= Marina Sidukhina =

- Марина Сидухина
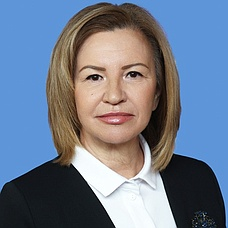

Senator from Samara Oblast
- Incumbent
- Assumed office 13 September 2024
- Preceded by: Farit Mukhametshin

Personal details
- Born: 28 October 1963 (age 62) Khryashchyovka, RSFSR, Soviet Union
- Party: United Russia
- Education: Samara State Medical University; MESI
- Awards: Medal of the Order "For Merit to the Fatherland"

Marina Gennadyevna Sidukhina (Russian: Марина Геннадьевна Сидухина; born 28 October 1963 in Khryashchyovka, Kuibyshev Oblast) is a Russian statesman. She is a Senator of the Federation Council and a representative of the executive branch of the Samara Oblast (since 13 September 2024). She is also Deputy Chair of the Federation Council Committee on Budget and Financial Markets. She is a member of United Russia party.

== Biography ==
Marina Sidukhina was born on 28 October 1963 in the village of Khryashchyovka, Stavropol District, Kuibyshev Oblast, to a family of rural pharmacists.

She graduated with honors from Privolzhskaya Secondary School in 1981.

She holds two higher education degrees: one in medicine and one in economics. She began her career as an obstetrician at the Novokuibyshevsk Maternity Hospital. In 1998, she became the head of the regional "Center for Social Assistance to Families and Children".

In 2007, she chaired the Novokuibyshevsk Urban District Duma, becoming the first female head of a local government representative body in the Samara Oblast.

In 2010, she was elected to the Samara Regional Duma of the 4th convocation. She served on the leadership team of the Local Government and Education and Science Committees.

On 18 September 2016 she was elected as a deputy of the Samara Regional Duma of the 6th convocation.

In 2025, she proposed raising the legal age for alcohol sales from 18 to 21.
