= List of ambassadors of Russia to Moldova =

Ambassador of the Russian Federation to the Republic of Moldova
- Emblem of the Russian Foreign Ministry

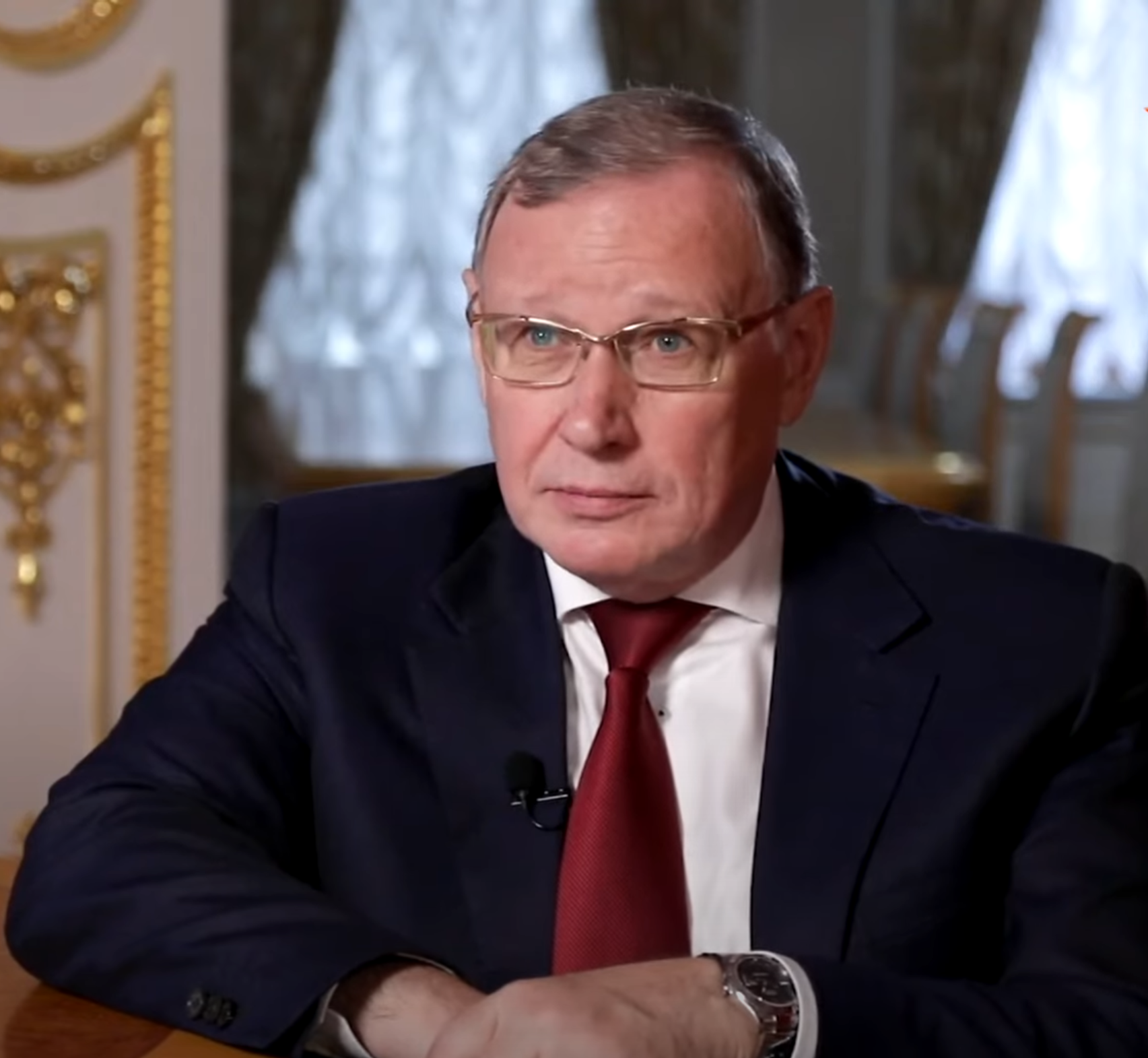
- Incumbent; Oleg Ozerov since 10 September 2024
- Ministry of Foreign Affairs; Embassy of Russia in Chișinău
- Style: His Excellency; The Honourable
- Reports to: Minister of Foreign Affairs
- Seat: Chișinău
- Appointer: President of Russia
- Term length: At the pleasure of the president
- Website: Embassy of Russia in Moldova

The ambassador extraordinary and plenipotentiary of the Russian Federation to the Republic of Moldova is the official representative of the president and the government of the Russian Federation to the president and the government of Moldova.

The ambassador and his staff work at large in the Embassy of Russia in Chișinău. The post of Russian ambassador to Moldova is currently held by Oleg Ozerov, incumbent since 10 September 2024.

== History of diplomatic relations ==
With the dissolution of the Soviet Union in 1991, diplomatic relations between the Russian Federation and the Republic of Moldova were first established on 6 April 1992, with the first Russian ambassador to Moldova, Vladimir Plechko, having been appointed on 18 March 1992. In 2012, a consulate was opened in Tiraspol, de facto capital of the separatist region of Transnistria, despite the objections of the Moldovan government.

== Representatives of the Russian Federation to the Republic of Moldova (1992–present) ==
Name	Title	Appointment	Termination	Notes
Vladimir Plechko	Ambassador	18 March 1992	11 May 1995	
Aleksandr Papkin	Ambassador	11 May 1995	20 October 1999	
Pavel Petrovsky	Ambassador	20 October 1999	1 August 2003	
Yuri Zubakov	Ambassador	1 August 2003	24 April 2004	
Yuri Mordvintsev	Chargé d'affaires	24 April 2004	19 October 2004	
Nikolai Ryabov	Ambassador	19 October 2004	27 July 2007	
Valery Kuzmin	Ambassador	27 July 2007	5 April 2012	
Farit Mukhametshin	Ambassador	5 April 2012	2 July 2018	
Oleg Vasnetsov	Ambassador	2 July 2018	10 September 2024	
Oleg Ozerov	Ambassador	10 September 2024		
