= List of ambassadors of Russia to Lithuania =

Ambassador of the Russian Federation to the Republic of Lithuania
- Emblem of the Russian Foreign Ministry
- Incumbent vacant
- Ministry of Foreign Affairs; Embassy of Russia in Vilnius
- Style: His Excellency; The Honourable
- Reports to: Minister of Foreign Affairs
- Seat: Vilnius
- Appointer: President of Russia
- Term length: At the pleasure of the president
- Website: Embassy of Russia in Lithuania

The ambassador extraordinary and plenipotentiary of the Russian Federation to the Republic of Lithuania is the official representative of the president and the government of the Russian Federation to the president and the government of Lithuania.

Before the downgrade of diplomatic relations between Russia and Lithuania following the Russian invasion of Ukraine, the ambassador and his staff used to work at large in the Embassy of Russia in Vilnius. Since the withdrawal of the Russian ambassador in April 2022, representation has been by chargé d'affaires.

== History of diplomatic relations ==
The territory occupied by Lithuania had been part of the Russian Empire since the eighteenth century. In the aftermath of the First World War and the collapse of the empire following the Russian Revolution in 1917, Lithuania declared independence on 16 February 1918. Diplomatic relations were established between Lithuania and the Russian Soviet Federative Socialist Republic on 12 July 1920, and Aleksandr Akselrod was appointed the first Plenipotentiary representative on 26 August that year. Representation continued until the Soviet occupation of Lithuania in 1940, after which Lithuania was de facto part of the USSR for the remainder of the existence of the Soviet Union, with the exception of a period of occupation by Nazi Germany between 1941 and 1944 during the Second World War. Soviet forces re-occupied Lithuania in 1944, after which Lithuania became a constituent part of the Soviet Union as the Lithuanian Soviet Socialist Republic.

As part of the dissolution of the Soviet Union in 1991, Lithuania's secession was recognized by the State Council of the Soviet Union on 6 September 1991. Diplomatic relations with Russia were established on 9 October 1991. Following growing diplomatic tensions in the aftermath of the Russian invasion of Ukraine, the Lithuanian government expelled the Russian ambassador on 4 April 2022, and closed the consulate in Klaipėda. Representation has since been by chargé d'affaires.

== List of representatives (1920–present) ==
=== Russian Soviet Federative Socialist Republic to Lithuania (1920–1923) ===
Name	Title	Appointment	Termination	Notes
Aleksandr Akselrod	Plenipotentiary representative	26 August 1920	1 March 1921	
Pavel Mostovenko	Plenipotentiary representative	1 March 1921	9 May 1921	
Semyon Aralov	Plenipotentiary representative	9 May 1921	1922	
Yakov Davydov	Plenipotentiary representative	February 1922	15 September 1922	
Aleksandr Paykes	Plenipotentiary representative	9 November 1922	7 February 1923	
Innokentiy Kozhevnikov	Plenipotentiary representative	7 February 1923	23 July 1923	

=== Union of Soviet Socialist Republics to Lithuania (1923–1940) ===
Name	Title	Appointment	Termination	Notes
Innokentiy Kozhevnikov	Plenipotentiary representative	23 July 1923	28 August 1923	
Ivan Lorents	Plenipotentiary representative	29 August 1923	9 July 1925	
Sergey Aleksandrovsky	Plenipotentiary representative	9 July 1925	3 June 1927	
Aleksandr Arosev	Plenipotentiary representative	21 May 1927	1 December 1928	
S. I. Rabinovich	Chargé d'affaires	1928	1928	
Vladimir Antonov-Ovseenko	Plenipotentiary representative	7 February 1929	19 January 1930	
Adolf Petrovsky	Plenipotentiary representative	31 January 1930	21 December 1930	
Mikhail Karsky	Plenipotentiary representative	19 December 1930	23 December 1936	
Boris Podolsky	Plenipotentiary representative	30 December 1936	1 November 1937	
Pavel Krapivintsev	Plenipotentiary representative	30 December 1937	8 October 1938	
Nikolai Pozdnyakov	Plenipotentiary representative	8 October 1938	3 August 1940	
Fyodor Molochkov	Chargé d'affaires	October 1939	October 1939	

=== Russian Federation to Lithuania (1992–present) ===
Name	Title	Appointment	Termination	Notes
Nikolai Obyortyshev	Ambassador	6 August 1992	14 August 1996	
Konstantin Mozel	Ambassador	2 November 1996	27 August 1999	
Yuri Zubakov	Ambassador	27 August 1999	1 August 2003	
Boris Tsepov	Ambassador	30 September 2003	5 May 2008	
Vladimir Chkhikvadze	Ambassador	5 May 2008	1 October 2013	
Aleksandr Udaltsov	Ambassador	1 October 2013	16 October 2020	
Aleksey Isakov	Ambassador	16 October 2020	4 April 2022	
Sergey Ryabokon	Chargé d'affaires	4 April 2022	October 2022	
Aleksandr Yolkin	Chargé d'affaires	October 2022		
