= Governor of Samara Oblast =

Highest-ranking official in Samara Oblast, Russia

- Standard of the Governor

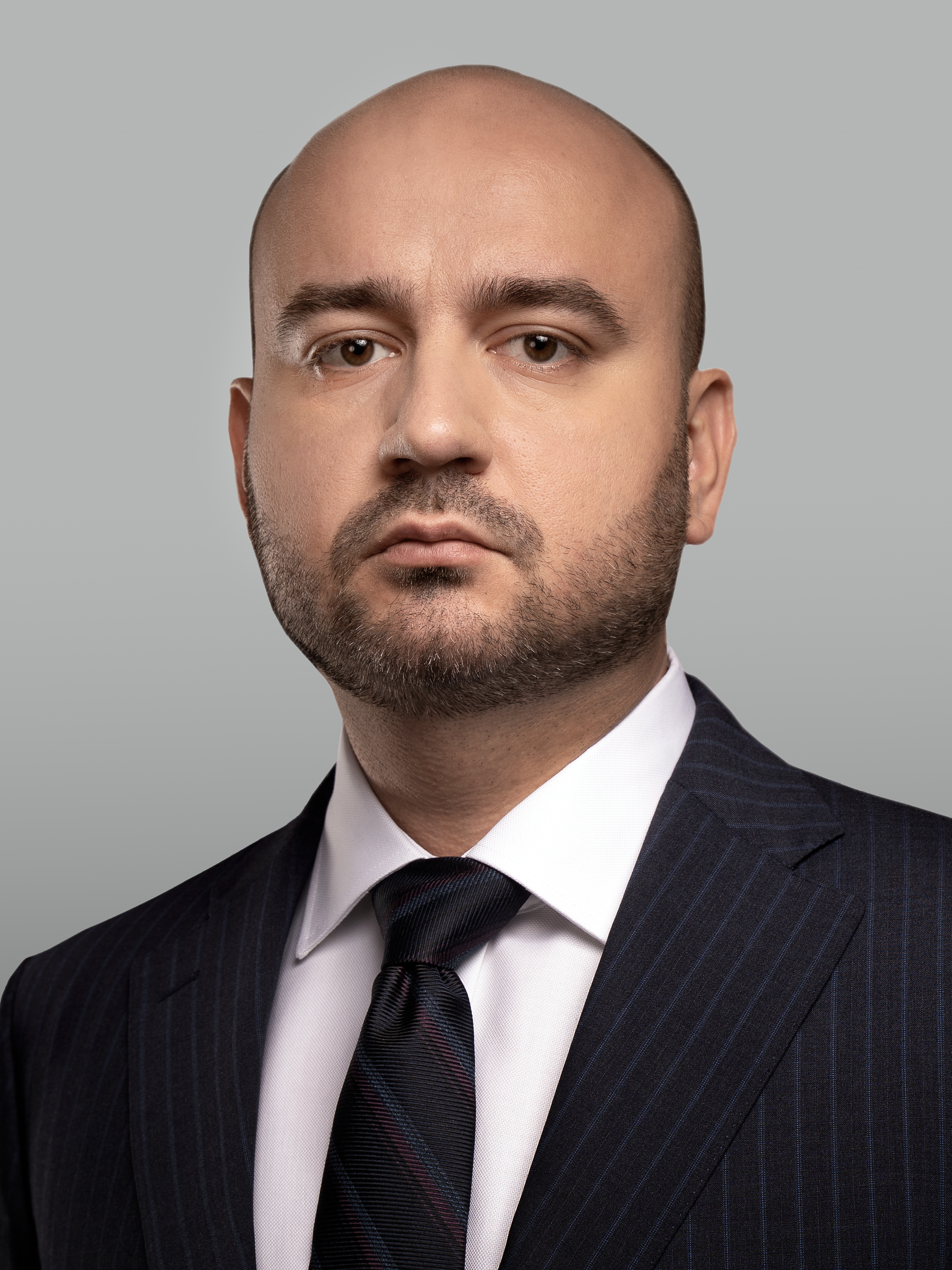
- Incumbent; Vyacheslav Fedorishchev since 13 September 2024
- Seat: Samara
- Term length: 5 years
- Formation: 1991
- Website: www.samregion.ru

The Governor of Samara Oblast (Russian: Губернатор Самарской области) is the head of government of Samara Oblast, a federal subject of Russia.

The position was introduced in 1991 as Head of Administration of Samara Oblast. The Governor is elected by direct popular vote for a term of five years and can hold the position for two consecutive terms.

== List of officeholders ==
#	Portrait	Governor	Tenure	Time in office	Party	Election
1		Konstantin Titov (born 1944)	31 August 1991 – 6 April 2000 (resigned)	8 years, 219 days	Independent	Appointed 1996
—		Yury Logoydo (1938–2023)	6 April 2000 – 9 July 2000	94 days	Independent	Acting
(1)		Konstantin Titov (born 1944)	9 July 2000 – 27 August 2007 (resigned)	7 years, 49 days	Union of Right Forces → United Russia	2000; 2005
2		Vladimir Artyakov (born 1959)	29 August 2007 – 10 May 2012 (resigned)	4 years, 255 days	United Russia	2007
3		Nikolay Merkushkin (born 1951)	12 May 2012 – 6 June 2014 (resigned)	5 years, 136 days	United Russia	2012
—		Nikolay Merkushkin (born 1951)	6 June 2014 – 23 September 2014	5 years, 136 days	United Russia	Acting
(3)		Nikolay Merkushkin (born 1951)	23 September 2014 – 25 September 2017 (resigned)	5 years, 136 days	United Russia	2014
—		Dmitry Azarov (born 1970)	25 September 2017 – 17 September 2018	6 years, 249 days	United Russia	Acting
4		Dmitry Azarov (born 1970)	17 September 2018 – 31 May 2024 (resigned)	6 years, 249 days	United Russia	2018; 2023
—		Vyacheslav Fedorishchev (born 1989)	31 May 2024 – 13 September 2024	2 years, 99 days	United Russia	Acting
5		Vyacheslav Fedorishchev (born 1989)	13 September 2024 – present	2 years, 99 days	United Russia	2024
