= Andrey Kislov =

Russian politician (born 1958)

- Андрей Кислов
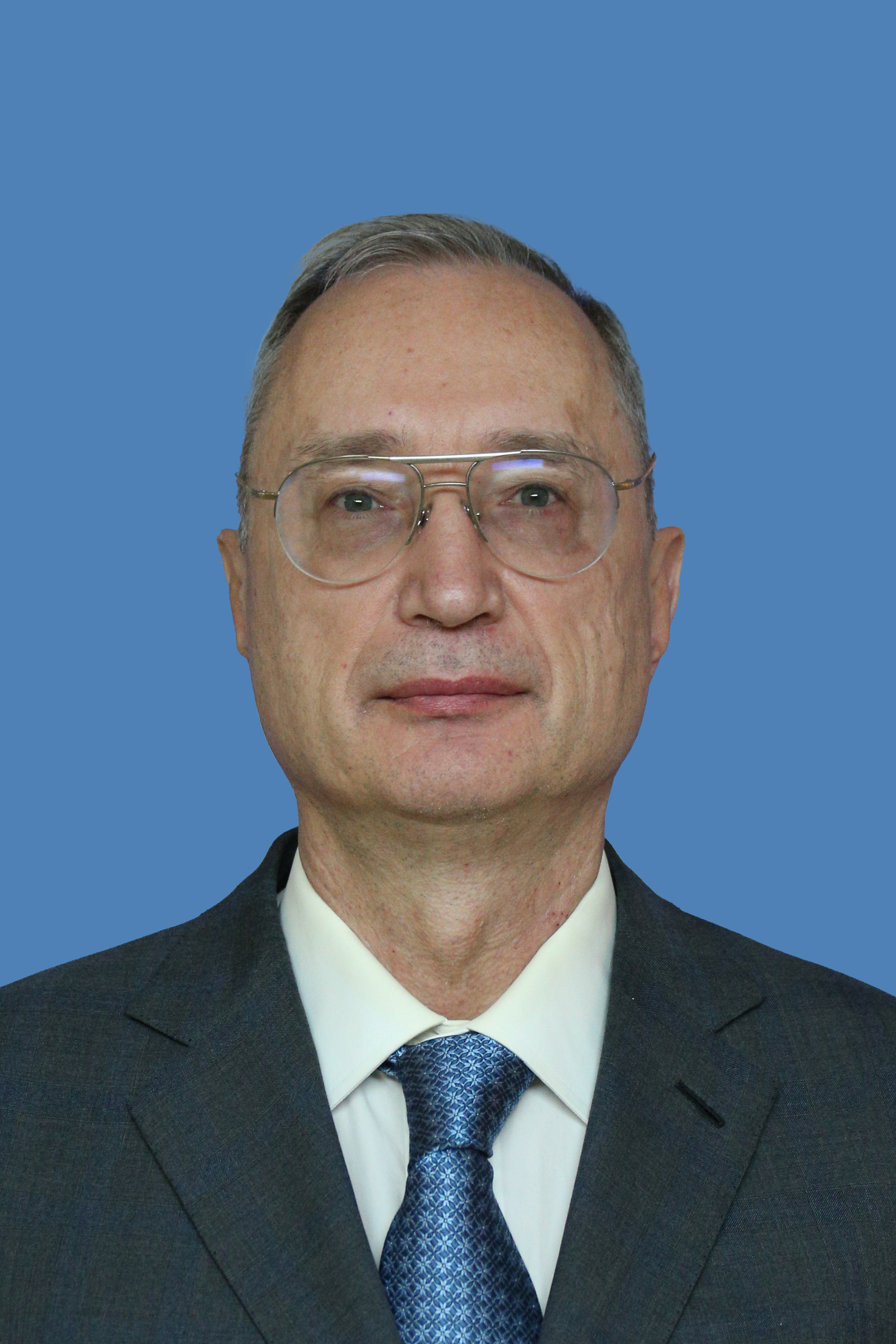

Senator from Samara Oblast
- Incumbent
- Assumed office 28 September 2021
- Appointed by: Samara Regional Duma
- Preceded by: Sergey Mamedov

Personal details
- Born: Andrey Kislov; 29 August 1958 (age 68) Samara, Russian Soviet Socialist Republic, Soviet Union
- Party: United Russia
- Education: Samara State University of Architecture and Civil Engineering

Andrey Igorevich Kislov (Russian: Андрей Игоревич Кислов; born 29 August 1958) is a Russian politician serving as a senator from Samara Oblast since 28 September 2021.

== Biography ==
Andrey Kislov was born on 29 August 1958 in Samara. In 1980, he graduated from Samara State University of Architecture and Civil Engineering. Afterward, he worked as a shift foreman and, later, as an engineer. From 1994 to 1997, he was the Deputy General Director of the Closed Joint-Stock Company "Volgopromgaz". From 2001 to 2019, Kislov was General Director of Gazprom Mezhregiongaz Samara. From 1997 to 2021, he served as a deputy of the Samara Regional Duma. On 28 September 2021, he became the senator from the Samara Regional Duma.

Andrey Kislov is under personal sanctions introduced by the European Union, the United Kingdom, the USA, Canada, Switzerland, Australia, Ukraine, New Zealand, for ratifying the decisions of the "Treaty of Friendship, Cooperation and Mutual Assistance between the Russian Federation and the Donetsk People's Republic and between the Russian Federation and the Luhansk People's Republic" and providing political and economic support for Russia's annexation of Ukrainian territories.
