= Alexandr Nesterovschi =

Moldovan politician (born 1981)

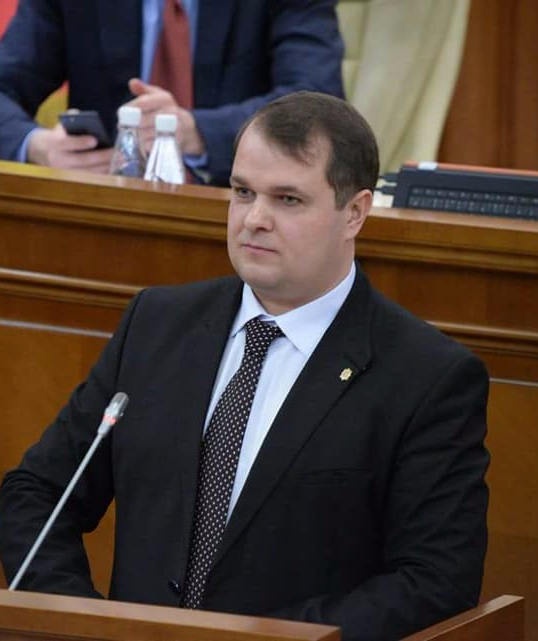
- Nesterovschi in 2017

Member of the Moldovan Parliament
- In office 15 February 2022 – 16 October 2025
- Preceded by: Svetlana Căpățînă
- Parliamentary group: Bloc of Communists and Socialists; Revival Party
- In office 9 December 2014 – 23 July 2021
- Parliamentary group: Party of Socialists

Personal details
- Born: 11 January 1981 (age 45) Răuțel, Moldavian SSR, Soviet Union

Alexandr Nesterovschi (born 11 January 1981) is a Moldovan politician who served as a Member of the Moldovan Parliament.

Nesterovschi was sentenced on 19 March 2025 to 12 years in prison. He did not attend the hearing. He was charged with passive corruption; he accepted funds from Moldovan fugitive oligarch Ilan Shor to found a political party. On the same day, Russian media announced that Nesterovschi had received Russian citizenship, for which he expressed gratitude in a statement to RIA Novosti. According to Party of Action and Solidarity (PAS) parliament member Lilian Carp, Nesterovschi escaped either to the Russian embassy or to the Russian-backed unrecognized breakaway region of Transnistria.

Moldova expelled three Russian diplomats from the country on suspicion of involvement in Nesterovschi's escape, prompting Russia to retaliate by expelling three Moldovan diplomats from the country.

Nesterovschi has been on EU's sanctions list since July 15, 2025, when he was targeted by the EU Council due to his role in bribing schemes organized and run by Ilan Shor to sway some Moldovan politicians to usher in Russian influence and derail Moldova from its EU accession path.
