= Yuri Zubakov =

Russian diplomat and politician (1943–2022)

- Юрий Зубаков

Ambassador of Russia to Moldova
- In office 1 August 2003 – 24 April 2004
- Preceded by: Pavel Petrovsky
- Succeeded by: Nikolai Ryabov

Ambassador of Russia to Lithuania
- In office 27 August 1999 – 1 August 2003
- Preceded by: Konstantin Mosel
- Succeeded by: Boris Tsepov

Head of the Apparatus of the Government of Russia
- In office 14 September 1998 – 19 May 1999
- Preceded by: Igor Shabdurasulov
- Succeeded by: Andrey Chernenko

Personal details
- Born: Yuri Antonovich Zubakov; 27 November 1943 Chita, Russian SFSR, USSR
- Died: 18 October 2022 (aged 78)
- Education: Higher School of the KGB
- Occupation: Diplomat

Yuri Antonovich Zubakov (Russian: Ю́рий Анто́нович Зубако́в; 27 November 1943 – 18 October 2022) was a Russian diplomat and politician. He led the Apparatus of the Government of Russia from 1998 to 1999 and was Russia's ambassador to Lithuania from 1999 to 2003 and to Moldova from 2003 to 2004. He had the federal state civilian service rank of 1st class Active State Councillor of the Russian Federation.

Zubakov died on 18 October 2022, at the age of 78.
