= Embassy of Russia, Chișinău =

Diplomatic mission of Russia to Moldova

Embassy of Russia in Chișinău
- The embassy's building in 2010
- Location: Chișinău, Moldova
- Address: 153 Stephen the Great and Holy Boulevard, Chișinău
- Coordinates: 47°1′55.13″N 28°49′12.84″E
- Ambassador: Oleg Ozerov
- Website: moldova.mid.ru

The Embassy of Russia in Chișinău is the official diplomatic mission of Russia to Moldova, hosted in the latter's capital city of Chișinău, at 153 Stephen the Great and Holy Boulevard.

The embassy has been subject to numerous controversies, including espionage scandals and the embassy's direct involvement in the escape in 2025 of Alexandr Nesterovschi, a member of the Parliament of Moldova that was sentenced to 12 years in prison for corruption.

== History ==
The Russian embassy in Chișinău is located at 153 Stephen the Great and Holy Boulevard, in the centre of Chișinău, the capital city of Moldova.

On 24 February 2022, the starting day of the 2022 Russian invasion of Ukraine, several dozen people organized a protest against the invasion of Ukraine in front of the embassy.

On 25 July 2023, the Ministry of Foreign Affairs of Moldova expressed its concern over a media report by Jurnal TV and The Insider regarding new surveillance equipment installed on the roof of the Russian embassy in Chișinău and on a neighbouring building used by Russia. The next day, the ministry announced that 45 Russian diplomats and other embassy staff would be expelled by 15 August due to "ongoing tensions and unfriendly actions", reducing the number of staff at the embassy to 25, closer to the number present in Moldova's embassy in Moscow at the time. The Moldovan foreign minister, Nicu Popescu, stated "For many years we have been the object of hostile Russian actions and policies. Many of them were made through the embassy."

On 1 August 2024, Oleg Vasnetsov, the Russian ambassador to Moldova, was summoned at the Moldovan foreign ministry to receive a note from the ministry informing him that an employee at the Russian embassy was being declared persona non grata in Moldova amidst an espionage scandal. Vasnetsov was summoned after Ion Creangă, the head of the Parliament of Moldova's Legal Directorate, and a border police officer were detained the previous day for 72 hours on suspicion of treason and conspiracy against Moldova. According to the prosecutors, both individuals would have been providing secret information to a Russian embassy employee since 2023.

On 31 March 2025, the Security and Intelligence Service (SIS) of Moldova announced it possessed confirmed information that the Russian embassy in Chișinău had helped Alexandr Nesterovschi, a member of the Moldovan parliament, escape in order to evade justice, enabling him to flee the day before he was sentenced to 12 years in prison over passive corruption and creating conditions for illegal party financing. In a press conference on 31 March, Alexandru Musteață, the director of the SIS, stated that representatives of the Russian diplomatic mission had transported Nesterovschi to Moldova's unrecognized breakaway region of Transnistria in a vehicle with a diplomatic registration plate on 19 March, with footage presented at the press conference showing Nesterovschi arriving at the embassy grounds the previous night.

Musteață described Nesterovschi's escape as an "extraction operation organized by Russian special services" and the embassy's actions as "hybrid actions against the Republic of Moldova". The embassy denied any involvement in Nesterovschi's escape and referred to Musteață's statements as "unfounded" and "unacceptable". Also on 31 March, Moldova's foreign ministry summoned Oleg Ozerov, the Russian ambassador to Moldova, and three Russian diplomats were expelled from Moldova, as there was evidence that they had "carried out activities contrary to their diplomatic status" according to the ministry. In retaliation, Russia expelled three Moldovan diplomats on 4 April.

== See also ==
- Embassy of Moldova, Moscow
- Moldova–Russia relations
