= Svetlana Căpățînă =

Moldovan politician (1969–2022)

Member of the Moldovan Parliament
- In office 23 July 2021 – 25 January 2022
- Succeeded by: Alexandr Nesterovschi
- Parliamentary group: Bloc of Communists and Socialists

Personal details
- Born: 2 October 1969 Orhei, Moldavian SSR, Soviet Union
- Died: 25 January 2022 (aged 52) Chișinău, Moldova
- Party: PCRM

Svetlana Căpățînă (2 October 1969 – 25 January 2022) was a Moldovan politician.

== Biography ==
Svetlana served in the Parliament of Moldova from 23 July 2021, until her death from COVID-19 on 25 January 2022, at the age of 52.
