= Vladimir Plyakin =

Russian politician

Vladimir Plyakin MP
- Владимир Плякин
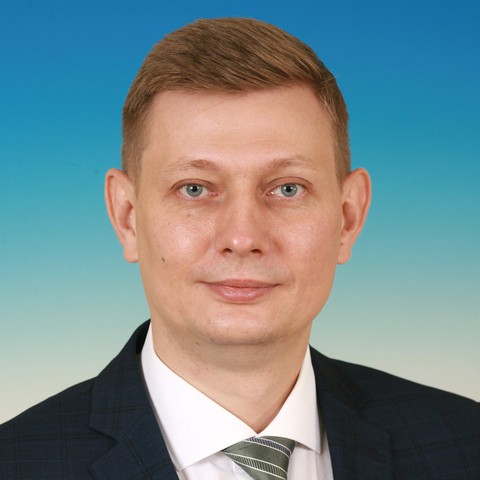
- official portrait, circa 2021

Member of the State Duma (Party List Seat)
- Incumbent
- Assumed office 12 October 2021

Personal details
- Born: 19 September 1981 (age 44) Kuybyshev, RSFSR, USSR
- Party: New People
- Education: Samara Academy of State and Municipal Management; Moscow City Pedagogical University

Vladimir Vladimirovich Plyakin (Russian: Владимир Владимирович Плякин; born 19 September 1981, Kuybyshev) is a Russian political figure and a deputy of the 8th State Duma.

After graduating from the Samara Municipal Institute of Management, Plyakin held various in senior positions in a number of Moscow companies, including Development Group and Continental Group. From 2017 to 2021, he was the Deputy Head of the Department for interaction with federal government authorities. Since September 2021, he has served as deputy of the 8th State Duma.

== Sanctions ==
He was sanctioned by the UK government in 2022 in relation to the Russo-Ukrainian War.
