= Farit Mukhametshin =

Russian politician and diplomat

- Фарит Мухаметшин
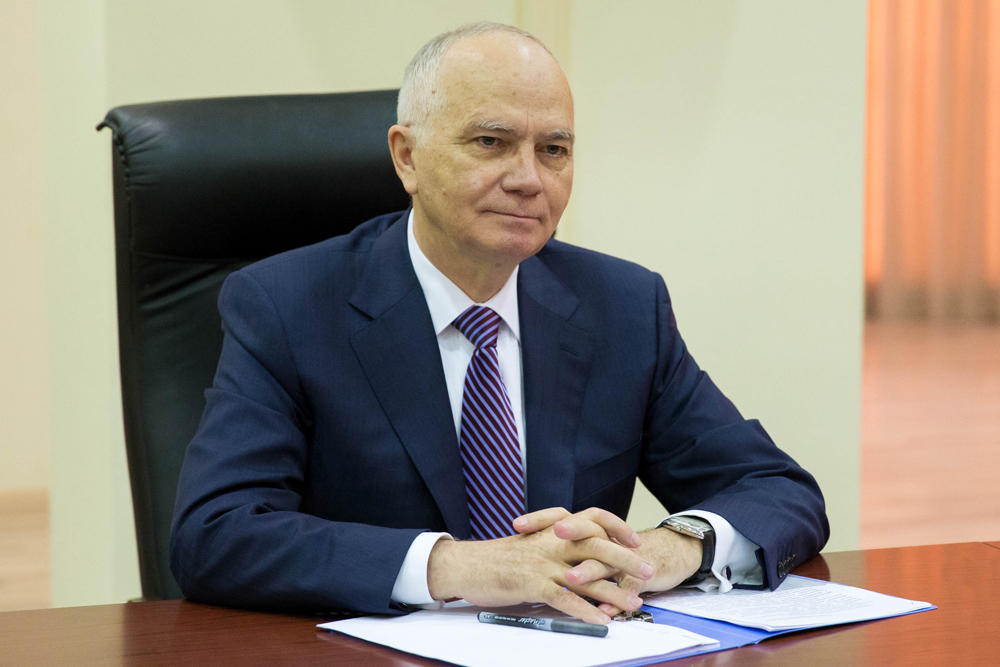
- Mukhametshin in 2013

Russian Federation Senator from Samara Oblast
- In office 17 September 2018 – 13 September 2024
- Preceded by: Dmitry Azarov
- Succeeded by: Marina Sidukhina

Ambassador of Russia to Moldova
- In office 5 April 2012 – 2 July 2018
- Preceded by: Valery Kuzmin
- Succeeded by: Oleg Vasnetsov

Head of Rossotrudnichestvo
- In office 17 October 2008 – 5 March 2012
- Succeeded by: Konstantin Kosachev

Ambassador of Russia to Uzbekistan
- In office 17 June 2003 – 17 October 2008
- Preceded by: Dmitri Ryurikov
- Succeeded by: Vladimir Tyurdenev

Personal details
- Born: 31 January 1947 (age 79) Bolshie Kokuzy, Apastovsky District, Tatar ASSR, Russian SFSR, Soviet Union
- Education: Kazan Aviation Institute; Moscow State Pedagogical Institute of Foreign Languages; Diplomatic Academy of the Ministry of Foreign Affairs; All-Russian State University of Justice
- Awards: Order "For Merit to the Fatherland" Third and Fourth Classes; Order of Alexander Nevsky; Order of Honour (Russia); Order of Friendship (Russia); Order of Friendship of Peoples; Order of Friendship (Uzbekistan); Order of Honour (Moldova)

Farit Mubarakshevich Mukhametshin (Russian: Фарит Мубаракшевич Мухаметшин; born 31 January 1947) is a Russian politician and diplomat. He served as a member of the Federation Council of the Federal Assembly as the representative of Samara Oblast between 2018 and 2024. He has previously been head of the Federal Agency for the Commonwealth of Independent States Affairs, Compatriots Living Abroad, and International Humanitarian Cooperation (Rossotrudnichestvo), and as ambassador of Russia to Moldova, and to Uzbekistan.

== Early life ==
Mukhametshin was born on 31 January 1947, in Bolshie Kokuzy, Apastovsky District, in what was then the Tatar Autonomous Soviet Socialist Republic, Russian Soviet Federative Socialist Republic, in the Soviet Union. He graduated from the Kazan Aviation Institute in 1970 with a degree as a mechanical engineer. He then went to work at the Central Aerohydrodynamic Institute, serving in various engineering and management positions. He was also part of the Committee of Youth Organizations of the USSR between 1983 and 1987, and served as deputy chairman of the committee. In 1983, Mukhametshin graduated from the Moscow State Pedagogical Institute of Foreign Languages.

== Diplomatic and governmental work ==
In 1987, Mukhametshin joined the Ministry of Foreign Affairs, and in 1990, graduated with honours from the Diplomatic Academy of the Ministry of Foreign Affairs. Between 1993 and 1995, he was first deputy director of the Department of the Ministry of Foreign Affairs of Russia for Relations with the Subjects of the Federation, Parliament and Social and Political Organizations. On 10 December 1995 he received the diplomatic rank of Envoy Extraordinary and Plenipotentiary 2nd Class. From 1995 until 1999, Mukhametshin was Plenipotentiary Representative of the Republic of Tatarstan under the President of Russia, and Deputy Prime Minister of Tatarstan. Between 1999 and 2003 he was a department head at the Apparatus of the Government of Russia. On 21 December 2000, he received a Certificate of Honour of the Government of Russia "for many years of impeccable work". Mukhametshin's work was further noted when on 24 July 2001 he received the official thanks of the Government of Russia, and on 19 February 2002, he received the official thanks of the President of Russia for the "development of the draft federal budget for 2002 and active participation in legislative activities". In 2003, Mukhametshin graduated from the All-Russian State University of Justice with a law degree.

On 17 June 2003, Mukhametshin was appointed ambassador to Uzbekistan. On 2 December 2004 he received the diplomatic rank of Envoy Extraordinary and Plenipotentiary 1st Class, with a further advancement to Ambassador Extraordinary and Plenipotentiary on 6 March 2007. He held the post of ambassador to Moldova until 17 October 2008. That same day Mukhametshin was appointed head of the Federal Agency for the Commonwealth of Independent States Affairs, Compatriots Living Abroad, and International Humanitarian Cooperation (Rossotrudnichestvo), concurrently with the position as special representative of the President of Russia for Relations with Member States. He served in this role until his release on 5 March 2012. On 5 April 2012, Mukhametshin was appointed ambassador to Moldova. He held the post until 2 July 2018.

== Federation Council ==
On 17 September 2018, Mukhametshin was appointed as a member of the Federation Council of the Federal Assembly as the representative of the executive power of Samara Oblast. The position had become vacant with the appointment of Dmitry Azarov as acting governor of Samara Oblast. Mukhametshin was deputy chairman of the council's Committee on International Affairs, before stepping down from the council on 13 September 2024.

=== Sanctions ===
Mukhametshin was placed under sanctions for his role as a member of the council in ratifying the treaties between Russia and the Donetsk People's Republic, and the Luhansk People's Republic. He was sanctioned by the European Union on 9 March 2022, the UK on 15 March 2022, Switzerland on 16 March 2022, Canada on 23 March 2022, Australia on 24 April 2022, New Zealand on 3 May 2022, Ukraine on 17 September 2022, and the US on 30 September 2022.

== Personal life ==
Over his career Mukhametshin has received various awards on honours. In 1986 he was awarded the Soviet Order of Friendship of Peoples, followed by the Russian Orders of Friendship and of Honour on 22 May 1997, and 23 February 1998 respectively. In 2012 he was awarded the Order "For Merit to the Fatherland" Fourth Class, subsequently receiving the order's third class on 18 April 2022. On 27 June 2017, he received the Order of Alexander Nevsky. He has been awarded the Uzbekistani Order of Friendship, the Moldovan Order of Honour, and the Russian Orthodox Church's Order of Holy Prince Daniel of Moscow Second Class. He has the degree of a doctor of political sciences, having defended his thesis on "Islam in Russian political life" at the Diplomatic Academy in 1998.

Mukhametshin is married, with two sons. In addition to his native Russian, he speaks English, Turkish, and Persian. He describes his interests as Oriental history, classical music, and the influence of religion on social and political processes. He has authored several books and articles.
