= Vladimir Koshelev =

Russian politician

Vladimir Koshelev MP
- Владимир Кошелев
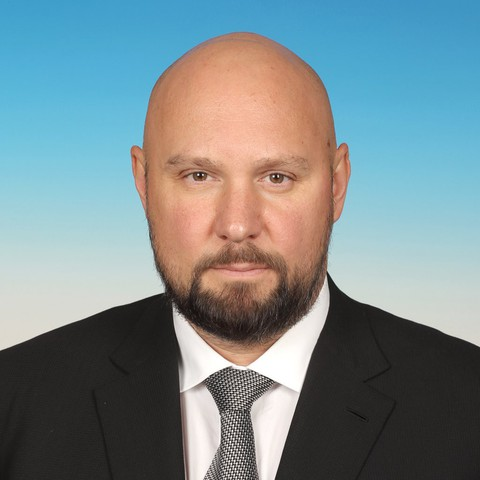
- official portrait, circa 2021

Member of the State Duma (Party List Seat)
- Incumbent
- Assumed office 12 October 2021

Personal details
- Born: 1 October 1974 (age 51) Kuybyshev, RSFSR, USSR
- Party: Liberal Democratic Party of Russia
- Education: Moscow State Technological Academy

Vladimir Alexeyevich Koshelev (Russian: Владимир Алексеевич Кошелев; born 1 October 1974, Kuybyshev) is a Russian political figure and a deputy of the 8th State Dumas.

From 1999 to 2005, Koshelev worked as deputy director of the Aviacor JSC. In 2006, he led the privatization of the company's construction division. In the same year, he was elected chairman of the board of directors of the Aviacor construction corporation, which in 2014 was renamed the Koshelev-project. In 2011, he was appointed the advisor to the Governor of the Ulyanovsk Oblast. From 2016 to 2021, he was the deputy of the Samara Regional Duma of the 6th convocation. Since September 2021, he has served as deputy of the 8th State Duma.

== Awards ==
- 2013 – Badge of Honor “Honored Builder of Russia”
- 2018 – Order of Friendship (South Ossetia)
- 2024 – Order of Friendship (Russian Federation)

== Sanctions ==
He was sanctioned by the UK government in 2022 in relation to the Russo-Ukrainian War.
