= Dmitry Azarov =

Russian politician (born 1970)

- Дмитрий Азаров
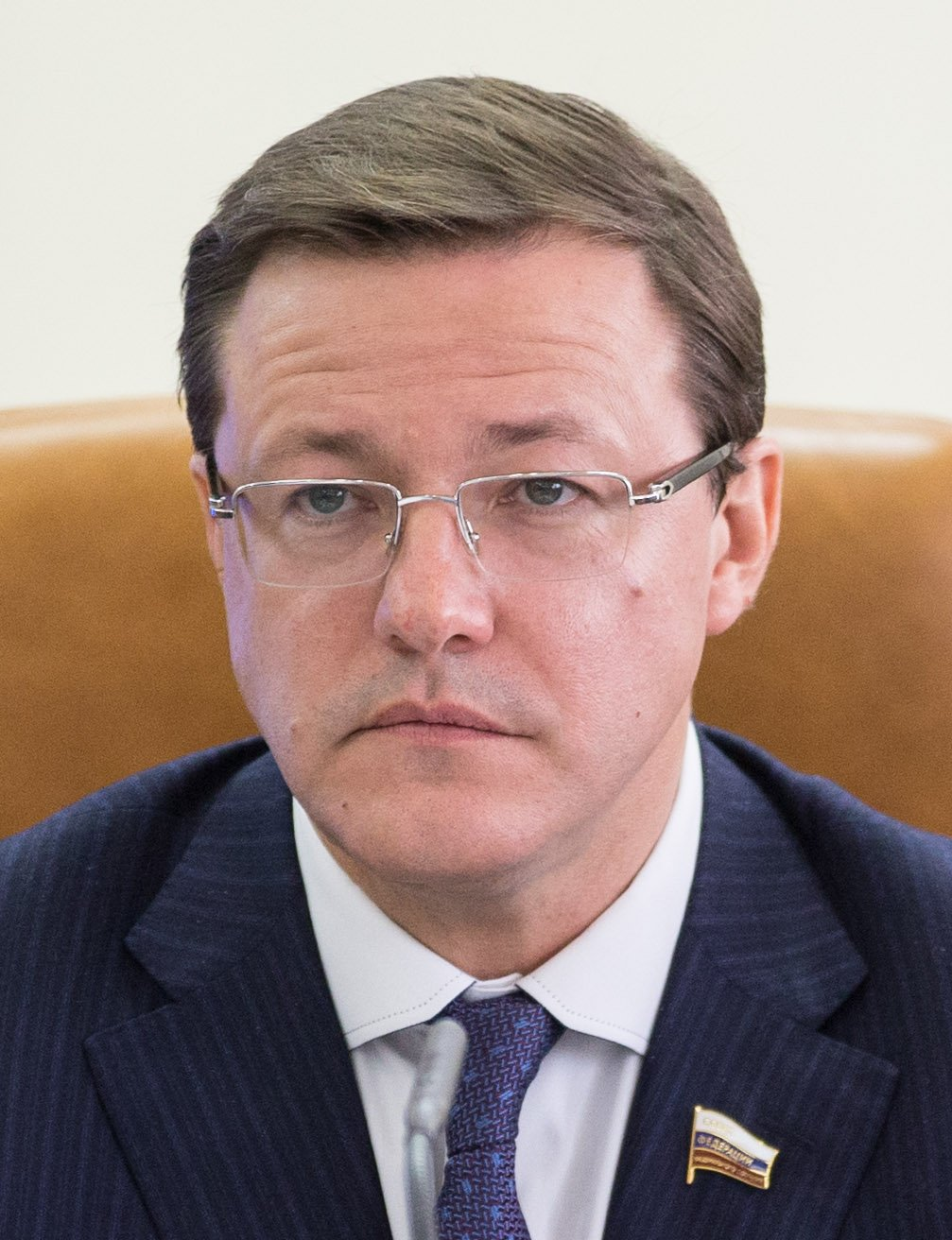
- Azarov in 2017

4th Governor of Samara Oblast
- In office 17 September 2018 – 31 May 2024
- Preceded by: Nikolay Merkushkin
- Succeeded by: Vyacheslav Fedorishchev

Acting Governor of Samara Oblast
- In office 25 September 2017 – 17 September 2018

Member of the Federation Council from the executive authority of Samara Oblast
- In office 10 October 2014 – 25 September 2017
- Preceded by: Konstantin Titov
- Succeeded by: Farit Mukhametshin

Head of the city district of Samara
- In office 15 October 2010 – 9 October 2014
- Preceded by: Viktor Tarkhov
- Succeeded by: Oleg Fursov

Minister of Nature Management, Forestry and Environmental Protection of Samara Oblast
- In office 2008 – 15 October 2010
- Preceded by: Aleksandr Fyodorov
- Succeeded by: Sergey Andreyev

Personal details
- Born: Dmitry Igorevich Azarov; 9 August 1970 (age 55) Samara, Russia, Soviet Union
- Party: United Russia
- Spouse: Vera Azarova

Dmitry Igorevich Azarov (Russian: Дмитрий Игоревич Азаров; born 9 August 1970), is a Russian politician and systems engineer. He served as the 4th Governor of Samara Oblast from 2018 to 2024. Azarov is a member of the bureau of the supreme council of the United Russia party. In July 2022, Azarov fell under international sanctions related to his party's support for the Russian invasion of Ukraine.

== Biography ==
=== Early life ===
Azarov was born in Kuybyshev, the largest city and administrative centre of Samara Oblast in the time of the Soviet Union. Kuybyshev is now called Samara. Samara is approximately 1,000 kilometers east-southeast of Moscow and approximately 1,400 kilometers south-east of Saint Petersburg. Samara lies at the confluence of the Volga and the Samara rivers.

In Azarov's youth, Kuybyshev was a closed city due to its importance in military research and manufacture and the Soviet space program.

Azarov's father worked in urban planning and his mother was a manufacturing inspector.

Azarov began working whilst a seventh grade student, packing pasta at school and as an older student, he worked as a road worker laying bitumen.

=== Education ===
In 1987, Azarov attended secondary school No. 132. His favorite subjects were physics and mathematics. In 1992, Azarov entered the Samara State Technical University, receiving a degree in systems engineering. In 1994, he completed his undergraduate education at the Buzuluk Financial and Economic College. In 2003, at the Russian State University of Trade and Economics, Azarov completed his dissertation on the topic, “Improving the organizational and economic mechanism for forming the profitability of a commercial organization".

=== Employment ===
From 1995 to 1998, Azarov was the deputy director for economics at the Samara boiler auxiliary equipment and pipelines factory. From 1998 to 2001, he was deputy director for economics and preparation of production at the Sintez-kauchuk petrochemical factory. He then worked in the structural production association, Volgapromkhim, which united six enterprises of Samara Oblast. Between 2001 and 2006, Azarov was the general director of Srednevolzhskaya Gas Company LLC.

In 2006, Azarov was appointed first deputy head of the Samara city district. In this role, he supervised the activities of the departments of finance, economic development, urban economy and ecology, industrial policy, entrepreneurship and communications.

In 2008, Azarov became minister of nature management, forestry and environmental protection of the Samara Oblast. In 2009, he was included in the first hundred personnel reserve of the President of Russia Dmitry Medvedev.

=== Political career ===
In the 2010 Russian elections, Azarov was elected (with 66.94% of the vote) to the position of mayor of the Samara city district and assumed the role on 15 October 2010. In 2012, Azarov was one of the authors of the concept of "open government" and "municipal filter" in the elections of heads of Russian regions.

On 10 October 2014, Governor Nikolay Merkushkin promoted Azarov to the executive committee of the federal council of Samara Oblast. He was the chairman of the committee on federal structure, regional policy, local self-government and affairs of the north.

Within the civil service, Azarov became an acting state councilor (first class). In 2017, as advisor to the governor, Viktor Kudryashov, Azarov became first deputy chairman of the council. On 25 September 2017, by decree of President Vladimir Putin, Azarov was appointed acting governor of Samara Oblast "until the person elected as the Governor of the Samara Oblast takes office".

From 2018 to 2024, Azarov was governor of Samara Oblast.

On 21 December 2020, Azarov became a member of the Presidium of the State Council of Russia.

== Governor of Samara Oblast ==
On 9 September 2018, Azarov was elected governor of Samara Oblast after winning 72.63% of the vote. His investiture was conducted at the Samara Academic Opera and Ballet Theatre on 16 September 2018. On 7 and 8 December 2019, at the XVIII congress of the United Russia Party, Azarov was inducted to the supreme council of the party.

Azarov began his gubernatorial activity by increasing social welfare payments. Unemployment in the region in 2018 decreased by 0.5% on he previous year. In 2018, the average salary increased by 10%; mining by 32.5%; manufacturing by 11% and car sales by 16%. Azarov managed a problem known as "deceived equity holders", making whole 1,500 shared construction stake holders and focussed on public procurement transparency. In the Togliatti district, in the second half of 2018, at least 5,500 jobs were created.

In May 2019, on the lobbying of residents and businesses, Azarov agreed to expand green spaces in Samara. He continued the "Blooming City" municipal program.

In 2020, Azarov initiated the reconstruction of the Togliatti embankment and construction of a bridge across the Volga river in the Klimovka area.

Azarov resigned as governor on 31 May 2024.

== Affiliations ==
From 2011 to 2014, Azarov was president of the Association of Cities of the Volga region, vice-president of the Union of Russian cities, vice-president of the Eurasian branch of the United Cities and Local Authorities World Organization, and the deputy chairman of the All-Russian Council of Local Self-Government for the Volga Federal District.

From 2014 to 2017, he was the chairman of the All-Russian Council of Local Self-Government (VSMS), elected at the V Congress.

== Personal life ==
Azarov's great-grandfather was an artisan in Smolensk where there remains a monument to him. Azarov's grand-fathers were officers. His grandmother were a medical practitioner and a teacher. Azarov's father was born in Samara. He worked at the planning institute in Vodokanal and Kuibyshevmelivodkhoz. Azarov's mother lived in Magadan. She was an inspector of the technical control department at the Kuibyshevoblbyttekhnika production association. She was also a chairman of the trade union committee.

Azarov's older brother, Oleg Azarov, works at the JSC Baltic Construction Company of Saint Petersburg (JSC BSK), which includes the Samara contractor, GK Volgatransstroy.

Azarov is married to Vera Azarova.

Two daughters, Polina and Alyona. Polina is a graduate of the Moscow State Institute of International Relations. Alyona enjoys singing and acting.

Azarov is a participant and supporter of basketball. He has been a player, supporter and children's coach. He also enjoys reading, listing Fyodor Dostoyevsky and Mikhail Bulgakov among his favourite authors.
