= Vyacheslav Fedorishchev =

Russian politician (born 1989)

- Вячеслав Федорищев
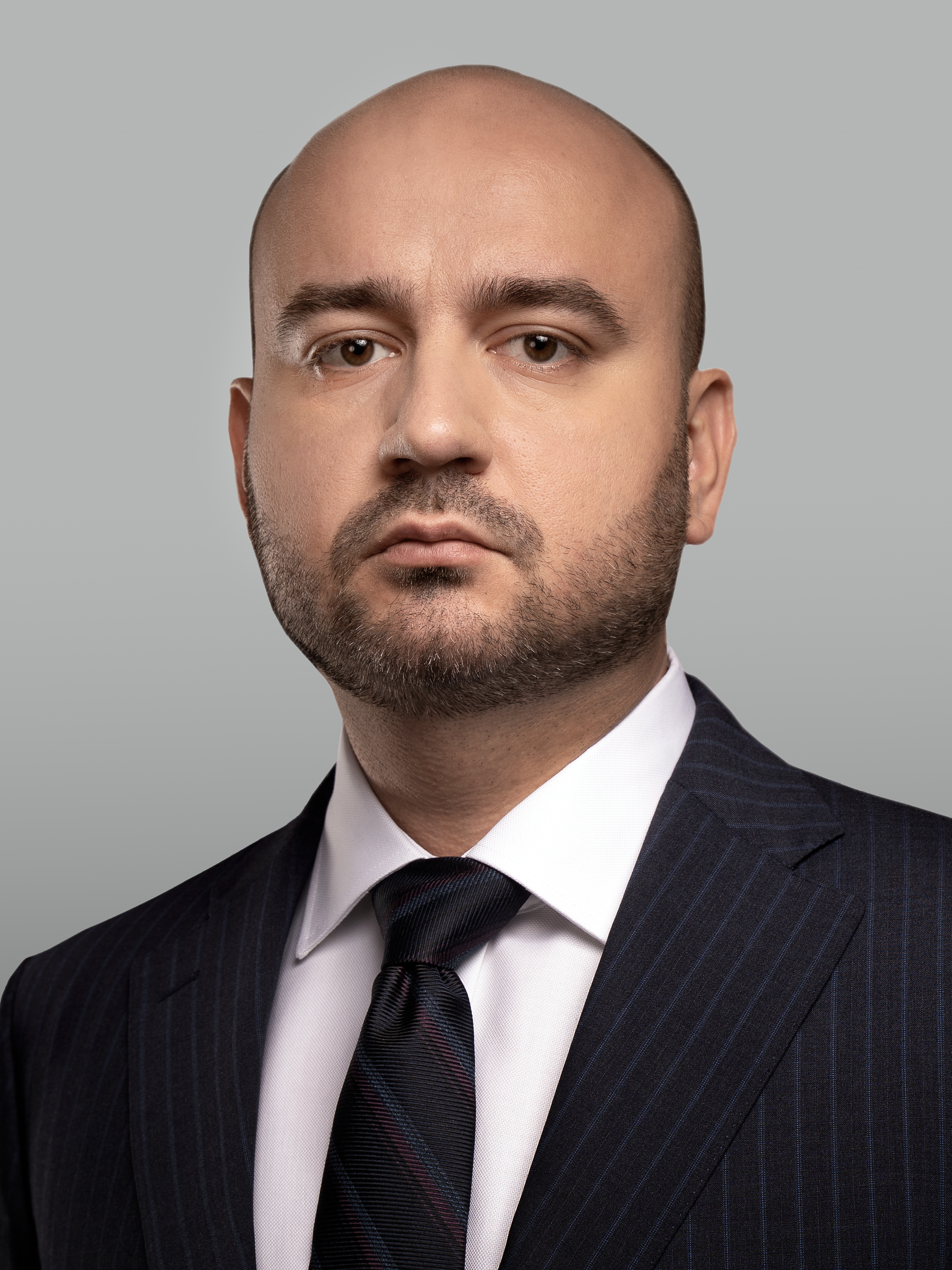
- Official portrait, 2024

Governor of Samara Oblast
- Incumbent
- Assumed office 13 September 2024; Acting: 31 May – 13 September 2024
- Preceded by: Dmitry Azarov

Deputy Chairman of the Government of Tula Oblast
- In office 4 October 2022 – 31 May 2024
- Governor: Aleksey Dyumin
- Preceded by: Valery Sherin

Personal details
- Born: 14 July 1989 (age 37) Volgodonsk, Rostov Oblast, Russian SFSR, Soviet Union
- Party: United Russia
- Education: Russian Presidential Academy of National Economy and Public Administration
- Awards: Order of Friendship; Medal of the Order "For Merit to the Fatherland" (2nd class)

Vyacheslav Andreyevich Fedorishchev (Russian: Вячеслав Андреевич Федорищев; born 14 July 1989) is a Russian statesman and politician. He is the current Governor of Samara Oblast since 13 September 2024.

== Biography ==
Vyacheslav Fedorishchev was born in Volgodonsk, Rostov Oblast.

In 2010, he graduated from the Faculty of Economics and Social Sciences of the Russian Presidential Academy of National Economy and Public Administration. Later, he became the candidate of Economic Sciences.

After graduation, he continued working at the Russian Presidential Academy of National Economy and Public Administration. Starting from 2010, he was a specialist, deputy head of the department, head of the scientific-information department there.

In 2012, he became an assistant to the rector. A year later, he was appointed a referent at the Department of Strategic Management, State Programs and Investment Projects of the Ministry of Economic Development of Russia. In 2015, he was appointed he head of the Department of Strategic Development of the Ministry of Economic Development of Russia. In 2016, he became the deputy governor of the Tula Oblast. In 2018, Fedorishchev was appointed the first deputy governor of the Tula Oblast.

In December 2018, Vyacheslav Fedorishev was included in the reserve of managerial personnel under the patronage of the head of state. He became the youngest politician to enter the presidential reserve pool.

In October 2022, he was appointed first deputy governor of the Tula Oblast and chairman of the government of the Tula Oblast.

On 31 May 2024, Vladimir Putin offered Vyacheslav Fedorishev the position of governor of Samara Oblast.
