= Samara Oblast =

First-level administrative division of Russia

Samara Oblast Самарская область (Russian)
- Oblast
- Flag Coat of arms
- Anthem: Anthem of Samara Oblast
- Interactive map of Samara Oblast
- Coordinates: 53°27′N 50°27′E
- Country: Russia
- Federal district: Volga
- Economic region: Volga
- Established: December 5, 1936
- Administrative center: Samara

Government
  - Body: Regional Duma
  - Governor: Vyacheslav Fedorishchev

Area
  - Total: 53,565 km^{2} (20,682 sq mi)
  - Rank: 50th

Population (2021 census)
  - Total: 3,172,925 ▼: 83.8% Russians; 2.9% Tatars; 1.4% Mordvins; 0.6% Armenians; 4.8% other; 6.4% not stated
  - Estimate (2018): 3,193,514
  - Rank: 11th
  - Density: 59.235/km^{2} (153.42/sq mi)
  - Urban: 79.6%
  - Rural: 20.4%
- Time zone: UTC+4 (MSK+1)
- ISO 3166 code: RU-SAM
- License plates: 63, 163, 763
- OKTMO ID: 36000000
- Official languages: Russian
- Website: www.samregion.ru

Samara Oblast (Note: Russian: Сама́рская о́бласть, romanized: Samarskaya oblastʹ, [sɐˈmarskəjə ˈobləsʲtʲ]) is a federal subject of Russia (an oblast). Its administrative center is the city of Samara. From 1935 to 1991, it was known as Kuybyshev Oblast. (Note: Russian: Ку́йбышевская о́бласть, romanized: Kuybyshevskaya oblast', [ˈkujbɨʂɨfskəjə ˈobləsʲtʲ]) As of the 2021 Census, the population of the oblast was 3,172,925.

The oblast borders Tatarstan in the north, Orenburg Oblast in the east, Kazakhstan (West Kazakhstan Province) in the south, Saratov Oblast in the southwest and Ulyanovsk Oblast in the west.

It is located in 3 natural landscape zones: the forest zone (coniferous and broad-leaved forests), the basis of which is pine-oak forests, pine forests and broad-leaved forests with the participation of oak and maple. Spruce occasionally joins them. Areas of the southern taiga are found on the coast of the region. The forest-steppe zone occupies the central regions of the region and is represented by a combination of areas of broad-leaved forests, most often oak and meadow steppes. Red deer, roe deer, elk, and sometimes bears are found in these forests. The south of the region is occupied by steppes consisting of typchak and sagebrush.

== History ==
The Samara region contains a remarkable succession of archaeological cultures from 7000 BC to 4000 BC. These sites have revealed Europe's earliest pottery (Elshanka culture), the world's oldest horse burial and signs of horse worship (the Syezzheye cemetery of Samara culture) and the earliest kurgans associated with Proto-Indo-Europeans (e.g., Krivoluchye assigned to Khvalynsk culture).

The Russian Empire established the Samara Governorate as a guberniya in the area in 1851. It was administered from the city of Samara. During the Revolution of 1905, a rebellion took place in November that year at the village of Novaya Tsarevshchina (now Volzhsky) and spread to the village of Stary Buyan, leading to the formation of the short-lived separatist state, the Stary Buyan Republic, within the governorate. There was little local opposition to the new state, and after the failure of local police to end the rebellion, it was successfully suppressed by a punitive expedition of Cossacks and gendarmes led by the vice-governor of the governorate in Samara.

After the decree of Tsar Nicholas II on religious tolerance the Old Believers were forced to pay taxes in favour to the Orthodox Church that they believed to be heretical. The then Ministry of Interior forbade Samara's public officials to prosecute in this practice, which was contrary to the spirit of the decree.

During the Russian Civil War, the region was heavily affected by the Russian famine of 1921–1922.

Under Soviet rule most of the governorate's territory was transformed into the Middle Volga Oblast, which was established on May 14, 1928, and a year later on October 20, 1929, it was again transformed into Middle Volga Krai. On January 27, 1935, Samara and the Middle Volga Krai were renamed Kuybyshev and Kuybyshev Krai, respectively, in honor of the Bolshevik leader Valerian Kuybyshev. On December 5, 1936, Kuybyshev Krai was transformed into Kuybyshev Oblast upon the adoption of the 1936 Soviet Constitution. On January 25, 1991 by the Decree of the Presidium of the Supreme Soviet of the RSFSR, the Kuibyshev Oblast was renamed the Samara Oblast. On April 21, 1992, the Congress of People's Deputies of Russia approved the decision of the presidium of the parliament to rename the region, amending Art. 71 of the Constitution of the RSFSR of 1978, which entered into force on May 16, 1992.

On 1 August 1997 Samara Oblast signed a power-sharing agreement with the federal government, granting it autonomy. This agreement would be abolished on 22 February 2002.

Tolyatti is the largest city in Russia which does not serve as the administrative center of a federal subject.

== Demographics ==
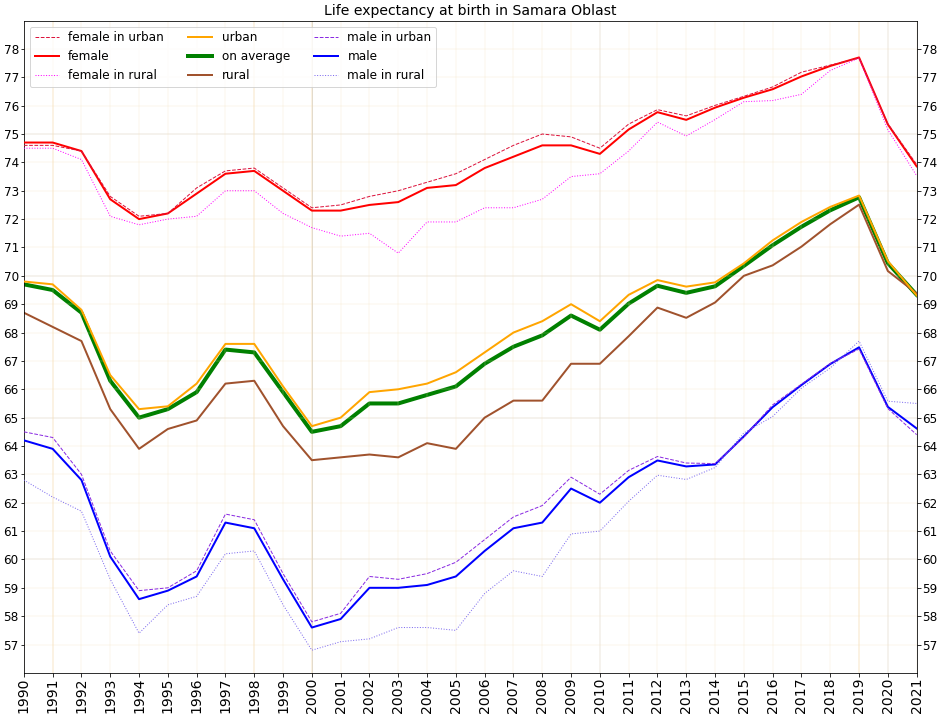
Life expectancy at birth in Samara Oblast

Historical population
Year	Pop.	±%
1897	2,751,336	—
1926	2,413,403	−12.3%
1959	2,258,359	−6.4%
1970	2,750,926	+21.8%
1979	3,092,866	+12.4%
1989	3,265,586	+5.6%
2002	3,239,737	−0.8%
2010	3,215,532	−0.7%
2021	3,172,925	−1.3%
Source: Census data

Population: 3,172,925 (2021 census); 3,215,532 (2010 census); 3,239,737 (2002 census); 3,265,586 (1989 Soviet census).

Vital statistics for 2024:

- Births: 22,992 (7.4 per 1,000)
- Deaths: 43,273 (13.9 per 1,000)

Total fertility rate (2024):
1.31 children per woman

Life expectancy (2021):
Total — 69.33 years (male — 64.62, female — 73.86)

Ethnic groups: According to the 2010 Census, the ethnic makeup of the oblast was:

- 2,645,124 Russians (85.6%)
- 126,124 Tatars (4.1%)
- 84,105 Chuvash (2.7%)
- 65,447 Mordvins (2.1%)
- 42,169 Ukrainians (1.4%)
- 22,981 Armenians (0.7%)
- 123,691 people were registered from administrative databases, and could not declare an ethnicity. It is estimated that the proportion of ethnicities in this group is the same as that of the declared group.

Religion

Religion in Samara Oblast as of 2012 (Sreda Arena Atlas)
Russian Orthodoxy	35%
Other Orthodox	1.6%
Other Christians	7.8%
Islam	1.9%
Rodnovery and other native faiths	0.8%
Spiritual but not religious	29.6%
Atheism and irreligion	12.6%
Other and undeclared	10.7%

According to a 2012 survey 35% of the population of Samara Oblast adheres to the Russian Orthodox Church, 7% are unaffiliated generic Christians, 1% are Orthodox Christian believers who do not belong to any church or are members of non-Russian Orthodox churches, 3% are Muslims, and 1% of the population are adherents of Rodnovery (Slavic folk religion). In addition, 30% of the population declares to be "spiritual but not religious", 13% is atheist, and a further 10% follows other religions or did not give an answer to the question.

== Economy ==
In 1997, Samara Oblast became one of the few federal subjects to receive the approval of the President of Russia to implement external bonded loans (Presidential decree No. 1212, dated 12.10.1997 "On Creating Conditions to Conduct Loans Operations on the Internal and External Capital Markets").

Samara Oblast (or Samara Region) has several special investment sites which are built to implement new plants, industries, factories, create new jobs and increase investments in the Samara Region, in addition to legacy plants such as the Kuibyshev refinery.

- Special economic zone of industrial-production type «Togliatti»
- Industrial Park «Preobrazhenka»
- Industrial Park «Chapaevsk»
- Technopark in the sphere of high technologies "Zhiguli Valley"
- Industrial Park «Togliattisyntez»
- Industrial Park «Stavropolskiy»

In order to help Russian and foreign investors to select a site for project implementation, to provide consulting services free of charge Ministry for Economic Development, Investments and Trade of the Samara Region organized a Non-Profit Unitary Organization – Fund "Investment Promotion Agency of the Samara Region".

The Agency cooperates with investors on the "one-stop-shop" principle, as well as:

- Searches for foreign partners according to the companies' priorities;
- Provides investment consulting services and monitors the implementation of investment projects;
- Promotes the investment opportunities of the Samara Region in Russia and foreign countries by participation in conferences, exhibitions, forums and other events.

== Politics ==
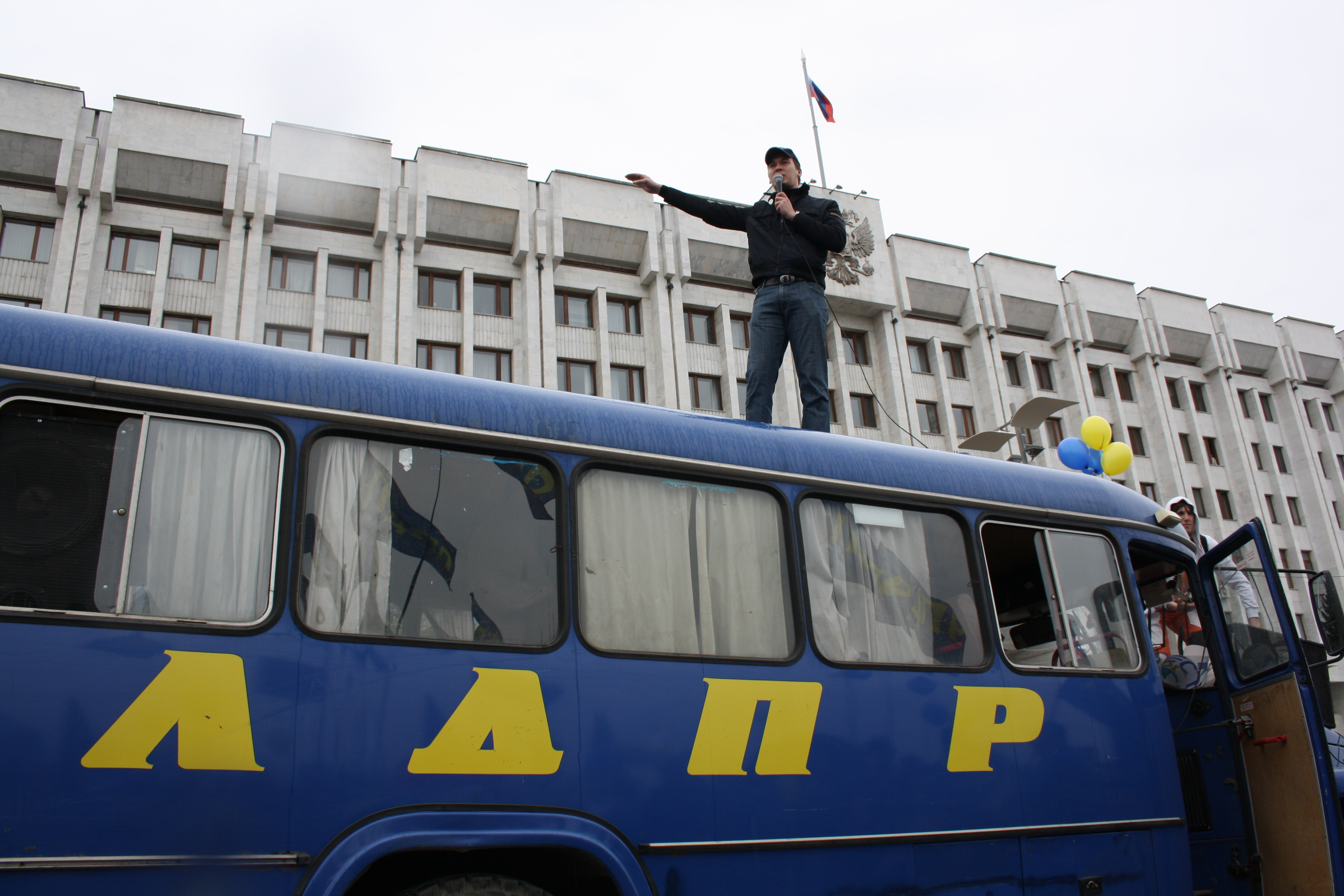
LDPR meeting in front of the Oblast administration building

During the Soviet period, the high authority in the oblast was shared between three persons: The first secretary of the Samara CPSU Committee (who in reality had the biggest authority), the chairman of the oblast Soviet (legislative power), and the Chairman of the oblast Executive Committee (executive power). After the abolition of Article 6 of the Constitution of the USSR in March 1990, the CPSU lost its monopoly on power. The head of the Oblast administration, and eventually the governor was appointed/elected alongside elected regional parliament.

The Charter of Samara Oblast is the fundamental law of the oblast. The Legislative Assembly of Samara Oblast is the province's standing legislative (representative) body. The Legislative Assembly exercises its authority by passing laws, resolutions, and other legal acts and by supervising the implementation and observance of the laws and other legal acts passed by it. The highest executive body is the Oblast Government, which includes territorial executive bodies such as district administrations, committees, and commissions that facilitate development and run the day to day matters of the province. The Oblast administration supports the activities of the Governor who is the highest official and acts as guarantor of the observance of the oblast Charter in accordance with the Constitution of Russia.

Governors:

- Konstantin Titov (1991–2007)
- Vladimir Artyakov (2007–2012)
- Nikolay Merkushkin (2012–2017)
- Dmitry Azarov (2017–2024)
- Vyacheslav Fedorishchev (2024–)

=== Legislature ===
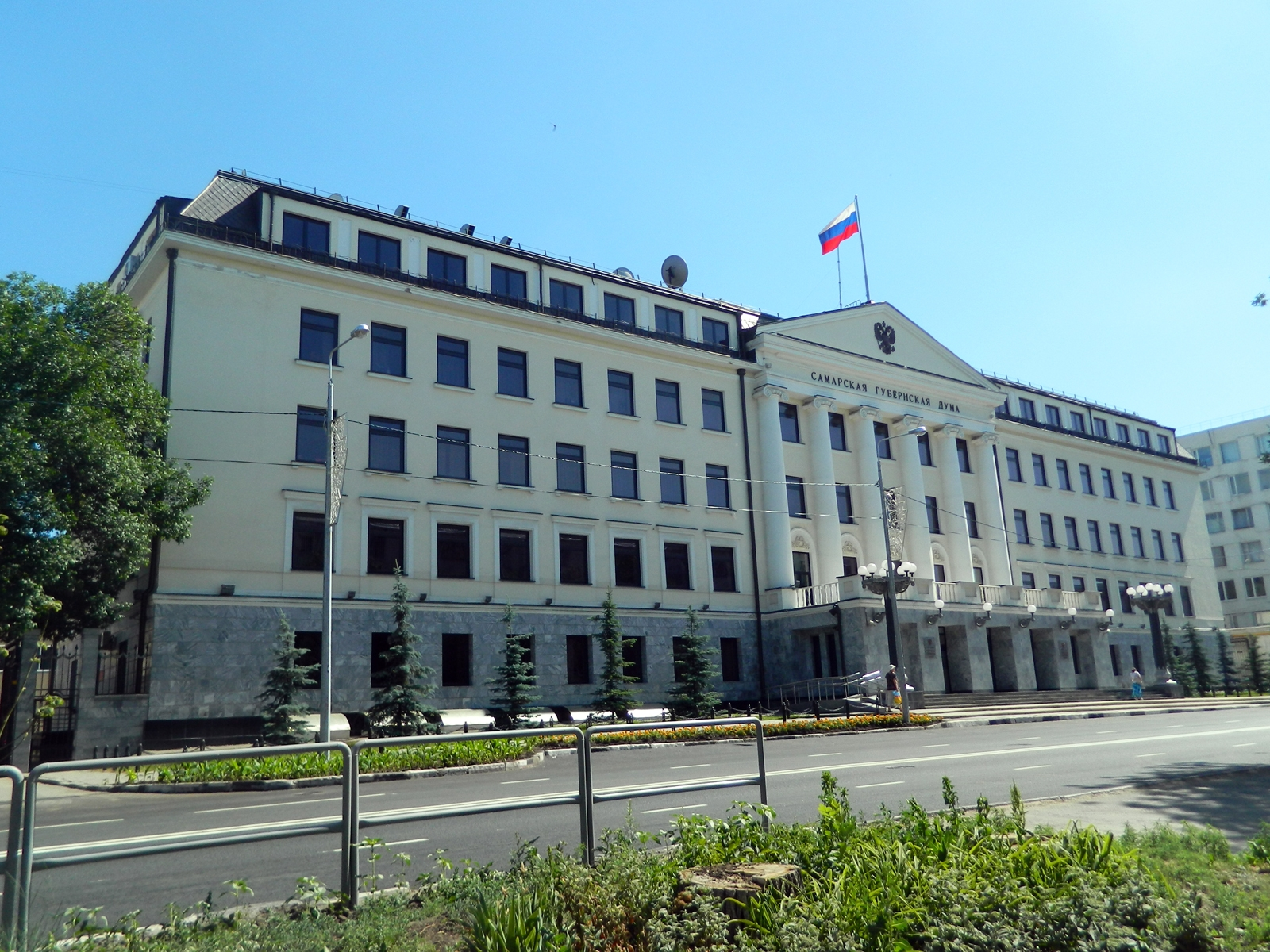
The building of the Samara Regional Duma in Samara.

The current 7th convocation was elected in September 2021 until 2026. All 50 deputies were elected from parties: 36 from United Russia, 10 from the Communist Party of the Russian Federation, 2 from A Just Russia - For Truth, 1 from the Liberal Democratic Party of Russia, 1 from New People. Gennady Kotelnikov (United Russia) was elected chairman of the Duma.

Andrey Kislov (United Russia) was elected as the representative of the Samara provincial Duma in the Federation Council until 2026.

=== Executive ===
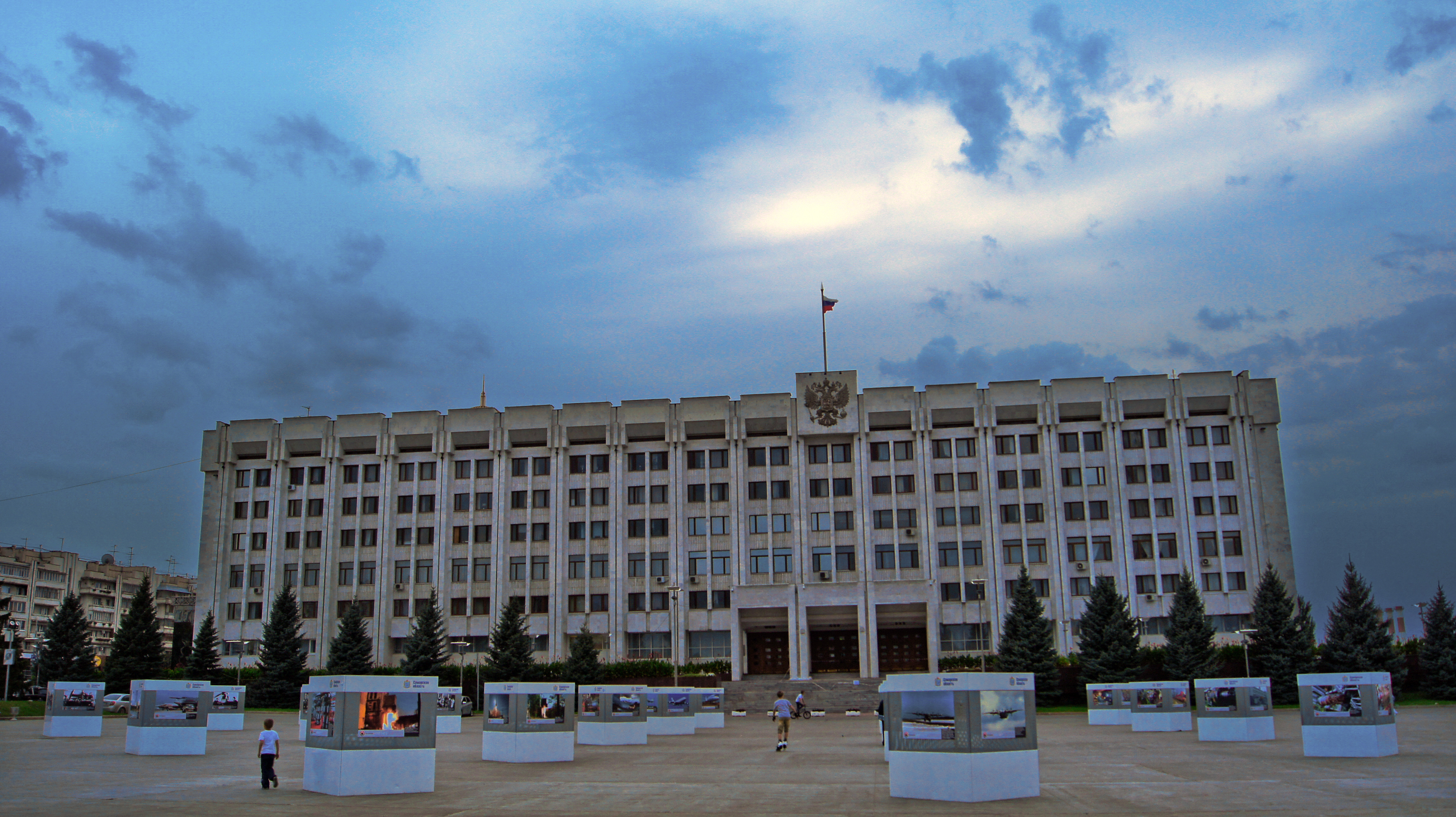
The building of the government and administration of the governor in Samara on the Square of Glory

Since September 2017, the position of Governor of Samara Oblast has been held by Dmitry Azarov. On 25 September 2017, he was appointed acting governor by President Putin after the early resignation of Nikolay Merkushkin, and on 9 September 2018, he was elected by the United Russia party in early elections. Farit Mukhametshin has been appointed representative in the Federation Council of the Government of the Samara Region until 2023.

== Geography ==
The region is located in the southeastern part of the European territory of Russia, in the middle reaches of the Volga, on both sides of it. This is the fifth largest region of the Volga region — it occupies an area of 53.6 thousand km2, which is 0.31% of the territory of Russia. The region stretches from north to south for 335 km, and from west to east for 315 km. The southernmost point of the region lies on the border with Kazakhstan (51°47' s. w. and 50°47' v. d.), the northernmost point is on the border with the Republic of Tatarstan (54°41's. w. and 51°23' v. d.). The westernmost point lies on the border with the Ulyanovsk region (53°22' s. w. and 47°55' v. d.), and the extreme eastern one is on the border with the Orenburg region (54°20's. w. and 52°35' v. d.). Due to the proximity of the West Kazakhstan region of Kazakhstan, part of the Bolshechnigovsky district has the status of a border territory.

== Nature reserves and parks ==
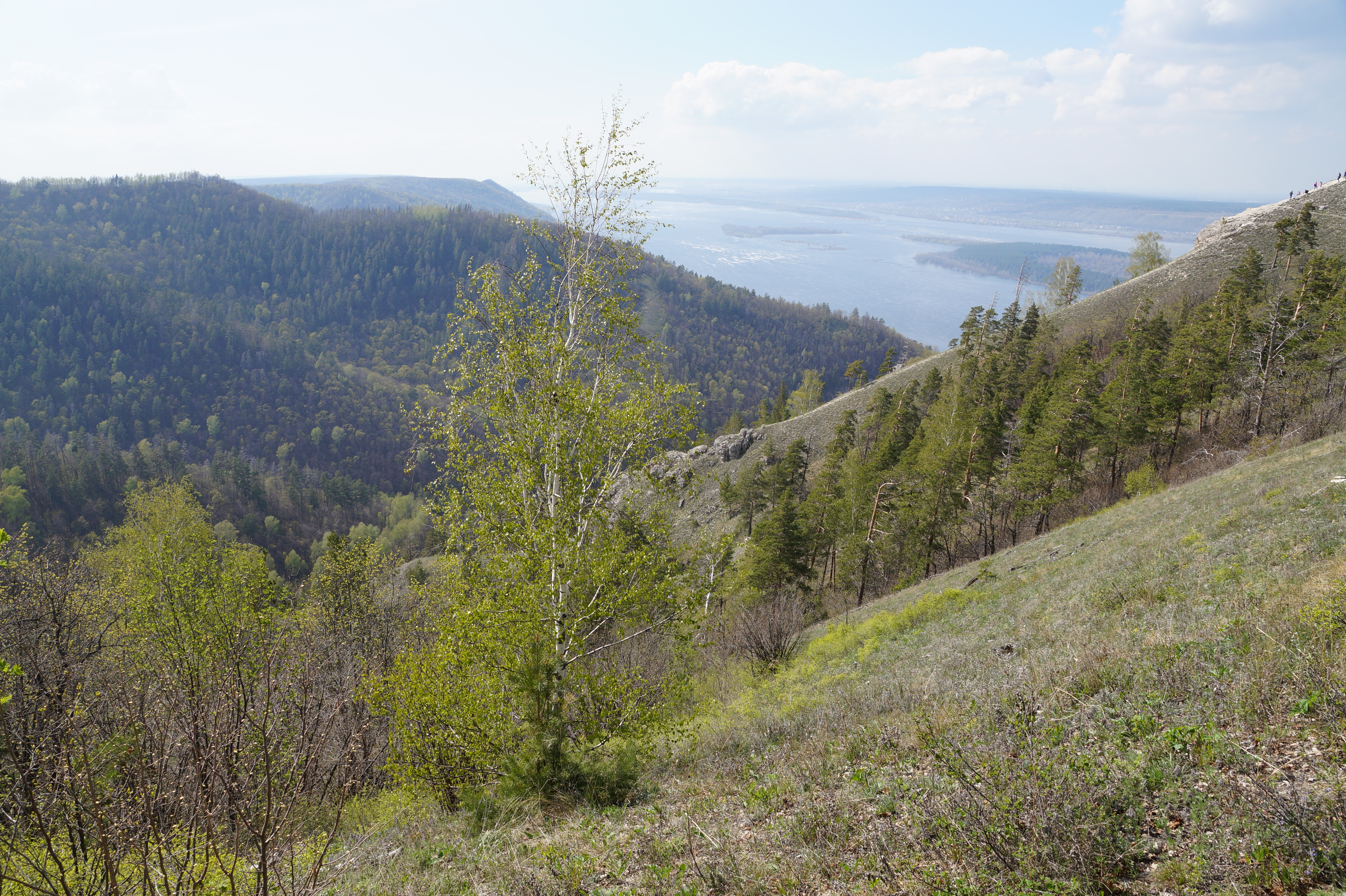
Zhiguli Nature Reserve. Samara region

At the end of 2012, there are protected areas of the following categories in the Samara region: state nature reserve, national parks, biosphere reserves, protected areas of regional importance, botanical gardens, therapeutic areas. At the moment, a unique network of various protected natural areas has been formed in the Samara region. It is based on protected areas of federal significance: the I. I. Sprygin Zhiguli State Nature Reserve (23,157 thousand hectares) and the Samarskaya Luka National Park (127,186 thousand hectares).

General forest cover of the region:

1696	1763	1868	1887	1914	1970	1988
33,6 %	29 %	25,3 %	20,5 %	17,8 %	12,4 %	12,5 %

The Sergievsky Mineral Waters resort area operates on the basis of the Sernovodsk mineral spring.

== Sister relations ==
- Győr-Moson-Sopron County, Hungary
