= Samara Regional Duma =

Regional parliament of Samara Oblast, Russia

Samara Regional Duma Самарская губернская дума
- 7th legislature

Type
- Type: Unicameral

Leadership
- Chairman: Gennady Kotelnikov, United Russia since 23 October 2018

Structure
- Seats: 50
- Political groups: United Russia (36) CPRF (10); SRZP (2); LDPR (1) New People (1)

Elections
- Voting system: Mixed
- Last election: 19 September 2021
- Next election: 2026

Meeting place
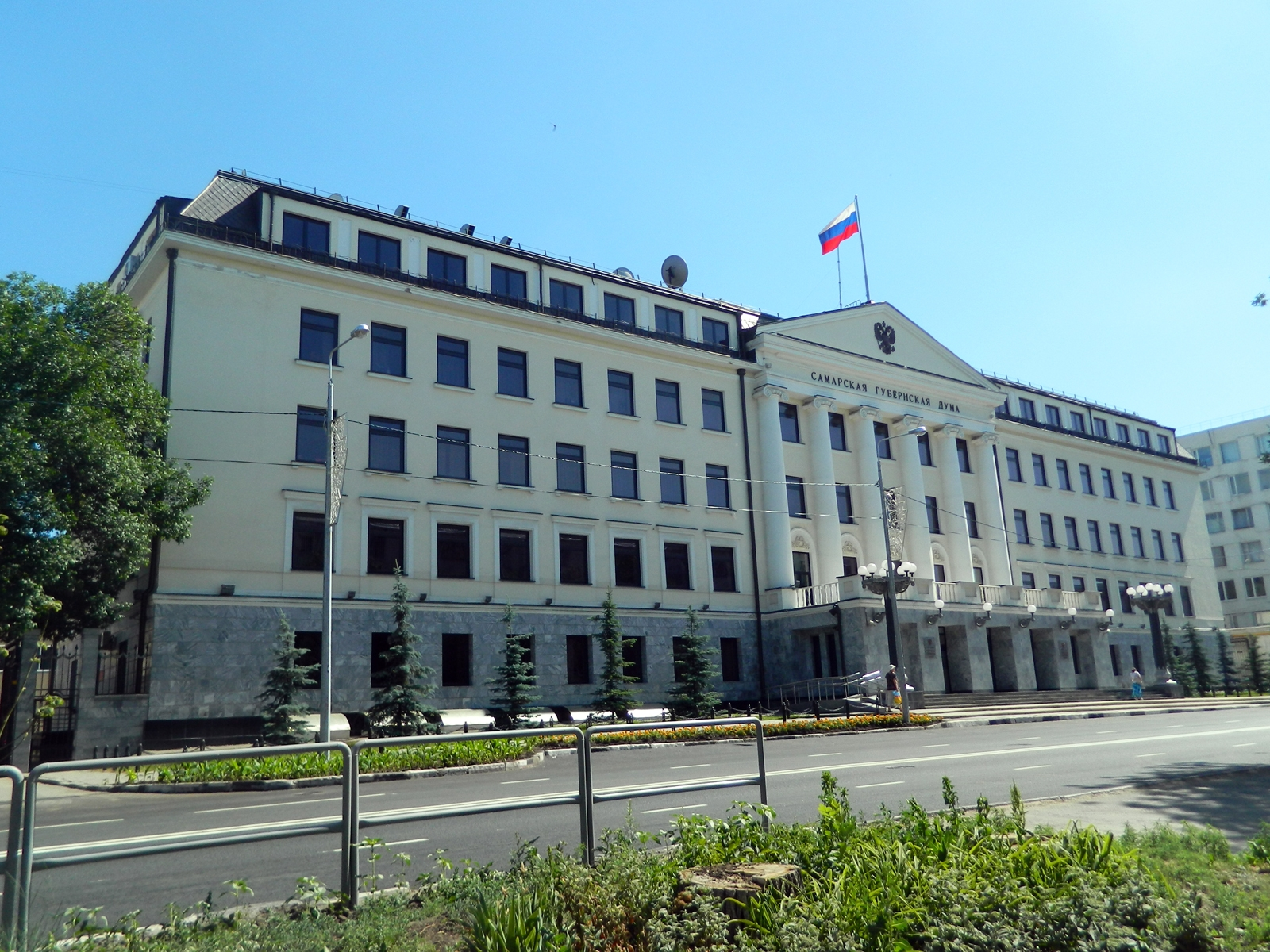
- 187 Molodogvardeyskaya Street, Samara

Website
- samgd.ru

The Samara Regional Duma (Russian: Самарская губернская дума, romanized: Samarskaya gubernskaya duma) is the regional parliament of Samara Oblast, a federal subject of Russia. A total of 50 deputies are elected for five-year terms.

== Elections ==
=== 2007 ===
| Party | % | Seats |
|---|---|---|
| United Russia | 33.54 | 33 |
| Communist Party of the Russian Federation | 18.98 | 7 |
| A Just Russia | 15.14 | 4 |
| Liberal Democratic Party of Russia | 11.59 | 3 |
| Union of Right Forces | 8.11 | 2 |
| The Greens | 7.62 | 1 |

=== 2011 ===
| Party | % | Seats |
|---|---|---|
| United Russia | 40.27 | 34 |
| Communist Party of the Russian Federation | 22.57 | 8 |
| Liberal Democratic Party of Russia | 16.24 | 4 |
| A Just Russia | 13.01 | 4 |

=== 2016 ===
| Party | % | Seats |
|---|---|---|
| United Russia | 51.02 | 40 |
| Communist Party of the Russian Federation | 17.44 | 5 |
| Liberal Democratic Party of Russia | 14.48 | 3 |
| A Just Russia | 5.78 | 1 |
| Registered voters/turnout | 52.53 | |

=== 2021 ===
| Party | % | Seats |
|---|---|---|
| United Russia | 44.26 | 36 |
| Communist Party of the Russian Federation | 20.44 | 10 |
| Liberal Democratic Party of Russia | 7.65 | 1 |
| A Just Russia — For Truth | 6.32 | 2 |
| New People | 5.72 | 1 |
| Registered voters/turnout | 46.47 | |

== See also ==
- Samara City Duma
