= Mosfilmovskaya Street =

Street in Moscow, Russia

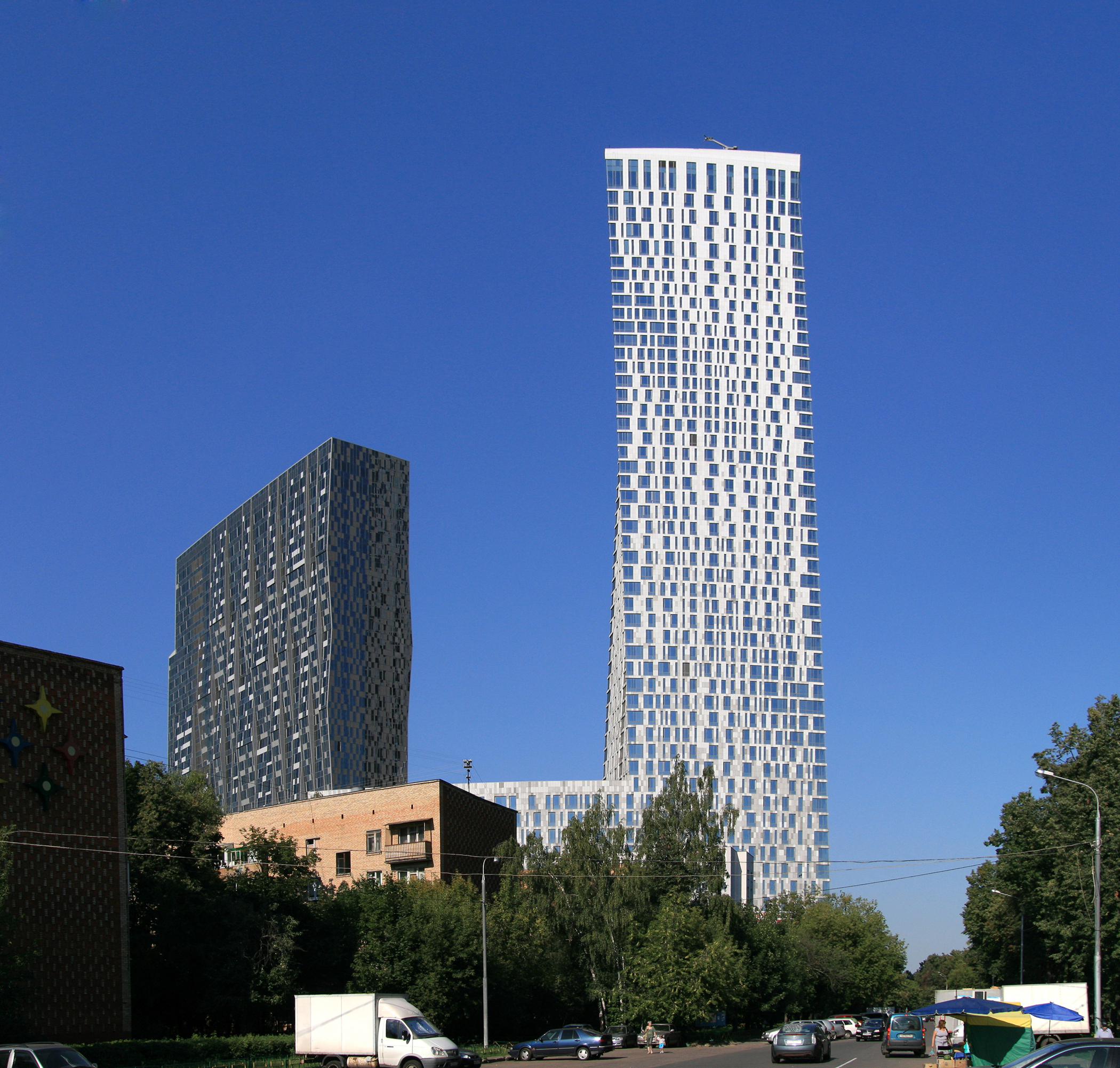
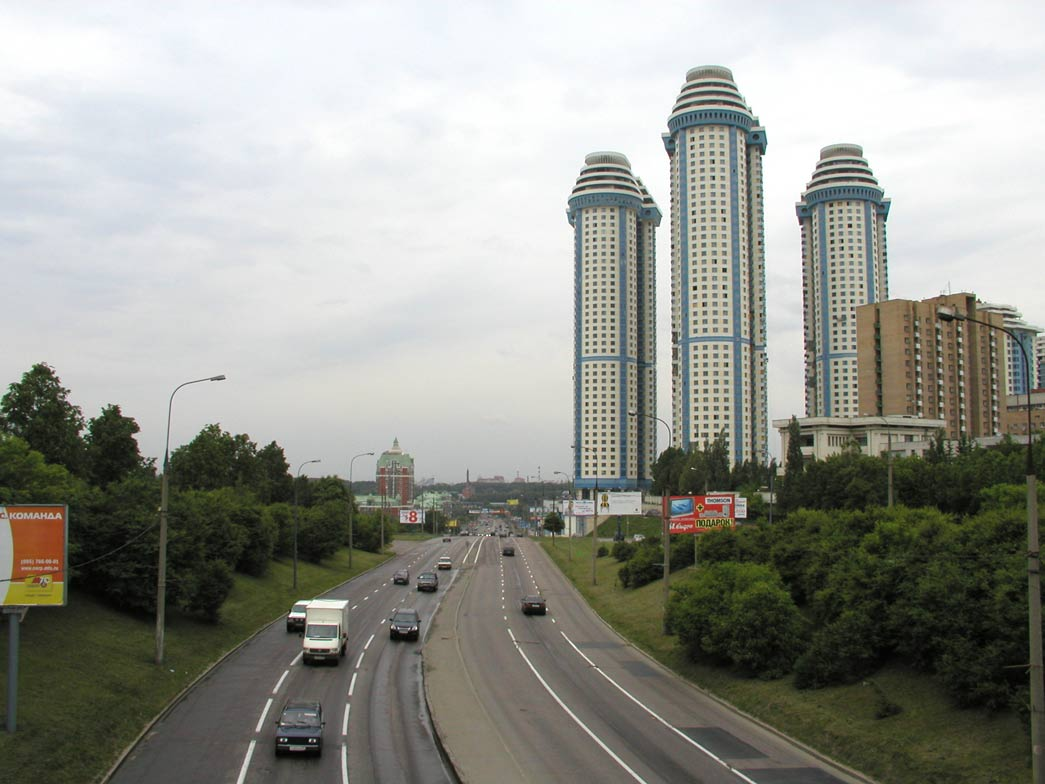
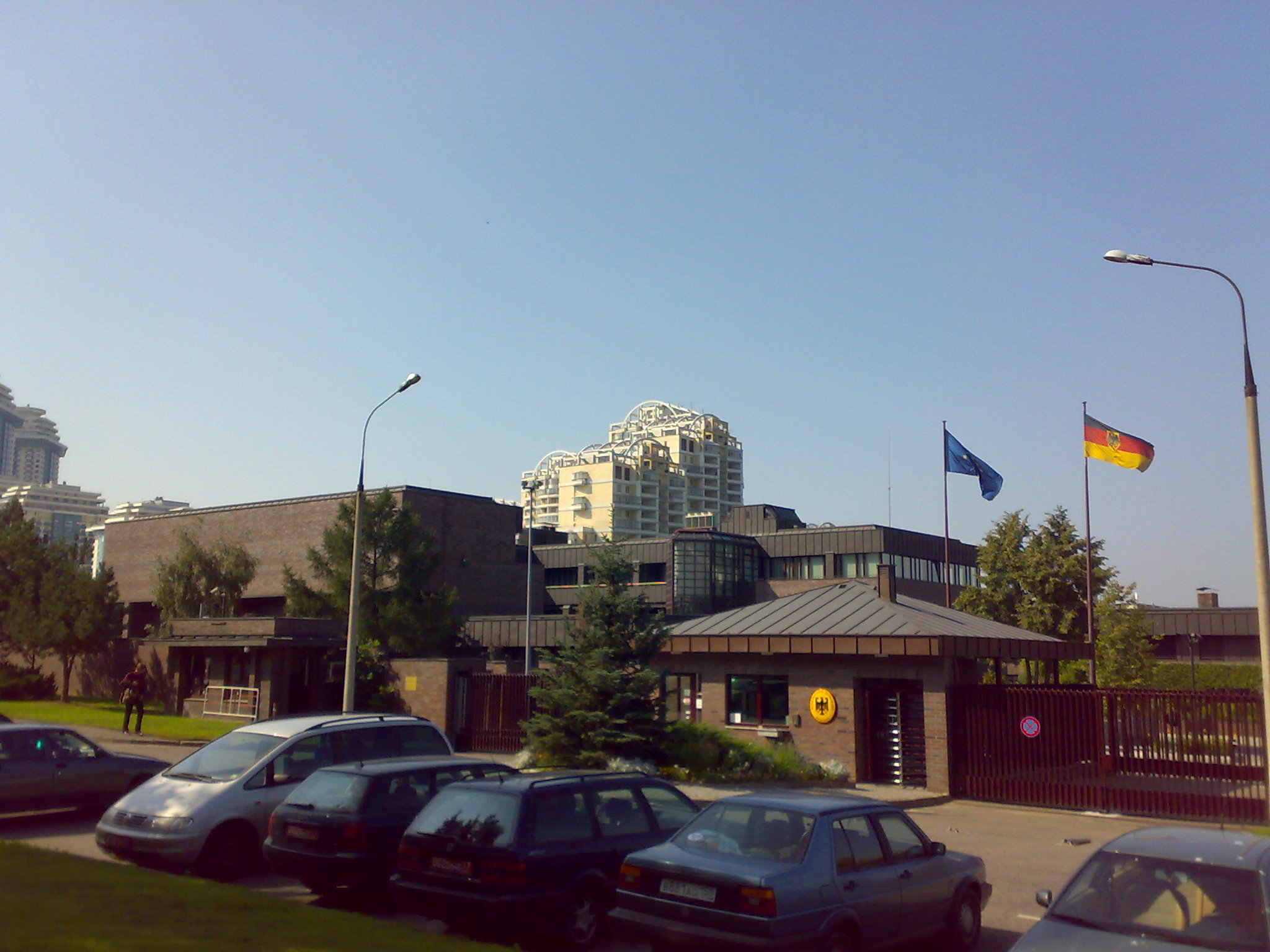
- Clockwise from top: House on Mosfilmovskaya, Embassy of Germany, Residential complex Sparrow Hills
- Native name: Мосфильмовская улица (Russian)
- Length: 3 km (1.9 mi)
- Location: Moscow; Western Administrative Okrug; Ramenki District
- Nearest metro station: Kiyevskaya; Kiyevskaya; Kiyevskaya; Universitet; Lomonosovsky Prospekt; Ramenki

Mosfilmovskaya Street (Russian: Мосфи́льмовская у́лица, romanised: Mosfílmovskaya úlitsa), formerly also Potylikha Street (Russian: Улица Поты́лиха), is a street in Ramenki District, West Administrative District, Moscow, where the Mosfilm Studios and many foreign embassies are located.

The name Mosfilmovskaya was officially adopted in 1939. Being outside the Garden Ring (Садовое Кольцо), which encircles central Moscow, the street runs south-west across a residential area between the Moskva (river) and its tributary Setun (river) (Сетунь). Moscow's Sparrow Hills (known as Lenin Hills during the Soviet era) are quite close here.

Around the 17th century the area was known as the estate of Troitskoye-Golenishchevo (another name being Golenishchevo-Kutuzovo), a country seat of the Kutuzov family, whose prominent descendant, Russian field marshal Mikhail Illarionovich Kutuzov (1745-1813) fought Napoleon I of France during Patriotic War of 1812. A major landmark surviving from that time is the Trinity Church (1644–45).

== Notable buildings ==
- 1 - Mosfilm Studios
- 18а — Holy Trinity Church
- 38 - People's Bureau of Libya
- 40 - All-Russia People's Front
- 44 - Embassy of Kuwait
- 46 - Embassy of Serbia
- 50 - Embassy of Malaysia
- 50 bld.1 - Embassy of Bosnia and Herzegovina
- 50 bld.1 - Embassy of Nicaragua
- 50 bld.1 - Embassy of Panama
- 56 - Embassy of Germany
- 60 - Embassy of Sweden
- 62 - Embassy of Hungary
- 64 - Embassy of Romania
- 66 - Embassy of Bulgaria
- 72 - Embassy of North Korea

The embassies of Angola and the United Arab Emirates are located nearby, in Ulofa Palme Street. The embassy of the People's Republic of China is located at 6 Druzhby Street, within a ten-minute walk from Mosfilmovskaya Street.

== Image gallery ==
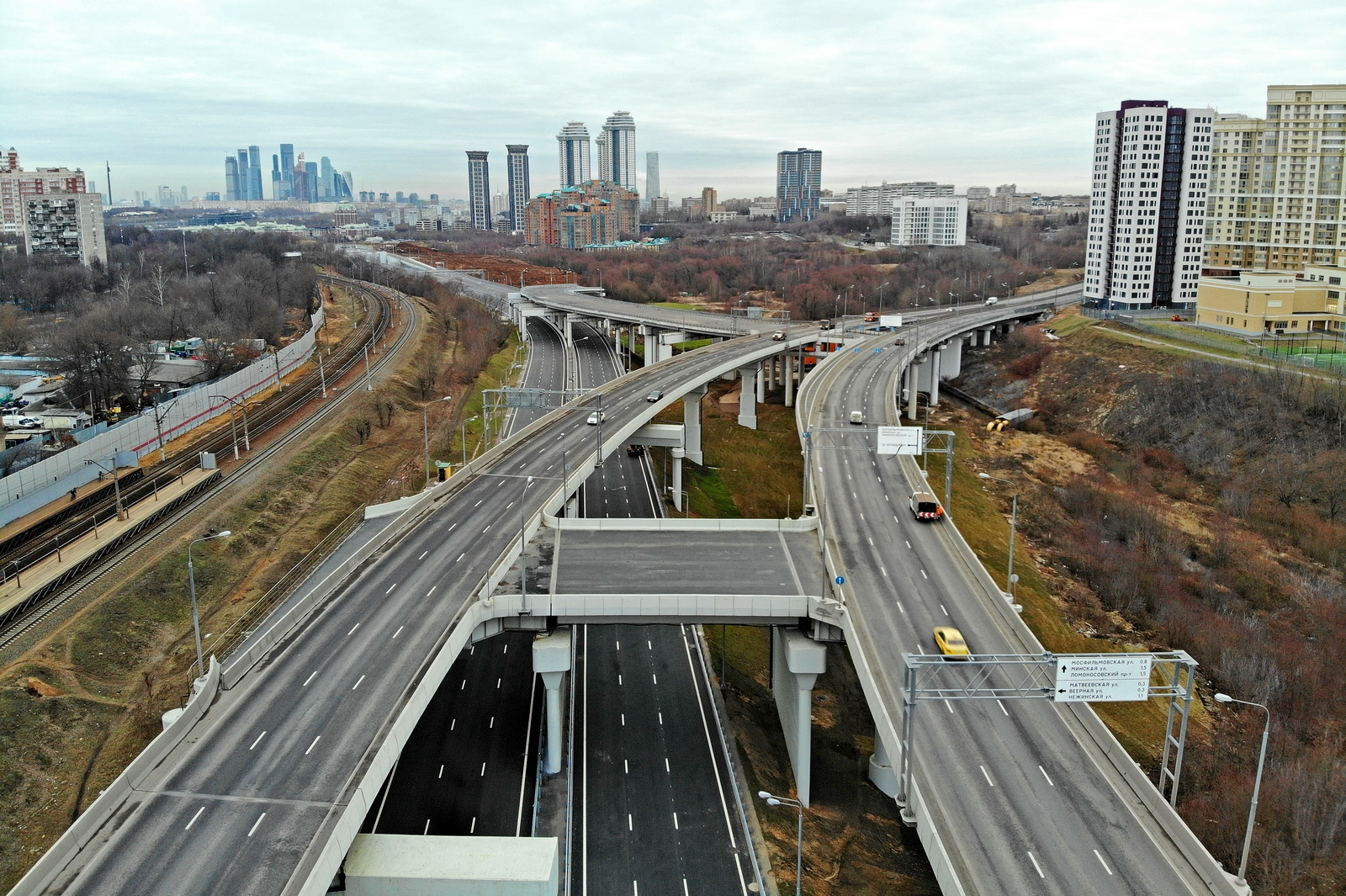
An interchange with Generala Dorokhova Avenue.

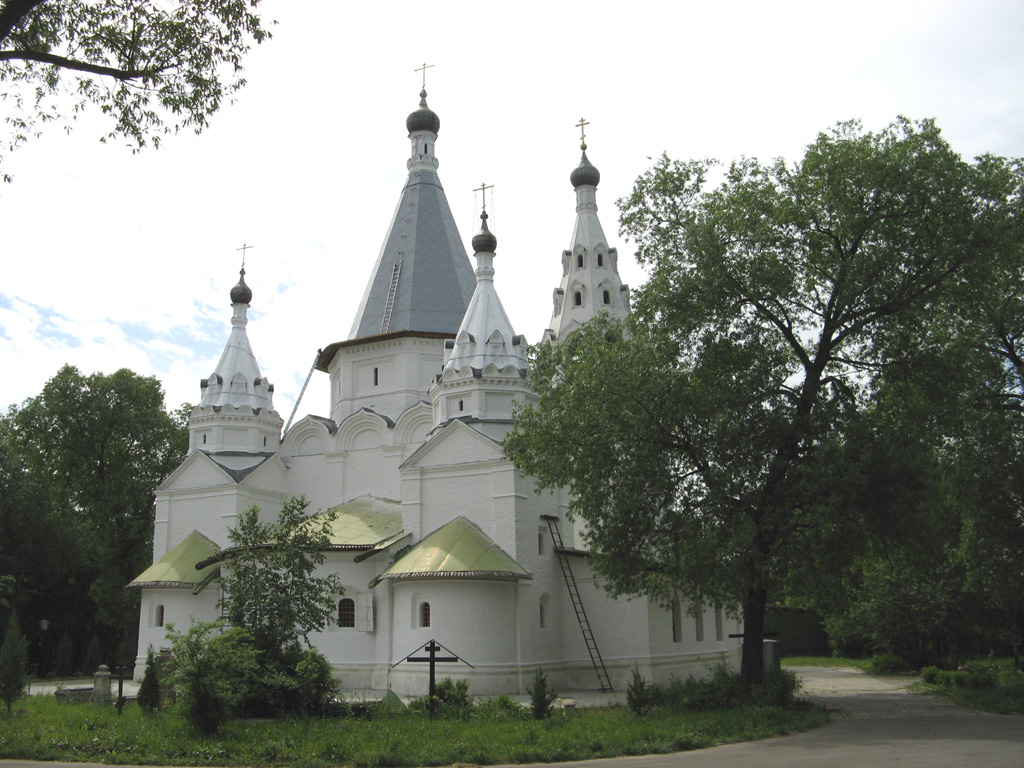
Holy Trinity Church.

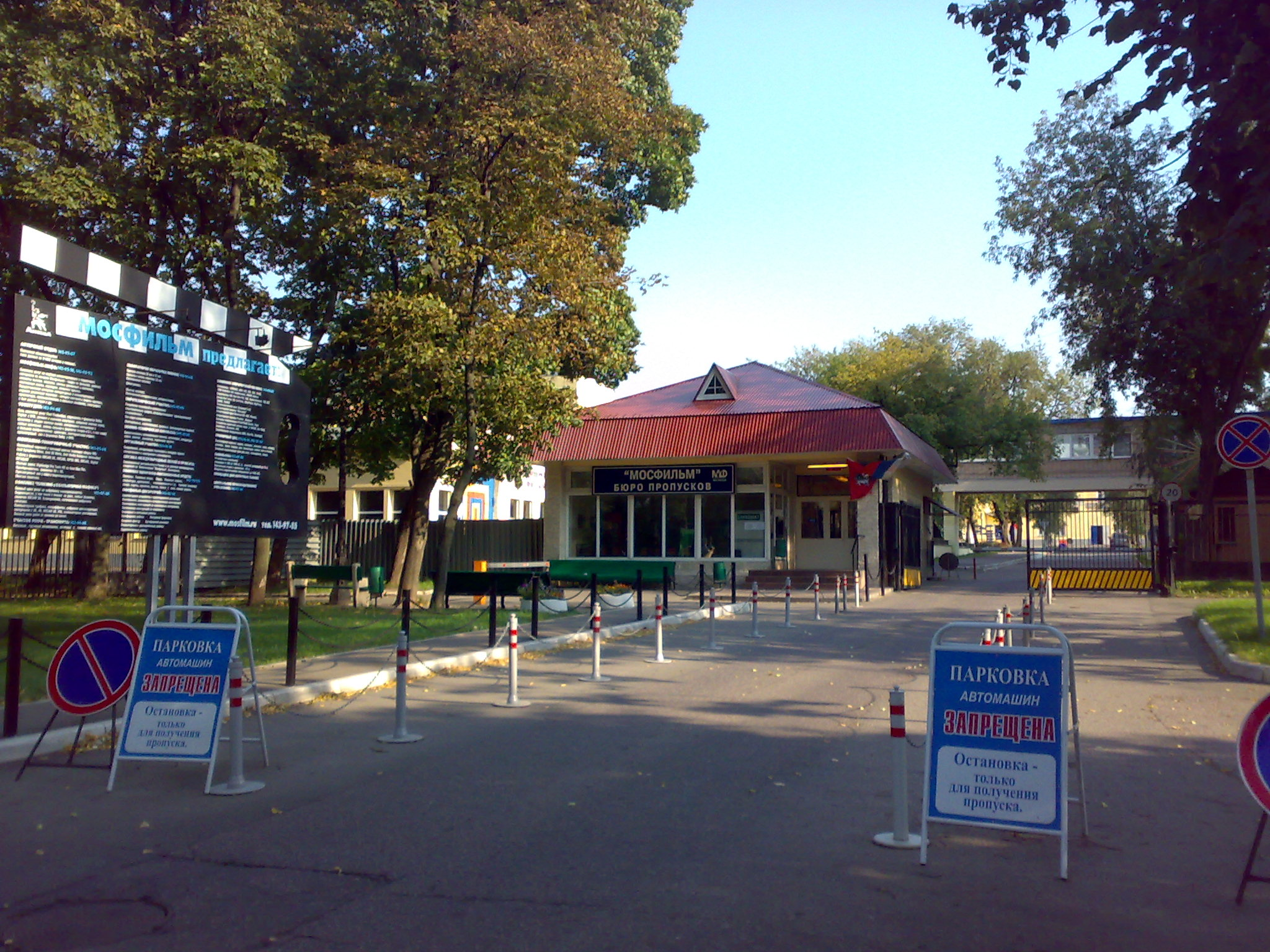
Entrance to Mosfilm Studios with a large clapperboard sign at left.

== Images of embassies ==
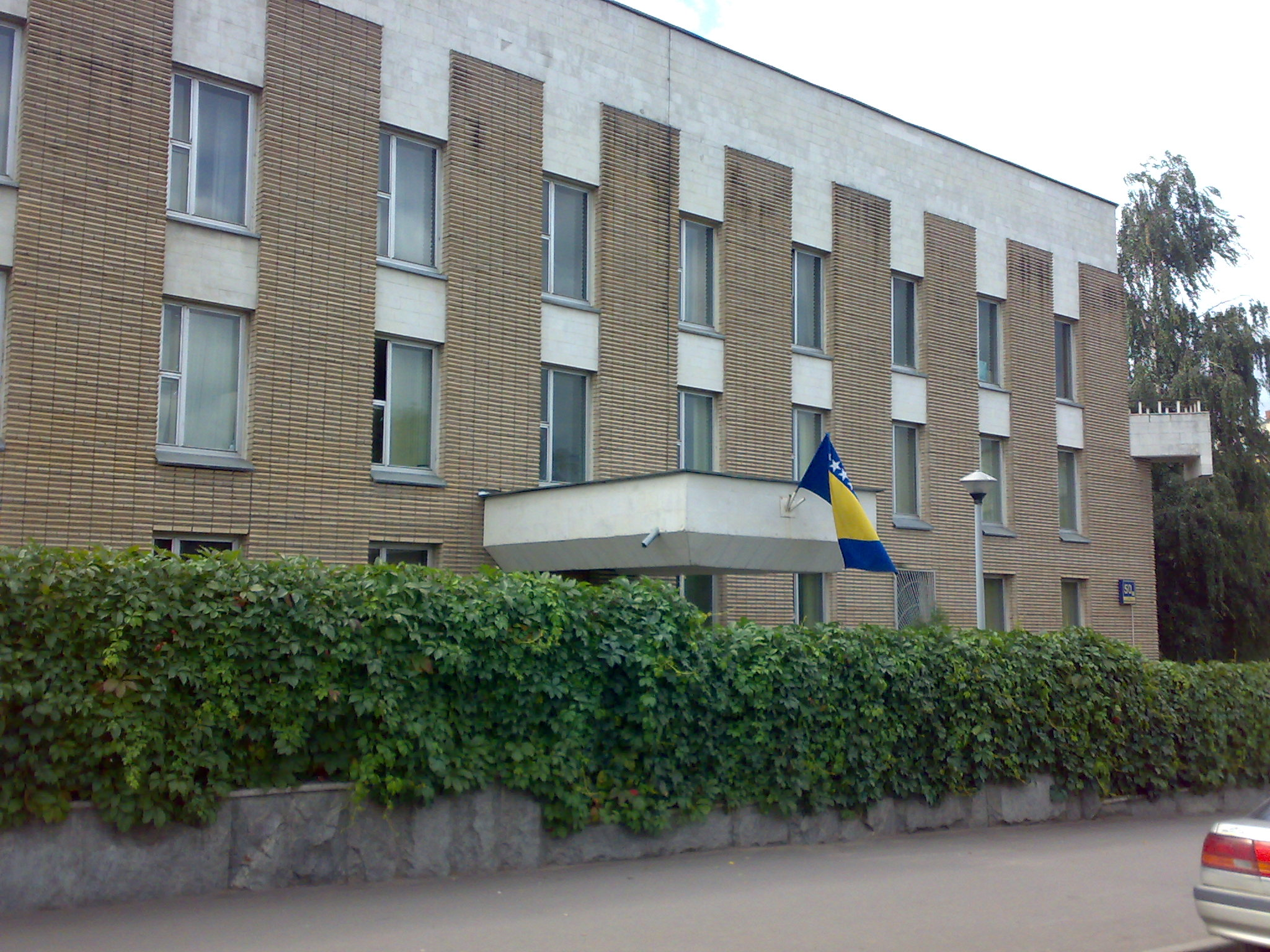
Embassy of Bosnia and Herzegovina

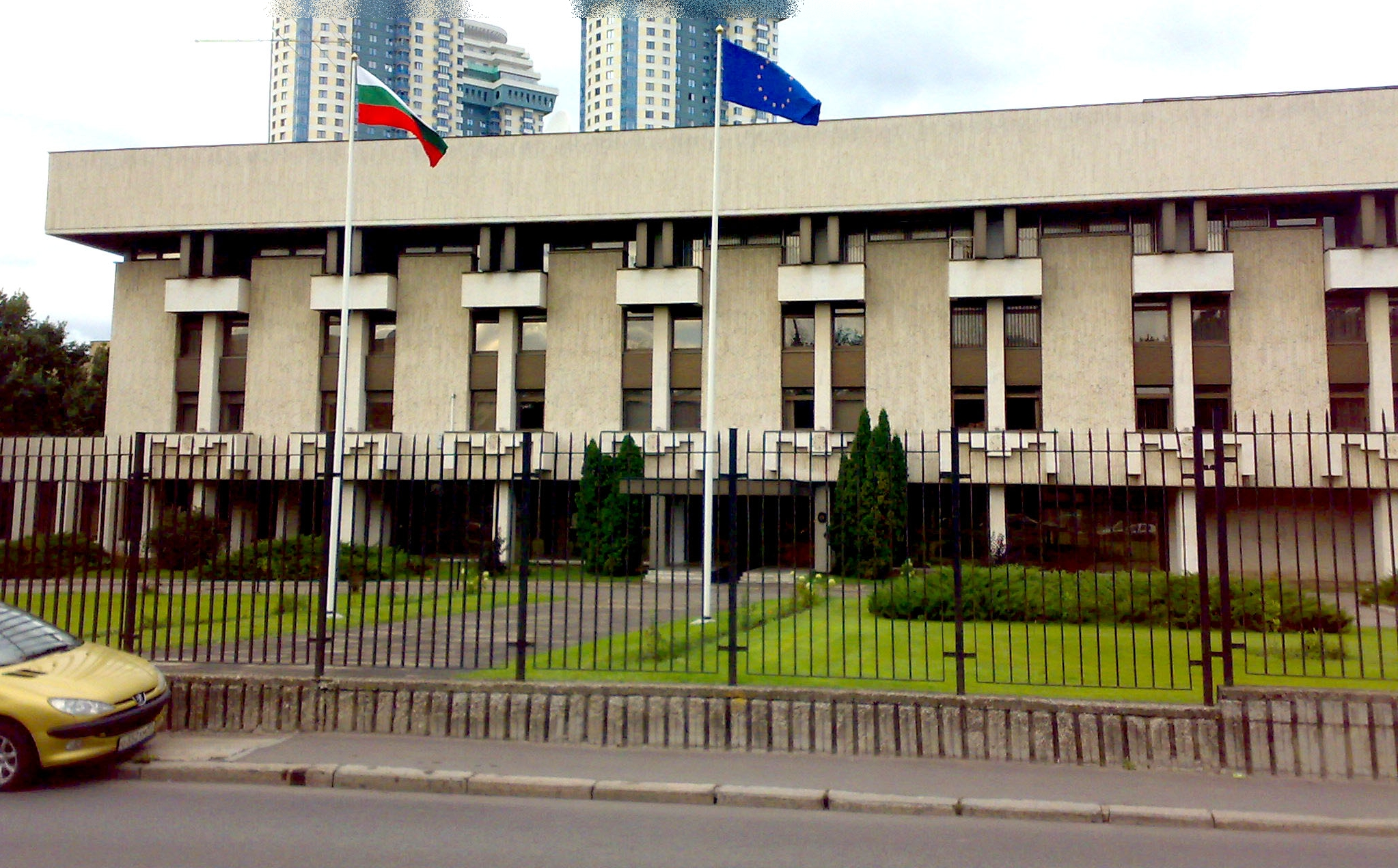
Embassy of Bulgaria

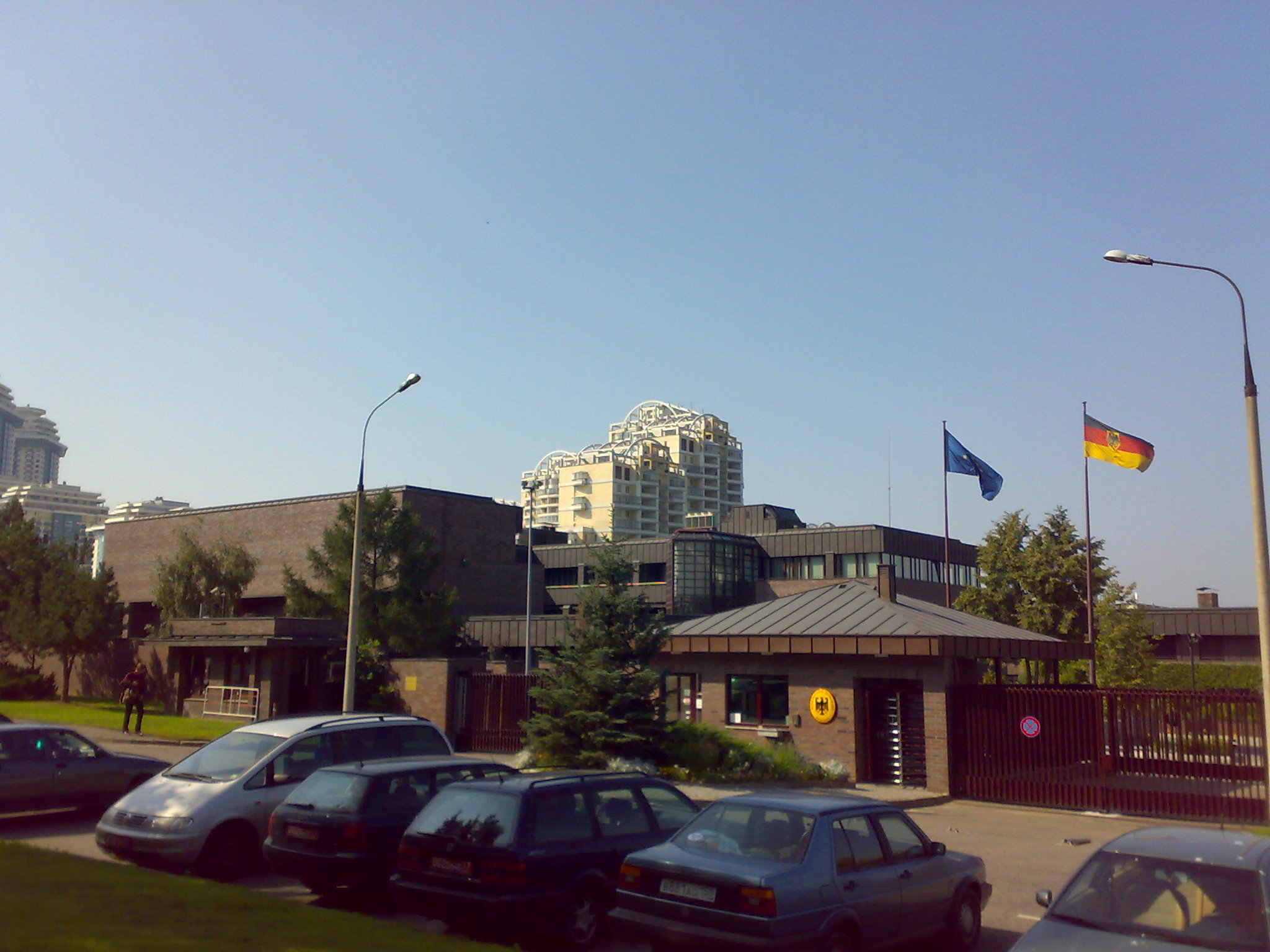
Embassy of Germany

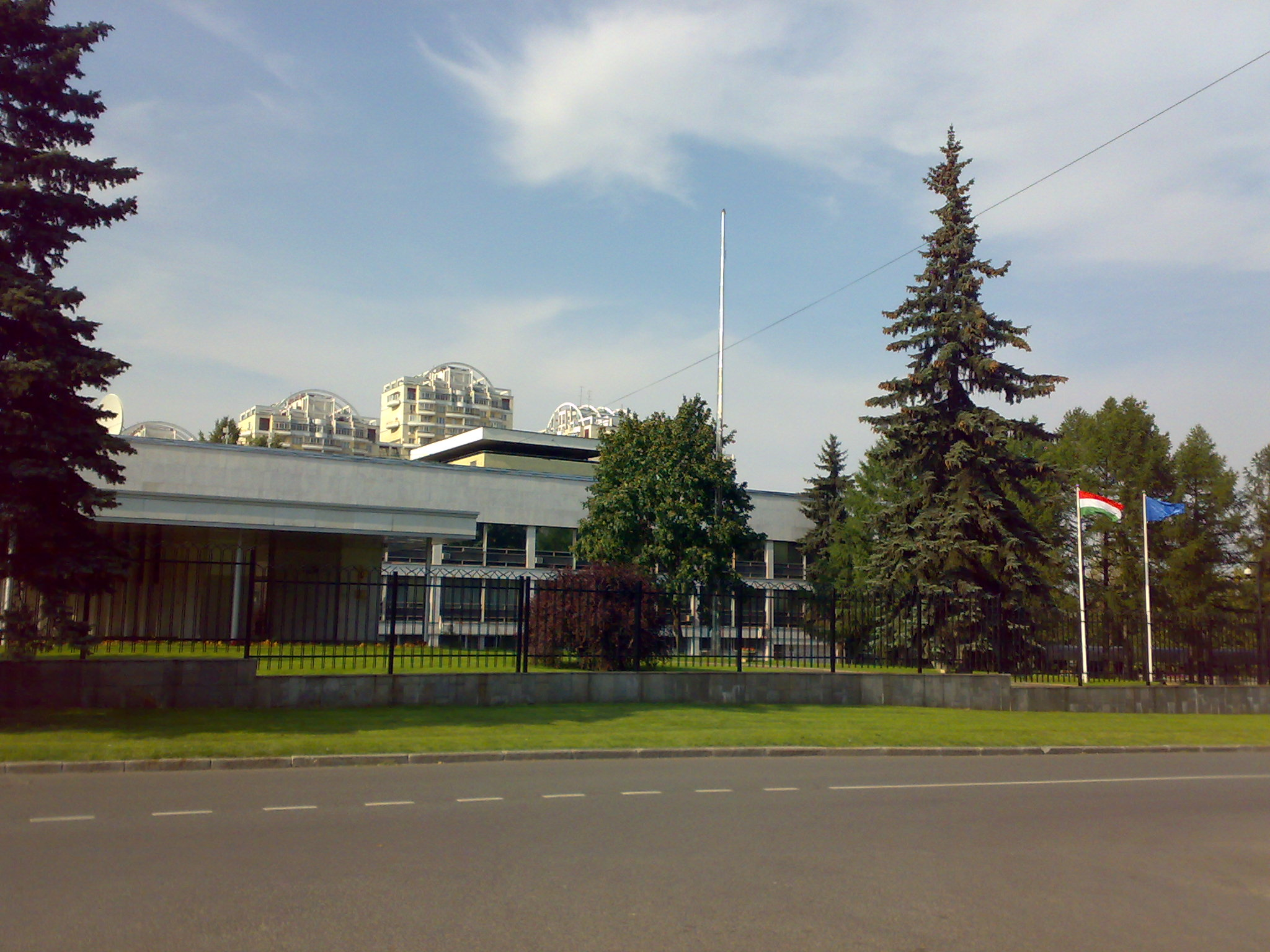
Embassy of Hungary

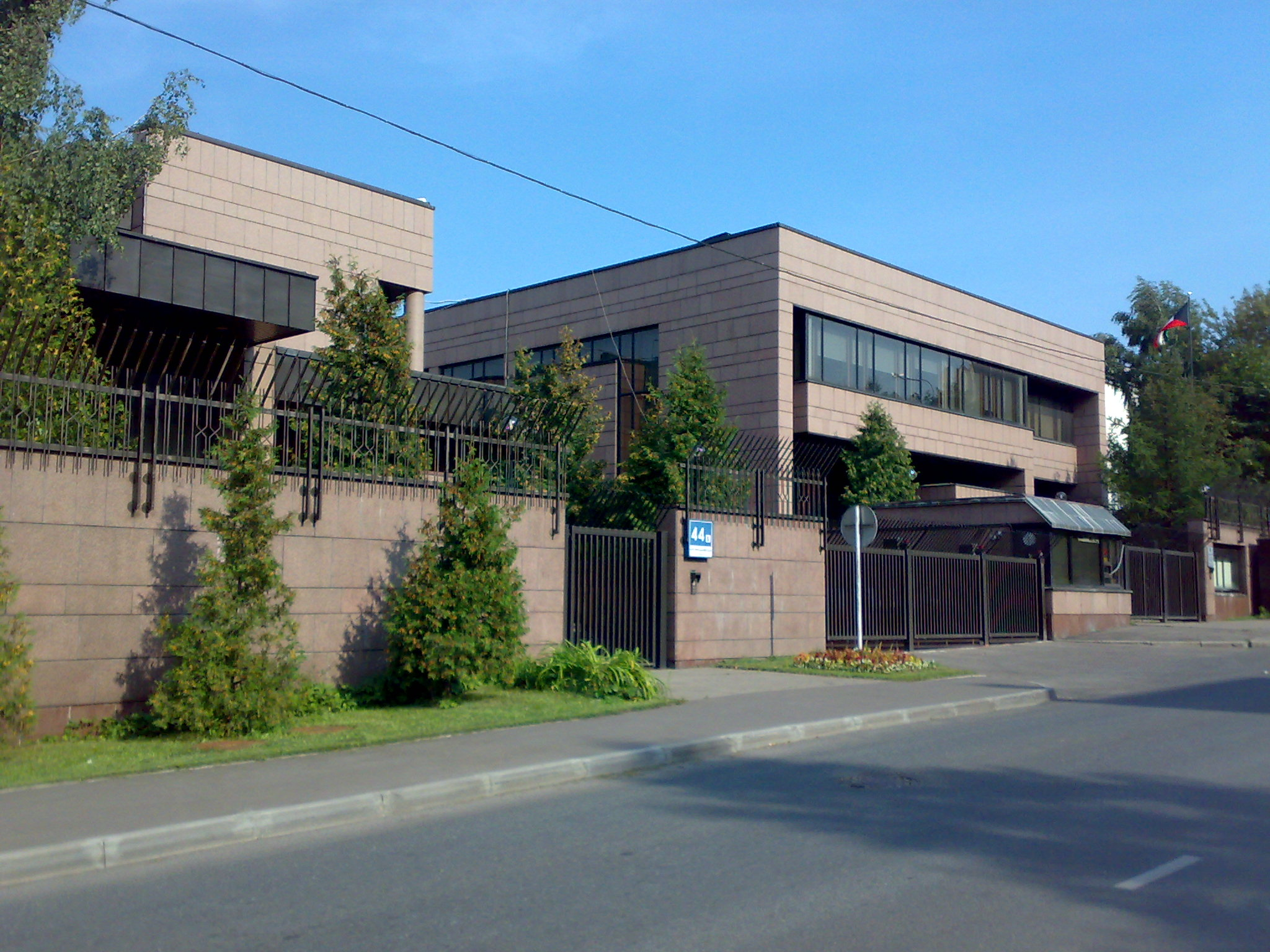
Embassy of Kuwait

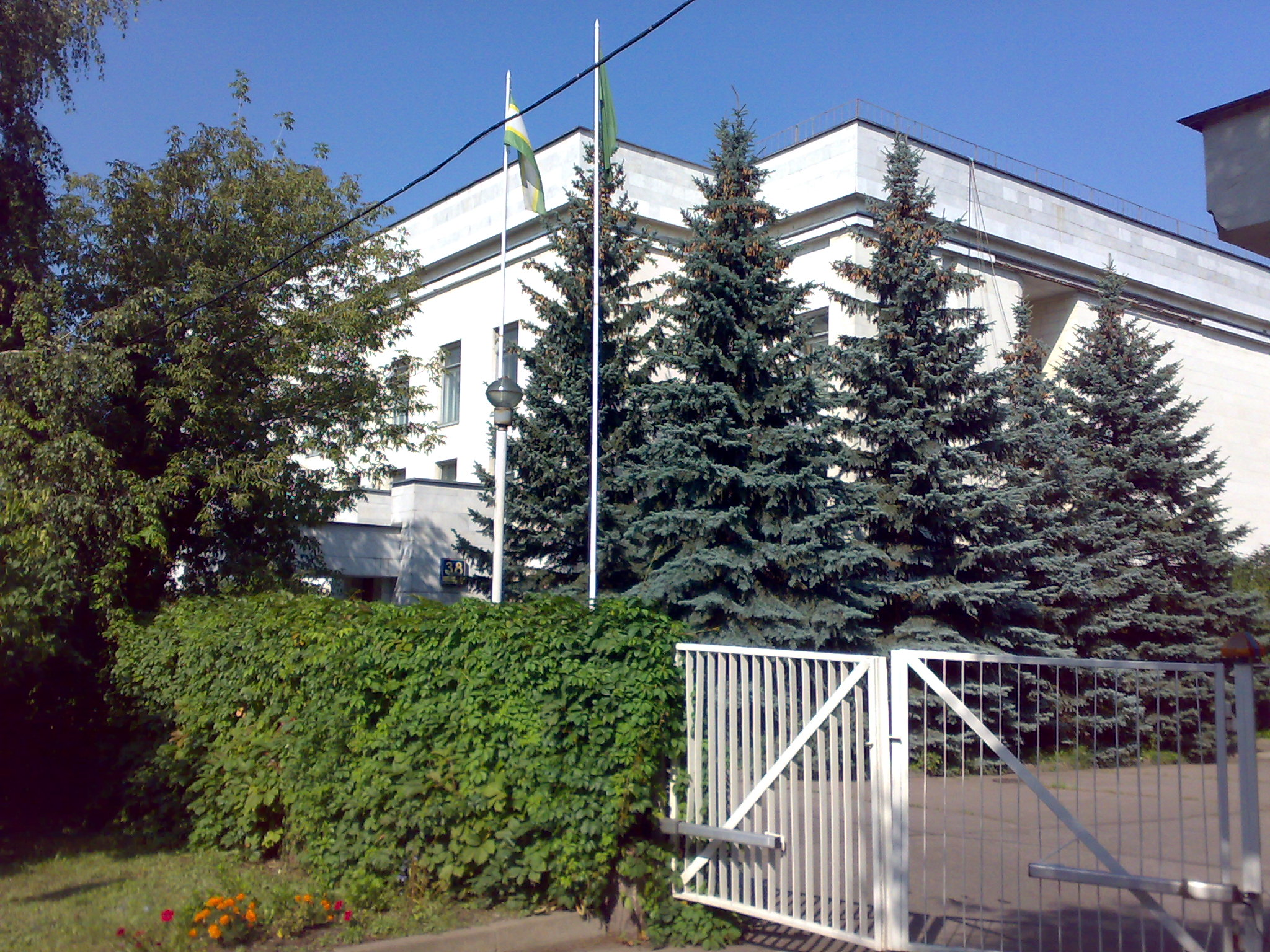
Embassy of Libya

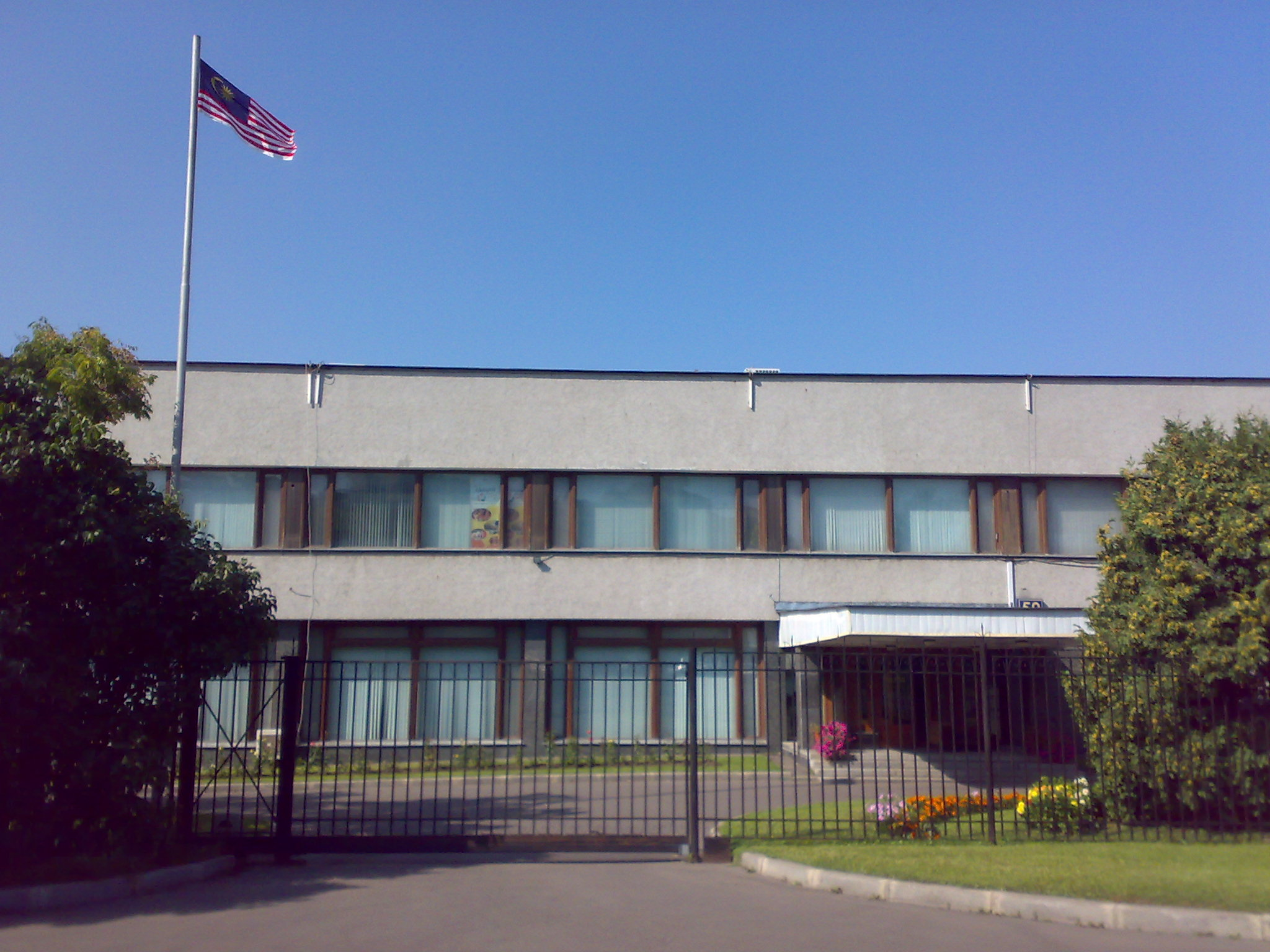
Embassy of Malaysia

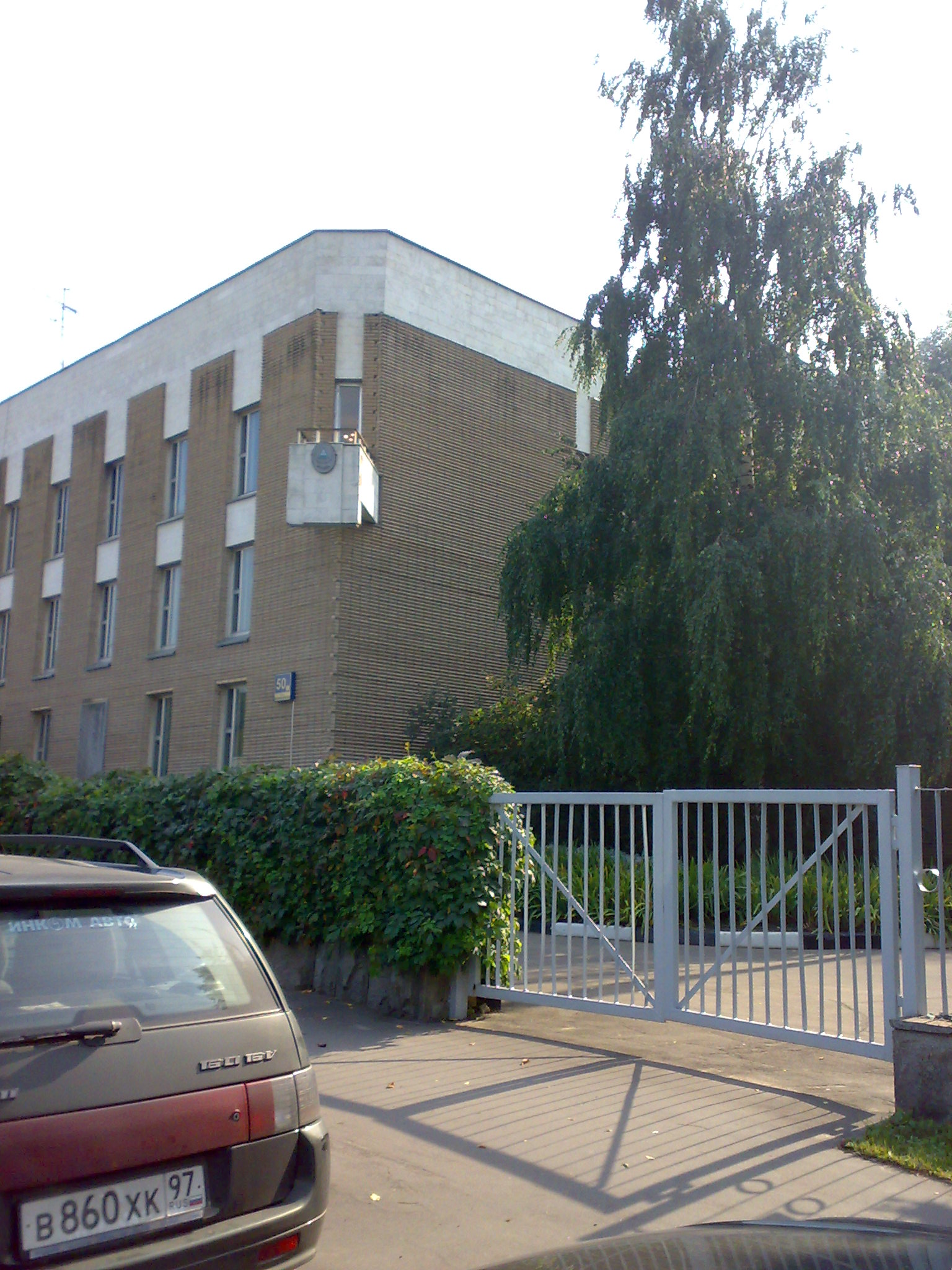
Embassy of Nicaragua

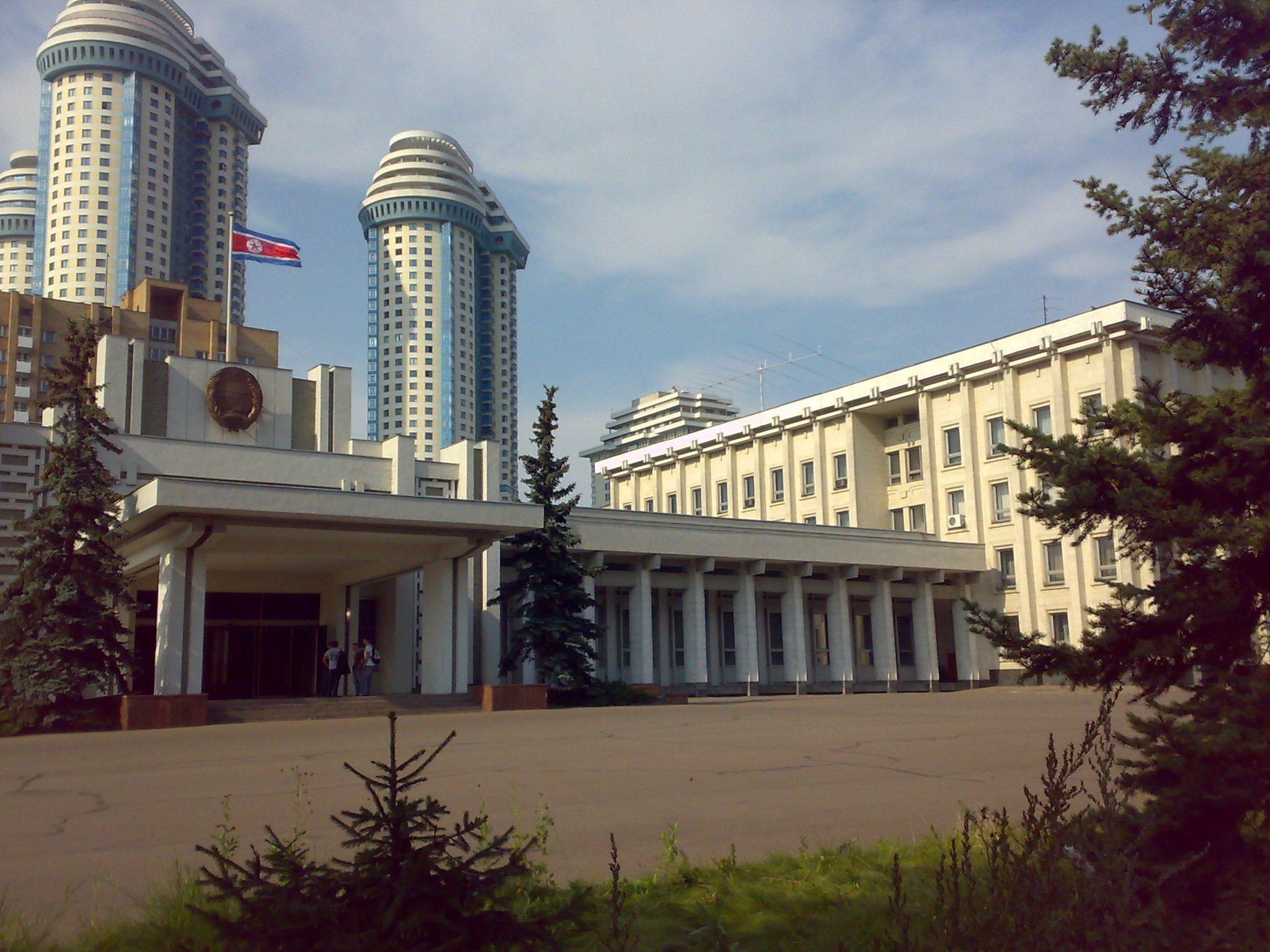
Embassy of North Korea

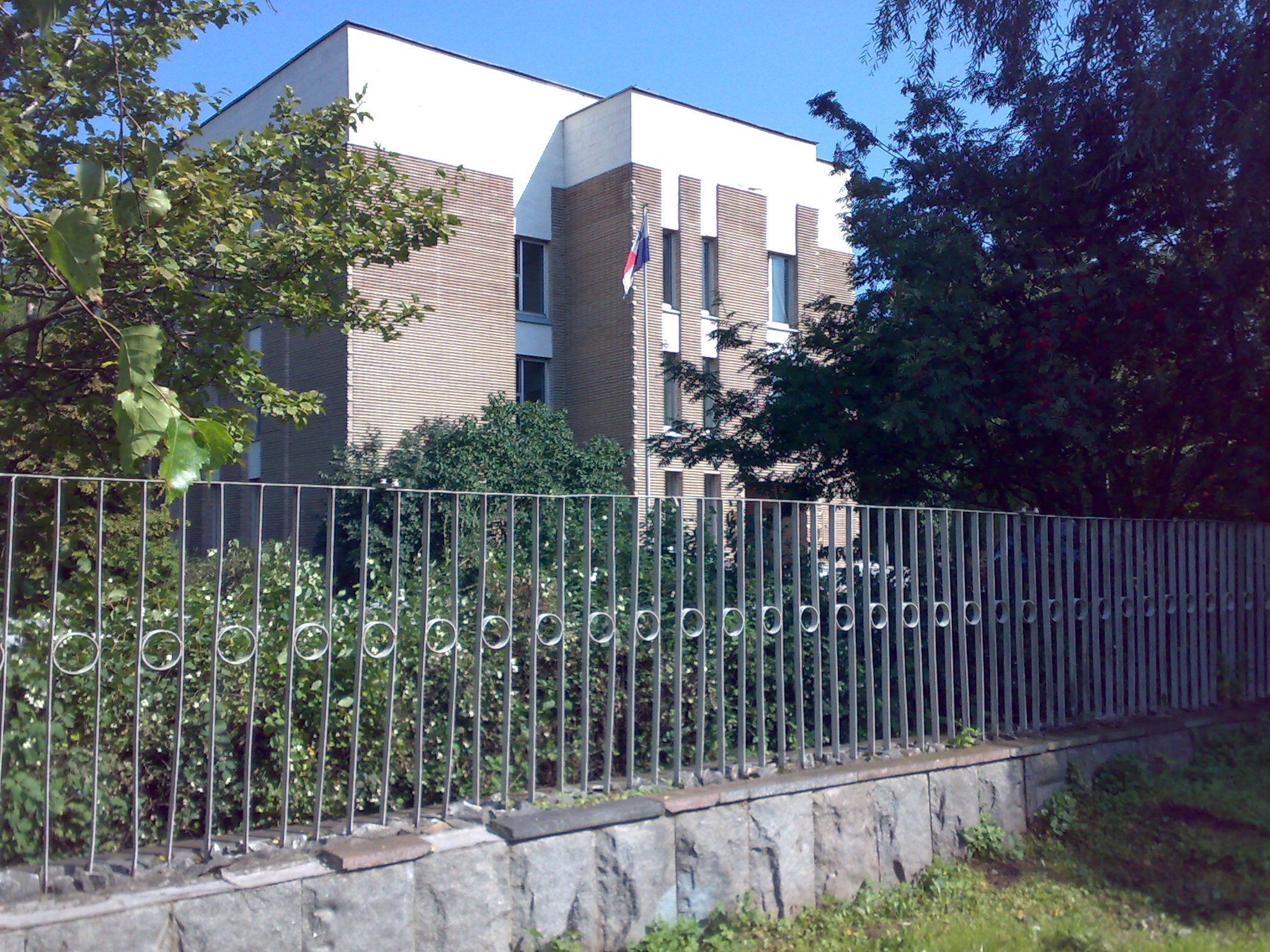
Embassy of Panama

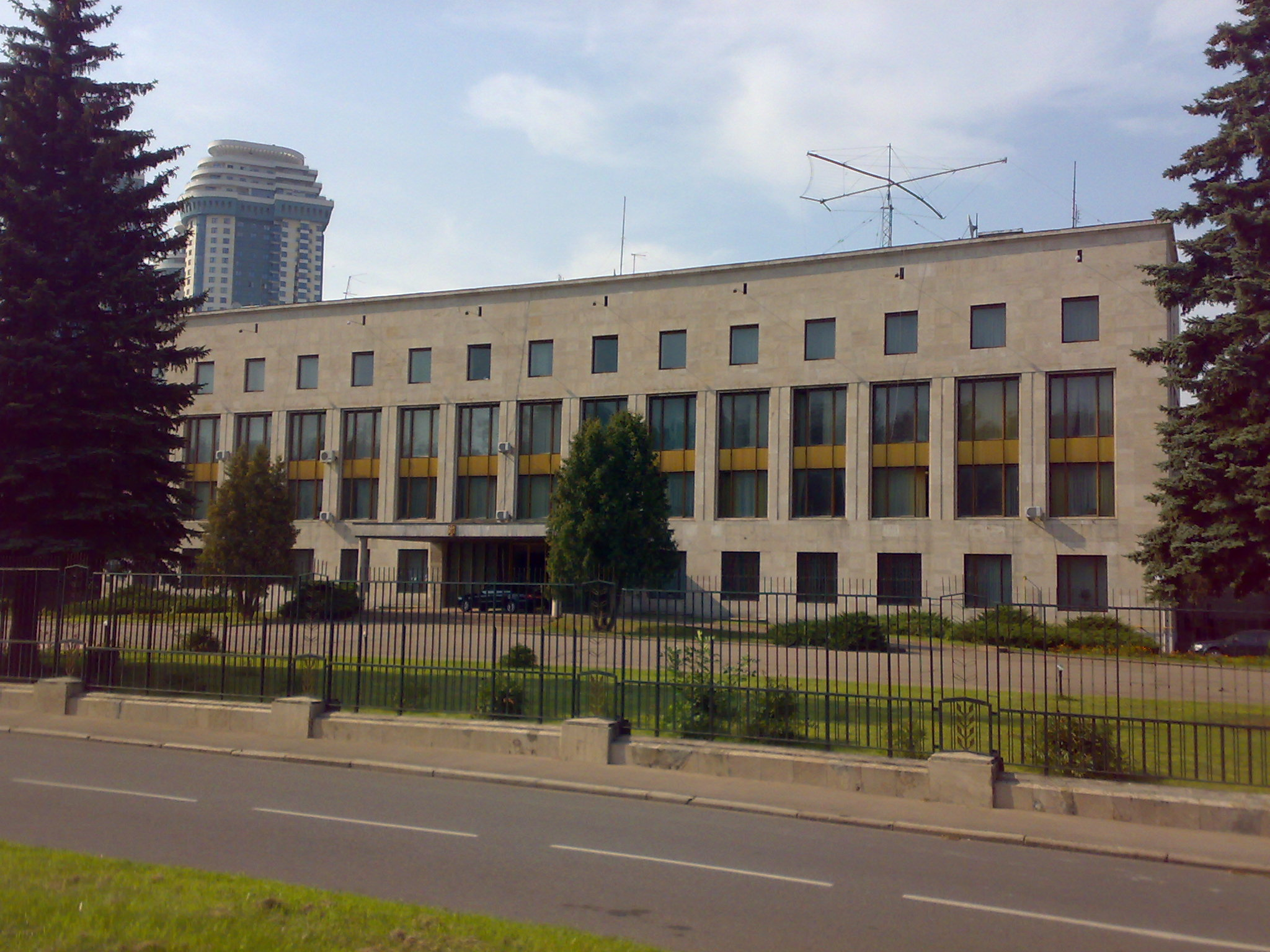
Embassy of Romania

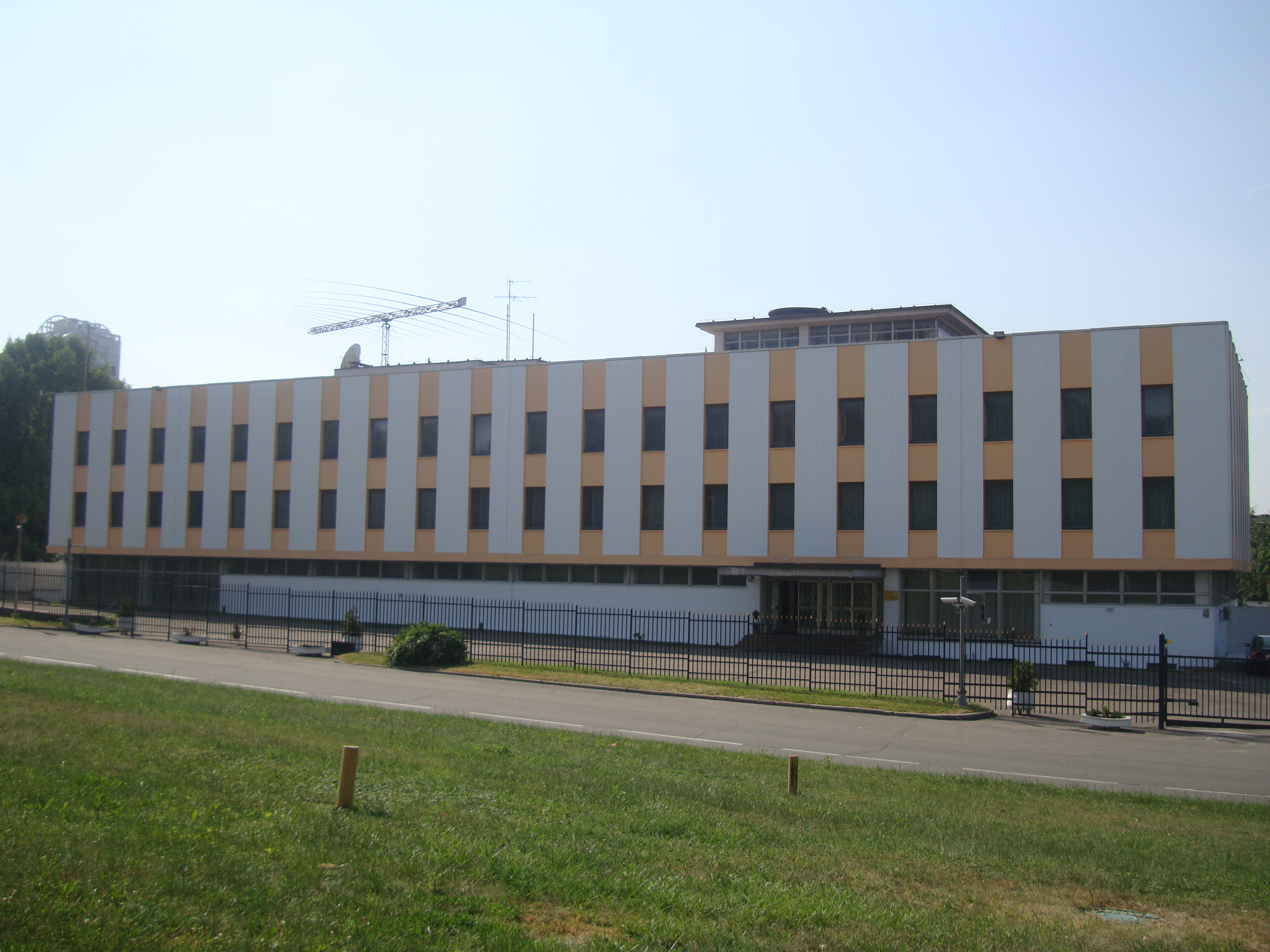
Embassy of Serbia

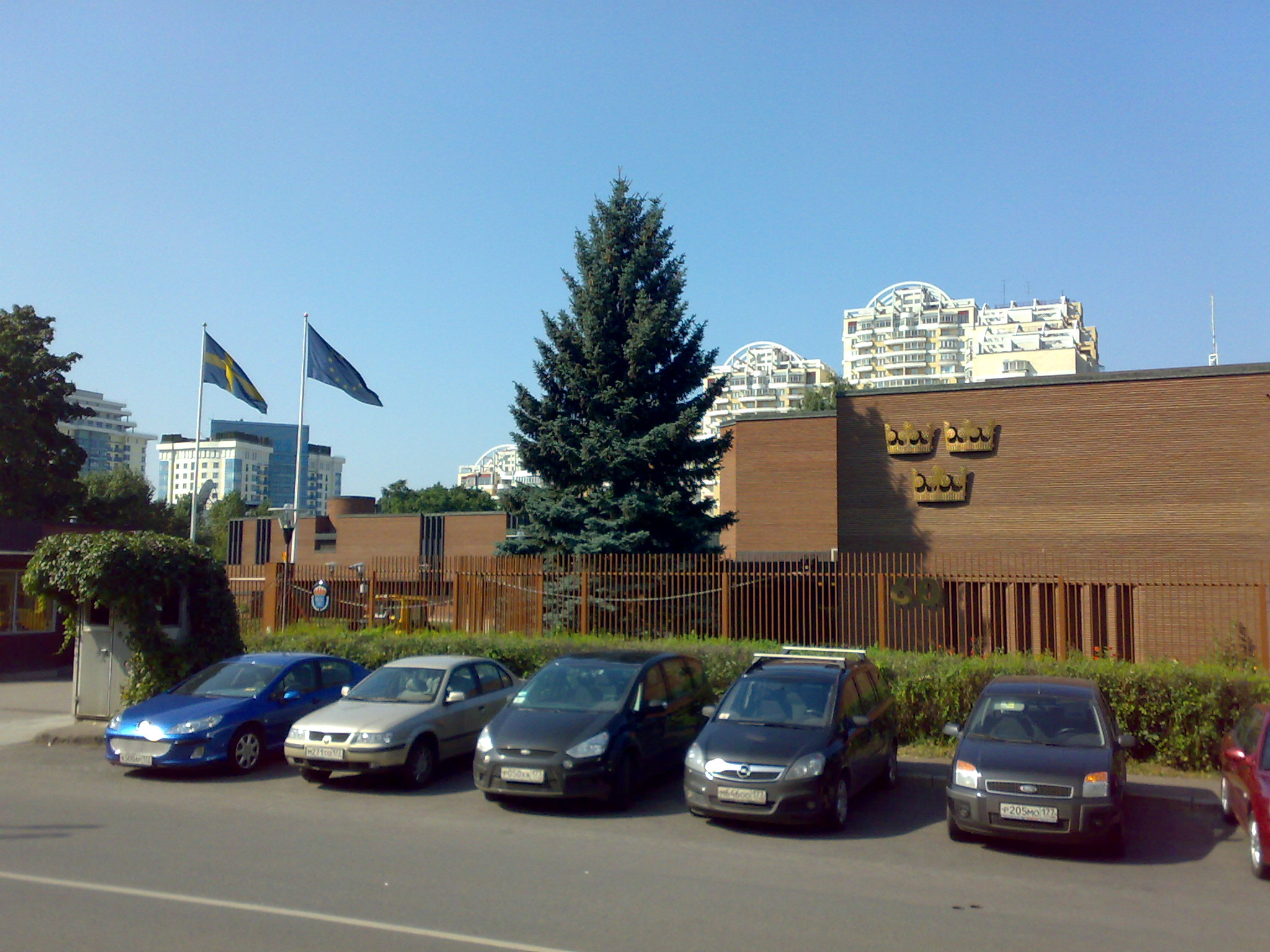
Embassy of Sweden
