= Ulofa Palme Street =

Street in Moscow

Coordinates: 55°43′5″N 37°30′50″E

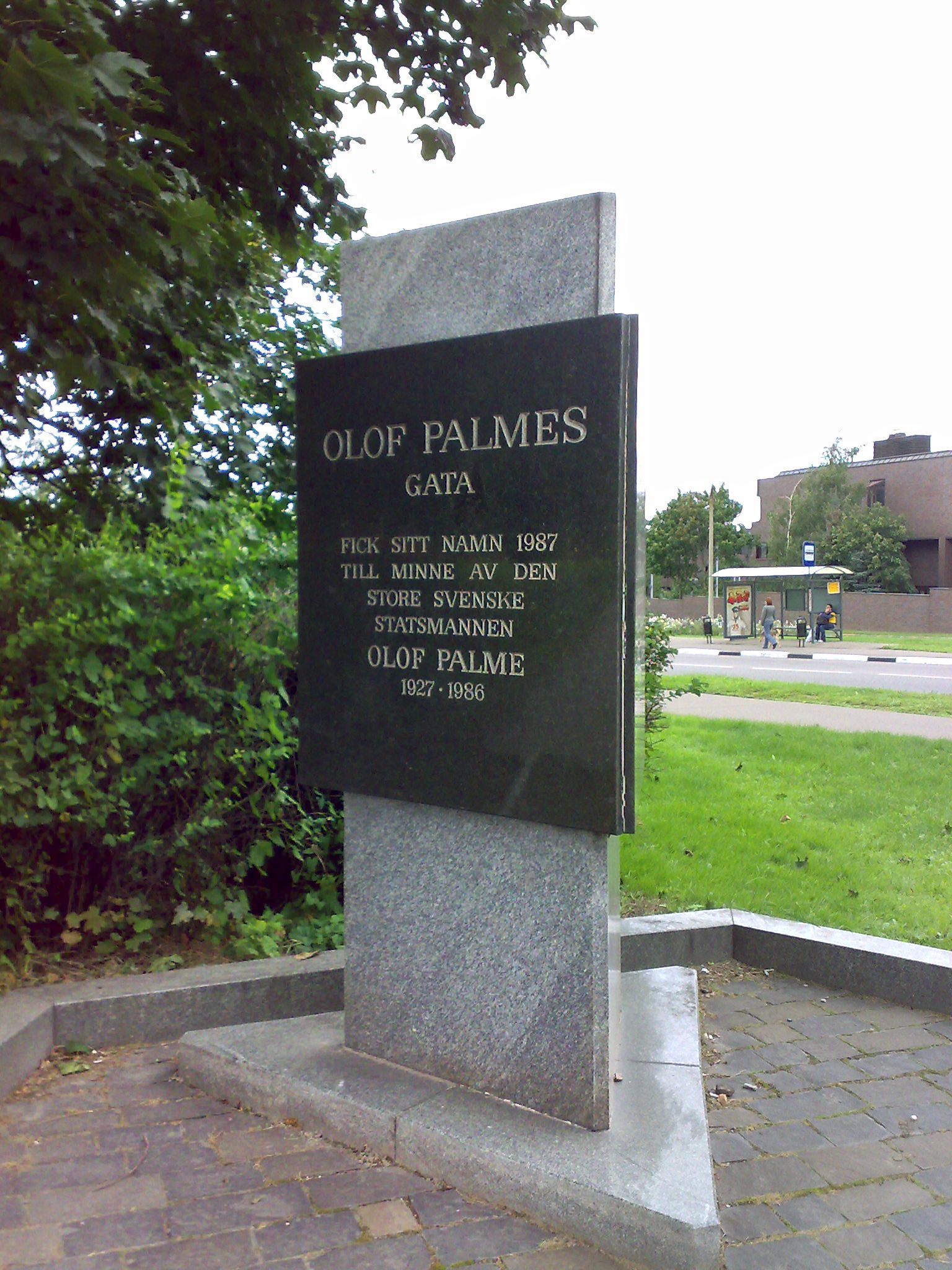
Memorial outside the embassy of Sweden at the corner of Olof Palme and Mosfilmovskaya Streets

Olof Palme Street (Russian: улица Улофа Пальме, romanised: úlitsa Úlofa Pál'me) is a street in Ramenki District, Western Administrative Okrug, Moscow. The street was named after Olof Palme, the assassinated Prime Minister of Sweden.

== Layout ==
Olof Palme Street is effectively an extension of Universitetsky Prospekt, the latter ending at a crossroads with Mosfilmovskaya Street. Olof Palme Street runs further north-west downhill towards Setun River and turns to the right after crossing Dovzhenko Street.

== Notable buildings ==
- 4 – Embassy of the United Arab Emirates
- 6 – Embassy of Angola

The embassy of Sweden is located at the crossing of Mosfilmovskaya Street and Olof Palme Street, the actual address being 60 Mosfilmovskaya Street.

== Image gallery ==
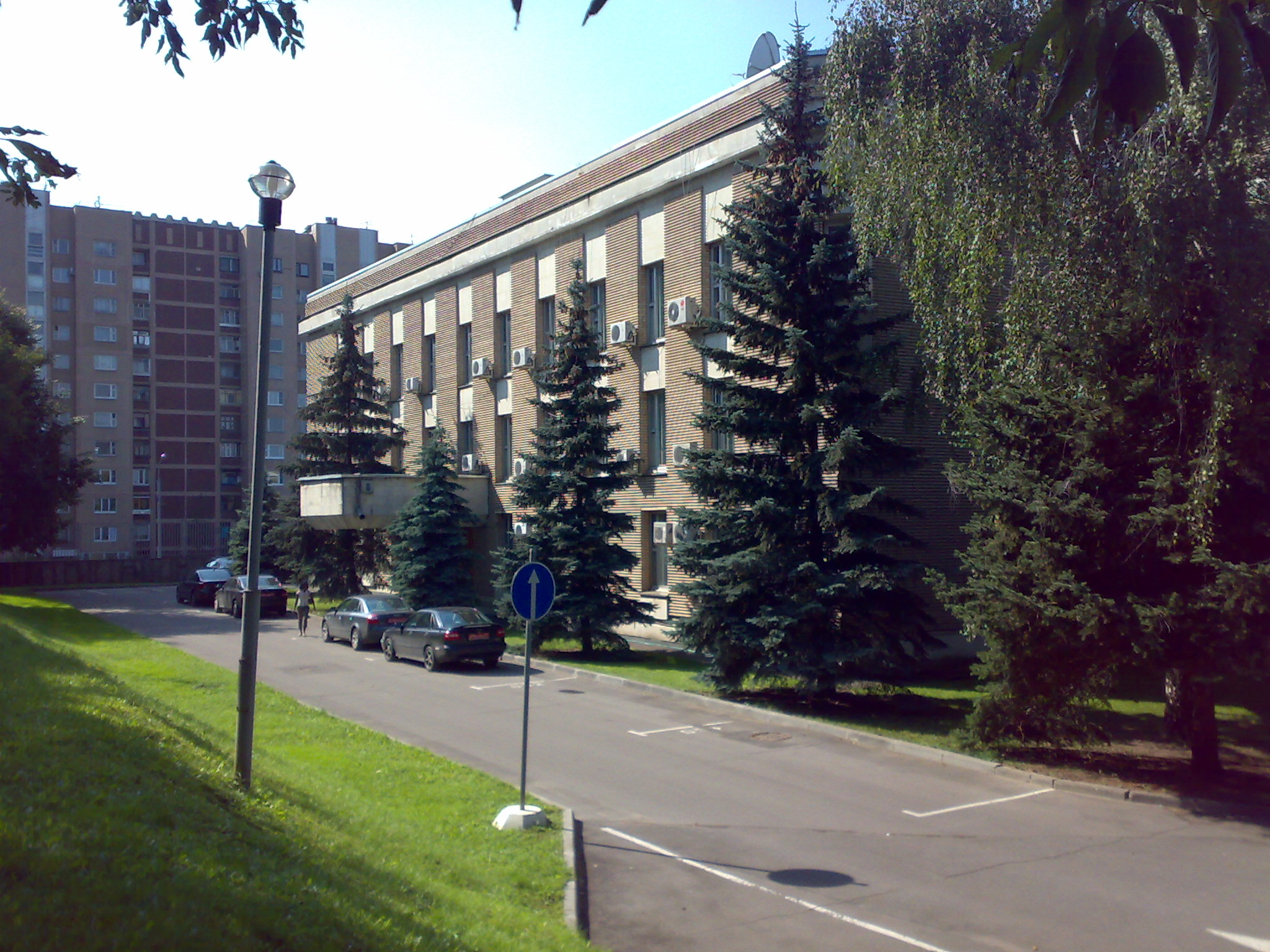
Embassy of Angola

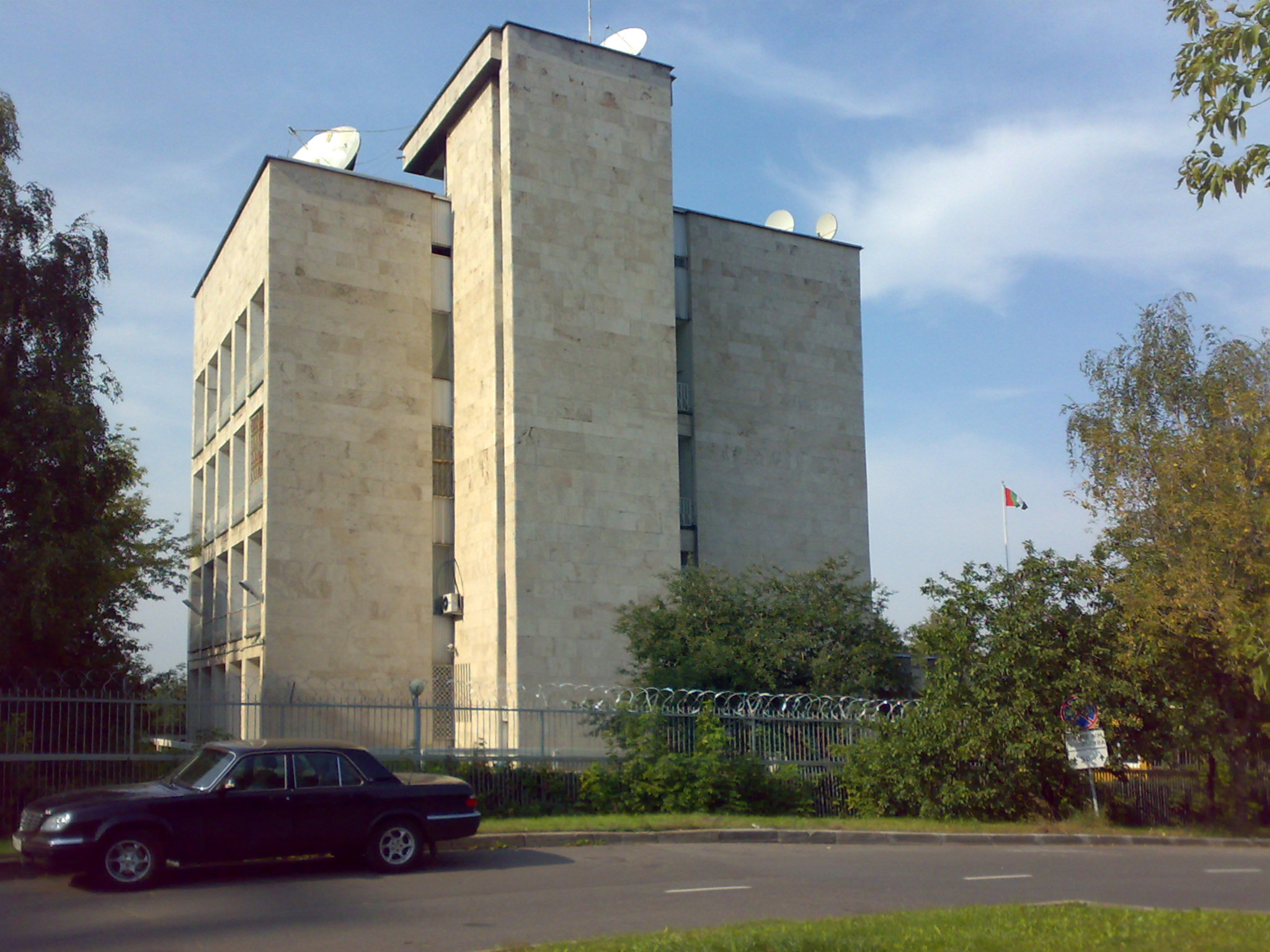
Embassy of the United Arab Emirates
