= Embassy of Sweden, Moscow =

Diplomatic mission of Sweden in Moscow

- Location: Moscow
- Address: 60 Mosfilmovskaya Street; 119 590 Moscow; Russia
- Coordinates: 55°43′0.12″N 37°30′56.88″E
- Opening: 1631
- Ambassador: Christina Johannesson
- Jurisdiction: Russia
- Website: Official website

The Embassy of Sweden in Moscow is the chief diplomatic mission of Sweden in the Russian Federation. It is located at 60 Mosfilmovskaya Street (Russian: Мосфильмовская ул., 60), on the corner of Ulofa Palme Street (Russian: ул. Улофа Пальме), in the Ramenki District of Moscow.

== History ==
Already in 1617, there were Swedish agents who had their own house in Moscow. This was confiscated during the Great Wrath (1700–1721). In 1754, Saint Petersburg appointed a new commissioner. During the 18th and 19th centuries, a Swedish consulate was staffed intermittently. In 1872, an honorary consulate was finally established with the city as its district. In 1906, it became a career consulate and also covered the governorates of Moscow, Vladimir, Yaroslavl, Kostroma, Ufa, Samara, Simbirsk, Orenburg, Penza, Kazan, Nizhny Novgorod, Ryazan, Tula, Kaluga, Smolensk, Orel, Kursk, Voronezh, Tambov, Saratov, and the "Land of the Ural Cossacks." In 1916, Moscow was elevated to a consulate general, but it was closed during the Russian Revolution. In 1924, the diplomatic mission in Leningrad was moved back to Moscow. During Operation Barbarossa, all diplomatic missions in Moscow were transferred to the city of Kuibyshev. In 1947, the legation in Moscow was elevated to an embassy.

== Staff and tasks ==
The Swedish embassy in Moscow is one of Sweden's largest diplomatic missions. It represents Sweden and the Swedish government in Russia and works to promote Swedish interests. The embassy is organized into several key departments:

- Economic Department: Monitors the economic situation in Russia, including the conditions for Swedish businesses.
- Political Department: Responsible for reporting on the political landscape in Russia, including human rights issues, Russian foreign policy, and Russia–Sweden relations.
- Migration Department: Handles applications for visas, residence permits, and work permits from Russian citizens and other legal residents of the Russian Federation.
- Administrative Department: Supports the embassy with various practical and administrative tasks, and also includes a consular function that assists Swedish citizens in Russia, such as those who have lost their passports.
- Cultural Department: Disseminates information about Sweden and engages in a wide range of cultural activities.
- Defence Department: Monitors military and security developments in Russia.

== Buildings ==
=== Chancery ===
In the 1910s, the embassy chancery was located at Anglijskaja Nabereschnaja 64 in Petrograd. In the early 1920s, it moved to Ulitza Vorovskij/Vorovskovo 44 in Moscow. In 1964, the embassy moved to Ulitsa Pisemskovo 15. After many years of negotiations, the construction of a new Swedish embassy in Moscow could begin in July 1968. In 1972, it was ready for use on 60 Mosfilmovskaya Street. The embassy was designed by the Swedish architect Anders Tengbom.

The embassy is a tight red brick building with a closed facade facing the street. The windows in the buildings are mainly located towards the garden. The architecture is reminiscent of the fact that the embassy was built during a time when security issues were central. But the closed, fortress-like façade would be compensated by the fact that it was possible to enter the embassy's courtyard and indoors with the help of bright interiors. After a serious incident in the 1980s, the embassy area had to be fenced off. In the courtyard, the sculpture "Gestalt i storm" by Bror Marklund dominates. The bricks for the facades were obtained from Forsa brickworks in Bollebygd.

In the summer of 2002, a new visa chancery was inaugurated at the property, which was built to cope with the extended visa processing that followed the Schengen Agreement. The extension had the same exterior appearance as previous buildings. On the ground floor are the Foreign Ministry's archives and on the ground floor a modern office environment. A large lantern provides the visa office with extra daylight. The architect was Jesper Husman at Tengbom Arkitekter.

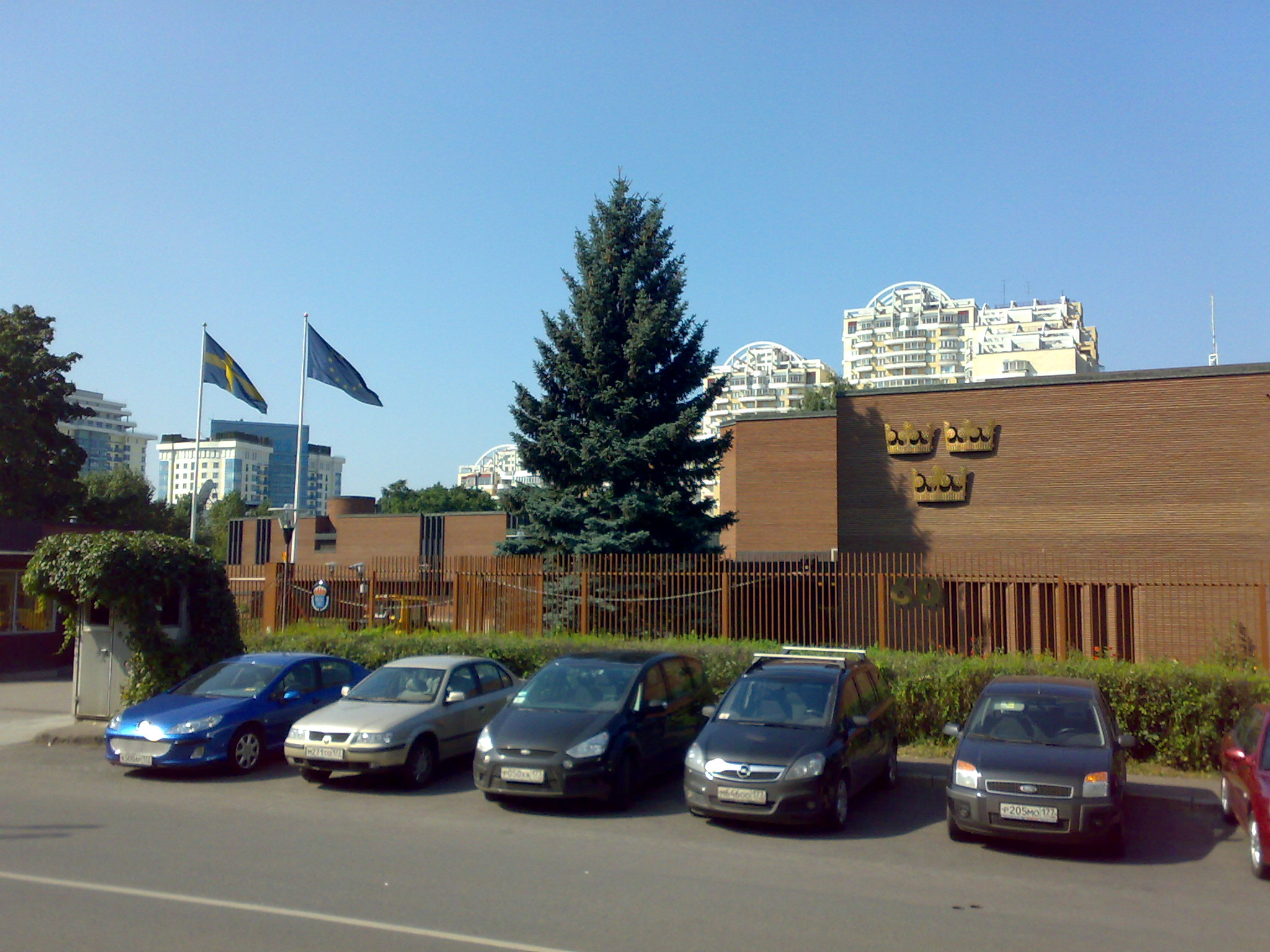
Embassy building in 2008

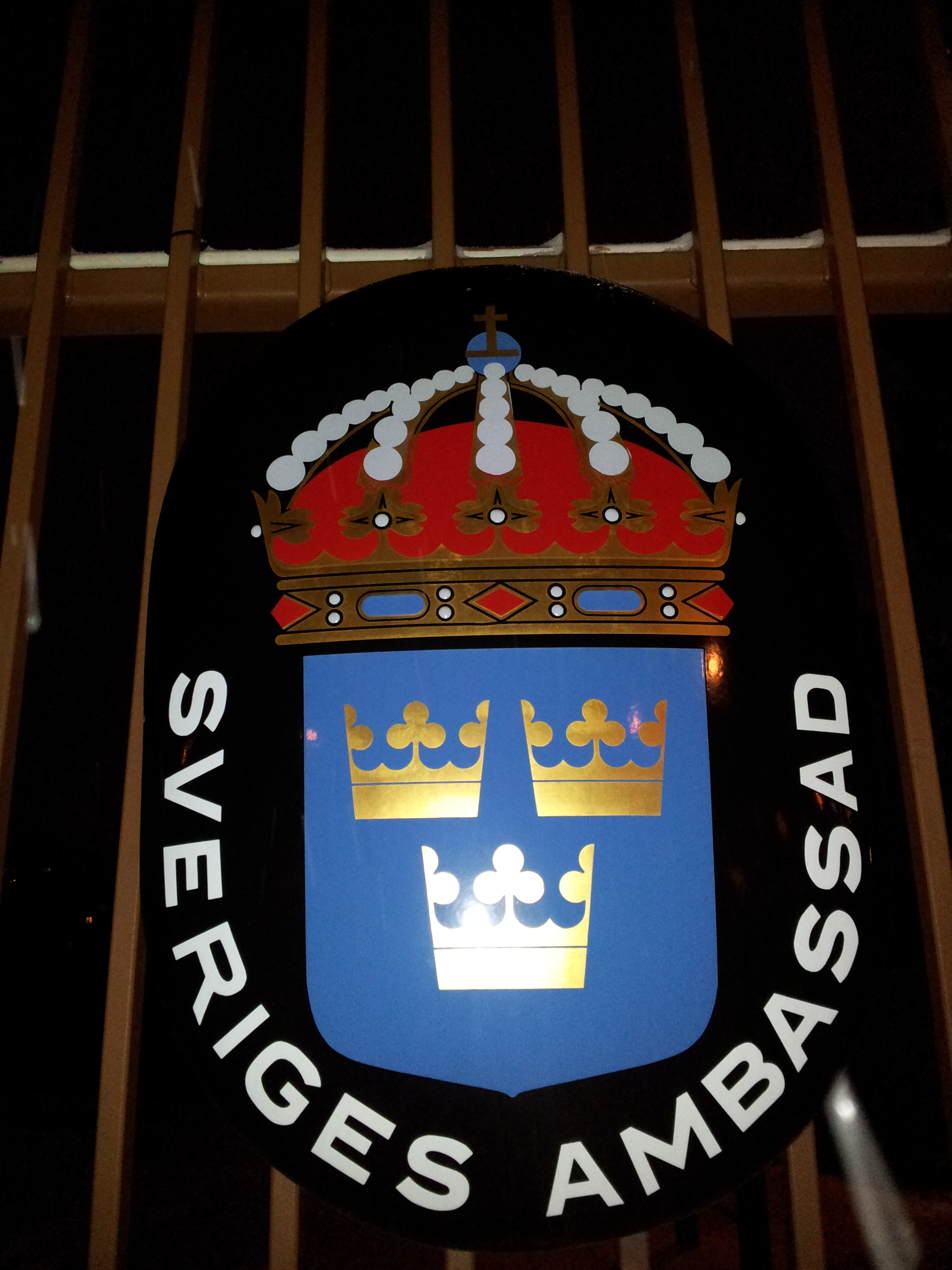
Lesser coat of arms at the entrance

== See also ==
- Russia–Sweden relations
- List of diplomatic missions in Russia
