= Setun River's Valley wildlife sanctuary =

Conservation area in Moscow, Russia

Setun River's Valley
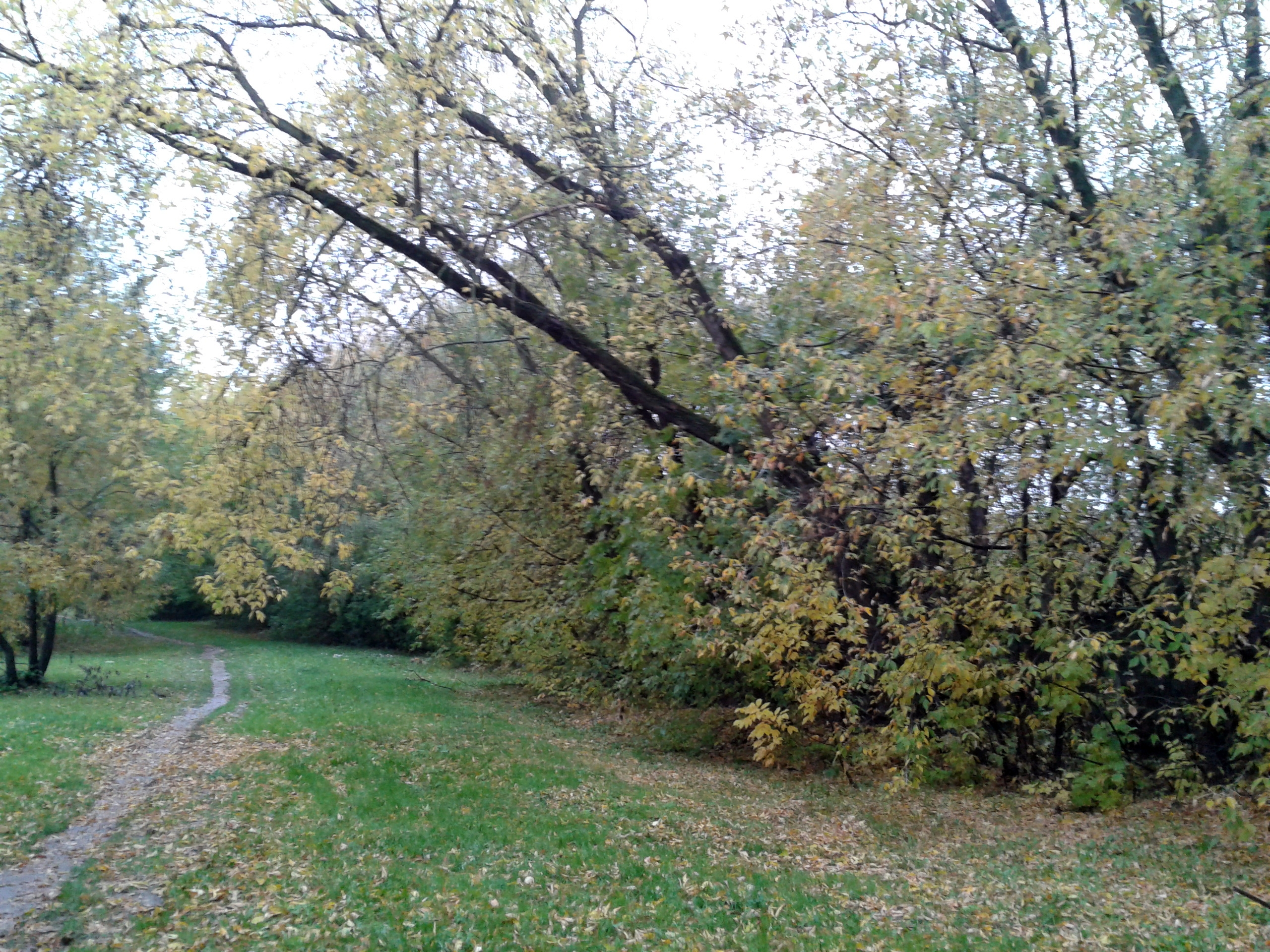
- Interactive map of Setun River's Valley
- Location: Moscow, Russian Federation
- Coordinates: 55°42′15″N 37°24′32″E
- Area: 6,932 km^{2} (2,676 sq mi)
- Website: http://www.setun.info/ (in Russian)

Setun River's Valley (Russian: Долина реки «Сетунь») is the largest wildlife sanctuary within the Moscow bounds. The sanctuary territory is located along the course of the Setun River. The Setun River's flow is entirely within the Western Administrative Okrug of the city.

The fauna is represented by the least weasel, stoat, Eurasian water shrew, and muskrat.

It was founded in 1998.
