= Generala Dorokhova Avenue =

Street in Moscow, Russia

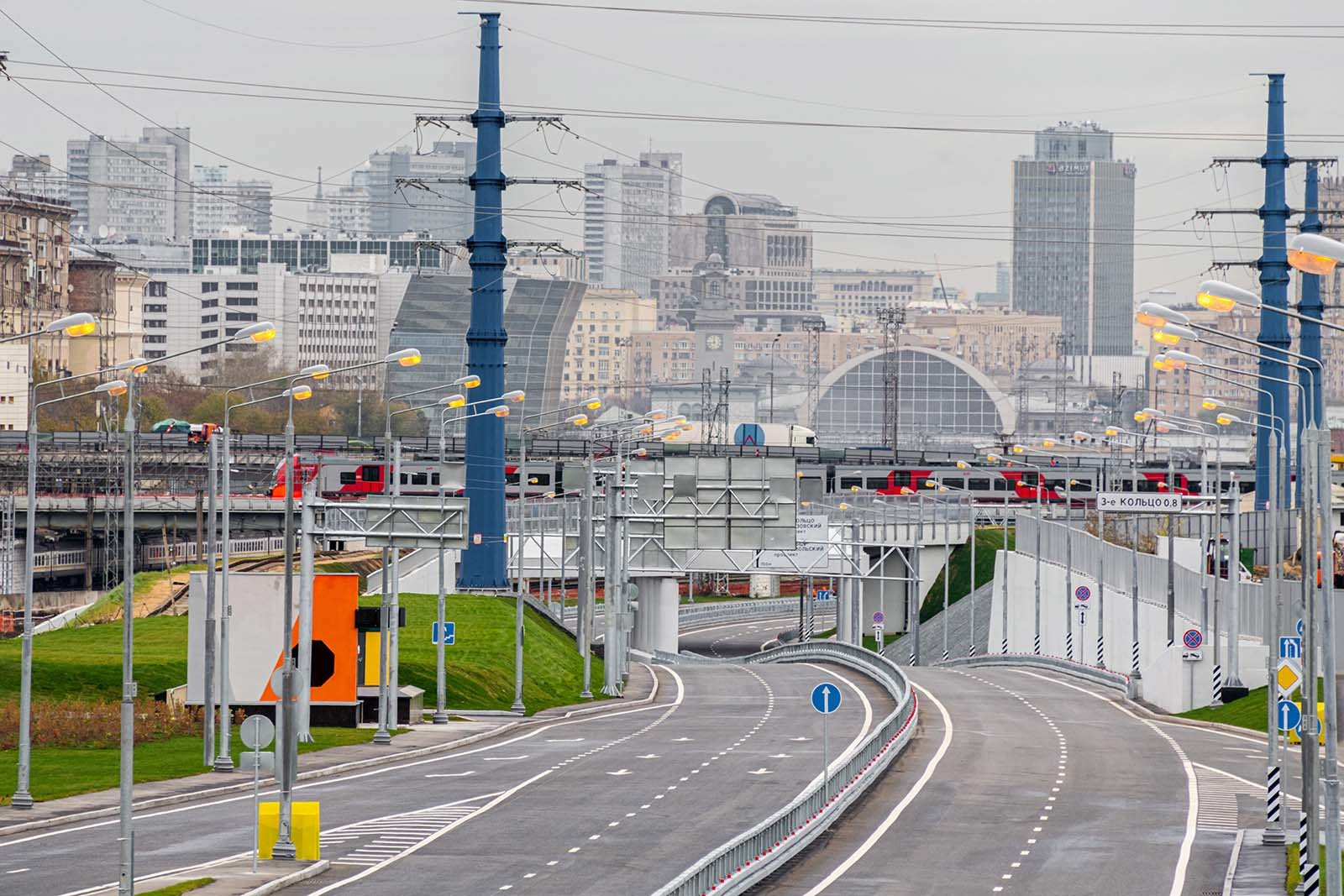
- Interactive map of Generala Dorokhova Avenue
- Location: Moscow, Russia

Construction
- Inauguration: 2020

Generala Dorokhova Avenue (also known as Southern relief road for Kutuzovsky Avenue) is an urban highway in Moscow. The highway was opened in October 2020.

== Gallery ==
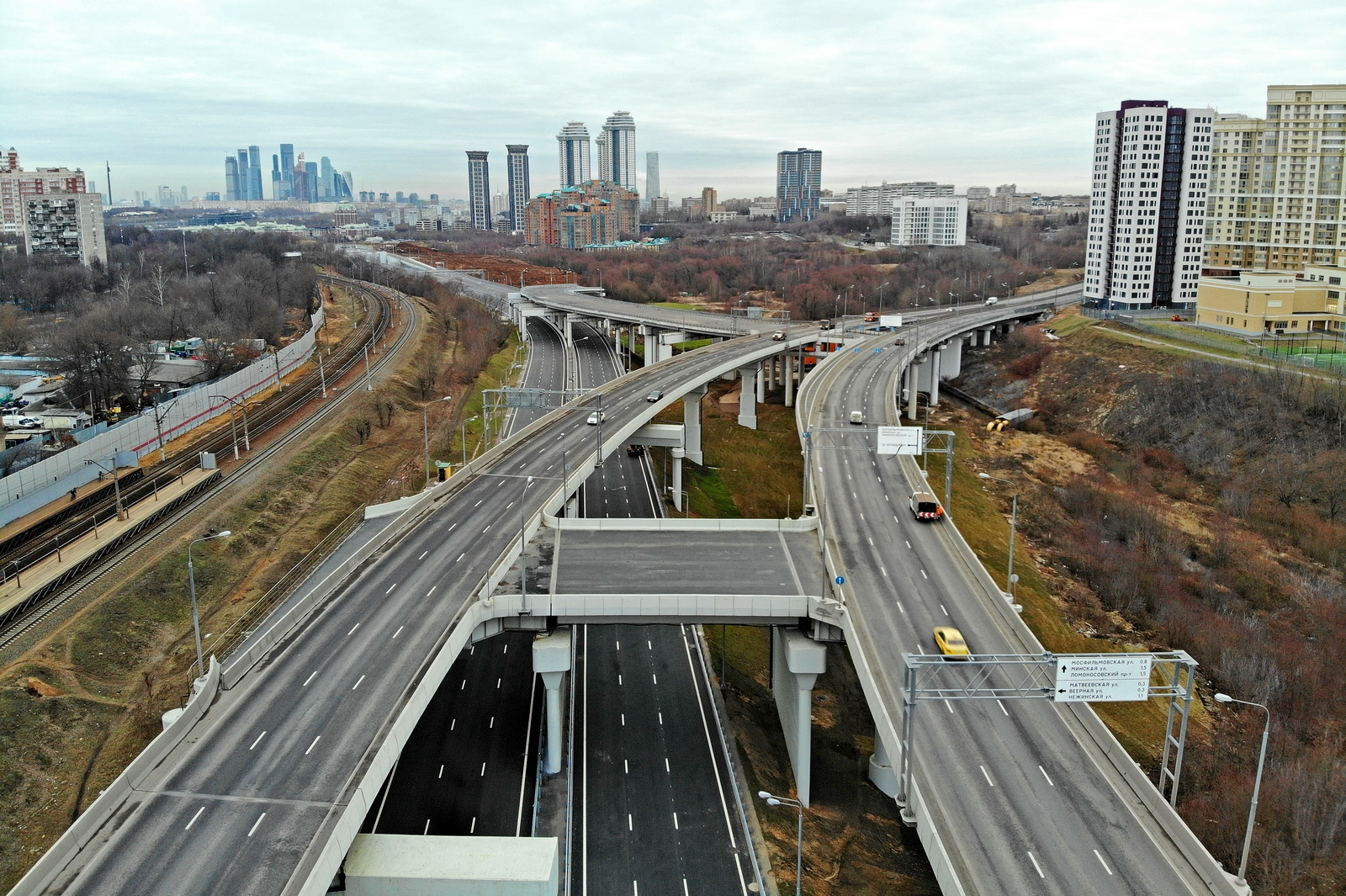
An interchange with Mosfilmovskaya Street, January 2020.

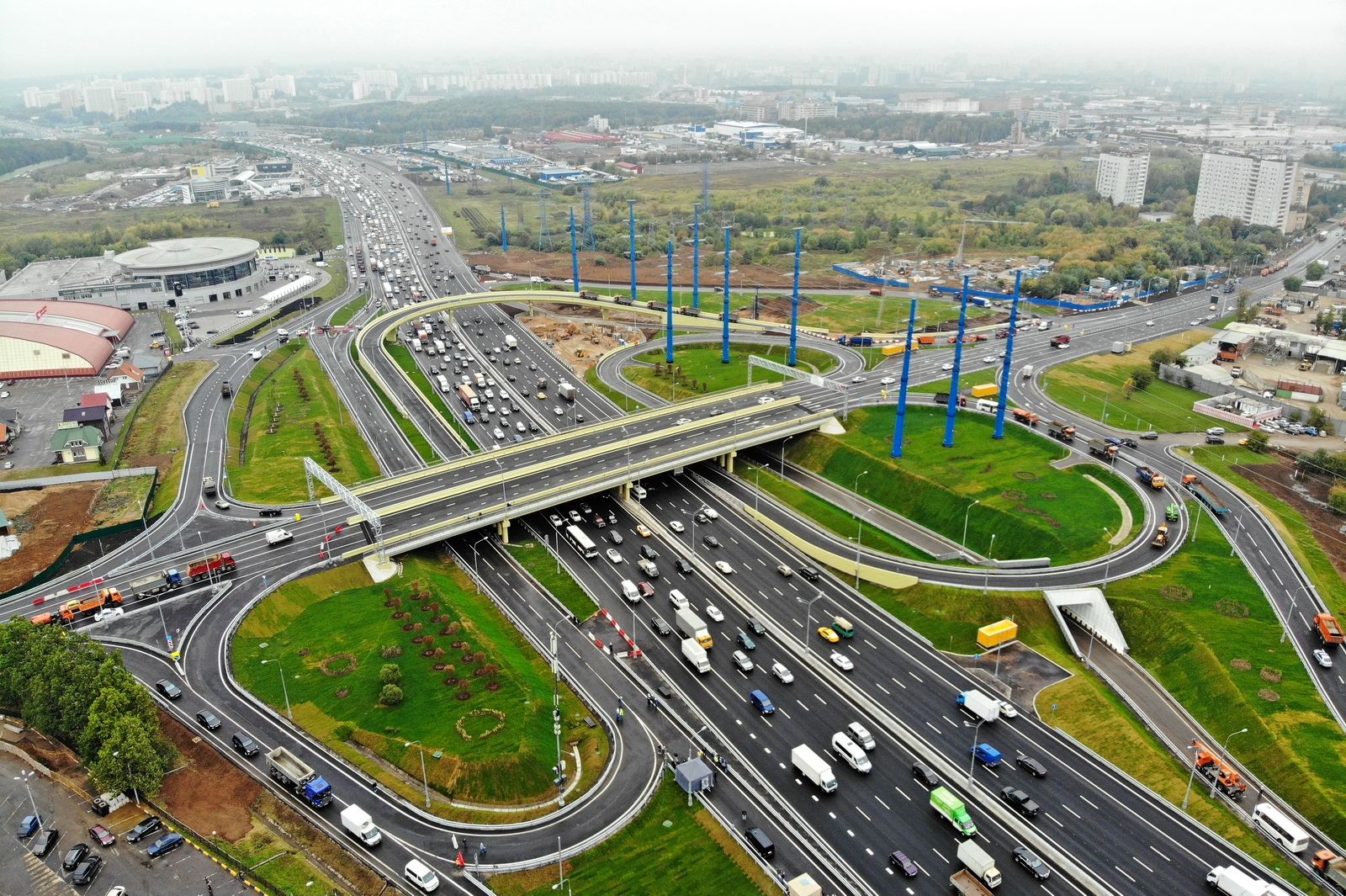
An interchange with the Moscow Automobile Ring Road (in the lower level).

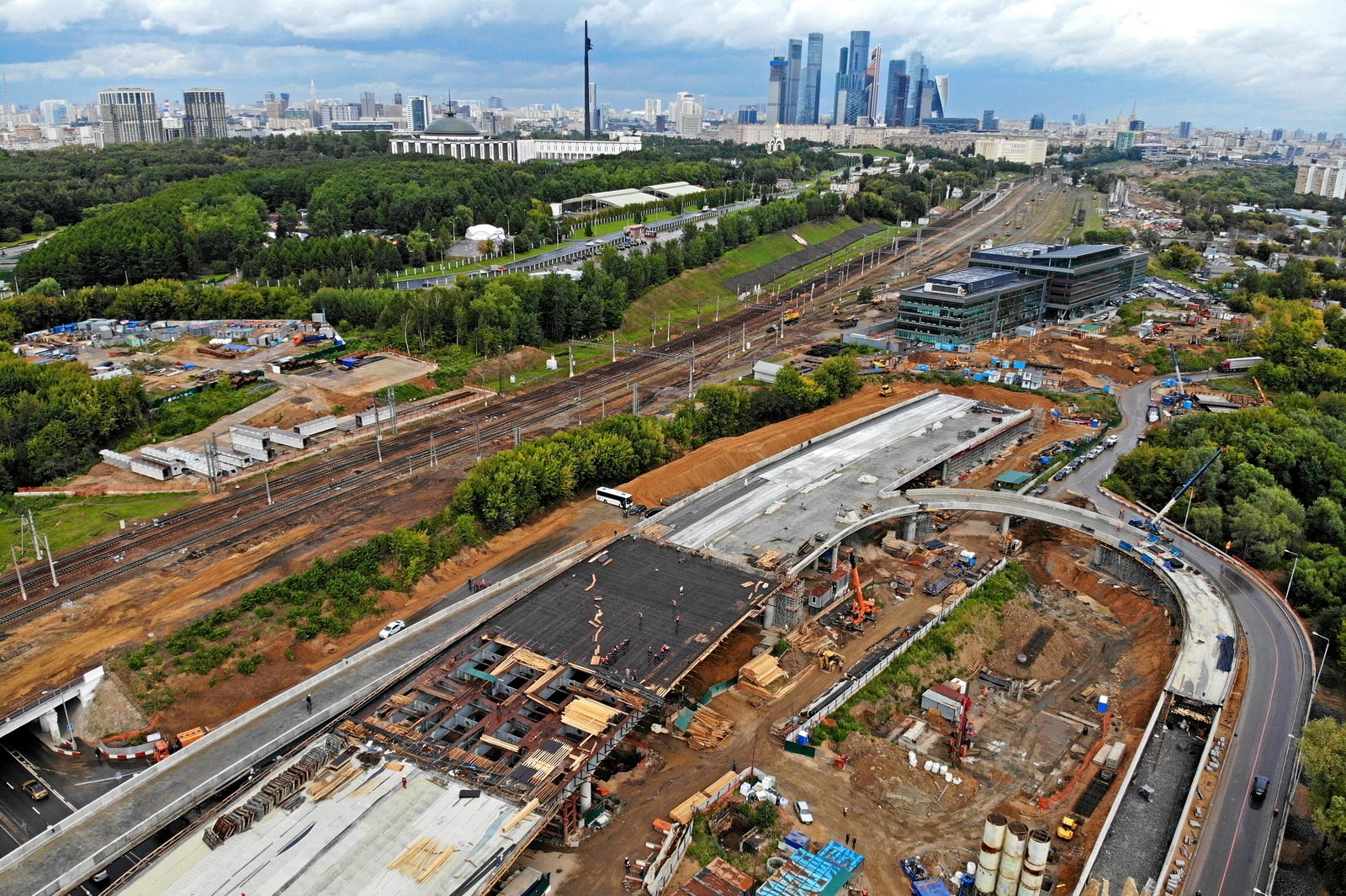
The construction of an interchange with Minskaya Street, August 2019.

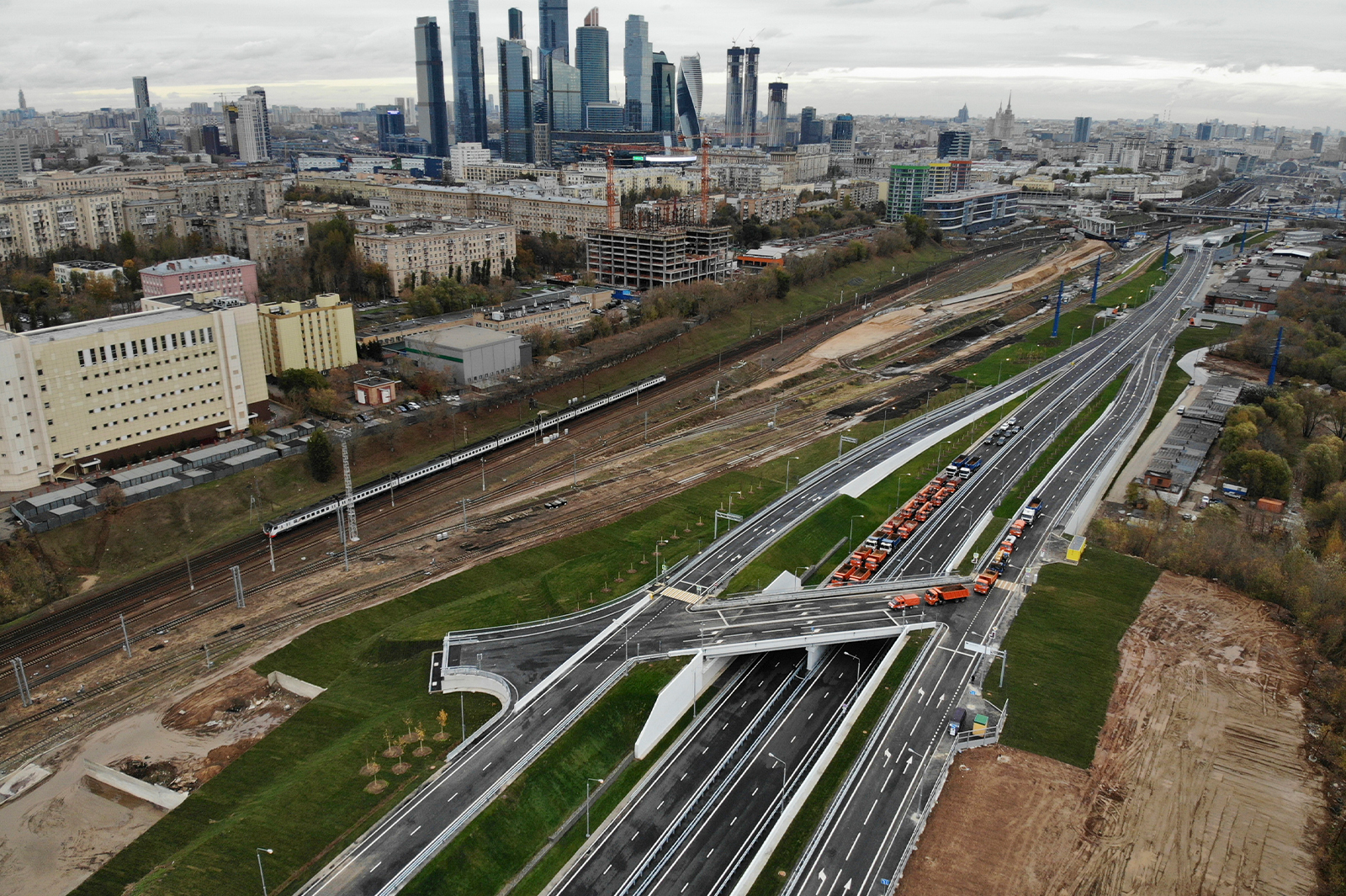
The outbound arterial road was opened on 21 October 2020.
