= Setun (river) =

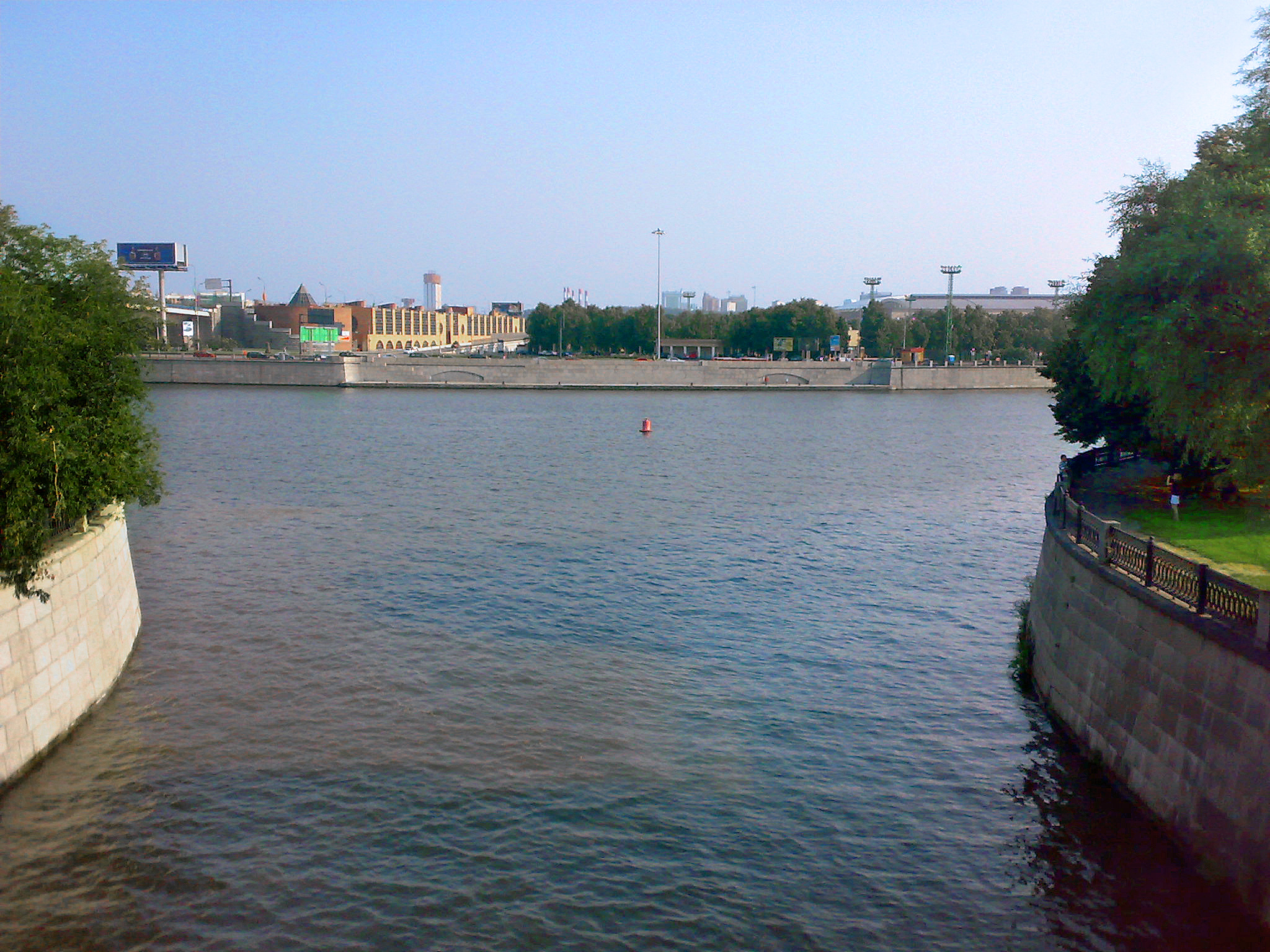
- Confluence of the Setun (front) and the Moskva, with Luzhniki in the distance
- Native name: Сетунь (Russian)

Location
- Country: Russia

Physical characteristics
- Mouth: Moskva
  - coordinates: 55.7278°N 37.5439°E
- Length: 38 km (24 mi)
- Basin size: 190 km^{2} (73 sq mi)

Basin features
- Progression: Moskva→ Oka→ Volga→ Caspian Sea

The Setun (Russian: Се́тунь) is a river in the west of Moscow and the largest tributary of the Moskva in Moscow. The length of the river is 38 kilometres (24 mi), 20 kilometres (12 mi) of which is in Moscow itself. Its basin has an area of 190 square kilometres (73 sq mi). The Setun originates in the village of Salariyevo in Moskva and flows intoKrasnoluzhsky Road Bridge, opposite to the former village of Luzhniki. The river teems with roach, European perch, crucian carp, pike, and other fish, but is of no value to the fishing industry due to pollution with toxic waste.

The border territory upon both banks is included in Setun River's Valley wildlife sanctuary, placed in the Moscow city bounds.

== Image gallery ==
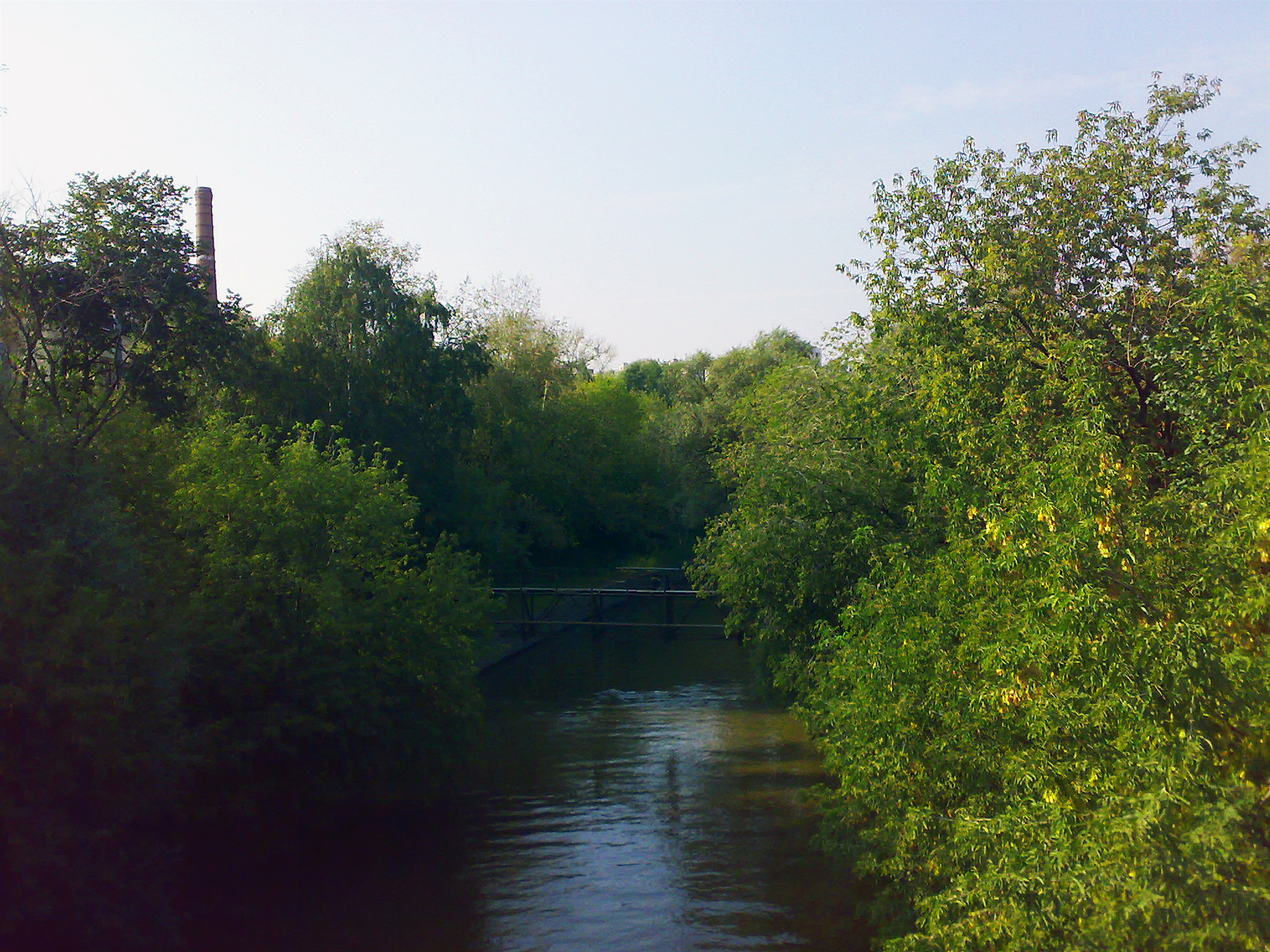
The Setun River near its influx into the Moskva River

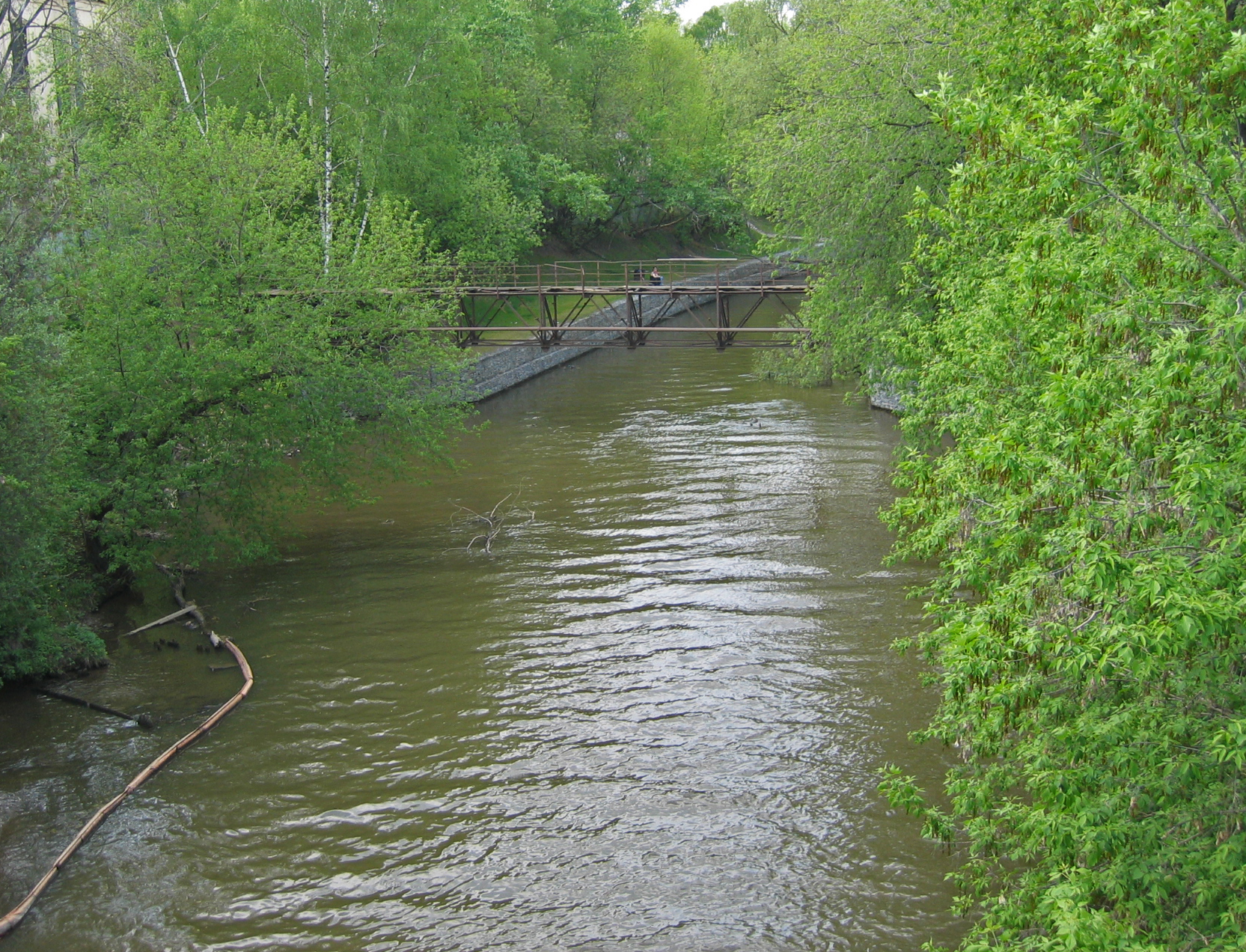
Floating litter trap
