= Mikhail Kobetsky =

Soviet politician and diplomat

Mikhail Veniaminovich Kobetsky (14 October 1881, in Odessa – 28 April 1937, in Moscow) was a Soviet politician and diplomat. From 1919 the head of the publishing house of the magazine Kommunisticheskii Internatsional in Petrograd. From 1922 he was a member of ECCI, the director of the Petrograd Department (Bureau) of the Executive Committee of the Communist International (ECCI). In 1921 he entered the Secretariat of ECCI. In 1924–27 he was the Polpred of the Soviet Union to Estonia (1924), Denmark (1924–33), Greece (1934–37) and Albania (1935–37). From January 1933 he was the referent of ECCI for the Scandinavian countries.

He was recalled to Moscow in 1937 and arrested during one of the purges and executed.

Diplomatic posts
| Preceded by Leonid Stark | Plenipotentiary Representative of the Soviet Union in Estonia; 1924 | Succeeded by Adolf Petrovsky |
| Preceded by ? | Plenipotentiary Representative of the Soviet Union in Denmark; 1924–1933 | Succeeded by Fyodor Raskolnikov |
| Preceded by Yakov Davydov | Plenipotentiary Representative of the Soviet Union in Greece; 1934–1937 | Succeeded by Nikolai Sharonov |
| Preceded by Arkady Krakovecky | Plenipotentiary Representative of the Soviet Union in Albania (non-resident); 1935–1937 | Succeeded by Nikolai Sharonov |
