= List of ambassadors of Russia to Albania =

Ambassador of the Russian Federation to Albania
- Emblem of the Russian Foreign Ministry
- Incumbent; Aleksey Zaitsev since 14 June 2024
- Ministry of Foreign Affairs; Embassy of Russia in Tirana
- Style: His Excellency; The Honourable
- Reports to: Minister of Foreign Affairs
- Seat: Tirana
- Appointer: President of Russia
- Term length: At the pleasure of the president
- Website: Embassy of Russia in Tirana

The ambassador extraordinary and plenipotentiary of the Russian Federation to the Republic of Albania is the official representative of the president and the government of the Russian Federation to the president and the government of Albania.

The ambassador and his staff work at large in the Embassy of Russia in Tirana. The post of Russian ambassador to Albania is currently held by Aleksey Zaitsev, incumbent since 14 June 2024.

== History of diplomatic relations ==
Attempts to establish diplomatic relations at the mission level between the Soviet Union and Albania began after the June Revolution in 1924 under the auspices of the Soviet ambassador to Greece Arkady Krakovetsky. Krakovetsky arrived in Tirana on 16 December 1924, but events overtook him when the Albanian government fell to armed forces that placed Ahmed Bey Zogu in power as president of the Albanian Republic. Relations were finally established in September 1934, with the ambassador to Greece serving as non-resident representative to Albania, but were broken off in April 1939 after the Italian invasion and occupation of Albania.

Diplomatic relations were resumed after the war, with the Soviet government recognising the Democratic Government of Albania on 10 November 1945, which after 1946 became the People's Socialist Republic of Albania. The first Soviet envoy, Dmitry Chuvakhin, presented his credentials on 11 January 1946. After a period of relatively strong relations, disagreements between the Albanian and Soviet governments caused relations to deteriorate sharply in the late 1950s and early 1960s. The Soviets withdrew their embassy in November 1961, and officially suspended diplomatic relations the following month. Relations were only restored after a joint meeting in June-July 1990 between the Soviet and Albanian foreign ministries. The Soviet embassy in Tirana was reopened in February 1991, while the Albanian embassy in Moscow opened in April 1991. With the dissolution of the Soviet Union in 1991, the Soviet ambassador, Viktor Nerubaylo, continued as representative of the Russian Federation until 1996.

== List of representatives (1924–present) ==
=== Soviet Union to Albania (1924–1991) ===
Name	Title	Appointment	Termination	Notes
Arkady Krakovetsky	Diplomatic representative	January	18 December 1924	
Mikhail Kobetsky	Diplomatic representative (non-resident)	23 January 1935	28 April 1937	
Nikolai Sharonov	Diplomatic representative (non-resident)	13 November 1937	7 April 1939	
Dmitry Chuvakhin	Envoy	12 December 1945	16 March 1952	
Kliment Lyovychkin	Envoy (before August 1953); Ambassador (after August 1953)	12 December 1945	7 December 1955	
Leonid Krylov	Ambassador	7 December 1955	7 March 1957	
Vasily Ivanov	Ambassador	7 March 1957	24 November 1960	
Iosif Shikin	Ambassador	24 November 1960	21 January 1963	Withdrawn in November 1961
Viktor Nerubaylo	Ambassador	15 February 1991	25 December 1991	

=== Russian Federation to Albania (1991–present) ===
Name	Title	Appointment	Termination	Notes
Viktor Nerubaylo	Ambassador	25 December 1991	2 November 1996	
Igor Saprykin	Ambassador	2 November 1996	26 July 2000	
Vladimir Tokin	Ambassador	26 July 2000	26 August 2005	
Alexander Prishchepov	Ambassador	26 August 2005	28 January 2010	
Leonid Abramov	Ambassador	28 January 2010	10 July 2014	
Aleksandr Karpushin	Ambassador	10 July 2014	16 September 2019	
Mikhail Afanasyev	Ambassador	16 September 2019	20 May 2024	
Aleksey Zaitsev	Ambassador	14 June 2024		
