= Aboimov =

Aboimov (Russian: Абоимов) is a Russian surname, probably from abaum, fraud. Notable people with the surname include:

- Ivan Aboimov (1936–2022), Russian diplomat
- Viktor Aboimov (born 1949), Kazakhstani swimmer
