= Demonstration in support of Ukraine =

Political demonstration in Estonia

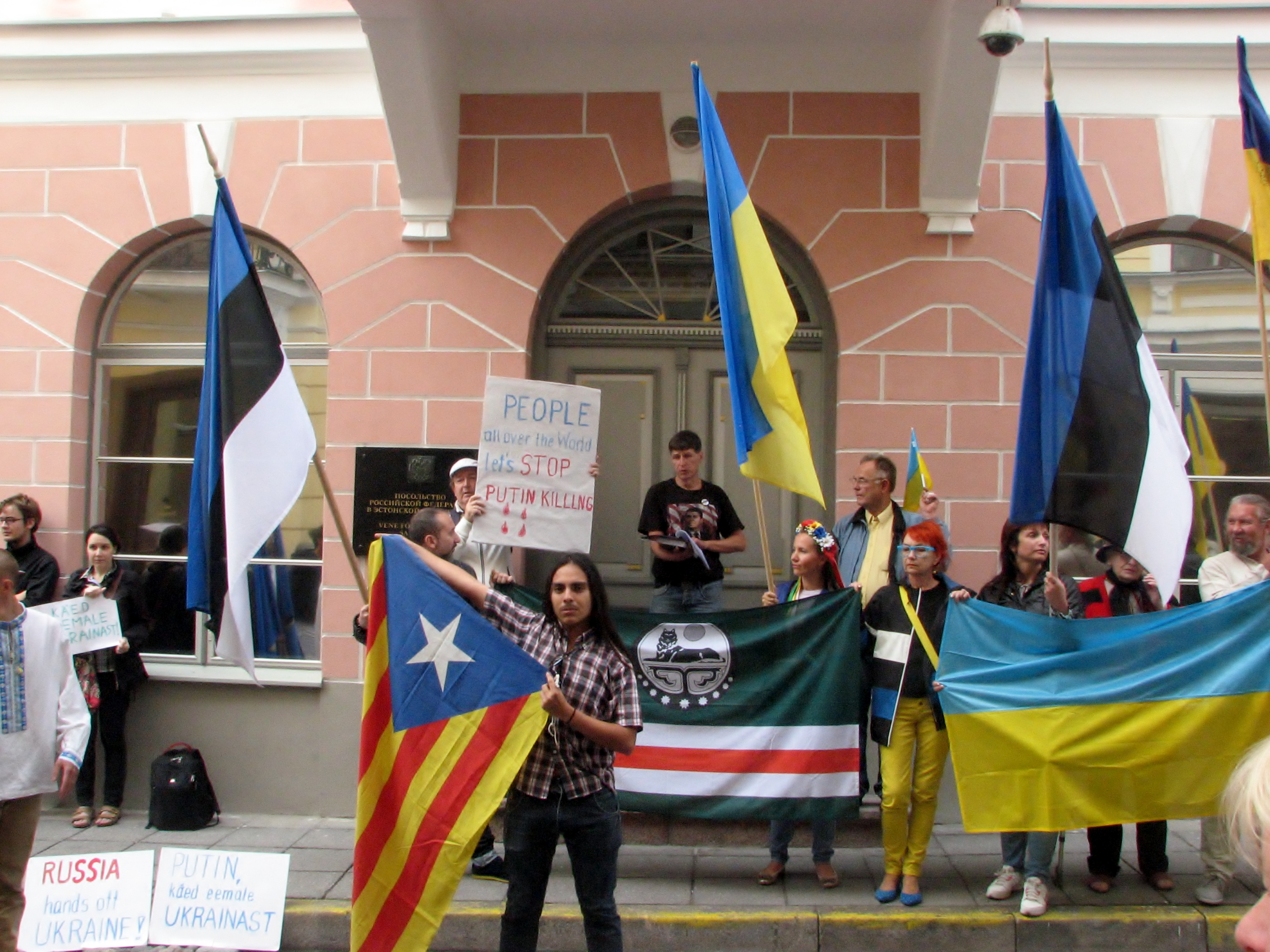
Demonstrators at the Russian Embassy in Tallinn call on Russia to respect human rights and international law. Foto: Ave Maria Mõistlik, 23 August 2014

A demonstration in support of Ukraine is a demonstration held weekly in Estonia in front of the Embassy of Russia, Tallinn since 2014.

== History ==
This has become the longest-lasting political demonstration in Estonia.

With flags, colorful placards and slogans, the demonstrators express their support for the unity of Ukraine and demand that Russia take responsibility for its role in the Donbas war, and the annexation of Crimea.

The weekly demonstrations have attracted much interest and support from passers-by, especially from the numerous foreign tourists visiting Estonia.

Due to the coronavirus pandemic, the weekly gatherings were temporarily suspended since 12 March 2020, resumed 4 June 2020 and will continue until Russian military forces are withdrawn from Donbass and the occupation of Crimea ended.

The organizers are the NGO "Support Ukraine" and members of the political party Isamaa.
