= Alexander Bekzadyan =

Bolshevik revolutionary and Soviet statesman of Armenian descent

- Ալեքսանդր Բեկզադյան
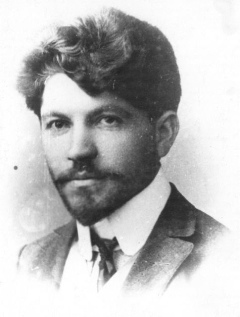
- Bekzadyan in 1909

Ambassador of the Soviet Union to Hungary
- In office 17 November 1934 – 20 November 1937
- Preceded by: Adolf Petrovsky
- Succeeded by: Viktor Plotnikov

Ambassador of the Soviet Union to Norway
- In office 30 October 1930 – 17 November 1934
- Preceded by: Alexandra Kollontay
- Succeeded by: Ignaty Yakubovich

People's Commissar of Foreign Affairs of the Armenian SSR
- In office 29 November 1920 – 1 May 1921
- Preceded by: Position established
- Succeeded by: Askanaz Mravyan

Personal details
- Born: 15 September 1879 Shushi, Elizavetpol Governorate, Russian Empire
- Died: 1 August 1938 (aged 58) Kommunarka shooting ground, Moscow Oblast, Russian SFSR, Soviet Union

Alexander Artemyevich Bekzadyan (Russian: Александр Артемьевич Бекзадян; Armenian: Ալեքսանդր Հարությունի Բեկզադյան, romanized: Alexander Harutyuni Bekzadyan; 15 September 1879 – 1 August 1938) was a Bolshevik revolutionary and Soviet statesman of Armenian descent. After serving as Soviet ambassador to Norway and to Hungary he was executed during the Great Purge.

== Early years ==
Alexander Harutyunyi (Artemi) Bekzadian was born in 1879 in Shushi, Russian Empire. He graduated from the Shusha Real School. Between 1900 and 1902, he studied at the Kyiv Polytechnic Institute. In 1911, he graduated from the Faculty of Public Policy at the University of Zurich.

Following his departure from the Kyiv Polytechnic Institute, Bekzadian became involved with the burgeoning Bolshevik party. He was arrested within Russia as a member of the Baku and Transcaucasian Committees of the Bolshevik party, but escaped in 1906. Bekzadian participated in several conferences of the Russian Social Democratic Labour Party in Europe and Russia, and maintained close contact with the figures of the Second International from European parties. In 1914, after the completion of his studies in Zurich, he worked in Baku, then in the North Caucasus.

== Soviet career ==
Following the October Revolution, he served as deputy chairman of the Revolutionary Committee of Armenia and as the first People's Commissar of Foreign Affairs of Armenian Soviet Socialist Republic, from 1920 to 1921. Between December 1920 and January 1921, he sent letters to the Turkish government, demanding an end to atrocities against the Armenian population in the occupied Armenian territories, putting forth a proposition to hold negotiations for the return of Kars and Alexandropol to Soviet Armenia.

From 1926 to 1930, he was the Deputy Chairman of the government of the Transcaucasian Soviet Federative Republic and People's Commissar of Trade. Bekzadyan served as the ambassador of the USSR in Norway from 1930 to 1934, and then in Hungary from 1934 to 1937.

== Arrest, execution, and rehabilitation ==
On 21 November 1937, during the Great Purge, he was arrested on charges of counter-revolutionary activities and sentenced to death by the Military Collegium of the USSR Supreme Court. On 1 August 1938, the sentence was carried out at the Kommunarka shooting ground. Bekzadyan was posthumously rehabilitated in 1956.

On May 24, 2015, a Last Address memorial plaque for Alexander Artemyevich Bekzadyan was installed in Moscow on the façade of building No. 16 on Staropimenovsky Lane.

== See also ==
- Bibliography of the Russian Revolution and Civil War
- Bibliography of Stalinism and the Soviet Union
