= Vasily Ivanov (politician) =

Soviet diplomat (1905–1989)

- Василий Иванов

Ambassador of the Soviet Union to Albania
- In office 7 March 1957 – 24 November 1960
- Preceded by: Leonid Krylov
- Succeeded by: Iosif Shikin

Ambassador of the Soviet Union to North Korea
- In office 17 June 1955 – 22 February 1957
- Preceded by: Sergey Suzdalev
- Succeeded by: Alexander Puzanov

Chairman of Khabarovsk Krai Executive Committee
- In office 7 July 1949 – 3 March 1953
- Preceded by: Fyodor Mamonov
- Succeeded by: Fyodor Kotov

Chairman of Irkutsk Oblast Executive Committee
- In office August 1944 – 9 September 1947
- Preceded by: Nikolai Komissarov
- Succeeded by: Innokenty Nikolsky

Personal details
- Born: 1905 Molvotitsy, Demyansky Uyezd, Russian Empire
- Died: 1989 Moscow, Soviet Union
- Party: Communist Party of the Soviet Union
- Education: Herzen Pedagogical Institute
- Awards: Order of the Red Banner of Labour

Vasily Ivanovich Ivanov (Russian: Василий Иванов; 1905-1989) was a Soviet politician and diplomat who served as the executive committees of Irkutsk Oblast and Khabarovsk Krai, deputy chairman of the Council of Ministers of the Russian SFSR, and Soviet Ambassador to North Korea and Albania.

== Biography ==
Born in 1905 in the village of Molvotitsy, Demyansky Uyezd, Novgorod Governorate, Russian Empire. He graduated from the Molvotitsy Secondary School (1923), the Starodub Pedagogical College (1926), the Herzen Leningrad Pedagogical Institute (1929-1932), and completed postgraduate studies at the Leningrad Planning Institute (1934-1936). Member of the All-Union Communist Party (Bolsheviks) since 1928.

From 1924 to 1929, he taught social science at the Molvotitsy District School for Collective Farm Youth (Leningrad Governorate). From 1932 to 1934, he taught political economy at the Leningrad Department of Correspondence Education for Party Activists under the Central Committee of the Communist Party of the Soviet Union. In 1936, he became head of the Cultural and Propaganda Department of the CPSU Committee of the Leningrad Planning Institute. From 1936 to 1937, he served as an instructor for the Primorsky District Committee of the Leningrad branch of the CPSU.

From 1937 to 1939, he was head of the Department of Party Propaganda and Agitation of the Irkutsk City Committee of the CPSU, and 3rd Secretary of the Irkutsk Regional Committee of the CPSU.

From April 1939 to March 1940, he was 2nd Secretary of the Irkutsk Regional Committee of the CPSU.

From March 1940 to April 1943, he was 3rd Secretary of the Irkutsk Regional Committee of the CPSU.

From April 9, 1943 to August 1944, he was the Second Secretary of the Irkutsk Regional Committee of the CPSU.

From August 1944 to November 19, 1947, he was the Chairman of the Executive Committee of the Irkutsk Oblast Council.

From 1947 to 1949, he was an instructor in the Central Committee of the CPSU. From July 7, 1949 to March 3, 1953, he was the Chairman of the Executive Committee of the Khabarovsk Krai Council.

From January 17, 1953 to June 10, 1955, he was the Deputy Chairman of the Council of Ministers of the RSFSR.

From June 15, 1955 to February 22, 1957, he was the Ambassador Extraordinary and Plenipotentiary of the USSR to the DPRK.

From March 7, 1957 to November 24, 1960, he was the Ambassador Extraordinary and Plenipotentiary of the USSR to Albania. From 1960 to 1965, he held a senior position in the central office of the Ministry of Foreign Affairs of the Soviet Union.

From 1965 to 1974, he served as Head of the Department for Servicing the Diplomatic Corps of the Soviet Ministry of Foreign Affairs.
