= List of ambassadors of Russia to Estonia =

Ambassador of the Russian Federation to the Republic of Estonia
- Emblem of the Russian Foreign Ministry
- Incumbent vacant since 31 March 2023
- Ministry of Foreign Affairs; Embassy of Russia in Tallinn
- Style: His Excellency; The Honourable
- Reports to: Minister of Foreign Affairs
- Seat: Tallinn
- Appointer: President of Russia
- Term length: At the pleasure of the president
- Website: Embassy of Russia in Tallinn

The ambassador of Russia to Estonia is the official representative of the president and the government of the Russian Federation to the president and the government of Estonia.

Before the downgrading in diplomatic relations, the ambassador and his staff used to work at large in the Russian embassy in Tallinn. There was a consular section in Tartu, and a consulate general in Narva.

Following the Russian invasion of Ukraine, in 2022, the Estonian government closed the consular section in Tartu and the consulate general in Narva and expelled its staff. In 2023, following the expulsion of the Estonian ambassador to Russia, Russia recalled its ambassador to Estonia. The post has been vacant ever since.

== History of diplomatic relations ==
Diplomatic relations between the Republic of Estonia and the Russian Soviet Federative Socialist Republic were established on 2 February 1920, when Bolshevist Russia recognized de jure the independence of the Republic of Estonia, and renounced in perpetuity all rights to the territory of Estonia, via the Treaty of Tartu. Relations were maintained after the establishment of the Soviet Union in 1923, but deteriorated after the signing of the Molotov–Ribbentrop Pact between Germany and the USSR, and its provisions for the domination of the Baltic countries by the Soviet Union. Estonia in the Second World War was at first pressured to accept Soviet military domination, and then occupied by Soviet forces in 1940. A pro-Soviet government was installed, and on 6 August 1940 Estonia was annexed into the Soviet Union as the Estonian Soviet Socialist Republic.

During the late Soviet Glasnost policy of Mikhail Gorbachev, new elections were held, returning a parliament that introduced a resolution for independence on 8 May 1990. Anticipating Estonian independence, Boris Yeltsin, chairman of the Supreme Soviet of the Russian SFSR met with his counterpart, Arnold Rüütel, chairman of the Estonian SSR, in January 1991 to plan for transition. During the 1991 Soviet coup d'état attempt, the Estonian parliament issued a Declaration of Independence from the Soviet Union on 20 August 1991, which was recognized by the State Council of the Soviet Union on 6 September 1991. With the dissolution of the Soviet Union at the end of the year, the Russian Federation was created. The first ambassador of the Russian Federation to Estonia, Aleksandr Kuznetsov, was appointed on 24 January 1992.

Amid a breakdown of diplomatic relations, in 2023, following the expulsion of the Estonian ambassador to Russia, Russia recalled its ambassador to Estonia. The post has been vacant ever since.

== List of representatives (1920–present) ==
=== Russian Soviet Federative Socialist Republic to Estonia (1920–1923) ===
Name	Title	Appointment	Termination	Notes
Isidore Gukovsky	Diplomatic representative	11 February 1920	1920	
Nikolai Klyshko	Diplomatic representative	1920	1921	
Maxim Litvinov	Acting diplomatic representative	26 December 1920	12 September 1921	
Leonid Stark	Diplomatic representative Acting, prior to 15 November 1922	12 September 1921	1923	

=== Soviet Union to Estonia (1923–1940) ===
Name	Title	Appointment	Termination	Notes
Leonid Stark	Diplomatic representative	1923	12 May 1924	
Yuri Maltsev	Chargé d'affaires	1924	1924	
Mikhail Kobetsky	Diplomatic representative	21 June 1924	10 December 1924	
Adolf Petrovsky	Diplomatic representative	10 December 1924	31 January 1930	
Aleksandr Gambarov	Chargé d'affaires	1924	1 January 1927	
Fyodor Raskolnikov	Diplomatic representative	6 March 1930	18 August 1933	
Aleksei Ustinov	Diplomatic representative	27 January 1934	26 September 1937	
Kuzma Nikitin	Diplomatic representative	1 November 1937	10 July 1940	
Vladimir Bochkaryov	Diplomatic representative	29 July 1940	6 August 1940	

=== Russian Federation to Estonia (1992–present) ===
Name	Title	Appointment	Termination	Notes
Aleksandr Kuznetsov	Ambassador	24 January 1992	1 September 1992	
Aleksandr Trofimov	Ambassador	1 September 1992	23 July 1997	
Aleksei Glukhov	Ambassador	23 July 1997	15 September 2000	
Konstantin Provalov	Ambassador	15 September 2000	25 July 2006	
Nikolai Uspensky	Ambassador	25 July 2006	14 July 2010	
Yuri Merzlyakov	Ambassador	14 July 2010	18 August 2015	
Aleksandr Petrov	Ambassador	18 August 2015	14 December 2021	
Vladimir Lipayev	Ambassador	14 December 2021	23 January 2023	Declared Persona non grata
