= Embassy of Russia, Budapest =

Embassy of Russia in Budapest Russian: Посольство Российской Федерации в Венгрии Hungarian: Oroszország budapesti nagykövetsége
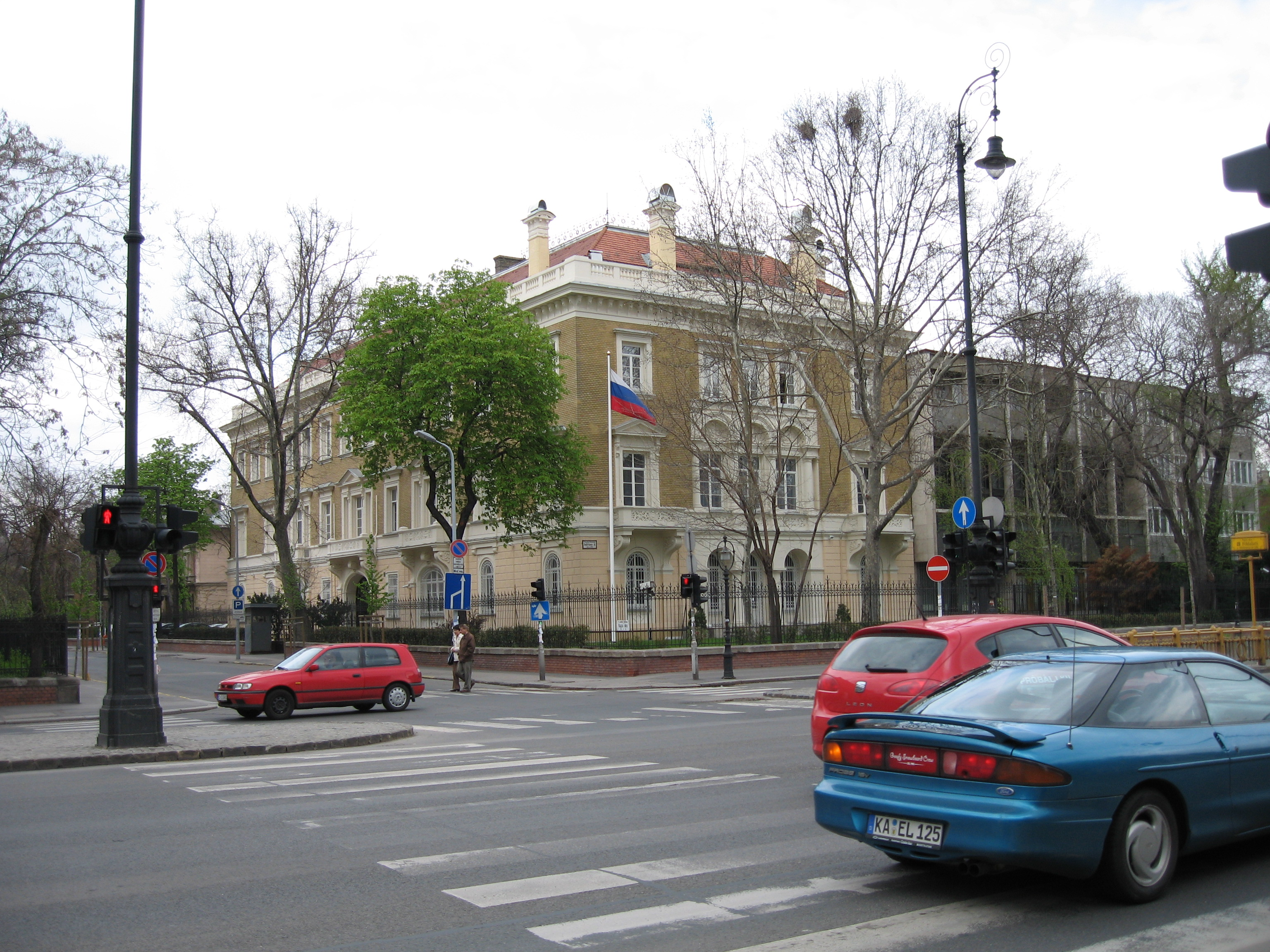
- Location: 6th District, Budapest, Hungary
- Address: Bajza u. 35., Andrássy út 104., Terézváros, Budapest
- Ambassador: Yevgeny Stanislavov
- Website: hungary.mid.ru

Embassy of Russia in Budapest（Russian: Посольство Российской Федерации в Венгрии, romanized: Posolstvo Rossiyskoy Federatsii v Vengrii; Hungarian: Oroszország budapesti nagykövetsége）is the official diplomatic mission of the Russian Federation in the Republic of Hungary. The embassy was originally opened in 1934 as the Soviet embassy in Budapest, and became the Russian embassy after the dissolution of the Soviet Union.

== Background ==
During the time of the Austro-Hungarian Empire, the embassy of the Russian Empire only operated in Vienna, but it also kept a consulate in Budapest. The exact date of the establishment is not known, although it is between 1870 and 1875, since in 1870 there are reports of the plan to open the consulate, and in 1875 a consul general was already mentioned to be stationed in Budapest. In 1880, it is known that the consulate was at 2 V. Eötvös tér.

During the First World War, Russia and Austro-Hungary were warring states, and therefore had terminated their diplomatic relationship. Following the Russian Revolution, Hungary did not want to be associated with a communist state, owing to its own past of the brief Hungarian Soviet Republic. However, relations warmed between the two by 1924, and diplomatic relations were established that year. In 1934, the Soviet embassy in Budapest was opened, and continued until the Dissolution of the Soviet Union in 1991.

== History ==
Since 1991, Hungary quickly established diplomatic relations with post-Soviet states, including the Russian Federation, which became official on December 6, 1991.

The House of Soviet Science and Culture on V. Semmelweis Street moved from its location in downtown Budapest in 1993, and renamed as the "Russian Cultural Center". Currently, the Center operates at Andrássy út 120, where the embassy club used to be located. The ceremonial opening of the cultural center took place on January 28, 1994.

The embassy building, today's building complex at Andrássy út 102–Bajza utca 35, has been in Soviet and later Russian ownership since 1945, which was the former residence of László Széchenyi and his wife Gladys Vanderbilt. Coincidentally, Széchenyi himself worked as a diplomat, and he was Hungary's first ambassador to the United States.

The Soviet Union opened a consulate in Debrecen in 1980. Russia continued to operate it from 1991, but then closed it in 1998 for financial reasons. In 2001, Hungary introduced a visa requirement for Russia, and Russia reopened the consulate later that year.

== Staff ==
The official diplomatic directory of the Hungarian Ministry for Foreign Affairs says the diplomatic staff of the Embassy of the Russian Federation consists of 47 people in 2026. According to the independent Russian investigative outlet Agentstvo half of the staff at Russia’s embassy in Hungary may have had ties to intelligence services. Fifteen embassy employees have confirmed connections to the intelligence services and six more are suspected of having such links, based on an analysis of leaked data spanning several years.

== See also ==
- List of ambassadors of Russia to Hungary
- Hungary–Russia relations
- Embassy of Hungary, Moscow
- List of diplomatic missions of Russia
- List of diplomatic missions in Hungary
