= Embassy of Indonesia, Budapest =

Embassy of the Republic of Indonesia in Budapest Kedutaan Besar Republik Indonesia di Budapest Indonéz Köztársaság Nagykövetsége Budapesten

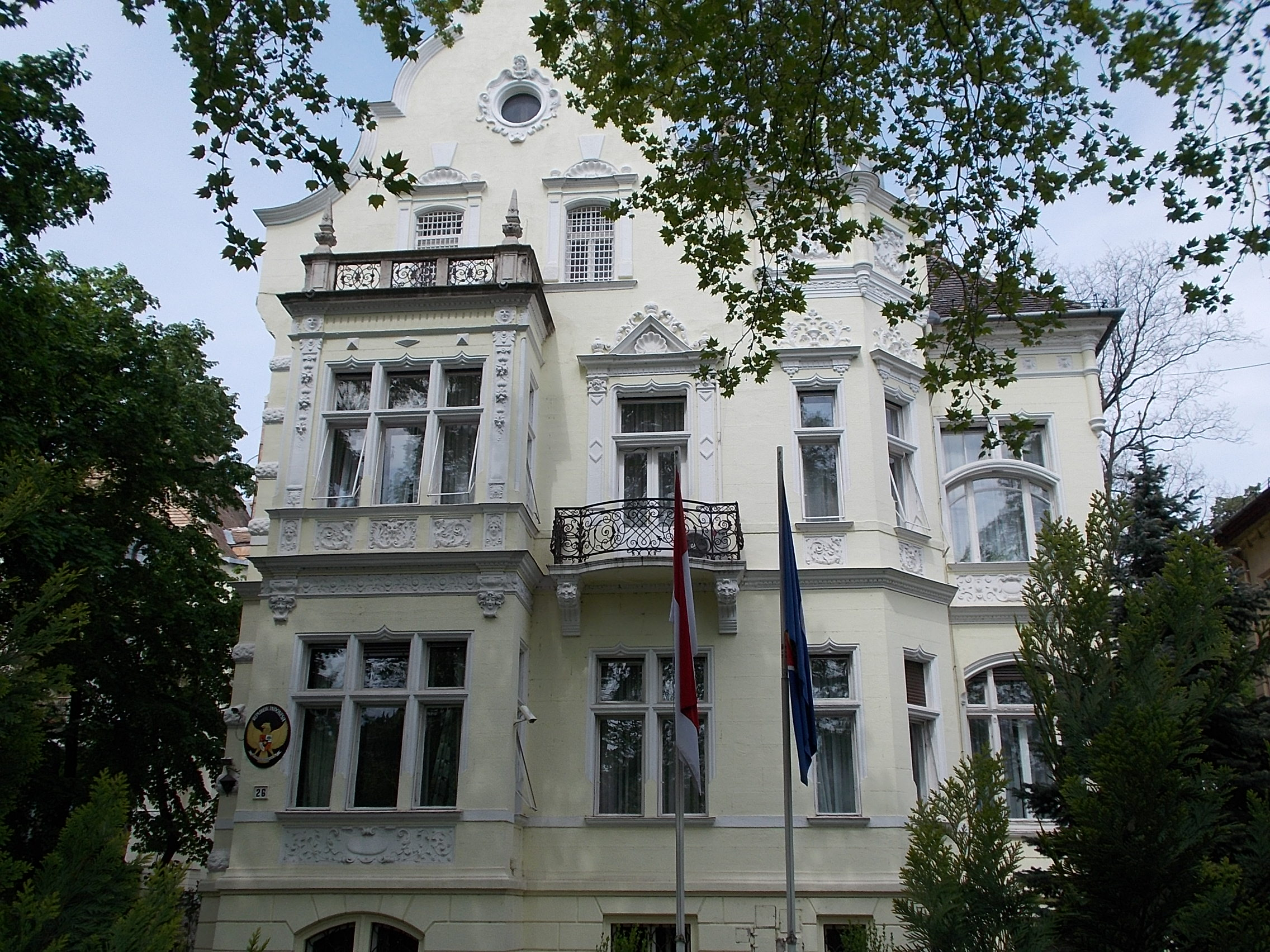
- Location: Budapest, Hungary
- Address: Varosligeti fasor 26; 1068 Budapest, Hungary
- Coordinates: 47.5095366°N 19.0763508°E
- Ambassador: Abdurachman Hudiono Dimas Wahab
- Website: kemlu.go.id/budapest/en/

The Embassy of the Republic of Indonesia in Budapest (Indonesian: Kedutaan Besar Republik Indonesia di Budapest; Hungarian: Indonéz Köztársaság Nagykövetsége Budapesten) is the diplomatic mission of the Republic of Indonesia to the Republic of Hungary. The first Indonesian ambassador to Hungary was Sarino Mangunpranoto (1962–1966). The current ambassador, Abdurachman Hudiono Dimas Wahab, was appointed by President Joko Widodo on 7 January 2019.

== History ==
Diplomatic relations between Indonesia and Hungary were established on 26 June 1955. Burhanuddin Mohammad Diah, the Indonesian ambassador to Czechoslovakia was appointed non-resident ambassador to Hungary on 13 November 1959. On 30 March 1960, the Indonesian embassy in Budapest opened with Chargé d'affaires R. Iman Surjakusuma acting as head of the mission until the arrival of Sarino Mangunpranoto on 10 August 1962 as the first Indonesian ambassador to Hungary.

The embassy in Budapest has also been accredited to the Republic of Bosnia and Herzegovina, the Republic of Croatia, and the Republic of North Macedonia. Bilateral relations between Indonesia and Bosnia and Herzegovina were established on 20 May 1992. Subsequently, in New York on 11 April 1994, a joint communiqué was signed by Indonesian ambassador to the United Nations, Nugroho Wisnumurti, and Vice President Ejup Ganic of Bosnia and Herzegovina. On 8 February 1995, the Indonesian ambassador to Hungary and non-resident ambassador to Bosnia and Herzegovina, Soelaeman Pringgodigdo, presented his credentials to the President Alija Izetbegovic of Bosnia and Herzegovina.

Diplomatic relations between Indonesia and Croatia were established on 2 September 1992 with the signing of a communiqué in Jakarta, Indonesia. On 11 October 1994, Ambassador Pringgodigdo also presented his credentials to President Franjo Tuđman of Croatia. Regarding North Macedonia, on 13 March 2007, the Indonesian ambassador to Hungary and non-resident ambassador to North Macedonia, Mangasi Sihombing, presented his credentials to President Branko Crvenkovski of North Macedonia.

In 2010, after the opening of Indonesian embassies in Sarajevo, Bosnia and Herzegovina, and Zagreb, Croatia, the embassy in Budapest no longer was accredited to these two countries. In 2015, the Indonesian government transferred the accreditation of North Macedonia to the Indonesian embassy in Sofia, Bulgaria.

== See also ==
- Hungary–Indonesia relations
- List of diplomatic missions of Indonesia
- List of diplomatic missions in Hungary
