= Alexander Prishchepov =

Russian diplomat

Alexander Lvovich Prishchepov (Russian: Александр Львович Прищепов; born 29 July 1948) is a career diplomat and was the Ambassador Extraordinary and Plenipotentiary of the Russian Federation to the Republic of Albania between 2005 and 2010.

Prishchepov graduated from the Moscow State Institute of International Relations in 1971, and went on to work in various diplomatic posts in the central offices of the Ministry of Foreign Affairs and abroad.

On 26 August 2005, Prishchepov was appointed as Ambassador of Russia to Albania.

Prishchepov speaks Russian, English, French and Turkish.
