= Embassy of Hungary, Moscow =

Hungarian embassy in Moscow

Embassy of Hungary in Moscow Hungarian: Magyarország moszkvai nagykövetsége Russian: Посольство Венгрии в России
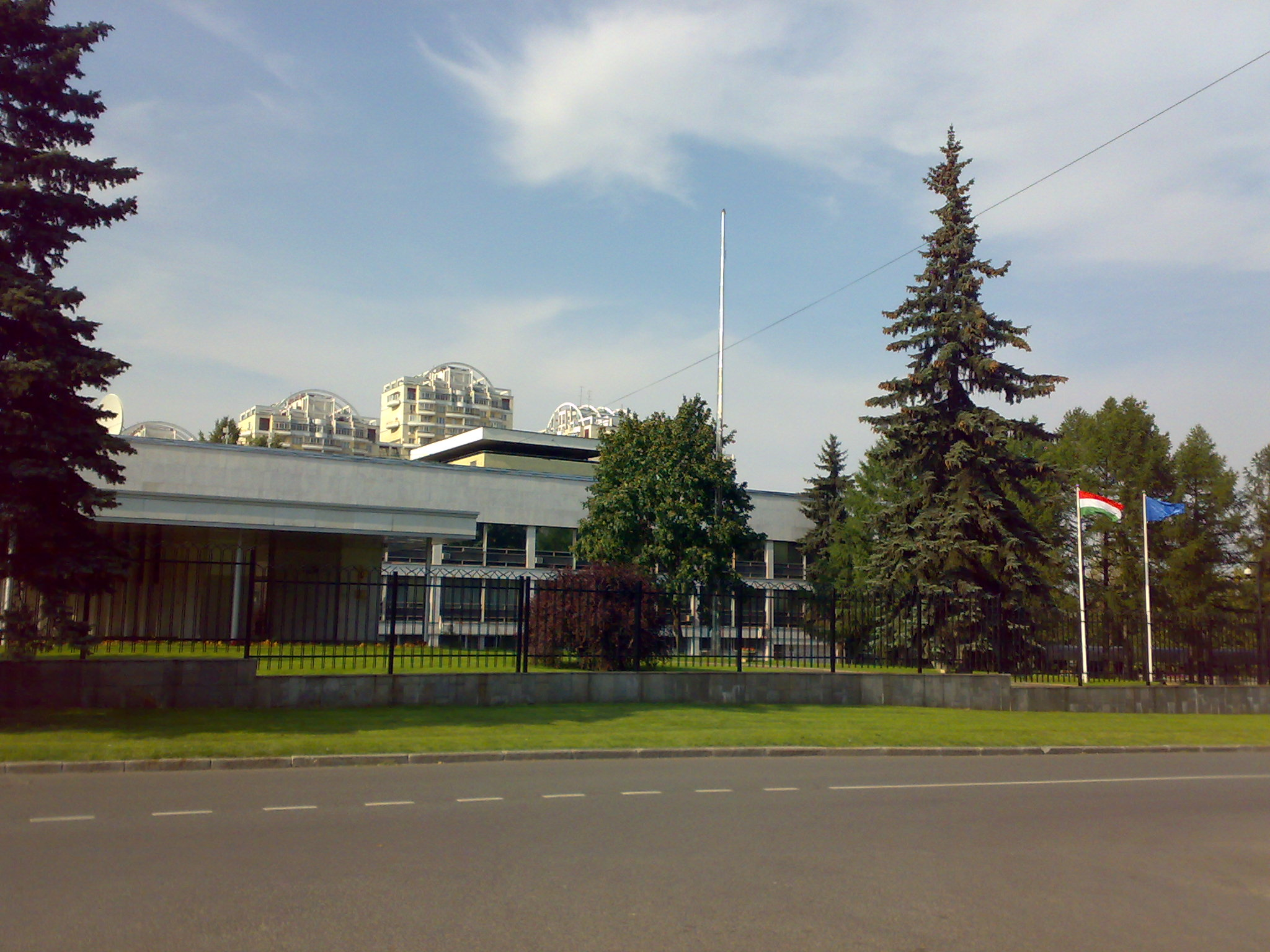
- Location: Ramenki District, Moscow, Russia
- Address: 62 Mosfilmovskaya Street, Ramenki District, Moscow
- Coordinates: 55°42′56″N 37°30′49″E
- Ambassador: Norbert Konkoly
- Website: moszkva.mfa.gov.hu

Embassy of Hungary in Moscow（Hungarian: Magyarország moszkvai nagykövetsége ; Russian: Посольство Венгрии в России）is the official diplomatic mission of the Republic of Hungary in the Russian Federation. The embassy is located at 62 Mosfilmovskaya Street, Ramenki District, Moscow, and the current ambassador is Norbert Konkoly.

== Background ==
During the First World War, the Austro-Hungarian Empire and the Russian Empire participated as enemies, so any previous diplomatic relations have been severed. In August 1918, Austria-Hungary sent a diplomat to Moscow to negotiate a Prisoner exchange. However, with the revolution of the Hungarian Soviet Republic, it never materialized. Furthermore, this brief revolution led to a sense of resentment in Hungary against the Soviet Union, which led the Hungarians to linger around when it comes to establishing diplomatic relations. In 1922, negotiations officially began in Genoa for diplomatic relations between Hungarians and the Soviets, and an agreement was signed by September 1924 in Berlin. Yet, the Hungarians never ratified the agreement, delaying until 1934, when the diplomatic delegations from the two nations exchanged notes. The Soviets insisted that the Hungarians follow through with their agreement, and only in April 1934 did Hungary officially appoint its first ambassador, Mihály Jungerth-Arnóthy, to Moscow.

== History ==
Hungary sent its first envoy to Moscow in 1934. Mihály Jungerth-Arnóthy, who was transferred from his post in Ankara, arrived in Moscow on April 26, 1934. He was tasked with not only building the organization of the embassy, but also establishing economic relations between the two nations.

In February 1939, Hungary joined the Anti-Comintern Pact, which led to a severance of relations once the Soviets withdrew their ambassador in Budapest. Not long after, with the signing of the Molotov–Ribbentrop Pact, the relations resumed. On September 30, 1939, József Kristóffy (son of the former Minister of the Interior in Hungary) was appointed as ambassador to Moscow. There were claims that his knowledge about diplomacy between the two states was very poor, and that he was only 36th on the list of potential candidates. Regardless, this post never lasted long, as all diplomacy broke off with the commencement of Operation Barbarossa in June 1941.

With the end of the Second World War, Hungary fell within the Soviet sphere of influence, and soon established a communist regime with the influence of the Soviet Union. Because of the Cold War, Hungary's embassy in Moscow became extremely important for maintaining Soviet influence in Hungary. In 1978, a new headquarters was built for a trade representation, where there would be a "foreign trade hotel" in addition to representative offices for Hungarian corporations. This building would later trigger a police investigation and political drama for its sale. Before 1990, Hungary was the fifth most important foreign trade partner of the Soviet Union, but following the end of communism in Hungary, political and economic relations between the two nations have significantly reduced. Today, the two nations mainly partner in the energy market.

== Location ==
Gyula Szekfű was the first ambassador to move into the building at 21 Povarskaya Street near the Kremlin, which housed the embassy's employees until 1967. At the time, the mission's new building, considered modern at the time, was built in at 35 Mosfilmovskaya Street, where the ambassador's residence was also built. The current address is close to this one at 62 Mosfilmovskaya St. The old building now houses Hungarian Cultural Institute.

== See also ==
- Hungary–Russia relations
- Embassy of Russia, Budapest
- List of diplomatic missions of Hungary
- List of diplomatic missions in Russia
