= Russian Telegraph Agency =

State news agency in Soviet Russia

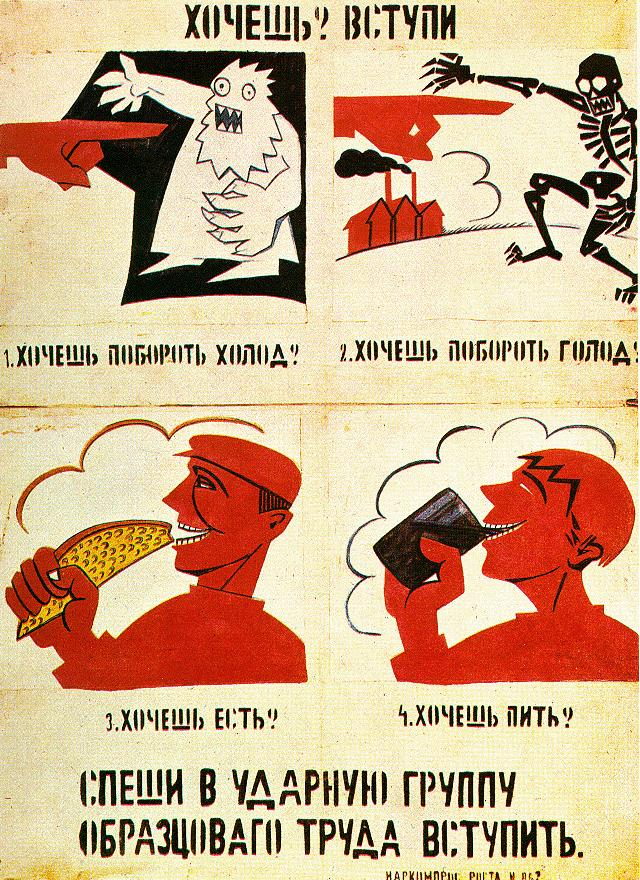
Agitprop poster by Mayakovsky

Russian Telegraph Agency (Russian: Российское телеграфное агентство, РОСТА, romanized: Rossiyskoye telegrafnoye agentstvo, ROSTA) was the state news agency in Soviet Russia between 1918 and 1935. It was the central information organ of the Soviet Union.

After the creation of Telegraph Agency of the Soviet Union in 1925, it remained the news agency of Soviet Russia. Its name was associated with Rosta windows (Russian: Окна Роста, Okna Rosta).

== History ==
In 1904, Minister of Finance Vladimir Kokovtsov argued for a state telegraph news agency by saying that private owners were not reliable. In July 1904, at a meeting of special departments, the project for creating a state telegraph agency was approved. On 1 September 1904, the agency started its work. The agency was located in Petrograd before the revolution. During World War I, the agency changed its name from St. Petersburg Telegraph Agency (SPTA) to Petrograd Telegraph Agency (PTA).

During the October Revolution, Petrograd Telegraph Agency's building was occupied by Baltic sailors under the leadership of Leonid Stark. He transmitted the first reports about the revolution in Russia to all newspapers in the world. On 18 November 1917, Council of People's Commissars decreed that the Petrograd Telegraph Agency will be the central information body.

On 7 September 1918, the All-Russian Central Executive Committee adopted the “Resolution on the merger of the Petrograd Telegraph Agency (PTA) and the Press Bureau under the All-Russian Central Executive Committee”. The new agency was named the Russian Telegraph Agency (ROSTA) under the All-Russian Central Executive Committee. The technical base of ROSTA was made up of the structures of the Petrograd Telegraph Agency (PTA) and private news agencies. The resolution of the Council of People's Commissars of the RSFSR required all media to reprint the decrees of the Soviet government and the latest news received through ROSTA channels. It moved first to Metropol Hotel, Moscow, and then to a separate building on Milyutinsky Lane. On 23 December, Belarusian Branch of the Russian Telegraph Agency (BELOTROSTA) was opened on Zakharyevskaya street in Minsk.

On 12 December 1920, the agency was subordinated to Glavpolitprosvet. In 1919, agency had only 42 branches, and then by 1922 there were already 474 branches and correspondent offices. This allowed the Russian Telegraph to supply the capital and provincial periodicals with new information as quickly as possible. The agency then changed its addresses to Armenian Lane in 1923.

After the creation of the Telegraph Agency of the Soviet Union (TASS) on July 10, 1925, ROSTA functioned as the news agency of the RSFSR. In March 1935, by decree of the All-Russian Central Executive Committee and the Council of People's Commissars of the RSFSR, ROSTA was liquidated, and its functions were transferred to TASS.

== Activity ==
In addition to disseminating information via telegraph channels, ROSTA in 1918-1920 printed its own publications: the newspaper “AgitROSTA", the magazines "Krasnaya Zvezda” and “Red Journalist”, which were published once or twice a week, as well as large-circulated newspapers.

=== Rosta windows ===
Rosta windows or satirical Rosta windows (Russian: Окна сатиры Роста, Okna satiry Rosta) were stencil-replicated propaganda posters created by artists and poets within the Rosta system, under the supervision of the Chief Committee of Political Education during 1919–21. Inheriting the Russian design traditions of lubok and rayok, the main topics were current political events. They were usually displayed in windows, hence the name.

The first Rosta window was created in Moscow by Mikhail Cheremnykh (1890–1962). He was soon joined by Vladimir Mayakovsky, a popular and prolific author, Dmitry Moor, Amshey Nurenberg, Alexander Rodchenko, Mikhail Volpin and others. Similar projects were performed in other Soviet cities. Cheremnykh and Mayakovsky, for example, produced a poster in 1921 satirising a French delegation led by Joseph Noulens.

The design featured graphical simplicity suitable for viewing from distance and often used lubok-styled sequences of pictures according to some plot, similar to modern comics. The posters were not printed but rather painted with cut-out stencils made from cardboard. Once the required number of posters was painted, the stencils were sent to another city and put in circulation throughout the Soviet Union.

During the World War II, this approach was reproduced in Tass windows by Kukryniksy.

== See also ==
- Media of Russia

== Bibliography ==
- Ward, Alex (2008). Power to the People: Early Soviet Propaganda Posters in the Israel Museum, Jerusalem. London, UK, Ashgate, ISBN 0-85331-981-2
