= Nikolai Sharonov =

Soviet diplomat

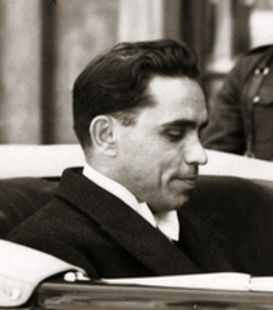
Nikolai Sharonow

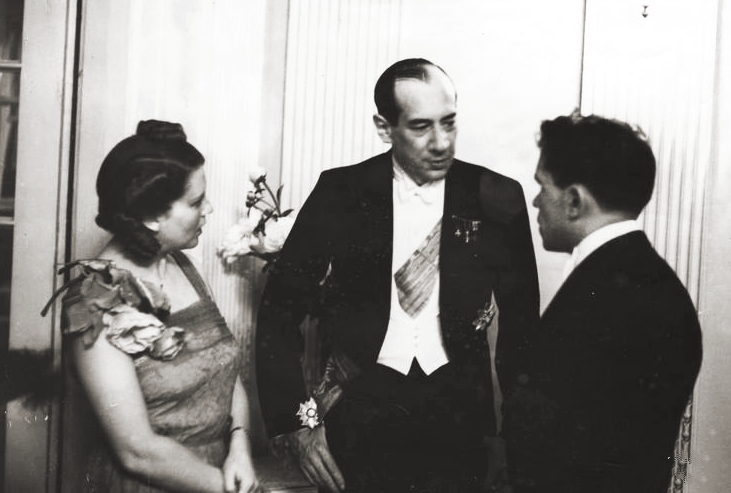
Sharonov and his wife talking with Józef Beck, Polish Foreign Affairs Minister (June 1939)

Nikolai Ivanovich Sharonov (Russian: Николай Иванович Шаронов, Polish: Nikołaj Szaronow) (born 1901, date of death unknown) was a Soviet diplomat.

Plenipotentiary (полпред) on a shared basis, sometimes via third countries, in Greece (1937–1939), Albania (1937–1939), Poland (1939) and Hungary (1939–1941).

He was the last Soviet ambassador in the Second Polish Republic (replacing Yakov Davydov, executed in the Great Purge). He took this post in May 1939. Officially, in light of growing Polish-German tensions, he supported the Polish government, offering to discuss Soviet economic and military aid; In fact the Soviets were pressured by Nazi Germany to act upon their alliance (Ribbentrop-Molotov Pact); Soviet propaganda was already accusing Poland of border violations and mistreatment of Belarusian and Ukrainian minorities, and mobilization was ordered on September 7. It is not certain whether Sharonov was aware of larger Soviet policy and was acting in good faith, without consulting with the Soviet government, or whether he was trying to divert Polish government attention from Soviet preparations. Sharonov and his military attaché, Pavel Rybalko, left Poland on 11 or 12 September 1939, less than a week before the Soviet Union invaded Poland. Sharonov's official reason for leaving the Polish capital of Warsaw was "the troubles in establishing communications with Moscow" due to the ongoing German invasion of Poland that had begun on September 1.
