= List of ambassadors of Russia to Hungary =

Ambassador of the Russian Federation to Hungary
- Oroszországi Föderáció Nagykövetsége Magyarországon
- Emblem of the Russian Foreign Ministry
- Incumbent; Yevgeny Stanislavov since 18 February 2021
- Ministry of Foreign Affairs; Embassy of Russia in Budapest
- Style: His Excellency; The Honourable
- Reports to: Minister of Foreign Affairs
- Seat: Budapest
- Appointer: President of Russia
- Term length: At the pleasure of the president
- Website: Embassy of Russia in Budapest

The ambassador extraordinary and plenipotentiary of the Russian Federation to Hungary is the official representative of the president and the government of the Russian Federation to the president and the government of Hungary.

The ambassador and his staff work at large in the Embassy of Russia in Budapest. There is a consulate-general in Debrecen. The current Russian ambassador to Hungary is Yevgeny Stanislavov, appointed on 18 February 2021.

== History of diplomatic relations ==
Diplomatic relations existed between the Russian Empire and the Austro-Hungarian Empire and previous incarnations, with ambassadors exchanged from the eighteenth century onwards. Both empires ceased to exist after the First World War. Russia underwent the February and then the October Revolution in 1917, bringing the Bolsheviks to power and leading to the creation of the Soviet Union. The dissolution of Austria-Hungary created two separate countries, with Hungary passing through the brief states of the First Hungarian Republic, the Hungarian Soviet Republic, the Hungarian Republic, and by 1920, the Kingdom of Hungary. Diplomatic relations were restored on 5 September 1924, with Yakov Davydov appointed as diplomatic representative, but the treaty to exchange representatives was ultimately not ratified by Hungary. It was not until 4 February 1934 that an agreement was reached to establish diplomatic missions, and Adolf Petrovsky, the incumbent Soviet ambassador to Austria, was given dual accreditation to Hungary. The first ambassador solely accredited to Hungary was Alexander Bekzadyan, appointed on 17 November 1934.

Representation continued until 1939, when the increasing influence and closeness of Hungary with Nazi Germany caused the closing of the missions on 2 February 1939. Representation was through third countries until the missions reopened on 25 October 1939. On 22 June 1941, Operation Barbarossa, the Axis invasion of the Soviet Union began. Hungary was part of the Axis powers, and broke off relations with the Soviet Union on 23 June. Relations remained suspended throughout the rest of the war. With the defeat of the Axis powers, and the Soviet occupation of Hungary, diplomatic relations were restored on 25 September 1945. Relations were initially through envoys, but were upgraded to the level of embassies on 2 March 1948. Representation continued during the Cold War, during which time the Hungarian People's Republic was formed, and became part of the Warsaw Pact. The communist government came to an end in 1989, with the disintegration of the Eastern bloc, and the dissolution of the Soviet Union occurred in 1991. Hungary recognised Russia as the Soviet Union's successor state, and the incumbent Soviet ambassador, Ivan Aboimov, continued as representative of Russia until 1996.

== List of representatives (1924–present) ==
=== Soviet Union to the Kingdom of Hungary (1924–1946) ===
Name	Title	Appointment	Termination	Notes
Yakov Davydov	Diplomatic representative	1924	1924	
Treaty not ratified, no representation (1924 - 1934)
Adolf Petrovsky	Diplomatic representative	2 April 1934	11 November 1934	Credentials presented on 9 April 1934; Concurrently ambassador to Austria
Alexander Bekzadyan	Diplomatic representative	17 November 1934	20 November 1937	Credentials presented on 23 December 1934
Viktor Plotnikov	Chargé d'affaires	September 1937	March 1939	
Missions closed (2 February - 25 October 1939)
Nikolai Sharonov	Diplomatic representative before 9 May 1941; Envoy after 9 May 1941	26 October 1939	23 June 1941	Credentials presented on 7 December 1939
Second World War, no representation (1941-1945)
Georgy Pushkin	Envoy	1 October 1945	1 February 1946	Credentials presented on 2 November 1945

=== Soviet Union to the Second Hungarian Republic (1946–1949) ===
Name	Title	Appointment	Termination	Notes
Georgy Pushkin	Envoy before 28 March 1948; Ambassador after 28 March 1948	1 February 1946	28 June 1949	
Arseny Tishkov	Ambassador	28 June 1949	20 August 1949	Credentials presented on 8 July 1949

=== Soviet Union to the Hungarian People's Republic (1949–1989) ===
Name	Title	Appointment	Termination	Notes
Arseny Tishkov	Ambassador	20 August 1949	20 November 1949	
Yevgeny Kiselyov	Ambassador	20 November 1949	15 July 1954	Credentials presented on 25 February 1950
Yuri Andropov	Ambassador	15 July 1954	7 March 1957	Credentials presented on 26 July 1954
Yevgeny Gromov	Ambassador	7 March 1957	31 May 1959	Credentials presented on 14 March 1957
Terentii Shtykov	Ambassador	31 May 1959	6 July 1960	Credentials presented on 11 July 1959
Vladimir Ustinov	Ambassador	6 July 1960	12 January 1963	Credentials presented on 17 September 1960
Georgy Denisov	Ambassador	12 January 1963	19 January 1966	Credentials presented on 8 February 1963
Fyodor Titov	Ambassador	19 January 1966	18 March 1971	Credentials presented on 18 March 1966
Vladimir Pavlov	Ambassador	18 March 1971	18 January 1982	Credentials presented on 24 March 1971
Vladimir Bazovsky	Ambassador	18 January 1982	9 July 1985	Credentials presented on 18 February 1982
Boris Stukalin	Ambassador	9 July 1985	23 October 1989	

=== Soviet Union to Hungary (1989–1991) ===
Name	Title	Appointment	Termination	Notes
Boris Stukalin	Ambassador	23 October 1989	8 June 1990	
Ivan Aboimov	Ambassador	8 June 1990	25 December 1991	

=== Russian Federation to Hungary (1991–present) ===
Name	Title	Appointment	Termination	Notes
Ivan Aboimov	Ambassador	25 December 1991	15 November 1996	
Feliks Bogdanov	Ambassador	15 November 1996	21 April 2000	
Valery Musatov	Ambassador	21 April 2000	17 January 2006	
Igor Savolsky	Ambassador	17 January 2006	23 September 2009	
Aleksandr Tolkach	Ambassador	23 September 2009	24 September 2014	
Vladimir Sergeyev	Ambassador	24 September 2014	18 February 2021	
Yevgeny Stanislavov	Ambassador	18 February 2021		
