= Adolf Petrovsky =

Soviet diplomat (1887–1937)

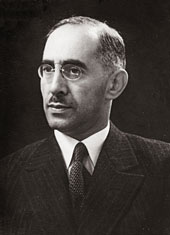
Adolf Petrovsky

Adolf Markovich Petrovsky (Russian: Адольф Маркович Петровский; 1887 – 17 September 1937) was a Soviet diplomat.

== Career ==
Petrovsky was born in 1887 in Warsaw, then part of Vistula Land in the Russian Empire. From 10 December 1924 until 31 January 1930, Petrovsky was the Plenipotentiary Representative of the Soviet Union in Estonia. From 31 January 1930 to 21 December 1930, he was the Plenipotentiary Representative of the USSR in Lithuania. From 21 December 1930 until 1 April 1933, he was the Plenipotentiary Representative of the USSR in Persia.

From 1 April 1933 until 10 November 1935, he was the Plenipotentiary Representative of the Soviet Union in Austria, with concurrent accreditation as the Plenipotentiary Representative of the USSR in Hungary.

Petrovsky was arrested during Joseph Stalin's Great Purge in 1937.

Diplomatic posts
Preceded by Mikhail Kobetsky	Plenipotentiary Representative of the Soviet Union in Estonia; 1924–1930	Succeeded by Fyodor Raskolnikov
Preceded by Vladimir Antonov-Ovseyenko	Plenipotentiary Representative of the Soviet Union in Lithuania; 1930	Succeeded by Mikhail Karsky
Preceded by Yakov Davydov	Plenipotentiary Representative of the Soviet Union in Persia; 1930–1933	Succeeded by Sergey Pastukhov
Preceded by Konstantin Yurenev	Plenipotentiary Representative of the Soviet Union in Austria and Hungary; 1933–1935	Succeeded by Ivan Lorents
