= Konstantin Provalov (diplomat) =

Soviet and Russian diplomat (1949–2021)

- Константин Провалов

Ambassador of Russia to Estonia
- In office 15 September 2000 – 25 July 2006
- Preceded by: Aleksei Glukhov
- Succeeded by: Nikolai Uspensky

Personal details
- Born: 30 September 1949 Moscow, Russian SFSR, Soviet Union
- Died: 9 April 2021 (aged 71)
- Education: Moscow State Institute of International Relations; Diplomatic Academy of the Ministry of Foreign Affairs of the Russian Federation
- Awards: Order of the Cross of Terra Mariana First Class

Konstantin Konstantinovich Provalov (Russian: Константин Константинович Провалов; 30 September 1949 – 9 April 2021) was a Soviet and Russian diplomat. He served in various diplomatic roles from 1973 onwards, and was Ambassador of Russia to Estonia between 2000 and 2006.

== Career ==
Provalov was born on 30 September 1949 in Moscow, then part of the Russian Soviet Federative Socialist Republic, in the Soviet Union. He studied at Moscow State Institute of International Relations, graduating in 1972 with a degree in International Relations, and entered diplomatic service. In addition to his native Russian, he spoke Bengali and English. Provalov's early service was spent holding various diplomatic posts in the Soviet, and later the Russian Ministry of Foreign Affairs, and in the department's foreign missions and embassies abroad. His first posting, in 1972, was as an assistant in the Ministry's South Asia Department, and was followed by postings to Bangladesh and Myanmar. He also spent an extended period in the apparatus of the Central Committee of the Communist Party of the Soviet Union. In the late 1980s he undertook further studies at the Academy of Social Sciences of the Central Committee of the Communist Party of the Soviet Union, graduating in 1989.

In 1996 Provalov became deputy director of the department of the Executive Secretariat, and deputy executive secretary of the Foreign Ministry. He held the position until April 1999, when he became deputy director of General Secretariat, and deputy secretary general of the Foreign Ministry. He had been appointed to the diplomatic rank of Envoy Extraordinary and Plenipotentiary Second Class on 9 July 1998. During this time he studied at Diplomatic Academy of the Ministry of Foreign Affairs of the Russian Federation, graduating from its Higher Diplomatic Courses in 2000.

On 15 September 2000 Provalov was appointed Russian ambassador to Estonia, holding the post until 25 July 2006. On his recall, he became director of the Ministry's Historical and Documentary Department, during which time he was promoted to Envoy Extraordinary and Plenipotentiary First Class on 28 November 2007. He remained with the Historical Department until 2012, when he was appointed Russia's consul general in Karlovy Vary, in the Czech Republic. This was his last foreign posting, which he held until 2015.

Provalov died on 9 April 2021. Over his career he had received several awards and honours, including the Certificate of Honour of the Ministry of Foreign Affairs and the title of Honoured Worker of the Ministry of Foreign Affairs of Russia. He was also awarded the Order of the Cross of Terra Mariana First Class by Estonia, announced on 18 August 2006 and presented on 22 August 2006. His obituary by the Russian Ministry of Foreign Affairs described him as "distinguished by diligence, dedication, a responsible approach to business, and an attentive attitude towards others."
