= List of ambassadors of Russia to Greece =

Ambassador of the Russian Federation to the Hellenic Republic
- Emblem of the Russian Foreign Ministry
- Incumbent; Andrey Maslov since 12 July 2014
- Ministry of Foreign Affairs; Embassy of Russia in Athens
- Style: His Excellency; The Honourable
- Reports to: Minister of Foreign Affairs
- Seat: Athens
- Appointer: President of Russia
- Term length: At the pleasure of the president
- Website: Embassy of Russia in Greece

The ambassador of Russia to Greece is the official representative of the president and the government of the Russian Federation to the president and the government of Greece.

The ambassador and his staff work at large in the Russian embassy in Athens. There is a consulate-general in Thessaloniki, and honorary consuls in Alexandroupoli, Corfu, Heraklion, Lamia, Nafplio and Patras. The current Russian ambassador to Greece is Andrey Maslov, incumbent since 12 July 2014.

== History of diplomatic relations ==
Diplomatic relations between the forerunners of the modern states of Greece and Russia date back to the early nineteenth century. The Russian Empire supported the Greek independence movement against the Ottoman Empire during the eighteenth century, with Catherine the Great's Greek Project and support for the Orlov revolt during the Russo-Turkish war. Early attempts to establish an independent Greek state ended in failure, until the Russian-backed Greek War of Independence in the 1820s resulted in the establishment of the First Hellenic Republic, through which the Russian Party-supporting Greek leaders enjoyed considerable power. The Russian empire established relations with the First Hellenic Republic on 6 September [N.S. 18 September] 1828. The first mission was based in Nafplio from 1828, before moving to Athens in 1834 with the establishment of the Kingdom of Greece.

Relations between the two countries were maintained during the nineteenth and into the twentieth centuries, and after the February Revolution in 1917 overthrew the Russian monarchy and established the Russian Provisional Government. Relations were however broken off after the October Revolution brought the Bolshevik regime to power. Relations were restored between what was by then the Soviet Union and the Second Hellenic Republic on 8 March 1924, and Aleksey Ustinov was appointed the first plenipotentiary representative. Relations were maintained until the Axis occupation of Greece in June 1941. The Soviet Union joined the Allied side following the Axis invasion of the Soviet Union later in June, and established relations with the Greek government-in-exile in London as part of the Soviet embassy to the Allied governments. The Greek government moved to Cairo in 1943, and representation was transferred to the Soviet embassy in Cairo, with the Soviet ambassador to Egypt given dual accreditation to the Greek government. This lasted until the return of the Greek government to Greece after the war, and in 1945 Konstantin Rodionov was appointed the ambassador to Greece.

With the dissolution of the Soviet Union in 1991, Greece recognised the Russian Federation as its successor state on 27 December 1991.

== List of representatives of Russia to Greece (1828–present) ==
=== Russian Empire to Greece (1828–1917) ===
Name	Title	Appointment	Termination	Notes
Mark Bulgari	Special representative	2 July 1828	31 March 1829	
Viktor Panin	Chargé d'affaires	31 March 1829	7 May 1831	
Pyotr Rikman	Chargé d'affaires	27 December 1830	4 June 1833	
Gavriil Katakazi	Special representative before 31 July 1833; Envoy after 31 July 1833	13 December 1832	16 October 1843	
Ivan Persiani	Chargé d'affaires	11 November 1843	9 January 1857	
Aleksandr Ozerov	Envoy	9 January 1857	25 October 1861	
Andrey Bludov	Envoy	25 October 1861	30 August 1865	
Yevgeny Novikov	Envoy	30 August 1865	29 May 1870	
Peter Saburov	Envoy	29 May 1870	22 December 1879	
Mikhail Bartolomey	Envoy	26 April 1880	16 June 1880	
Nikolai Shishkin	Envoy	16 June 1880	8 February 1884	
Yevgeny Byutsov	Envoy	9 February 1884	15 November 1889	
Mikhail Onu	Envoy	15 November 1889	20 May 1901	
Roman Rosen	Envoy	1 June 1901	1902	
Yuri Shcherbachyov	Envoy	12 November 1902	17 May 1910	
Sergey Sverbeyev	Envoy	1910	1912	
Elim Demidov	Envoy	1912	3 March 1917	

=== Russian Provisional Government to Greece (1917) ===
Name	Title	Appointment	Termination	Notes
Elim Demidov	Envoy	March 1917	26 October 1917	

=== Soviet Union to Greece (1924–1991) ===
Name	Title	Appointment	Termination	Notes
Aleksey Ustinov	Plenipotentiary Representative	7 May 1924	3 November 1929	Credentials presented on 10 June 1924
Vladimir Potemkin	Plenipotentiary Representative	3 November 1929	26 September 1932	Credentials presented on 18 November 1929
Yakov Davydov	Plenipotentiary Representative	27 September 1932	20 March 1934	Credentials presented on 28 October 1932
Mikhail Kobetsky	Plenipotentiary Representative	28 April 1934	28 April 1937	Credentials presented on 26 May 1934
Alexander Barmine	Chargé d'affaires	1937	18 July 1937	
Nikolai Sharonov	Plenipotentiary Representative	18 July 1937	31 May 1939	Credentials presented on 20 October 1937
Mikhail Sergeyev	Chargé d'affaires	1939	3 June 1941	
Aleksandr Bogomolov	Envoy before 14 April 1943; Ambassador after 14 April 1943	3 September 1941	12 November 1943	To the Greek government-in-exile in London as part of the Soviet Embassy to the Allied Governments; Credentials presented on 21 October 1941
Nikolai Novikov	Ambassador	12 November 1943	11 December 1945	To the Greek government-in-exile in Cairo concurrently as ambassador to Egypt; Credentials presented on 9 December 1943
Konstantin Rodionov	Ambassador	11 December 1945	5 September 1947	Credentials presented on 3 January 1946
Mikhail Sergeyev	Ambassador	23 July 1953	5 January 1962	Credentials presented on 19 September 1953
Nikolai Koryukin	Ambassador	5 January 1962	31 May 1968	Credentials presented on 8 March 1962
Kliment Lyovychkin	Ambassador	31 May 1968	1 March 1973	Credentials presented on 4 September 1968
Igor Yezhov	Ambassador	1 March 1973	12 March 1976	Credentials presented on 14 May 1973
Ivan Udaltsov	Ambassador	12 March 1976	11 September 1979	Credentials presented on 13 April 1976
Vladimir Kaboshkin	Ambassador	11 September 1979	1 September 1984	Credentials presented on 18 September 1979
Igor Andropov	Ambassador	1 September 1984	31 January 1986	Credentials presented on 22 October 1984
Viktor Stukalin	Ambassador	31 January 1986	30 May 1988	
Anatoly Slyusar	Ambassador	30 May 1988	25 December 1991	

=== Russian Federation to Greece (1991–present) ===
Name	Title	Appointment	Termination	Notes
Valery Nikolayenko	Ambassador	18 March 1992	17 April 1997	
Valentina Matviyenko	Ambassador	2 October 1997	24 September 1998	
Mikhail Bocharnikov	Ambassador	13 January 1999	10 November 2003	
Andrey Vdovin	Ambassador	17 November 2003	24 December 2008	
Vladimir Chkhikvishvili	Ambassador	24 December 2008	16 June 2014	Credentials presented on 27 February 2009
Andrey Maslov	Ambassador	16 June 2014		

== See also ==
- List of ambassadors of Greece to Russia
