= List of diplomatic missions in Hungary =

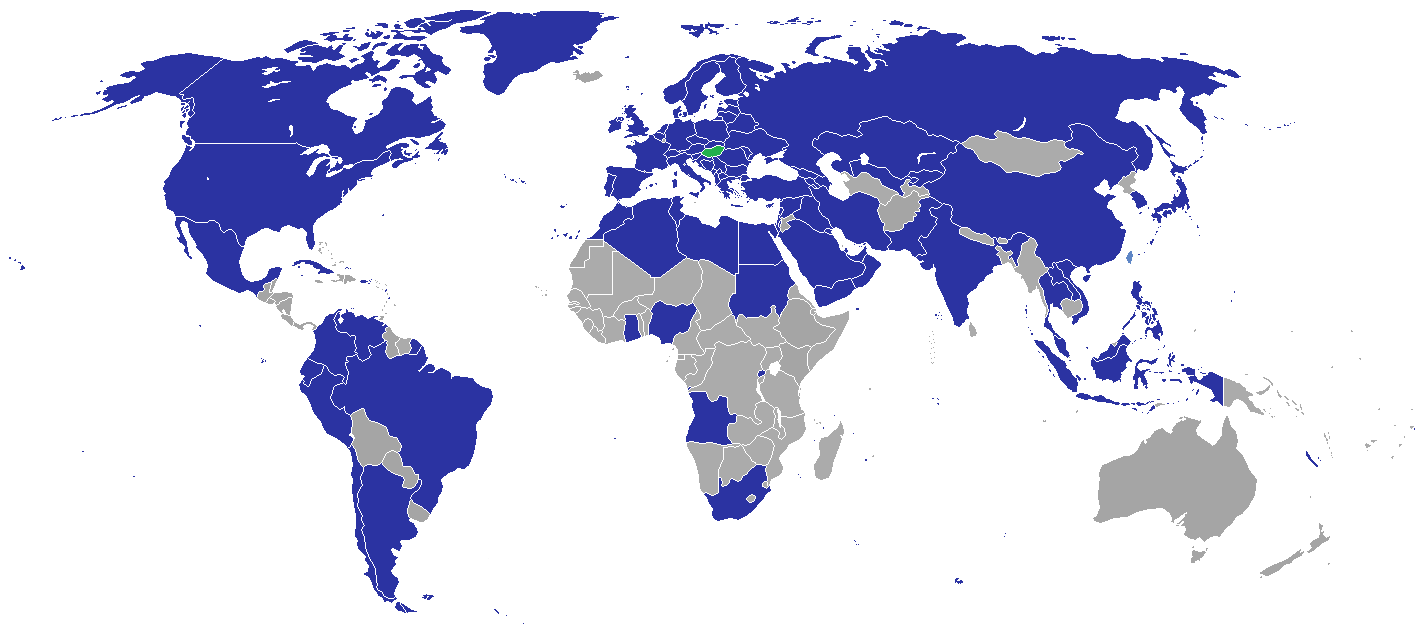
Map of diplomatic missions in Hungary

This article lists diplomatic missions resident in Hungary. At present, the capital city of Budapest hosts 93 embassies. Several other countries have honorary consuls to provide emergency services to their citizens and several countries have non-resident embassies accredited from other capitals, such as Vienna and Berlin.

== Diplomatic missions in Budapest ==
=== Embassies ===
| Sending Country | Mission | Photo |
|---|---|---|
| Albania | Embassy | |
| Algeria | Embassy | |
| Angola | Embassy | |
| Argentina | Embassy | |
| Armenia | Embassy | |
| Austria | Embassy | |
| Azerbaijan | Embassy | |
| Belarus | Embassy | |
| Belgium | Embassy | |
| Bosnia and Herzegovina | Embassy | |
| Brazil | Embassy | |
| Bulgaria | Embassy | |
| Canada | Embassy | |
| Chile | Embassy | |
| China | Embassy | |
| Colombia | Embassy | |
| Croatia | Embassy | |
| Cuba | Embassy | |
| Cyprus | Embassy | |
| Czech Republic | Embassy | |
| Denmark | Embassy | |
| Ecuador | Embassy | |
| Egypt | Embassy | |
| Estonia | Embassy | |
| Finland | Embassy | |
| France | Embassy | |
| Georgia | Embassy | |
| Germany | Embassy | |
| Ghana | Embassy | |
| Greece | Embassy | |
| Holy See | Apostolic Nunciature | |
| India | Embassy | |
| Indonesia | Embassy | |
| Iran | Embassy | |
| Iraq | Embassy | |
| Ireland | Embassy | |
| Israel | Embassy | |
| Italy | Embassy | |
| Japan | Embassy | |
| Kazakhstan | Embassy | |
| Kosovo | Embassy | |
| Kuwait | Embassy | |
| Kyrgyzstan | Embassy | |
| Laos | Embassy | |
| Latvia | Embassy | |
| Lebanon | Embassy | |
| Libya | Embassy | |
| Lithuania | Embassy | |
| Malaysia | Embassy | |
| Mexico | Embassy | |
| Moldova | Embassy | |
| Mongolia | Embassy | |
| Montenegro | Embassy | |
| Morocco | Embassy | |
| Netherlands | Embassy | |
| Nigeria | Embassy | |
| North Macedonia | Embassy | |
| Northern Cyprus | Representative Office | |
| Norway | Embassy | |
| Oman | Embassy | |
| Pakistan | Embassy | |
| Palestine | Embassy | |
| Peru | Embassy | |
| Philippines | Embassy | |
| Poland | Embassy | |
| Portugal | Embassy | |
| Qatar | Embassy | |
| Romania | Embassy | |
| Russia | Embassy | |
| Rwanda | Embassy | |
| Saudi Arabia | Embassy | |
| Serbia | Embassy | |
| Slovakia | Embassy | |
| Slovenia | Embassy | |
| South Africa | Embassy | |
| Republic of Korea | Embassy | |
| Sovereign Military Order of Malta | Embassy | |
| Spain | Embassy | |
| Sudan | Embassy | |
| Sweden | Embassy | |
| Switzerland | Embassy | |
| Syria | Embassy | |
| Thailand | Embassy | |
| Tunisia | Embassy | |
| Turkey | Embassy | |
| Ukraine | Embassy | |
| United Arab Emirates | Embassy | |
| United Kingdom | Embassy | |
| United States | Embassy | |
| Uzbekistan | Embassy | |
| Venezuela | Embassy | |
| Vietnam | Embassy | |
| Yemen | Embassy | |

=== Missions or Delegations ===
1. International Committee of the Red Cross (Delegation)
2. Organization of Turkic States (Delegation)
3. Republic of China (Taiwan) (Representative Office)
4. World Health Organization (Country Office)

== Consular missions ==
| Sending Country | Mission | Host city | Photo |
|---|---|---|---|
| Croatia | Consulate-General | Pécs | |
| Romania | Consulate-General | Gyula | |
| Romania | Consulate-General | Szeged | |
| Russia | Consulate-General | Debrecen | |
| Slovakia | Consulate-General | Békéscsaba | |
| Slovenia | Consulate-General | Szentgotthárd | |
| Ukraine | Consulate-General | Nyíregyháza | |

== Accredited embassies ==
=== Resident in Berlin, Germany ===
1. Bahrain
2. Cambodia
3. Chad
4. Congo-Brazzaville
5. Eritrea
6. Jamaica
7. Madagascar
8. Malawi
9. Mauritania
10. Mozambique
11. Nepal
12. Niger
13. Panama
14. Senegal
15. Somalia
16. Tanzania
17. Togo
18. Uganda
19. Zambia
20. Zimbabwe

=== Resident in Brussels, Belgium ===
1. Brunei
2. Cape Verde
3. Seychelles
4. Samoa

=== Resident in Geneva, Switzerland ===
1. Barbados
2. Eswatini
3. Ethiopia

=== Resident in Vienna, Austria ===
1. Afghanistan
2. Andorra
3. Australia
4. Bangladesh
5. Bolivia
6. Burkina Faso
7. Dominican Republic
8. El Salvador
9. Guatemala
10. Honduras
11. Iceland
12. Ivory Coast
13. Jordan
14. Kenya
15. Luxembourg
16. Namibia
17. New Zealand
18. North Korea
19. Paraguay
20. Sri Lanka
21. Tajikistan
22. Turkmenistan
23. Uruguay

=== Resident elsewhere ===
1. Benin (Paris)
2. Burundi (The Hague)
3. Congo-Kinshasa (Warsaw)
4. Haiti (New York City)
5. Gabon (Moscow)
6. Gambia (Paris)
7. Guinea (Moscow}
8. Guinea-Bissau (Lisbon)
9. Lesotho (Rome)
10. Mali (Rome)
11. Malta (Valletta)
12. Myanmar (Prague)
13. San Marino (City of San Marino)
14. Singapore (Singapore)

=== Unconfirmed ===
- Central African Republic (Moscow)
- Maldives (Geneva)
- Sierra Leone (Moscow)
- South Sudan (Berlin)

== Closed missions ==
| Host city | Sending country | Mission | Year closed | Ref. |
|---|---|---|---|---|
| Budapest | Afghanistan | Embassy | 2015 | |
| Budapest | Australia | Embassy | 2013 | |
| Budapest | Cambodia | Embassy | Unknown | |
| Budapest | Malta | Embassy | 2007 | |
| Budapest | North Korea | Embassy | 1995 | |
| Debrecen | Socialist Republic of Romania | Consulate | 1985 | |

== See also ==
- Foreign relations of Hungary
- Visa requirements for Hungarian citizens
