= Embassy of Russia, Tallinn =

Diplomatic mission of Russia to Estonia

Embassy of Russia in Tallinn
- Location: Tallinn
- Address: Plikk 19 Tallinn, Estonia
- Coordinates: 59°26′18.7037″N 24°44′44.0318″E
- Ambassador: vacant

Embassy of Russia in Tallinn is the diplomatic mission of Russia in Estonia.

== History ==
The embassy building is situated in the old medieval quarter of Tallinn Old Town. It was originally built around 1890 as a house and underwent several renovations before becoming an embassy. It was declared a cultural heritage monument in 1997.

The building was first a Soviet embassy in 1921. After WWII it was in use by the Soviet Ministry of the Interior. The Estonian Embassy in Moscow and the Russian Embassy in Tallinn have been operating since independence in 1991, but until 2004 the ownership of buildings and plots owned by embassies and the conditions for their use were unregulated and a draft agreement was made to transfer ownership of the properties. It is unknown whether the draft was signed by either party.

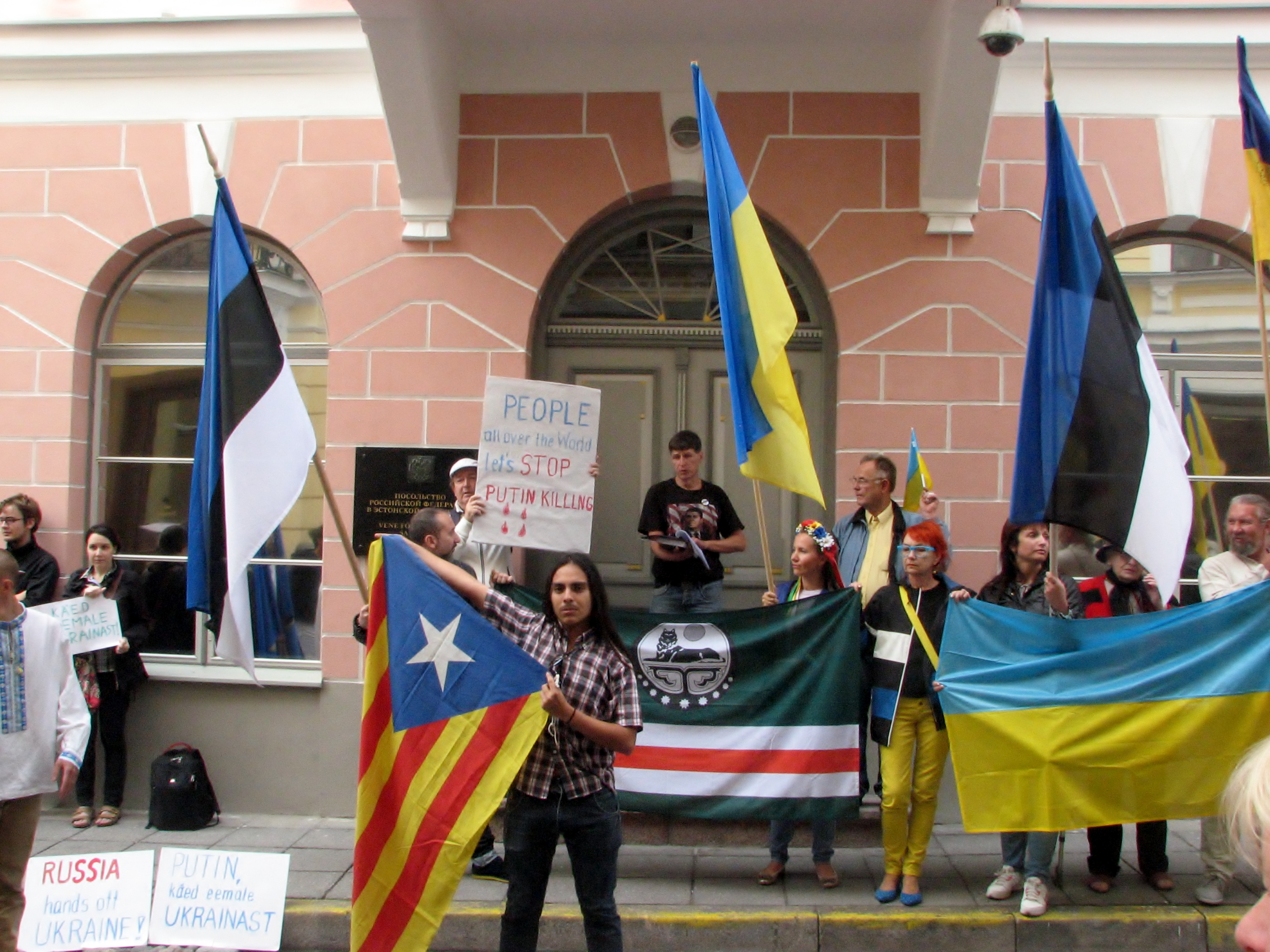
Photo of demonstration protesting Russia's actions in Ukraine, 23 August 2014

Following the Russian Federation's annexation of Crimea in 2014, demonstrations in support of Ukraine were held in front of the embassy to express solidarity with Ukraine and disdain for the annexation.

Diplomatic relations between the two nations soured in the prelude to and during the 2022 Russian invasion of Ukraine. Estonia joined Latvia and Lithuania in expelling Russian diplomats in March 2022. In retaliation, the Russian Embassy posted on its Facebook page that Estonian diplomats would be expelled from Russia.

In April 2022, demonstrations in support of Ukraine where held again in front of the embassy in response to allegations of rape and sexual assault by Russian forces in Ukraine.

In January 2023, Russia recalled its ambassador from Estonia, reasoning that Russia-Estonia relations were being 'purposefully destroyed' by the Estonian side.

== Previous ambassadors ==
- 1992–1997 Aleksandr Trofimov
- 1997–2000 Aleksei Gluhkhov
- 2001–2006 Konstantin Provalov
- 2006–2010 Nikolai Uspensky
- 2010–2015 Yuri Merzlyakov
- 2015–2021 Aleksandr Petrov
- 2022-2023 Vladimir Lipayev

== See also ==
- Russia–Estonia relations
- Foreign relations of Estonia
- Foreign relations of Russia
- Embassy of Estonia, Moscow
- List of diplomatic missions of Russia
