= Ivan Aboimov =

Career Russian diplomat and ambassador

Ivan Pavlovich Aboimov (Russian: Иван Павлович Абоимов; 6 November 1936 – 24 August 2022) was a career Russian diplomat and ambassador.

== Life ==
Aboimov graduated from the Liepāja State Teacher Training College in 1959. From 1962–1963, Aboimov was the executive secretary of the Komsomol branch of the Latvian Soviet Socialist Republic and assistant manager of the Department of Propaganda of the Central Committee of the Komsomol in Latvia. Between 1963–1967 he was an instructor in the ideological department.

From 1967–1969 Aboimov was the divisional manager of foreign communications of the Central Committee of the Communist Party of Latvia. In 1972, he graduated from the Higher Diplomatic School of the USSR Ministry of Foreign Affairs, went on to work in various diplomatic posts in the central offices of the Ministry of Foreign Affairs and abroad.

His first ambassadorial appointment came in 1990, when he was appointed Ambassador of the Soviet Union to Hungary. After the dissolution of the USSR, he continued as Ambassador of Russia to Hungary until 15 November 1996. He was then appointed by Boris Yeltsin as Ambassador of Russia to Finland, a post he held until 6 August 1999 when he was appointed Ambassador of Russia to Ukraine. Aboimov retired from diplomatic life on 21 May 2001 when his ambassadorial post in Ukraine came to a conclusion, being replaced in Kyiv by Viktor Chernomyrdin.

Aboimov spoke Russian, English, German, Hungarian and Latvian.
