= Leonid Stark =

Soviet revolutionary, diplomat and victim of the Great Purge (1889–1937)

Leonid Nikolaevich Stark (Russian: Леонид Николаевич Старк; known by pseudonyms: Afghani, L. Manucharov, P. Ryabovsky; 1889 – November, 1937) was a Russian Bolshevik revolutionary, Soviet diplomat and editor.

== Biography ==
Leonid Stark was born in to the family of Nikolay Nikolaevich Stark, an officer in the Imperial Russian Army. Involved in the revolutionary movement from a young age, he joined the Russian Social Democratic Labour Party in 1905 while being a student at the Saint Petersburg State Institute of Technology.

Stark was arrested multiple times by the Tsarist authorities and was exiled. Initially settling in Vienna, he then traveled to Capri where he lived with Maxim Gorky who published his poetry.

In 1914 he returned to Russia and worked in the Petrograd Committee of the RSDLP (b). After the February Revolution, he edited the Bolshevik newspaper Volna in Helsingfors, which was distributed among the sailors of the Baltic Fleet and enjoyed great popularity among sailors. He showed journalistic and organizational skills, which then gave rise to the appointment of him as a commissioner of a news agency.

On the day of the October Revolution, a group of sailors commissioned by the Petrograd Military Revolutionary Committee, under the command of Stark stormed in to the building of the Petrograd Telegraph Agency and occupied it. He was later appointed deputy People's Commissar of Posts and Telegraphs of the RSFSR.

In March 1918 Stark and other leaders of the Petrograd Telegraph Agency moved to Moscow and the PTA was merged with the Press Bureau of the All-Russian Central Executive, creating the Russian Telegraph Agency (ROSTA) which Stark became the director of. In 1919 during the Civil War he was a military commissar in the Red Army.

From May 1920 he was authorized by the People's Commissariat of Foreign Affairs for diplomatic work. From 1921 to 1923 he was Counselor of the RSFSR/USSR Embassy in Estonia and in 1923–1924 he was Plenipotentiary Representative in Estonia. From 1924 to 1936 he served as the plenipotentiary of the USSR in Afghanistan. On August 31, 1926, he signed the Soviet-Afghan treaty on neutrality and mutual non-aggression.

In 1937, while working as an authorized person of the People's Commissariat for Foreign Affairs of the USSR under the Council of People's Commissars of the Transcaucasian SFSR, he was arrested in Tbilisi on charges of being involved in counter-revolutionary activities. Some Soviet sources claim that Stark died of pneumonia in 1942 while he was in prison captivity, however it is most likely he was shot in November 1937.

Leonid Stark was posthumously rehabilitated after the Khrushchev Thaw.
