= Iosif Shikin =

Soviet diplomat and party official (1906–1973)

Iosif Vasilievich Shikin (Russian: Ио́сиф Васи́льевич Ши́кин; 8 September [O.S. 26 August] 1906 – 30 July 1973) was a Soviet army political commissar and party official, who was Soviet ambassador in Tirana at the time of the Albanian–Soviet split.

== Biography ==
Iosif Shikin was born into a peasant family in the Ivanovo region of west Russia. He worked in an automobile factory in Nizhny Novgorod (Gorky) at a time Andrei Zhdanov was the regional party boss. In 1935, he was appointed secretary of the communist party committee for the district that included the automobile plant. In 1939, he was appointed a political commissar with the Red Army, and was transferred to Leningrad (St Petersburg) where, again, Zhdanov was head of the regional communist party. He was, evidently, a protege of Zhdanov – or as one historian described him – a "solid Zhdanovite". During the Siege of Leningrad, Shikin was the political officer, appointed by Zhdanov, to ensure that food and supplies were brought to the city across the ice when Lake Ladoga froze during the winter. In 1946, after the death of Aleksandr Shcherbakov, Shikin was appointed Head of the Political Directorate of the Red Army.

In 1949, Shikin was a victim of the Leningrad affair, a purge of officials who had been linked to Zhdanov, who was now dead – but unlike most of the high-profile victims, who were shot – he was not arrested, but was demoted to the post of head of the Lenin Military Political Academy. In 1950, he was transferred to the staff of the Central Committee.

Shikin was appointed soviet ambassador to Albania in November 1960, but was recalled on 25 November, during the Albania–Soviet split, when the USSR Foreign Ministry accused the Albanian authorities of having "intentionally created such conditions" that made it impossible for Shikin to carry out his responsibilities. The Albanians denied this and claimed that though he held the title of ambassador for 11 months, Shikin had actually spent only five months in Albania.

In 1962, he was appointed First Deputy Chairman of the Party and State Control Committee.
