= Yakov Davydov =

Soviet intelligence officer and diplomat

Yakov Davydov Яков Давыдов
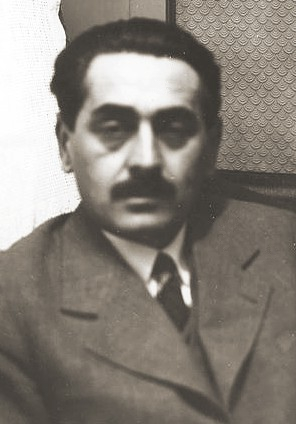
- Yakov Davtyan in Warsaw 1935

Head of the Cheka's Foreign Department
- In office November 12, 1920 – January 20, 1921
- Preceded by: Office Established
- Succeeded by: Ruben Katanyan
- In office April 10, 1921 – August 5, 1921
- Preceded by: Ruben Katanyan
- Succeeded by: Solomon Mogilevsky

Personal details
- Born: October 10, 1888 Erivan Governorate, Russian Empire
- Died: July 28, 1938 (aged 49) Moscow, Russian SFSR, Soviet Union
- Party: RSDLP (Bolsheviks) (1907–1918); Russian Communist Party (1918–1937)
- Spouse: Maria Maksakova Sr.

Yakov Khristoforovich Davtyan (Davydov) (Armenian: Յակով Դավթյան (Դավիդով), Russian: Яков Христофорович Давтян (Давыдов); 10 October 1888 – 28 July 1938) was the first head of the Cheka's Foreign Department from 1921 to 1922, the first head of Soviet foreign intelligence and later a Soviet diplomat.

== Biography ==
He was born in the Nakhichevan region between Russia and Iran to an Armenian family.

Since 1907 he lived in St. Petersburg, where he enrolled at St. Petersburg University. He worked in the St. Petersburg organization of the RSDLP (b) - was a member of the bureau of the district committee of the Petersburg side, a representative of the district committee at a citywide permanent conference. In September 1907 he was elected a member of the Petersburg Committee of the RSDLP. He worked in the Military Organization, in the editorial office of the newspaper “The Voice of the Barracks”, campaigned among the soldiers. At the end of 1907 he was arrested for revolutionary activity.

In May 1908 he emigrated to Belgium, where, continuing his studies, received an engineering degree. He participated in the work of Russian emigrant organizations, was a member of the socialist Belgian Labour Party, and collaborated in its print media.

During the First World War in 1915 he was arrested by the occupation authorities and imprisoned in the city of Aachen, where he spent 8 months. He was then transferred to an internment camp in Germany, and later was transferred to a penal camp for repeated escape attempts. In August 1918, after the conclusion of the Brest Peace, thanks to Adolph Joffe, he was released by the Germans and returned to Russia.

From September 1918 to February 1919, he was Deputy Chairman of the Moscow Provincial Archive Inessa Armand. In parallel, he led party work and collaborated with Pravda, publishing articles.

Since 1920, he worked in the NKVD. From November 1920 to August 1921 he was the first head of the Foreign Department (INO) of the Cheka, after which he joined the People's Commissariat of Foreign Affairs (NKID) of the RSFSR-USSR.

=== At the diplomatic service ===
After working in the Cheka, Davydov transferred to the diplomatic service, but continued to operate as an agent. He was a member of diplomatic corps first in Soviet republics of Lithuania (1922) and Tuva (1924), later an ambassador to Hungary (1924), aide of an ambassador to France (1925–1927), and ambassador to Persia (1927–1930), to Greece (1932–1934) and finally Poland (1934–1937). In 1937, during the period of Joseph Stalin's Great Purge, he was accused of belonging to the fictitious Leon Trotsky-Grigory Zinoviev faction (see Moscow Trials) and the following year was executed.

He was also the rector of the Peter the Great St. Petersburg Polytechnic University. The second husband of opera singer Maria Maksakova Sr.

=== Arrest and execution ===
In 1937, he was recalled from Warsaw to Moscow. Arrested on November 21, 1937. Accused of participating in a counter-revolutionary terrorist organization. Davtyan’s name was included in the Stalinist list, dated July 26, 1938 (No. 41 on the list of 139 people, under the heading “Moscow Center”). The list contains resolutions of Joseph Stalin and Vyacheslav Molotov. On July 28, 1938, the Military Collegium of the Supreme Court of the Soviet Union sentenced him to capital punishment, and he was shot on the same day.

On April 25, 1957, he was posthumously rehabilitated.

== See also ==
- Foreign Intelligence Service (Russia)
