= Yelena =

Yelena is a feminine given name. It is the Russian form of Helen, written Елена in Russian.

== Notable people called Yelena ==
- Yelena Afanasyeva, multiple people
- Yelena Akhaminova (born 1961), former volleyball player for the Soviet Union
- Yelena Andreevna (born 1972), play by the Russian playwright Anton Chekhov
- Yelena Andreyeva (born 1969), Russian sprinter
- Yelena Andreyuk (born 1958), former volleyball player for the USSR
- Yelena Andrienko (born 1972), Russian ballet dancer
- Yelena Anokhina (born 1947), Soviet diver
- Yelena Antonova, several people
- Yelena Arshintseva (born 1971), retired female race walker from Russia
- Yelena Avdeyeva (1968–2023), Russian politician
- Yelena Azarova (born 1973), Russian Synchro-swimmer
- Yelena Baranova (born 1972), Russian professional basketball player
- Yelena Baturina (born 1963), Russian oligarch, Russia's richest woman
- Yelena Bekman-Shcherbina (1882–1951), Russian pianist, composer and teacher
- Yelena Belevskaya (born 1963), retired athlete who represented the USSR until 1991 and Belarus since 1992
- Yelena Belyakova (born 1976), former pole vaulter from Russia
- Yelena Bet (born 1976), Belarusian sprint canoeist who competed in the early to mid-2000s
- Yelena Bibikova (born 1956), Russian politician
- Yelena Biserova (born 1962), Soviet-Russian track and field hurdler
- Yelena Bobrova (born 1974), Russian ice hockey player
- Yelena Bogomazova (born 1982), Russian swimmer
- Yelena Bolsun (born 1983), Russian female sprint athlete
- Yelena Bondarchuk (1962–2009), Soviet and Russian stage and film actress
- Yelena Bonner (1923–2011), human rights activist in the former Soviet Union, wife of dissident Andrei Sakharov
- Yelena Budnik (born 1976), Belarusian sprinter
- Yelena Burukhina (born 1977), former Russian cross country skier who has competed since 1996
- Yelena Byalkovskaya (born 1977), Russian ice hockey player
- Yelena Chebukina (born 1965), Soviet, Russian and Croatian volleyball player
- Yelena Chernetsova (born 1971), Kazakhstani cross-country skier
- Yelena Chernykh (1979–2011), Russian theatre actress
- Yelena Churakova (born 1986), Russian track and field athlete who specialises in the 400 metres hurdles
- Yelena Davydova (born 1961), Soviet gymnast
- Yelena Dembo (born 1983), Greek International Master of chess
- Yelena Dendeberova (born 1969), medley swimmer from the Soviet Union, Olympic silver medallist
- Yelena Dergachyova (born 1995), Russian ice hockey player
- Yelena Dmitriyeva (born 1983), Russian team handball player, playing on the Russian women's national handball team
- Yelena Donskaya (1915–2016), Soviet sport shooter
- Yelena Drapeko (born 1948), Russian actress
- Yelena Dubok (born 1976), Kazakhstani biathlete
- Yelena Dudina (born 1966), Soviet sprint canoeist who competed in the mid-1980s
- Yelena Dudnik (born 1978), Russian sport shooter
- Yelena Dudochkin, American singer
- Yelena Eckemoff, Russian-American soprano
- Yelena Ezau (born 1983), Kazakhstani volleyball player
- Yelena Gagarina (born 1959), Russian art historian
- Yelena Glikina (born 1969), Soviet fencer
- Yelena Godina (born 1977), Russian volleyball player
- Yelena Golesheva (born 1966), Russian track and field sprinter
- Yelena Gorchakova (1933–2002), Soviet athlete who competed mainly in the javelin throw event
- Yelena Granaturova (born 1953), Soviet tennis player
- Yelena Greshnyakova (born 1968), Russian politician
- Yelena Grigoryeva (1979–2019), Russian LGBT rights activist
- Yelena Grigoryeva (figure skater) (born 1974), Russian figure skater
- Yelena Grishina (born 1968), Soviet fencer
- Yelena Grudneva (born 1974), Russian gymnast
- Yelena Gruzinova (born 1967), retired female race walker from Russia
- Yelena Gulyayeva, née Rodina (born 1967), retired Russian high jumper
- Yelena Guryeva (born 1958), field hockey player and Olympic medalist
- Yelena Hahn (1814–1843), Russian writer
- Yelena Ilyina (born 1967), Soviet speed skater
- Yelena Ilyukhina (born 1982), Kazakhstani handball player
- Yelena Isinbayeva (born 1982), Russian pole vaulter
- Yelena Jemayeva (born 1971), Azerbaijani fencer
- Yelena Kalugina (born 1972), Belarusian cross-country skier
- Yelena Kashcheyeva (born 1973), Kazakhstani long jumper
- Yelena Katishonok, Russian-language writer
- Yelena Khanga (born 1961), author of Soul to Soul: The Story of a Black Russian American Family: 1865–1992
- Yelena Khloptseva (born 1960), Russian rower and Olympic champion
- Yelena Khudashova (born 1965), Russian basketball player
- Yelena Kiselyova (1878–1974), Russian painter
- Yelena Klimenko, Kazakhstani handball player
- Yelena Kolesova (1920–1942), Soviet partisan
- Yelena Komarova (born 1985), Azerbaijani wrestler
- Yelena Kondakova (born 1957), the third Soviet/Russian female cosmonaut to travel to space
- Yelena Kondulainen (born 1958), Soviet singer and actor
- Yelena Konevtseva (born 1981), female hammer thrower from Russia
- Yelena Konshina (born 1950), Russian composer and music educator
- Yelena Korban (born 1961), track and field sprinter from the Soviet Union
- Yelena Koreneva (born 1953), Russian actress
- Yelena Korobkina (born 1990), Russian middle-distance runner
- Yelena Korolyova (born 1973), Russian freestyle skier
- Yelena Kosolapova (born 1937), Soviet diver
- Yelena Kotelnikova (born 1969), Russian judoka
- Yelena Krivoshey (born 1977), Russian gymnast
- Yelena Kruglova (born 1962), Soviet swimmer
- Yelena Ksenofontova (born 1972), Russian stage and film actress, Honored Artist of Russia (2006)
- Yelena Kurzina (born 1960), Belarusian slalom canoeist who competed in the mid-1990s
- Yelena Alexandrovna Kuzmina (1909–1979), Soviet actress
- Yelena Kuznetsova (born 1977), race walker from Kazakhstan
- Yelena Lanskaya (born 1968), American film director, producer and editor
- Yelena Lapuga (born 1964), Soviet speed skater
- Yelena Lapushkina (born 1968), Russian politician
- Yelena Lebedenko (born 1971), Russian heptathlete and triple jumper
- Yelena Lebedeva (born 1977), Uzbekistani sprint canoeist who competed in the mid-1990s
- Yelena Leonova (born 1973), Soviet pair skater
- Yelena Leuchanka (born 1983), Belarusian professional women's basketball player
- Yelena Lyubimova (1925–1985), Soviet geologist known for her geothermal research
- Yelena Maciel (born 1988), Venezuelan actress
- Yelena Maglevannaya (born 1981), Russian free-lance journalist for the newspaper Svobodnoye Slovo, Free Speech, in Volgograd
- Yelena Makarova (born 1973), Russian swimmer
- Yelena Maksimova (1905–1986), Soviet actress
- Yelena Malysheva (born 1961), Russian physician and TV presenter
- Yelena Maryassova (born 1997), Kazakhstani rhythmic gymnast
- Yelena Masyuk (born 1966), Russian television journalist, covered the First and Second Chechen Wars and her 1997 abduction
- Yelena Matiyevskaya (born 1961), Russian former rower who competed in the 1980 Summer Olympics
- Yelena Matyushenko (born 1961), Soviet diver
- Yelena Medvedeva (born 1965), Soviet rowing coxswain
- Yelena Melnikova (born 1971), Russian biathlete
- Yelena Migunova (born 1984), Russian sprint athlete
- Yelena Mikulich (born 1977), Belarus rower
- Yelena Miroshina (1974–1995), diver from Russia
- Yelena Mizulina (born 1954), Russian politician
- Yelena Motalova (born 1971), long-distance runner from Russia
- Yelena Mukhina (1960–2006), Soviet gymnast
- Yelena Nagovitsyna (born 1982), Russian long-distance runner
- Yelena Naimushina (1964–2017), Soviet gymnast
- Yelena Nanaziashvili (born 1981), Kazakhstani long-distance runner
- Yelena Nazemnova (born 1980), Russian swimmer
- Yelena Nechayeva (born 1979), Russian fencer
- Yelena Nikolayeva (born 1966), Russian race walker
- Yelena Nikolayeva (journalist) (born 1985)
- Yelena Oblova (born 1988), Russian sailor
- Yelena Oleynikova (born 1976), Russian triple jumper
- Yelena Sidorchenkova Orlova (born 1980), Russian long-distance runner
- Yelena Ovchinnikova (born 1982), Russian competitor in synchronized swimming
- Yelena Paducheva (1935–2019), Russian linguist
- Yelena Panova, several people
- Yelena Parfenova (born 1974), Kazakhstani triple jumper
- Yelena Parkhomenko (born 1982), Azerbaijani volleyball player
- Yelena Partova (born 1985), Kazakhstani handball player
- Yelena Pavlova (born 1978), female volleyball player from Kazakhstan
- Yelena Perminova (born 1960), Russian politician
- Yelena Pershina (born 1963), retired female long jumper from Kazakhstan
- Yelena Petrova (born 1966), Russian former judoka who competed in the 1992 Summer Olympics
- Yelena Petushkova (1940–2007), Russian and former Soviet equestrian who won three Olympic medals
- Yelena Piraynen (born 1969), Belarusian cross-country skier
- Yelena Piskunova (born 1980), Uzbekistani sprinter
- Yelena Plotnikova (born 1978), volleyball player from Russia
- Yelena Plotnikova (archer) (born 1977), Kazakhstani archer
- Yelena Podkaminskaya (born 1979), Russian actress
- Yelena Polenova (1850–1898), Russian painter and designer, sister of Vasily Polenov
- Yelena Polenova (handballer) (born 1983), Russian handball player
- Yelena Portova (born 1985), Kazakhstani handball player
- Yelena Posevina (born 1986), Russian gymnast and Olympic champion
- Yelena Potapenko (born 1993), Kazakhstani modern pentathlete
- Yelena Priyma (born 1983), hammer thrower from Russia
- Yelena Produnova, also known as Elena (born 1980), Russian gymnast
- Yelena Prokhorova (born 1978), Russian heptathlete who won a silver medal at the 2000 Summer Olympics
- Yelena Prokopcuka (born 1976), Latvian long-distance runner, won the New York City Marathon in 2005 and 2006
- Yelena Protsenko (born 1968), Ukrainian-born Russian politician
- Yelena Provorova (born 2001), Russian ice hockey player
- Yelena Rabaya (born 1960), Russian sport shooter
- Yelena Rigert (born 1983), Russian hammer thrower
- Yelena Rojkova (born 1989), Turkmen swimmer
- Yelena Romanova (1963–2007), Russian middle distance runner
- Yelena Rudkovskaya (born 1973), Belarusian swimmer and Olympic champion
- Yelena Ruzina (born 1964), retired athlete who competed mainly in the 400 metres
- Yelena Ryabova (born 1990), Turkmenistan short-distance runner
- Yelena Safonova (born 1956), Russian actress
- Yelena Samarina (1927–2011), Spanish actor
- Yelena Sayko (born 1967), retired female race walker from Russia
- Yelena Serova (born 1976), Russian cosmonaut and politician
- Yelena Shalamova (born 1982), Russian rhythmic gymnast
- Yelena Shalina (born 1969), Russian cross-country skier
- Yelena Shalygina (born 1986), Kazakh wrestler
- Yelena Shatkovskaya (born 1957), Soviet and Russian scientist
- Yelena Shchapova (born 1950), Italian-Russian model, writer and poet
- Yelena Sheremeteva, 16th-century Russian noblewoman
- Yelena Shevchenko, multiple people
- Yelena Shidyanskaya, Greek-Russian military commander
- Yelena Shtelmaister (born 1977), Kazakhstani ice hockey player
- Yelena Shubina (born 1974), Russian former swimmer who competed in the 1992 Summer Olympics
- Yelena Shulman (1969–2023), Russian voice actress
- Yelena Shushunova (1969–2018), Russian (former Soviet) gymnast, World, European, and Olympic Champion
- Yelena Shvaybovich (born 1966), Belarusian basketball player
- Yelena Sidorchenkova (born 1980), Russian long-distance runner who specializes in the 3000 metres steeplechase
- Yelena Silina (born 1987), Russian ice hockey player
- Yelena Sinchukova (born 1961), Russian long and triple jumper
- Yelena Sinitsina (born 1971), Kazakhstani speed skater
- Yelena Sinkevich (born 1971), Belarusian cross-country skier
- Yelena Sipatova (born 1955), retired long-distance runner from the Soviet Union
- Yelena Skalinskaya (born 1987), Kazakhstani swimmer
- Yelena Skrynnik (born 1961), First female Minister of Agriculture of the Russian Federation between March 2009 and May 2012
- Yelena Skulskaya (born 1950), Estonian journalist and writer
- Yelena Slesarenko, née Sivushenko (born 1982), Russian high jumper
- Yelena Smurova (born 1974), Russian water polo player, who won the bronze medal at the 2000 Summer Olympics
- Yelena Soboleva (born 1982), Russian middle distance runner who specializes in the 1500 metres
- Yelena Solovey (born 1947), Soviet film actress
- Yelena Soya (born 1981), Russian Synchro-swimmer
- Yelena Stempkovskaya (1921–1942), Soviet radio operator
- Yelena Stepanenko (born 1953), Russian stand-up comic and actor
- Yelena Struchayeva (born 1965), Kazakhstani sport shooter
- Yelena Suyazova (born 1989), team handball player from Kazakhstan
- Yelena Svezhentseva (born 1968), javelin thrower from Uzbekistan
- Yelena Syuzeva (born 1987), Russian sailor
- Yelena Taranova (born 1961), Azerbaijani paralympic sport shooter, silver medalist of 2000 Summer Paralympics
- Yelena Tereshina (born 1959), Soviet rower
- Yelena Terleyeva (born 1985), USSR) Russian singer, best known for her hit "Solntse"
- Yelena Tikhanina (born 1977), Russian speed skater
- Yelena Timoshenko (born 1955), Russian swimmer
- Yelena Tissina (born 1977), Russian sprint canoeist who competed in the late 1990s and early 2000s
- Yelena Tregubova (born 1973), Russian journalist, a critic of the president Vladimir Putin and his environment
- Yelena Trofimenko (born 1964), Belarusian film director, producer, screenwriter, author, actress, poet
- Yelena Tsukhlo (born 1954), Belarusian marathon runner
- Yelena Tumanova (born 1965), Soviet speed skater
- Yelena Turysheva (born 1986), Russian cross-country skier
- Yelena Tyurina (born 1971), retired female volleyball player from Russia
- Yelena Tyushnyakova (born 1963), Russian speed skater
- Yelena Ubiyvovk (1918–1942), Soviet partisan
- Yelena Usievich (1893–1968), Russian writer and literary critic
- Yelena Välbe, née Trubitsyna (born 1968), Russian former cross-country skier
- Yelena Vasilevskaya (born 1978), Russian volleyball player
- Yelena Velikanova (born 1984), Russian actress
- Yelena Vinogradova (born 1964), female track and field athlete who represented the Soviet Union
- Yelena Volchetskaya (born 1943), Soviet and Belarusian artistic gymnast
- Yelena Volkova, several people
- Yelena Vorona (born 1976), Russian freestyle skier
- Yelena Yefimova (born 1948), Russian artist and sculptor and a member of the National Association of Art crafts and Guild masters
- Yelena Yelesina (born 1970), female high jumper from Russia
- Yelena Yemchuk (born 1970), professional photographer, painter and film director, known for her work with The Smashing Pumpkins
- Yelena Yevtyukhova (born 1970), Russian politician
- Yelena Yudina (born 1988), Russia skeleton racer who has been competing since 2005
- Yelena Zadorozhnaya (born 1977), Russian runner who specializes in the 3000, 5000 metres and 3000 metres steeplechase
- Yelena Zakharova (born 1975), Russian actress
- Yelena Zgardan (born 1989), Russian handball player
- Yelena Zhukova (1906–1991), Russian artist
- Yelena Zhupiyeva-Vyazova (born 1960), retired female track and field athlete from Ukraine
- Yelena Zlenko (born 1967), Russian politician

== Fictional characters ==
- Yelena (Attack on Titan), a character in the manga series Attack on Titan
- Yelena Belova, a character in the Marvel Comics universe using the codename Black Widow

== See also ==
- Jelena, a given name
