= Dmitry Yakushkin =

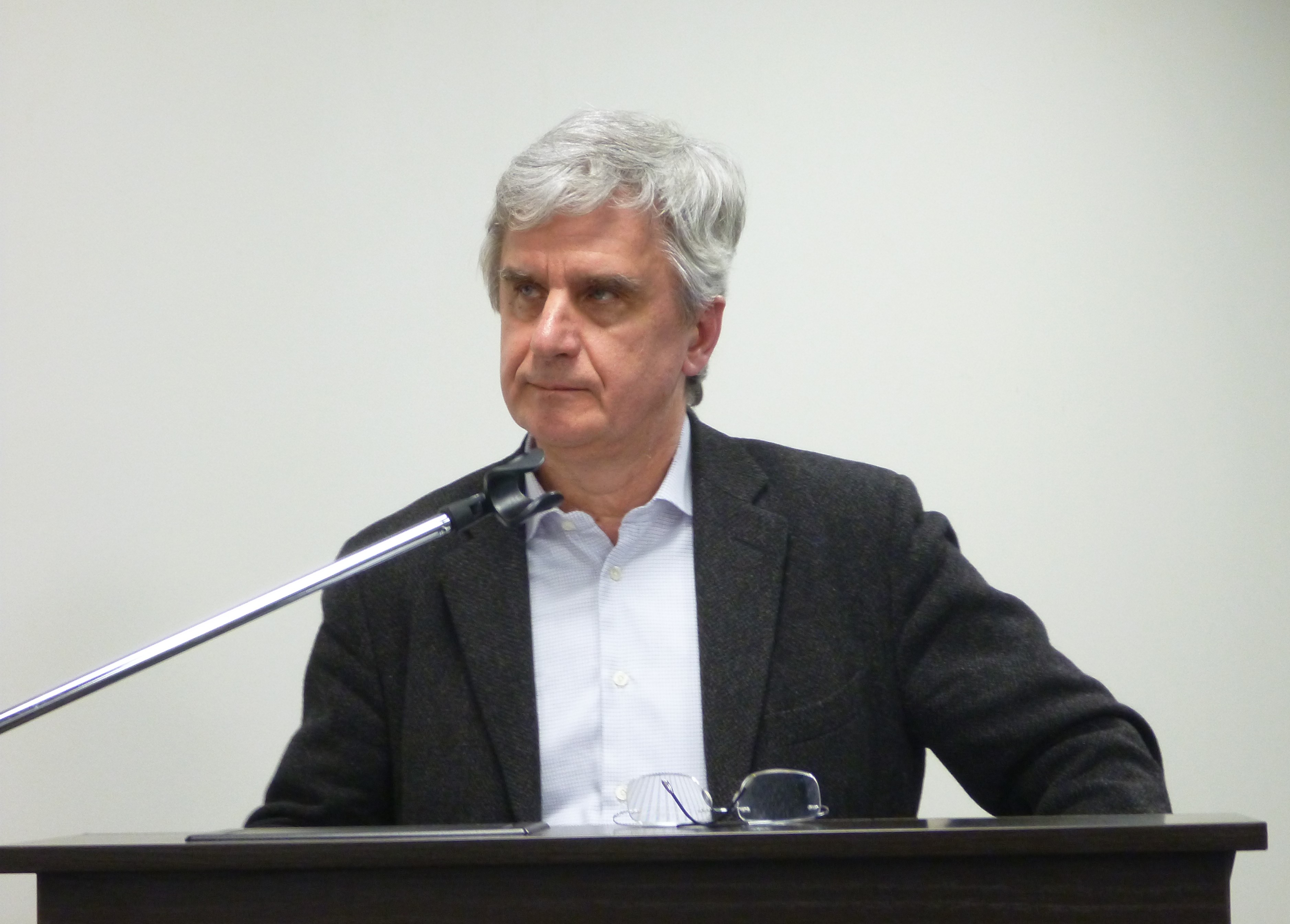
- Yakushkin at the Boris Yeltsin Presidential Center on 21 January 2020.

Kremlin Press Secretary
- In office 15 September 1998 – 3 January 2000
- President: Boris Yeltsin
- Preceded by: Sergey Yastrzhembsky
- Succeeded by: Alexey Gromov

Personal details
- Born: February 4, 1957 (age 69) Moscow, Soviet Union

Dmitry Dmitrievich Yakushkin (Russian: Дмитрий Дмитриевич Якушкин; born February 4, 1957) is a Soviet and Russian journalist, who was the fifth and last Kremlin Press Secretary to Boris Yeltsin from 15 September 1998 — 3 January 2000.

== Biography ==
He was born on February 4, 1957, in Moscow, in the family of the assistant to the Minister of Agriculture of the RSFSR Dmitry Ivanovich Yakushkin (1923–1994), who later held leadership positions in the First Chief Directorate of the KGB.

In his youth, he lived in the United States and attended an American school. In 1979, he graduated from the Faculty of International Journalism at the Moscow State Institute of International Relations (MGIMO) of the Soviet Foreign Ministry. From 1979 to 1986 he worked in the international department of Komsomolskaya Pravda.

From 1986 to 1990, he was the head of the regional bureau of the Novosti Press Agency in France and a staff correspondent for the newspaper Moskovskiye Novosti in France. From 1990 to 1995, he was a columnist and member of the editorial board of Moskovskiye Novosti.

From 1995 to 1997 he was the author and host of the program “Double Portrait” at VGTRK.

In 1997, he became the first editor-in-chief of the Russian" version of Geo magazine. From 1997 to 1998, he was the host of the daily political program “Details” at VGTRK. On September 15, 1998, by decree of President Boris Yeltsin, he was appointed Deputy Head of the Presidential Administration of Russia and Kremlin Press Secretary. He continued to serve as Press Secretary under Boris Yeltsin after his resignation from the post of President of the Russian Federation, until January 3, 2000.

== Post-government ==
From January 2000 to April 2001, he was an Assistant to Kremlin Chief of Staff Aleksandr Voloshin. He has been a member of the Board of MDM-Bank since April 2001. Since 2002, he has been executive director of the Russian-American Business Council. Since 2006, Yakushkin has served as GR Director for Highland Gold Mining. His responsibilities included overseeing the company's external communications. He is a professor at the Higher School of Economics. He has been a PIR Center (Center for Policy Studies in Russia) Advisory Board Member since 2014.

== Family and personal life ==
His wife Marina Yakushkina (born 1956) was daughter of journalist Genrikh Borovik. His son Ivan (born 1976) is an entrepreneur and a graduate of the history department of Moscow State University. He speaks English and French.
