= Dmitry Peskov =

Russian politician and diplomat (born 1967)

- Дмитрий Песков
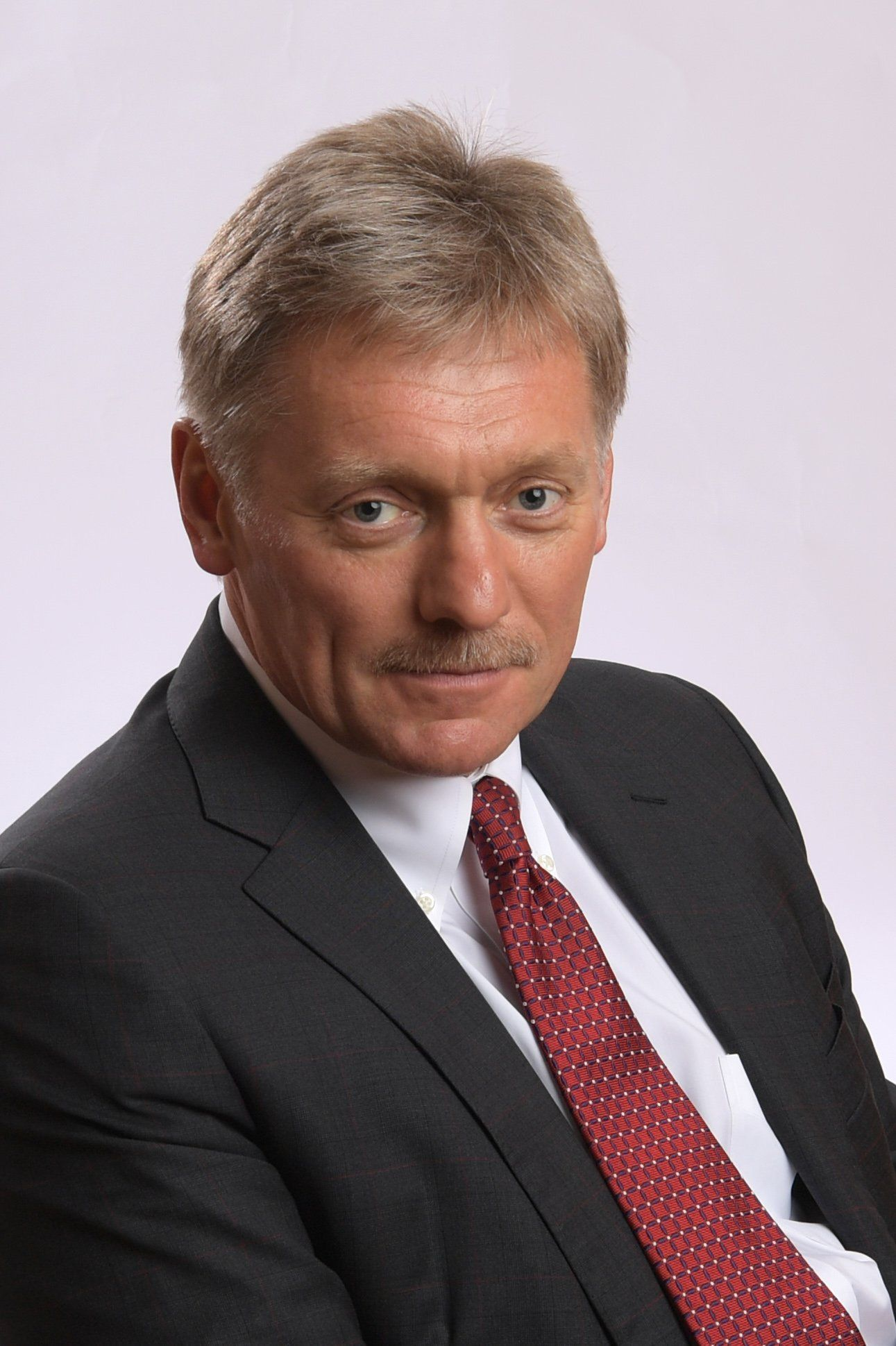
- Official portrait, 2018

Kremlin Press Secretary
- Incumbent
- Assumed office 22 May 2012
- President: Vladimir Putin
- Preceded by: Natalya Timakova

Kremlin Deputy Chief of Staff
- Incumbent
- Assumed office 22 May 2012
- President: Vladimir Putin
- Chief of Staff: Sergei Ivanov; Anton Vaino

Press Secretary of the Prime Minister of Russia
- In office 25 April 2008 – 21 May 2012
- Prime Minister: Viktor Zubkov (until 7 May); Vladimir Putin (from 8 May)
- Preceded by: Alexey Gromov
- Succeeded by: Natalya Timakova

Personal details
- Born: 17 October 1967 (age 59) Moscow, Soviet Union
- Spouses: Anastasia Budennaya (m. 1988; div. 1994) Yekaterina Solotsinskaya (m. 1994; div. 2015) Tatiana Navka (m. 2015)
- Children: 5, including Nikolay
- Education: Moscow State University

Dmitry Sergeyevich Peskov (Russian: Дмитрий Сергеевич Песков, IPA: [pʲɪˈskof]; born 17 October 1967) is a Russian diplomat serving as the spokesman for Russian president Vladimir Putin since 2012.

== Early life and education ==
Peskov was born in Moscow on 17 October 1967.

His father, Sergey, was the Russian ambassador to Pakistan from 2004 until 2008, and the ambassador to Oman from 2011 until 2013. In 1989, Peskov graduated from the Institute of Asian and African Countries at the Moscow State University, specializing in History and Eastern studies. In the same year, Peskov joined the Soviet Foreign Ministry.

== Diplomatic career ==
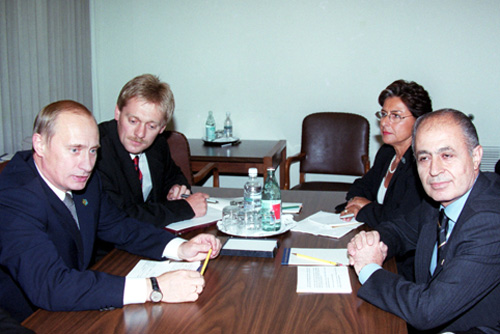
Peskov with Russian President Vladimir Putin and Turkish President Ahmet Necdet Sezer, 7 September 2000

In 1990, Peskov was appointed to the Soviet embassy in Ankara, Turkey, as an administrative assistant. Subsequently, he filled the positions of attaché and then third secretary at the embassy. In 1994, he was assigned to work in the Russian Foreign Ministry in Moscow. After two years there, he was posted back to Ankara in 1996 with the diplomatic rank of second, and then first secretary at the Russian embassy.

In 2000, Peskov returned to Russia to work at the press service of the Russian president, serving in a number of positions, including a four-year term as the first deputy press secretary of the Russian president, from 2004 to 2008. Peskov has served as Putin's spokesperson since April 2000. Peskov was named as prime minister Viktor Zubkov's press secretary on 25 April 2008, putting him in place to lead Vladimir Putin's press operations when he moved to the job of Prime Minister under Dmitry Medvedev's presidency. In May 2012, when Putin again became president, Peskov succeeded Natalya Timakova as the presidential spokesperson. During the 2011–2013 Russian protests in which riot police clubbed protestors, Peskov said that "protesters who hurt riot police should have their livers smeared on the asphalt", causing an outcry among opposition activists.

In January 2016, Donald Trump's personal lawyer, Michael Cohen, sent an e-mail to Dmitry Peskov asking for help with a business deal in Moscow. The Washington Post called this the "most direct outreach documented by a top Trump aide to a similarly senior member of Putin's government." After initial difficulties in addressing the email Peskov's office replied by email and telephone. Cohen denied this response when testifying to Congress but later said that he had lied, and the Moscow Project had continued until at least June 2016.

Peskov has the federal state civilian service rank of 1st class Active State Councillor of the Russian Federation.

=== Russian invasion of Ukraine ===
In November 2021, Peskov denied allegations that Russia was preparing for a possible invasion of Ukraine. In January 2022, Peskov accused the United States of "fomenting tensions" around Ukraine. On 1 March 2022, during a conference call with reporters, Peskov did not want to comment on Russian military casualties. He insisted "the Russian troops don't conduct any strikes against civilian infrastructure and residential areas".

Peskov denounced Russians who oppose the war as "traitors". On 27 March 2022, in a conversation with Ryan Chilcote on PBS NewsHour, Peskov claimed the Russian military invading Ukraine was not targeting civilians or civilian infrastructure, only military infrastructure, suggesting that Ukrainian cities such as Mariupol were destroyed by the Ukrainians themselves, and that murdered civilians of that city were killed by fellow "Nazi" Ukrainians; Chilcote observed "in all fairness, you know everyone outside of Russia has been watching hundreds and hundreds of hours of footage that has come out of the country showing widespread targeting of civilian infrastructure, apartment buildings, theaters, hospitals". In the same interview, Peskov said on the usage of nuclear weapons: "... any outcome of the operation, of course, is not a reason for usage of a nuclear weapon. We have a security concept that very clearly states that only when there is a threat for existence of the state in our country, we can use and we will actually use nuclear weapons ... Existence of the state, and special military operation in Ukraine, they have nothing to do with each other. ... There was a part of [Putin's] statement warning different states not to interfere ... and I think that everyone understands what he meant. ... No one is thinking about using, even about the idea of using nuclear weapons."

In early April 2022, he said that war against Ukraine was necessary because Ukraine had been an "anti-Russian center" since 2014. Peskov denied that Russian soldiers were responsible for the Bucha massacre, saying the whole situation in Bucha was a "well-staged insinuation". On 2 August 2022, Peskov said Nancy Pelosi's visit to Taiwan was leading to an "increase in tension" in the region and accused the United States of choosing "the path of confrontation", adding "We want to emphasise once again that we are absolutely in solidarity with China, its attitude towards the problem is understandable and absolutely justified."

On 13 September 2022, Peskov said there were no plans to announce a full or partial mobilization in Russia. On 21 September 2022, Putin announced a partial military mobilization. Peskov declined to deny reports that some anti-war protesters had been given draft papers. He noted that the delivery of subpoenas to detainees does not contradict the law. Nikolay Peskov, the son of Dmitry Peskov, told pranksters, who pretended to be recruitment officers, that he had no intention of going to war because he is "Mr. Peskov", and would solve the issue "on a different level".

On 30 September 2022, Russia claimed to have annexed four regions of Ukraine after contested referendums supposedly indicating that a vast majority of the population there wanted the regions to become Russian territory. On 3 October 2022, Peskov said that the borders of two of the regions, namely Kherson and Zaporizhzhia, had not been determined yet, but Russia would "consult with the people who live in those regions".

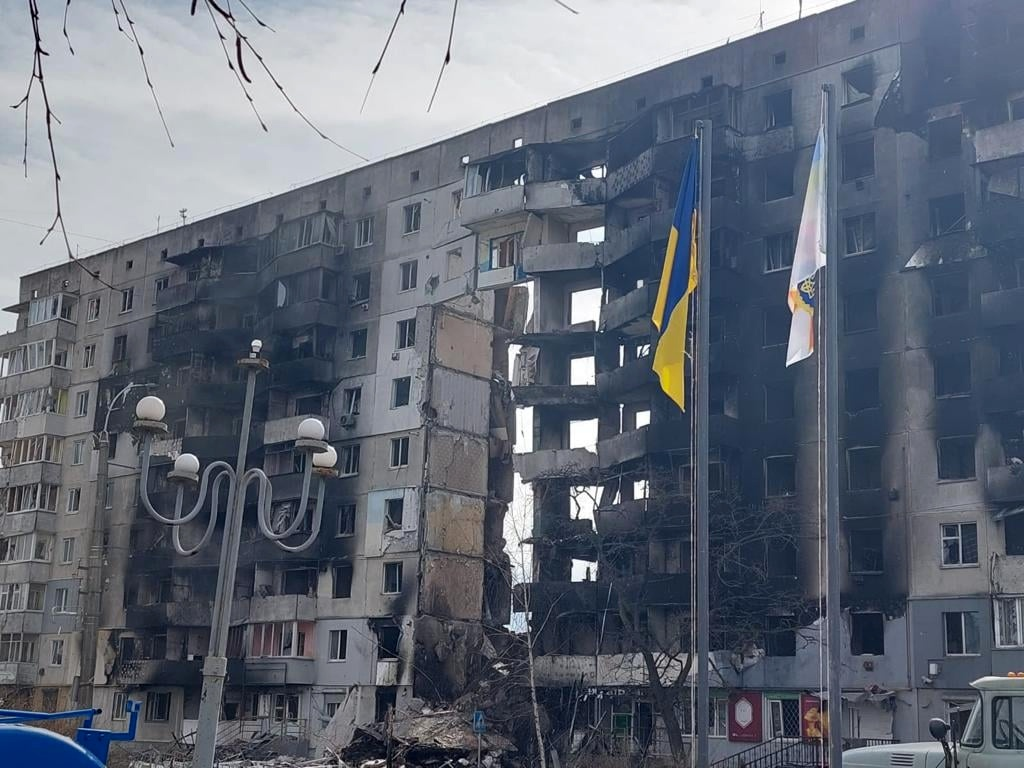
Residential building in Borodianka (Kyiv Oblast) after the Russian bombing of Borodianka in March 2022. Peskov claimed that "Russian troops don't conduct any strikes against civilian infrastructure and residential areas".

On 26 October 2022, Peskov said, without providing evidence, that Ukraine was planning a terrorist sabotage act using a "dirty bomb"—or an explosive that contains radioactive waste material. In November 2022, he denied that the Russian military was attacking civilian infrastructure in Ukraine. According to Peskov, the Russian army only attacks targets that are directly or indirectly connected to military potential.

In early December 2022, Peskov denied that the Russian government was planning a new wave of mobilization. In late December 2022, he said that any peace plan to end the Russo-Ukrainian War could only proceed from Ukraine's recognition of Russia's sovereignty over the regions it illegally annexed from Ukraine in September 2022. Peskov said that due to the resistance of the Ukrainian army and Western military support to Ukraine, "the suffering of the Ukrainian people will continue longer than it could have".

In January 2023, Peskov said that "there is currently no prospect for diplomatic means of settling the situation around Ukraine". In March 2023, after the Chinese peace proposal was submitted, he said "we paid a lot of attention to our Chinese friends' plan", but new "territorial realities could not be ignored" as these realities became "an internal factor" (for Russia). Peskov then rejected the Chinese peace proposal, saying that "for now, we don't see any of the conditions that are needed to bring this whole story towards peace". That same month, the Russian Ministry of Defence confirmed their responsibility for the Dnipro residential building airstrike, which killed over 40 civilians. However, Peskov stated that Russian forces never attack residential buildings and that the residential building had probably collapsed because of a Ukrainian air defense counterattack.

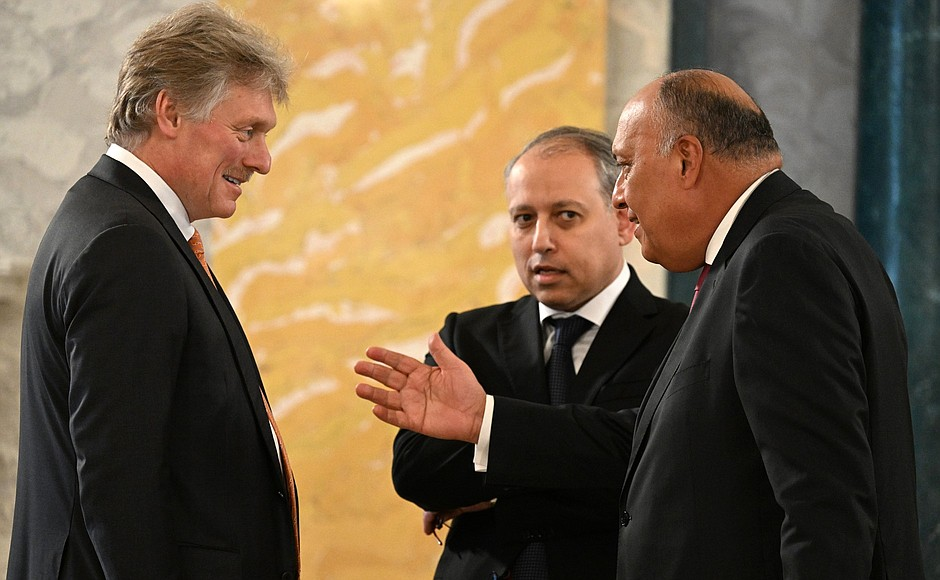
Peskov with Egyptian Foreign Minister Sameh Shoukry on 17 June 2023

In March 2023, single father Alexei Moskalyov was sentenced to two years in prison under Russia's 2022 war censorship laws for anti-war comments on social media. His daughter was moved to a state-run "rehabilitation centre" for minors. Peskov defended Moskalyov's conviction and called the father's parenting "deplorable". On 14 March 2023, Peskov said about possible peace talks between Russia and Ukraine: "We have to achieve our goals. Right now this is only possible by military means due to the current position of the Kyiv regime." He called the ICC arrest warrant for Vladimir Putin "outrageous and unacceptable", and said that Russia does not recognize the jurisdiction of the International Criminal Court. On 4 May 2023, Peskov claimed, without evidence, that the United States was behind the alleged drone attack on the Kremlin, saying that "We know very well that decisions about such actions, about such terrorist attacks, are made not in Kyiv but in Washington."

Speaking to Bosnian ATV TV channel, Peskov claimed that Russia was unable to defeat Ukraine because of Russia's humanitarian concern for the preservation of Ukrainian cities and human lives. He told ATV that the Russian military was "so slow" in winning because "We are not waging a war. ... We seek to preserve the infrastructure; we seek to preserve human lives." He claimed that the goals of the "special military operation" were "partially achieved", but the tasks "related to the protection of Donbas residents" were far from being completed. In June 2023, a delegation from Africa visited Ukraine and Russia to call for peace, but Putin rejected the delegation's peace plan based on accepting Ukraine's internationally recognized borders. Peskov said that it was difficult to implement the African peace plan.

In an interview with The New York Times on 6 August 2023, Peskov said that Russia did not seek to annex more territory in Ukraine and that "we just want to control all the land we have now written into our constitution as ours." He also told The New York Times that "our presidential election is not really democracy, it is costly bureaucracy. Mr. Putin will be re-elected next year with more than 90 percent of the vote." In an interview with the RBK news agency, Peskov said that Russia "theoretically" does not need to hold presidential elections because "it’s obvious that Putin will be reelected."

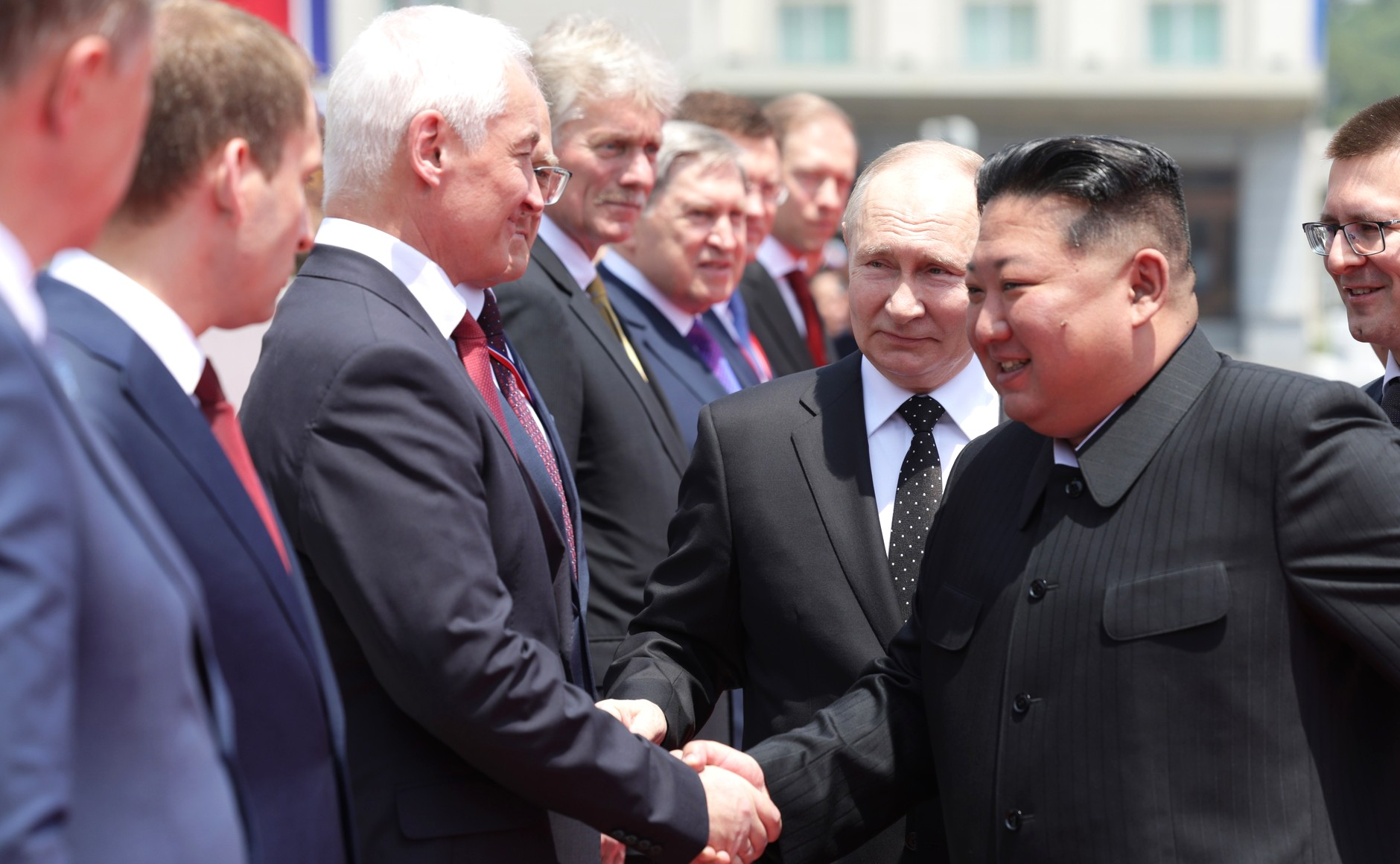
Peskov with Putin and North Korean leader Kim Jong Un in Pyongyang, North Korea, 19 June 2024

On 2 November 2023, Peskov said that the war in Ukraine was "not in a stalemate" and Russian troops would continue to fight, saying that "all the goals that were set should be fulfilled." On 22 November 2023, Peskov welcomed the ceasefire in the Gaza war, saying that "Russia and most countries in the world have been calling for a ceasefire and for a humanitarian pause."

On 22 March 2024, Peskov admitted that "De jure it is a special military operation. But de facto it has turned into a war." According to OVD-Info, at least 900 individuals have been convicted since the conflict was started by Russia for opposing the conflict.

On 22 April 2024 after the Ukraine Security Supplemental Appropriations Act, 2024 had passed the US House of Representatives by a margin of 311 to 112, Peskov remarked the legislation authorizing the confiscation of frozen Russian reserves as "nothing less than the demolition of all the foundations of the economic system" and "an attack on state property, state assets and private property."

In July 2024, Putin warned of a Cold War-style missile crisis and threatened to deploy long-range missiles within striking distance of the West after the United States announced its intention to deploy long-range missiles in Germany from 2026. Peskov said: "We are taking steady steps towards the Cold War."

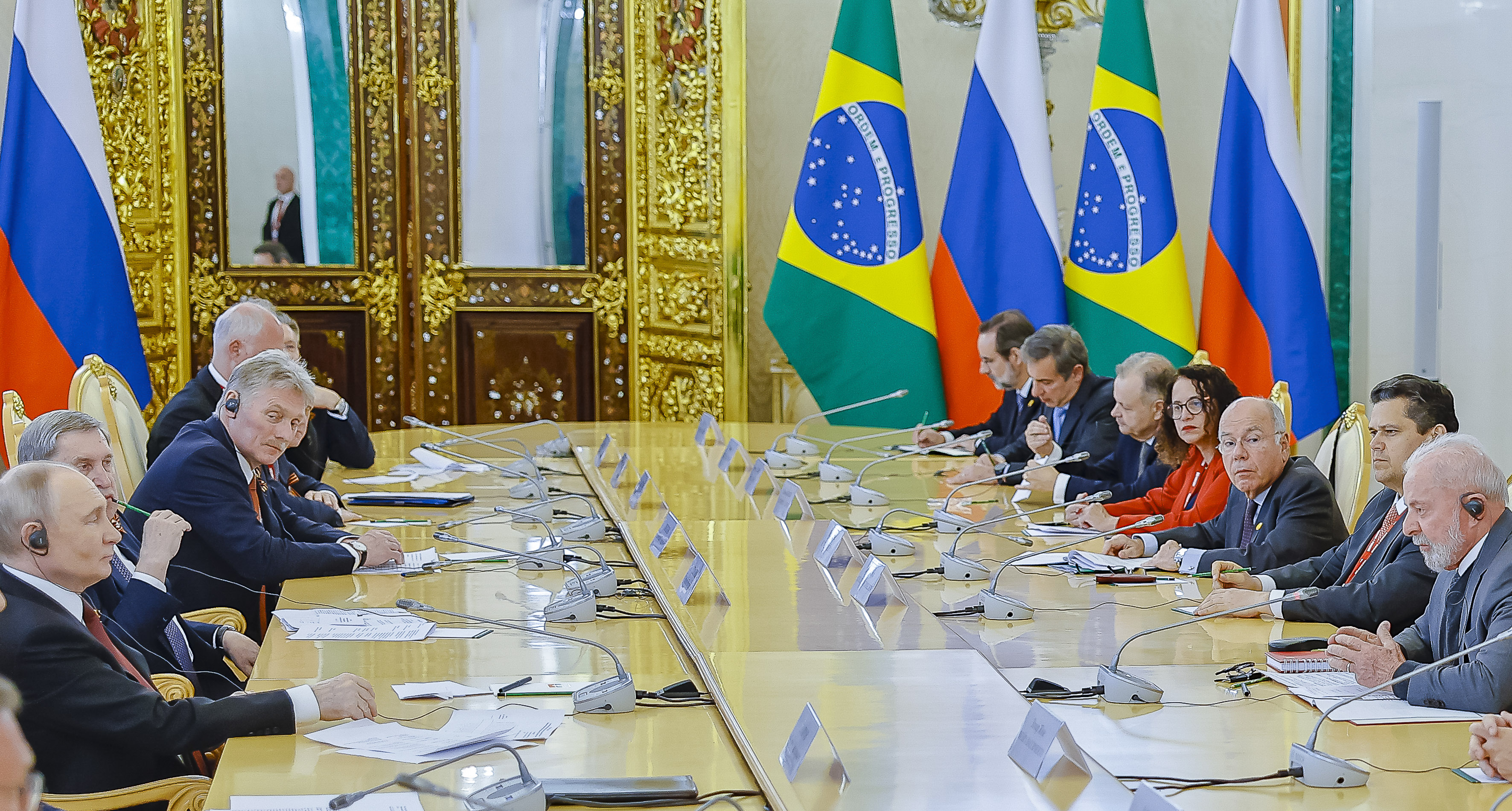
Putin, Peskov and Brazilian President Lula da Silva during Victory Day celebrations in Moscow on 9 May 2025

In August 2024, while Russia faced the Ukrainian invasion of the Kursk Oblast, Peskov went on summer vacation and could not be reached to answer questions about developments in Kursk.

In December 2024, Peskov rejected Donald Trump's claim that Russia suffered more than 600,000 casualties in the war with Ukraine, saying that "Ukraine’s losses are multiple times higher than those of Russia."

In July 2025, Peskov downplayed Trump's criticism of Putin for rejecting a ceasefire in Ukraine.

In September 2025, Peskov rejected Trump's claim that Russia is a paper tiger. Peskov claimed that the slow advance of Russian troops in Ukraine was deliberate in order to minimize Russian casualties.

On 25 July 2026, following Kazakh President Kassym-Jomart Tokayev's call in Omsk for the Russo-Ukrainian war to be “frozen” and for negotiations to return to the “Istanbul Formula 2.0”, Peskov said that freezing the conflict was impossible given Kyiv's position. He added that Russia's military operations could end if Kyiv made the “appropriate decisions” and reiterated that Russia's overriding condition was to achieve its stated objectives.

== Personal life ==
In 1988, Peskov married Anastasia Budyonnaya, the granddaughter of Soviet military commander Semyon Budyonny. Their son, Nikolay Peskov (born 1990), is a former conscript in Russia's Strategic Rocket Forces, and reportedly served in the Wagner Group, although his Tesla Model X was repeatedly caught violating speed limits in Moscow at the same time he was allegedly serving on the war front in Ukraine. Peskov's second wife was Ekaterina Solotsynskaya. Their daughter, Elizaveta "Liza" Peskova (born 1998), is an assistant to far-right Aymeric Chauprade, a French Member of the European Parliament. After the Russian invasion of Ukraine in February 2022, Elizaveta posted the words "no to war" to her Instagram page, and deleted it shortly afterwards. Peskova owns a company in Russia called "Centrum Moscow", whose revenue increased 70 times for the 2022 fiscal year, with Elizaveta earning a record 137 million rubles. This is 70 times the level of revenue for the previous year. Peskov and Solotsynskaya also have two sons, Mika and Deni. Deni resides in Paris.

In August 2014, Peskov had a daughter, Nadya, with Olympic Champion ice dancer Tatiana Navka. In July 2015, Peskov and Navka became engaged. Navka holds citizenship with both Russia and the United States. They married on 1 August 2015, after Peskov finalized the divorce with his second wife. A Sobesednik article stated that their marriage occurred in June 2015. Aside from his native Russian language, Peskov is fluent in English, Turkish and Arabic. On 12 May 2020, Peskov was admitted to hospital after testing positive for COVID-19. He recovered and was discharged on 25 May.

=== Wealth ===
Peskov's wife has real estate holdings worth more than $10 million. She heads two companies that have contracts with the Russian state.

During his 2015 wedding, Peskov was photographed wearing an exclusive US$670,000 Richard Mille watch, greater than Peskov's declared income for all his years of service as a state employee. When this fact was discovered, this caused a media reaction, and Peskov replied that Navka had paid for the watch. Russian anti-corruption crusader Alexei Navalny said on 17 August that Peskov vacationed recently with his new wife off the coast of the Italian island of Sardinia on a €350,000 per week yacht called the Maltese Falcon. Navalny cited data from yacht-tracking websites and social-media posts as evidence partially corroborating his source's claims, though he presented no direct proof that Peskov had set foot on the vessel.

Established in January 2014, registered in the British Virgin Islands (BVI) and beneficially owned by Navka, Carina Global Assets had assets of more than $1 million including an apartment and liquidated in November 2015.

=== Sanctions ===
On 28 February 2022, in relation to the Russian invasion of Ukraine, the European Union blacklisted Peskov and had all his assets frozen. The United States imposed similar sanctions on 3 March, followed by Australia. The United Kingdom imposed sanctions on 15 March. The United States also sanctioned his wife, Tatiana Navka, and two of his children, Nikolay Peskov and Elizaveta Peskova. Peskov was also sanctioned by the British government in 2023.

== Awards and honours ==
National:

- Order of Honour (6 August 2007)
- Order of Friendship (22 November 2003)
- Gratitude from the President of the Russian Federation (2004, 2007)
- Gratitude from the Government of the Russian Federation (2009)

Foreign:

- Commander of the Order of Merit of the Italian Republic (Italy, 4 October 2017)
- Order of Manas, 3rd class (Kyrgyzstan, 16 June 2017)
- Order of the Polar Star (Mongolia, 2021)

Political offices
Preceded by Natalya Timakova	Kremlin Press Secretary; 2012-present	Incumbent
