= Andrey Kolesnikov (journalist, born 1966) =

Russian journalist

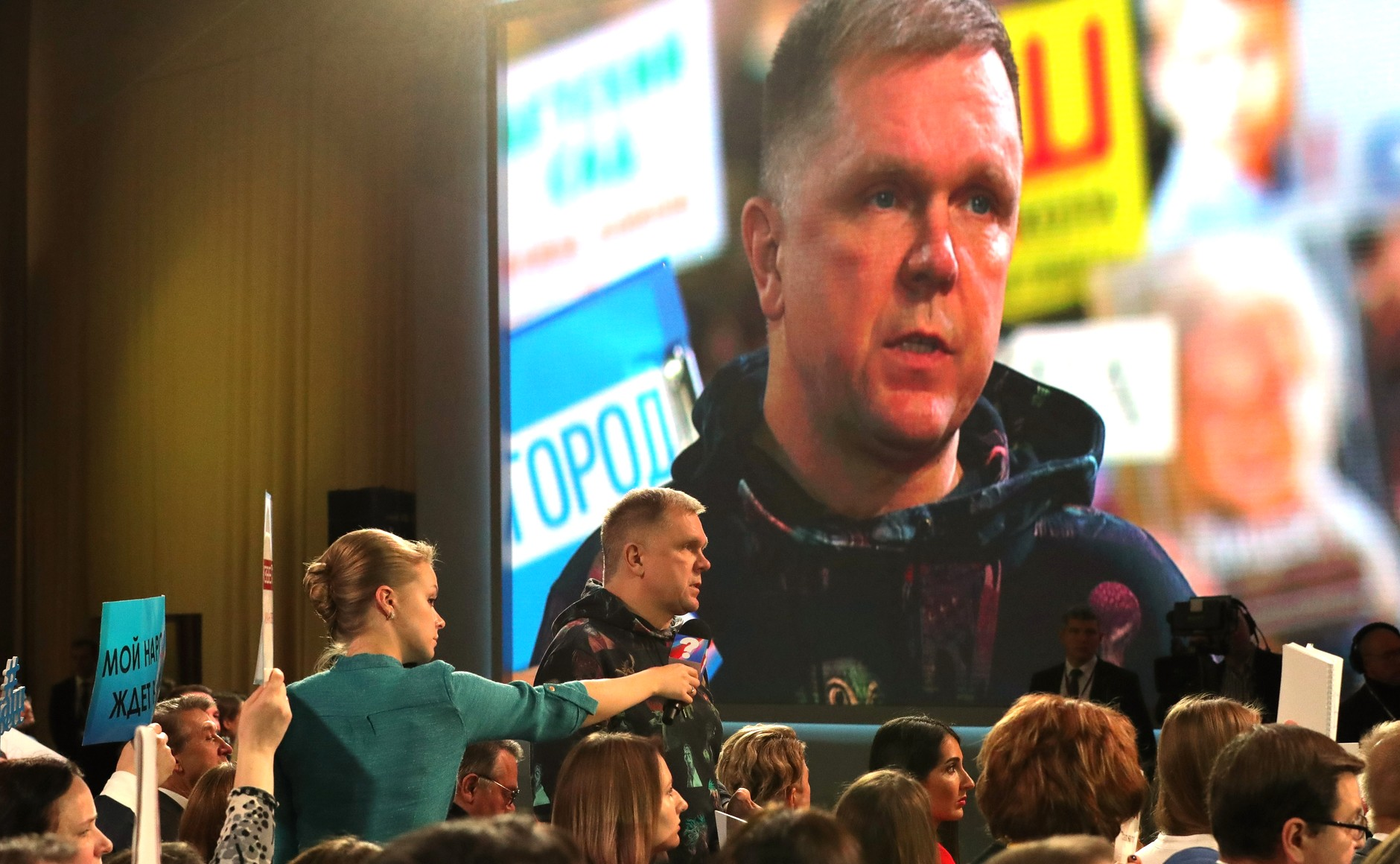
- Kolesnikov at Vladimir Putin's press conference, 2019
- Born: Andrey Ivanovich Kolesnikov; 8 August 1966 (age 60); Semibratovo, Russian SFSR, Soviet Union
- Education: MSU Faculty of Journalism
- Occupations: Journalist, columnist, editor
- Known for: Regular reports about Vladimir Putin for Kommersant
- Spouse: Darya Donskova
- Andrey Kolesnikov's voice From the Echo of Moscow program, 30 August 2004

Andrey Ivanovich Kolesnikov (Russian: Андрей Иванович Колесников) is a Russian journalist, columnist and editor. Since 2000, he has been writing regular reports about Russian president Vladimir Putin for Kommersant as a member of the Kremlin pool. He is an author of several books and articles about Putin's life.

== Biography ==
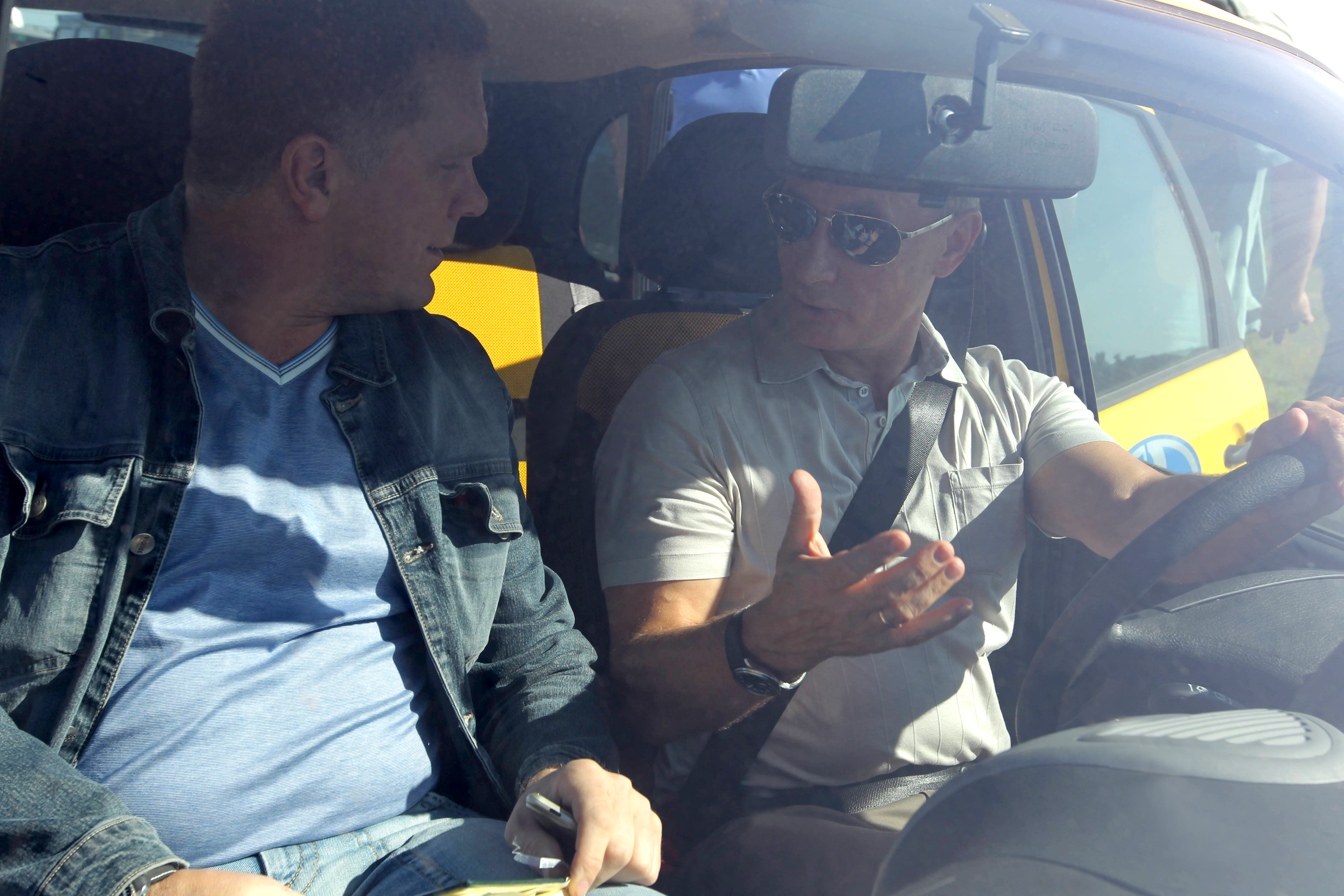
Kolesnikov interviewing Putin inside Lada Kalina during the latter's premiership, 2010

Kolesnikov was born in the urban-type settlement of Semibratovo, Yaroslavl Oblast in 1966. After receiving a degree in Moscow State University Faculty of Journalism, he wrote for Moskovskaya Pravda, Moskovskiye Novosti, and the Institute for High Energy Physics newspaper.

Since 1996, he has been working as a special correspondent for Kommersant along with Aleksandr Kabakov and Valery Panyushkin. In 2000, Kolesnikov published a book named From the First Person about Vladimir Putin co-authored by acting Kremlin spokesperson Natalya Timakova and journalist Natalya Gevorkyan.

In 2008, Kolesnikov became editor-in-chief of the Russky pioner magazine. Vladimir Putin, Sergey Lavrov, Vladislav Surkov, Mikhail Fridman, Petr Aven, Mikhail Prokhorov, Arkady Dvorkovich, Viktor Vekselberg have written columns for Russky pioner.

In 2012, Kolesnikov became deputy CEO of the Kommersant publishing house.

In March 2022, Government of Canada put Kolesnikov on its sanction list for "peddling Russian disinformation and propaganda".

== Bibliography ==
- 2000 — From the First Person (‘От первого лица’)
- 2004 — I saw Putin! (‘Я Путина видел!’)
- 2005 — Putin saw me! (‘Меня Путин видел!’)
- 2005 — Vladimir Putin. Between Europe and Asia (‘Владимир Путин. Между Европой и Азией’)
- 2005 — Vladimir Putin. Chained by One Chain (‘Владимир Путин. Скованные одной цепью’)
- 2005 — Vladimir Putin. Equiremoval of Oligarchs (‘Владимир Путин. Равноудаление олигархов’)
- 2005 — See Putin and then die: Documentary Stories (‘Увидеть Путина и умереть: документальные истории’)
- 2005 — First Ukrainian. Notes from the Front Line. (‘Первый украинский. Записки с передовой’)
- 2006 — The Olympic Gamesmanship (‘Олимпийские игрища’)
- 2007 — Father Breeding. A Textbook for Growing Up Parents (‘Отцеводство. Пособие для взрослеющих родителей’)
- 2008 — The Split of VVP. How Putin elected Medvedev (‘Раздвоение ВВП. Как Путин выбрал Медведева’)
- 2009 — Farce-majeure. Actors and Roles of Big Politics (‘Фарс-мажор. Актёры и роли большой политики’)
- 2010 — Cars, Girls, Traffic Police (‘Тачки, девушки, ГАИ’)
- 2017 — Putin. The Galley Foreman (‘Путин. Прораб на галерах’)
- 2018 — Putin. Beyond the Crane (‘Путин. Стерх всякой меры’)
- 2018 — Putin. A Man with a Brook. Journalist's Observations from behind the Wall (‘Путин. Человек с Ручьём. Наблюдения журналиста из-за Стенки’)
