= Andrei Kolesnikov =

Andrei Kolesnikov or Andrey Kolesnikov may refer to:

- Andrei Kolesnikov (footballer) (born 1984), Russian footballer
- Andrei Kolesnikov (ice hockey) (born 1989), Russian professional ice hockey defenceman
- Andrey I. Kolesnikov (born 1966), Russian journalist
- Andrey V. Kolesnikov (born 1965), Russian journalist
- Andrei Kolesnikov (general) (born 1977), Russian general
