= Nikolay Peskov =

Russian army veteran (born 1990)

- Николай Песков
- Born: Nikolay Dmitriyevich Peskov; 3 February 1990 (age 36); Moscow, Russian SFSR, Soviet Union (now Russia)
- Other names: Nikolai Choles
- Relatives: Dmitry Peskov (father); Semyon Budyonny (great-grandfather)

Nikolay Dmitriyevich Peskov (Russian: Николай Дмитриевич Песков; born 3 February 1990), also known as Nikolai Choles (Николай Чоулз) is a Russian army veteran and the son of Kremlin Press Secretary Dmitry Peskov. Raised in the United Kingdom, where he faced legal issues, Peskov has joined the Russian military and later the Wagner Group. His role in the Russian invasion of Ukraine with Wagner, for which he has been sanctioned, has been disputed.

== Biography ==
Peskov was born on 3 February 1990 in Moscow. He is the eldest son of Dmitry Peskov and Anastasia Budyonny. He is a great-grandson of Semyon Budyonny. He moved with his mother to the United Kingdom in the 1990s. Peskov sometimes uses his stepfather's surname, Choles. He was educated in Britain.

From 2010 to 2012, Peskov was in the Russian Strategic Rocket Forces and participated in the 2012 Moscow Victory Day Parade. He briefly worked as a correspondent for RT.

In 2017, Peskov's opulent lifestyle was criticized by Russian opposition politician Alexei Navalny. Peskov responded on RBK that Navalny's report was "a provocation."

In April 2023, it was reported that Peskov had joined the Wagner Group and was participating in the Russian invasion of Ukraine as an artillery man, though a conflicting report shows that when he claimed to be in Ukraine, his Tesla car (which he is the primary driver of) had been seen moving "actively" around Moscow. During this time the car has collected fines as well. The VChK-OGPU Telegram channel also asked Wagner artillerymen if they had seen him, replying: "he was nowhere to be seen in the Bakhmut area." Nikolai Peskov also claimed that he wanted to join Wagner but didn't know how "so I had to turn to my dad...and he helped me with that". Wagner chief Yevgeny Prigozhin said that Dmitry Peskov asked him to "take [Nikolai] on as a simple artilleryman". In September 2022, regarding the 2022 Russian mobilization, Russian journalist Dmitry Nizovtsev, an associate of opposition activist Alexei Navalny, called Nikolay Peskov and pretended to be a military recruitment officer. He asked Mr Peskov why he hadn't shown up to the Moscow call up centre. Mr Peskov replied: "I am Mr Peskov. I'm going to take this matter to another level...I basically need to know what's going on and what my rights are." This call was made live on YouTube. It was described in Fortune magazine as an example of nepotism in Putin's Russia.

== Personal life ==
=== Legal issues ===
Peskov spent time in a British young offender institution for stealing a mobile phone and took courses for alcohol abuse and anger management. This was after a 2010 incident when Peskov and two other men "(punched) a teenager in the face during a mobile phone theft" outside a McDonald's in Milton Keynes. He was given a 15-month sentence. Peskov claimed that he was estranged from his family and had been kicked out by his family at the age of 16.

In 2016, it was alleged that Peskov was the subject of a police investigation for beating his grandmother, Inese Budyonny, a 71-year-old pensioner.

=== Sanctions ===
On 11 March 2022, following the Russian invasion of Ukraine, Peskov was added to the list of specially designated nationals who are sanctioned by the United States Department of the Treasury as part of the international sanctions during the Russo-Ukrainian War. On 15 March 2022, Peskov was sanctioned by the United Kingdom and is banned from traveling to the country.
