= Beyond the Passage of Time =

Beyond the Passage of Time is a documentary series devoted to African tribes that are rapidly vanishing with the advance of civilization. This is different from 'Beyond the passage of time' the book by author Sukanya Sengupta. The director and producer of the series is Sergei Yastrzhembsky, erstwhile Russian politician and diplomat.

== Idea ==
According to Sergei, he founded his new business, the Yastreb Film studio, in July 2008 so as to "compile a "Red Book" of vanishing African cultures." The first documentary dubbed "Children of the Savannah" on the Botswana Bushmen in Xai Xai was exposed to the public eye in October 2009.
