= Fatima Tlisova =

Russian-American journalist (born 1966)

- Фатима Тлисова
- Alma mater: Harvard University; Stavropol State University
- Occupation: Journalist, researcher, expert
- Employer: Polygraph.info; Voice of America
- Awards: Rory Peck Award (2005); Free Media Awards (2006); Amnesty International UK Media Awards (2008); Nieman Fellowship (2009)

Fatima Tlis or Tlisova (Adyghe: Лъыс Фэтимэ; born 1966) is a Russian-American investigative journalist of Circassian ethnicity, researcher and expert on Russia.

== Life in Russia ==
Fatima Tlis graduated from Stavropol State University, Russia, with a Master of Arts degree in Russian language and literature.

== Refugee status ==
Tlisova claimed refugee status after facing severe intimidation after reporting on attempts to counter increasing Islamic and Chechen insurgency in the violent North Caucasus region following the outbreak of the Second Chechen War. She reported being assaulted repeatedly since 2002, allegedly for filing reports not favorable to the Governments and Secret Services of the Republics of the North Caucasus, as well as the federal government of Vladimir Putin. She reported being beaten, having had her ribs broken repeatedly, having poisons administered, being kidnapped, and hVING cigarettes extinguished on her skin, and had her teenage son face harassment by the police.

After more than a month of speculation in the media, on 2007-06-28 the New York-based Committee to Protect Journalists announced that Tlisova, along with Radio Liberty reporter Yuri Bagrov, had been granted political asylum in the United States, but after reports by her denying this, the announcement was changed to say that they had received "refugee status".

== Persecution ==
Subsequently, she became the editor-in-chief of the Caucasus desk for the Regnum News Agency. Since 2005, she was also working with the Associated Press. She had travelled widely in the region, filing reports from Adygea to Dagestan.

Her conflict with the authorities started in 2002, shortly after she published an article about abusive practices of militias in Chechnya in the Obschaya Gazeta". One night, after a birthday party celebrating her 36th birthday, she had gone to the door of her apartment building to see off her guests. After they left, she was dragged around a corner and beaten by two men. She was treated in hospital for broken ribs, concussion and other injuries.

In January 2005, she faced considerable harassment for a series of articles about the murder of seven shareholders in the firm Kavkaztsement. A few months earlier, they had challenged the firm's majority shareholder Ali Kaitov, nephew of the Republic president Mustafa Batdyev. Shortly after they went to see Kaitov at his dacha, gunshots were heard from the vicinity, and the seven disappeared. They included Rasul Bogatyrev, a deputy in the state legislature; the family of the murdered raised vigorous protests, and the case drew considerable attention in the international press. The relatives of the murdered people wrote to Vladimir Putin, saying that considering the dacha near which their sons disappeared belonged to the son-in-law of the republic's president, they were compelled to express "categorical distrust in both the law-enforcement organs and the organs of state power of Karachaevo-Cherkessia" in investigating this case. After a month of official inaction, four of the seven bodies were found at the bottom of a mine; they had been dismembered and burnt with tyres as fuel. Subsequently, a large rally protesting the local government overcame teargas and reinforced police lines to take over the presidential palace. Tlisova reported from the scene, saying "Almost all of offices in the White House [government building] have been ransacked. There is no information available yet about the whereabouts of President Batdyev. Almost every window in the building is broken. The surrounding area is filled with paper and broken furniture. Some government officials and ministers are watching the events from the streets adjacent to the White House."

Following Tlisova's coverage revealing further details of the murders, the Kabardino-Balkarian Interior Ministry withdrew her accreditation. She was accused of illegally receiving a pension and criminal proceedings were initiated, but were later dropped.

Shortly after this, she was forced into a vehicle. Federalnaya Sluzhba Bezopasnosti (Federal Security Services, FSB) agents then took her to a nearby forest and extinguished cigarettes on the fingers of her right hand, "so that you can write better". She also reports two occasions when she feels she had been poisoned - once in October 2003 when she applied face cream, from a jar in her own home, which peeled the skin from her face and fingers, and another time when she lost consciousness after sipping some tea, and ended up with serious heart damage.

On October 8, 2006, one day after the murder of Anna Politkovskaya in Moscow, she sent her 16-year-old son on an errand and he failed to return. Eventually she traced him to a police station in the custody of a drunken policeman who had put his name on a list of Chechen sympathizers. According to human rights advocates, people on these lists are usually savagely beaten, and may even vanish forever. In an interview with Jim Heintz of the Associated Press, Tlisova explained her desire for asylum, saying "Do you know what these lists are? These are lists of broken lives. The fact that a drunken policeman can drag an innocent young man into a police station in broad daylight and put him on such a list - I didn't want that to happen to my son."

A few weeks later, she came home one night to find signs that her apartment had been broken into. The next morning, she fell violently ill, and fainted. Medical tests revealed acute kidney failure, but in a few days she had recovered, and her kidneys were functioning normally. She believes that an intruder put poison in her food.

== Asylum and impact on US-Russia relations ==
In March 2007, Tlisova went to the United States for a two-year program to study journalism. In early March, the Sunday Times reported that she had asked for asylum, but she denied this. On June 1, the paper "Caucasian Knot" reported that she had been granted asylum, and rumours persisted.

On 2007-06-28, Tlisova and Bagrov, along with the Committee to Protect Journalists, met the Congressional Human Rights Caucus chaired by Representative Tom Lantos. In a press release on the event, the CPJ said "This spring, unable to continue their work unobstructed, Bagrov and Tlisova were granted political asylum, and they resettled in the United States." However, a report a few days later from her workplace, Regnum news agency, quoted her as denying this, saying "There is only one thing true in what has been reported about me: I did take place in a round-table discussion at the US Congress. I am staying in America to study; after it I intend to continue working in Caucasus." The report labelled rumours of her asylum as an "information campaign". At some point, the relevant paragraph in the CPJ announcement was also revised, with an editor's note. The new text says that Tlisova and Bagrov had received refugee status.

In her interviews about moving to the United States, Tlisova said that while welcoming the security it gave her family, she also felt that she could not remain silent about the violence in her homeland. At another point, she said "I see my further work only in Caucasus".

The asylum for the dissident journalists gave rise to speculation that the United States and its allies were taking a hard line with Russia, especially when shortly afterwards, four Russian diplomats were expelled from the United Kingdom, after Russia refused to extradite FSB agent Andrei Lugovoi, who is suspected of poisoning Alexander Litvinenko.

Tlisova is a fellow of the National Endowment for Democracy. During her fellowship she produces articles and short documentaries about journalists exiled from the North Caucasus.

== Awards and honours ==
- 2005 Rory Peck Trust Award.
- 2006 Gerd Bucerius Prize for Free Press in Eastern Europe.
- 2008 Amnesty International UK Media Award.
- 2008 Human Rights Watch Hellman-Hammett Award.
- 2009 Louis Lyons Award for Conscience and Integrity in Journalism.

== See also ==
- Yelena Maglevannaya
- Yelena Tregubova
