= Pavel Voshchanov =

Kremlin Press Secretary
- In office 20 July 1991 – 14 May 1992
- President: Boris Yeltsin
- Preceded by: Position established Vladimir Mezentsev as Yeltsin's Parliamentary Press Secretary
- Succeeded by: Vyacheslav Kostikov

Personal details
- Born: November 3, 1948 (age 77) Moscow, Soviet Union
- Education: Tashkent State University of Economics
- Awards: Medal of 13 January

Pavel Igorevich Voshchanov (Russian: Павел Игоревич Вощанов; born November 3, 1948) is a Soviet and Russian journalist, who was one of the founders and political observer of Novaya Gazeta, and Kremlin Press Secretary to Boris Yeltsin from July 1991 to February 1992.

== Biography ==
He was born on November 3, 1948, in Moscow to a military family who served in East Germany from 1950 to 1963. After his father's death, he was transferred to the Uzbek SSR, where Voshchanov received a higher education in economics from the Tashkent Institute of National Economy (now the Tashkent State University of Economics). In 1976 he defended his dissertation for the degree of Candidate of Economic Sciences. In the 1980s, he worked in the management of the Scientific Research Institute for Construction Economics (NIIES) of State Committee for Construction, where he defended his doctoral dissertation in 1984.

After the reorganization of the institute in 1987 into the Institute of Construction Economics and Management, there was no place for Voshchanov; he became a research fellow at the Institute of Economics of the Soviet Academy of Sciences. Since 1989, he has been an economics columnist for Komsomolskaya Pravda.

In 1990 he was elected as a delegate to the 28th Congress of the Communist Party of the Soviet Union and a delegate to the founding congress of the Communist Party of the Russian Soviet Federative Socialist Republic. During the 1991 Soviet coup attempt, it was Voshchanov who held press conferences within the White House. In February 1992, due to growing personal disagreements with Yeltsin, he resigned.

In 1996, he received the Golden Pen of Russia award from the Union of Journalists of Russia for his work at Komsomolskaya Pravda. In the 1990s, he also served on the editorial board of the Tribuna newspaper, published in the weekly Delovoy Vtored (Business Tuesday), and headed Radio-1 in 1999. In 1995, 1998, and 1999, he ran unsuccessfully for the State Duma. He also ran unsuccessfully for the Moscow City Duma.
