= Yuri Gryadunov =

Soviet and Russian diplomat (1929–2020)

- Юрий Грядунов
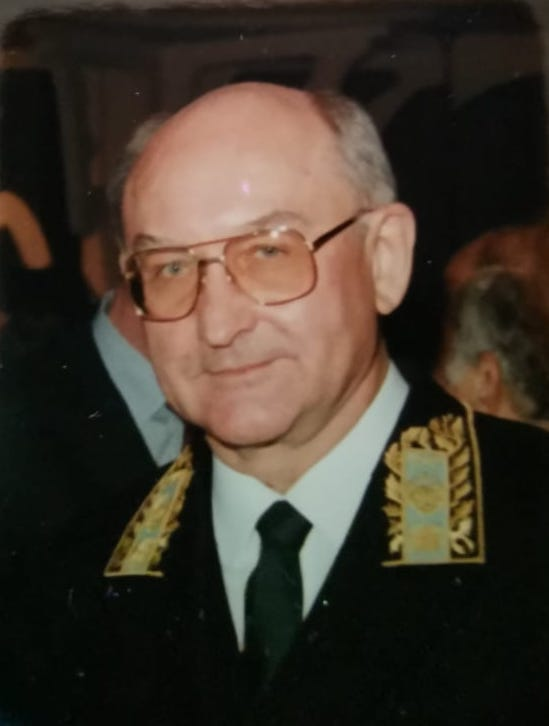
- Gryadunov in 1990

Ambassador of the Soviet Union/Russia to Jordan
- In office 7 February 1990 – 22 April 1992
- Preceded by: Aleksandr Zinchuk
- Succeeded by: Aleksandr Saltanov

Personal details
- Born: 2 December 1929 Sladkoye, Krutinsky District, Omsk Oblast, Russian Soviet Federative Socialist Republic, USSR
- Died: 8 May 2020 (aged 90)
- Awards: Order of the Badge of Honour; Order of Friendship of Peoples; Order of the Red Banner of Labour; Medal "For Labour Valour"

Yuri Stepanovich Gryadunov (Russian: Юрий Степанович Грядунов; 2 December 1929 – 8 May 2020) was a Soviet and Russian diplomat. He served in various diplomatic roles from the 1950s onwards, specialising in the Middle Eastern region, ending his career as Ambassador of Russia to Jordan.

== Career ==
Gryadunov was born on 2 December 1929 in the village of Sladkoye, in Krutinsky District, Omsk Oblast, then part of the Russian Soviet Federative Socialist Republic, in the Soviet Union. After completing his schooling in 1948, he enrolled in the Moscow Institute of Oriental Studies, graduating in 1953, and joining the Ministry of Foreign Affairs. His first posting was to work in the ministry's Information Committee from 1953 until 1958, after which he was appointed Second, and later First, Secretary at the Soviet embassy in Iraq. He completed this posting in 1963, returning to the Soviet Union to become First Secretary of the Foreign Ministry's Department of the Middle East, and until 1975, assistant, deputy section head, and team leader, in the Middle East and North Africa section at the International Department of the Communist Party of the Soviet Union. From 1975 until 1990 Gryadunov was head of the Middle East and North Africa section of the International Department. In 1990 he was appointed Soviet ambassador to Jordan, continuing in the post after the dissolution of the Soviet Union in 1991, until his retirement in 1992.

Over his career Gryadunov received a number of awards, including the Order of the Badge of Honour, the Order of Friendship of Peoples, the Order of the Red Banner of Labour, and the Medal "For Labour Valour". He had been a member of the Imperial Orthodox Palestine Society since 1980, and a member of the Chamber of Commerce and Industry of the Russian Federation.

Gryadunov died on 8 May 2020. The Russian Ministry of Foreign Affairs announced his death, describing him as "highly professional" and noting that he "enjoyed great respect among colleagues."
