= Vyacheslav Kostikov =

Russian diplomat, journalist and writer

- Вячеслав Костиков

Kremlin Press Secretary
- In office 14 May 1992 – 14 March 1995
- President: Boris Yeltsin
- Preceded by: Pavel Voshchanov
- Succeeded by: Sergey Medvedev

Personal details
- Born: 24 August 1940 (age 85) Moscow, RSFSR, Soviet Union
- Education: University of Sheffield; Academy of Foreign Trade
- Occupation: Russian diplomat, journalist and writer
- Vyacheslav Kostikov's voice Kostikov reading his memoirs Recorded 11 November 2013

Vyacheslav Vasilyevich Kostikov (Russian: Вячеслав Васильевич Костиков; born 24 August 1940) is a Russian diplomat, journalist and writer who served as the press secretary to the first Russian president Boris Yeltsin.

== Biography ==
In 1966, he graduated from MSU Faculty of Journalism. From 1966 to 1967 he worked as an English translator in India. Since 1967 he has been working as a political columnist for the RIA Novosti.

In 1968 Kostikov studied journalism in England, at the University of Sheffield. At the same time, he continued his studies at the Academy of Foreign Trade (1972). Then he started worked for UNESCO (1972–78 and 1982–1988).

From 1992 to 1994 he served as the press secretary of the president of the Russian Federation. In 1994–1996 he was the representative of the Russian Federation at the Vatican and the Sovereign Military Order of Malta.

Presently, he is the Director for Strategic Planning of Russian newspaper Argumenty i Fakty.

Political offices
Preceded by Pavel Voshchanov	Kremlin Press Secretary; 14 May 1992-14 March 1995	Succeeded by Sergey Medvedev
