= Sergey Medvedev =

Russian journalist (born 1958)

- Сергей Медведев
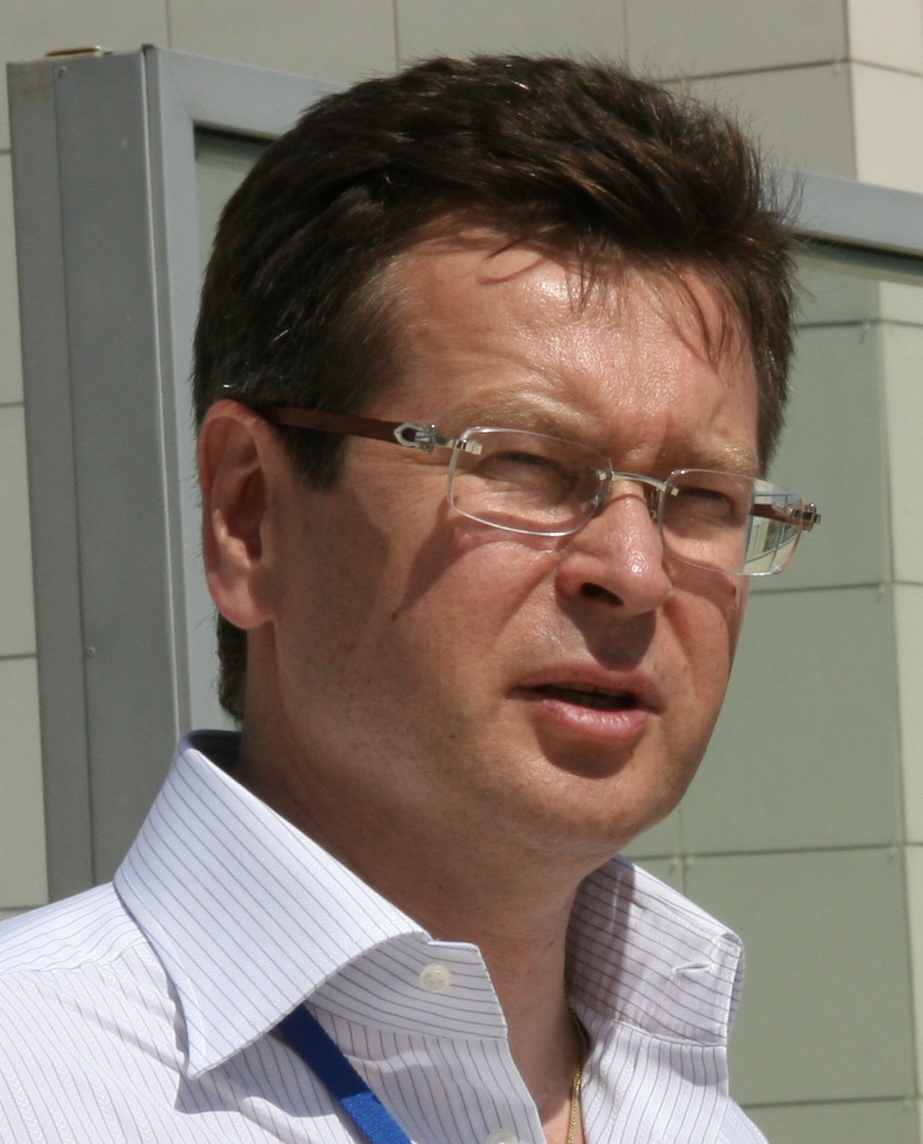
- Medvedev in 2007

Kremlin Press Secretary
- In office 13 August 1996 – 12 September 1998
- President: Boris Yeltsin
- Preceded by: Vyacheslav Kostikov
- Succeeded by: Sergey Yastrzhembsky

Personal details
- Born: Sergey Konstantinovich Medvedev; 2 June 1958 (age 68) Kaliningrad, Soviet Union
- Education: Moscow State University
- Occupation: Journalist
- Awards: (1993); TEFI (2002).
- Years active: 1981–present
- Label: Ostankino

Sergey Konstantinovich Medvedev (Note: Russian: Серге́й Константи́нович Медве́дев) (born 2 June 1958) is a Russian journalist and TV presenter who would later become the press secretary of Russian president Boris Yeltsin from 1995 to 1996. He has the federal state civilian service rank of 1st class Active State Councillor of the Russian Federation.

== Biography ==
Sergey Medvedev was born on 2 June 1958, in Kaliningrad. His interest in journalism started from an early age, his career beginning in a local paper. In 1981 he graduated from Moscow State University’s Faculty of Journalism, having also been trained at Gosplan economics courses.

From 1981 to 1991 he worked in the USSR State Committee for Television and Radio Broadcasting. Following the cessation of the Soviet news program Vremya as a result of the August 1991 coup, Medvedev worked as a presenter at Information Programs Studios of All-Union State Broadcasting Company Ostankino. In this capacity he served as a presenter for Vremya’s replacement program TV-Inform.

Between 1995 and 1996 he was the press secretary of the Russian president Boris Yeltsin. Following his resignation as press secretary, Medvedev returned to television and became the first deputy general director of ORT. In 2000, Medvedev took part in the elections to the State Duma from the Kaliningrad district number 84 as an independent candidate, but the results of voting placed him second.

Together with Alexey Pimanov he is the founder of one of the largest broadcasting companies of the country Ostankino, which creates the content for the first and other federal channels in Russia. Since 2003 Medvedev has been the chairman of the board of directors.

He is a member of the Russian Union of Journalists and the Union of Cinematographers of Russia.

== Notes ==
Political offices
Preceded by Vyacheslav Kostikov	Kremlin Press Secretary; 15 March 1995-13 August 1996	Succeeded by Sergey Yastrzhembsky
