= Jelena =

Jelena is a Slavic given name.

The name is a Slavicized form of the Greek name Helena, and it signifies the word ‘Greek’ (Ελληνικά) meaning bright, light. Helena comes from Helios, meaning shining and sunlight. Diminutives of the name include Jelica, Jelka, Jele, Jela, Lena, Lenochka, Jeca, and Lenka.

== Notable people ==
=== Nobility ===
- Saint Jelena of Serbia, Serbian Queen (d. 1314)
- Jelena of Bulgaria, Empress consort of Serbia (d. 1374)
- Jelena Petrović Njegoš, Montenegrin princess and Queen of Italy
- Jelena of Serbia (disambiguation), many Serbian consorts
- Jelena Urošević Vukanović, Queen consort of Hungary
- Jelena Zrinski, Princess Consort of Transylvania and Croatian noblewoman

=== Other people ===
- Jelena Agbaba, Serbian handball player
- Jelena Blagojević, Serbian volleyball player
- Jelena Brooks (Milovanović), Serbian basketball player
- Jelena Čanković (born 1995), Serbian footballer
- Jelena Čubrilo (born 1994), Serbian footballer
- Jelena Dokić, Australian tennis player of Croatian and Serbian origin
- Jelena Glebova, Estonian figure skater
- Jelena 'Gigi' Noura Hadid, American model
- Jelena Grubišić, Croatian handball player
- Jelena Janković, Serbian tennis player
- Jelena Jovanova, Macedonian actress
- Jelena Karleuša, Serbian singer
- Jelena Kovacevic, Serbian-American engineering professor and dean
- Jelena Lavko, Serbian handball player
- Jelena McWilliams (Obrenic), Serbian-American business executive
- Jelena Mrdjenovich, Serbian-Canadian boxer
- Jelena Nikolić, Serbian volleyball player
- Jeļena Ostapenko, Latvian tennis player
- Jelena Porsanger (born 1967), Russian Sami ethnographer and university rector
- Jeļena Prokopčuka, Latvian long-distance runner
- Jelena Rozga, Croatian singer
- Jelena Tripolski (born 1967), Israeli Olympic sport shooter
- Jelena Trivić, Serbian politician from Bosnia and Herzegovina

== Related names ==
- Helen, Helena, Yelena, Elena, Elaine, Ellen, Alyona, Alyena, Aliena, Olyena, Alena
