= Sergey Yastrzhembsky =

Russian statesman and diplomat

- Сергей Ястржембский
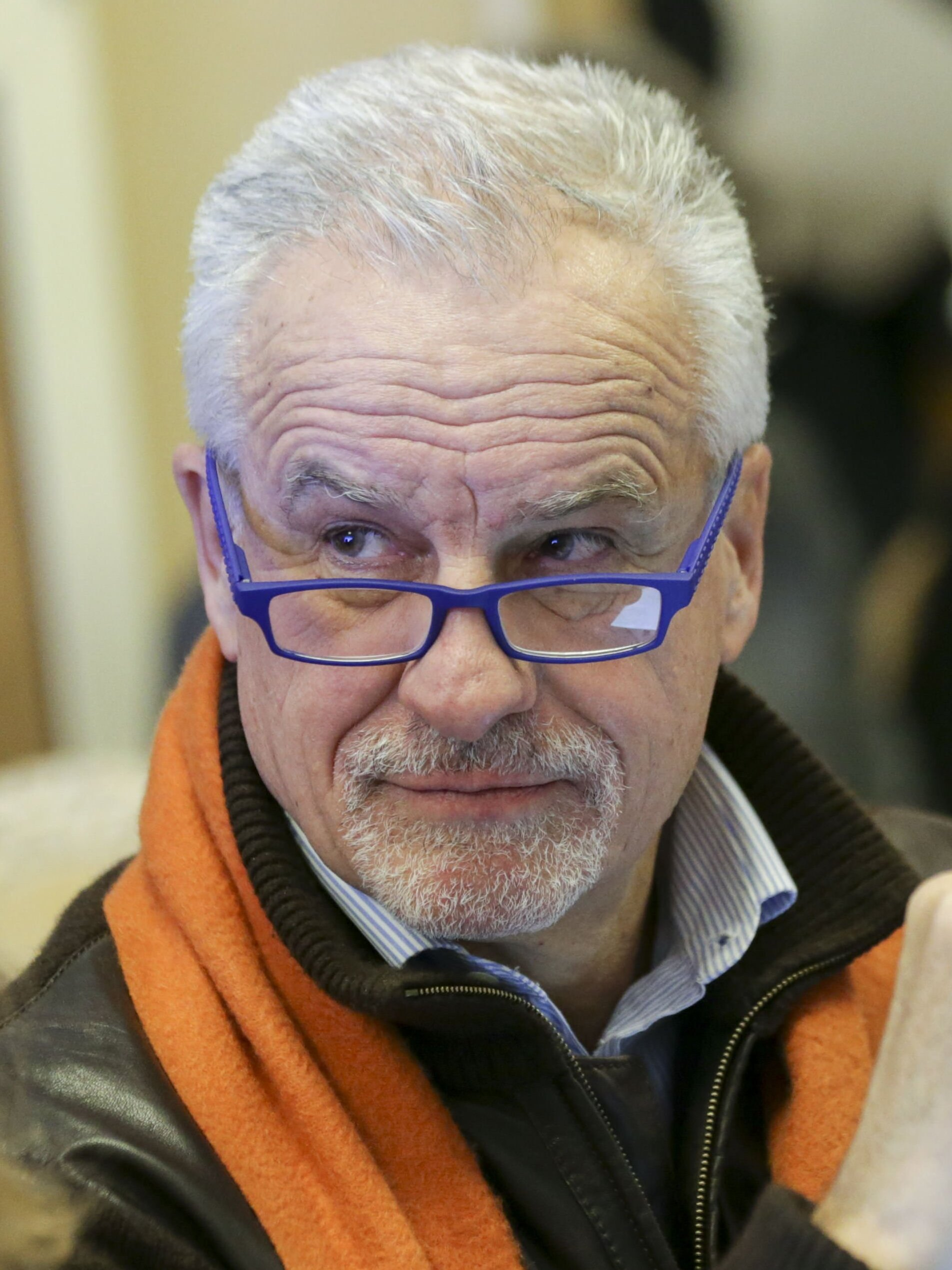
- Yastrzhembsky in 2018

Kremlin Press Secretary
- In office 12 August 1996 – 12 September 1998
- President: Boris Yeltsin
- Preceded by: Sergey Medvedev
- Succeeded by: Dmitry Yakushkin

Russian Ambassador to Slovakia
- In office 3 June 1993 – 13 August 1996
- President: Boris Yeltsin
- Preceded by: Office established
- Succeeded by: Sergey Zotov

Personal details
- Born: Sergey Vladimirovich Yastrzhembsky; 14 December 1953 (age 72) Moscow, Russian SFSR, Soviet Union
- Party: Communist Party of the Soviet Union
- Education: MGIMO

Sergey Vladimirovich Yastrzhembsky (Russian: Серге́й Владимирович Ястржембский, Polish: Siergiej Władimirowicz Jastrzębski; born December 4, 1953) is a Russian statesman and diplomat. He has the federal state civilian service rank of 1st class Active State Councillor of the Russian Federation.

He was Boris Yeltsin's Spokesperson from 12 August 1996 to 12 September 1998.

== Biography ==
=== Education and early career ===
Yatrzhembsky descends from the szlachta of the Grand Duchy of Lithuania. He was educated at Moscow State Institute of Foreign Relations (MGIMO), under the Soviet Union's Foreign Ministry in 1976, and as a postgraduate at the Soviet Academy of Sciences' Institute of the International Workers' Movement in 1979, where he earned a Ph.D. in history.

From 1990 to 1991, Yastrzhembsky was the Megapolis magazine's deputy editor-in-chief.

From 1991 to 1992, He was VIP ("Very Important Person") (Russian: "Очень важная персона") magazine's editor-in-chief and the deputy general director at the Social and Political Research Fund (Gobachev-Fund) (Russian: Международного фонда социально-политических исследований (Горбачев-фонд)).

=== Yeltsin era ===
From April 1992 to 1993, he was appointed by Andrei Kozyrev to be director of the Department of Information and Press of the Ministry of Foreign Affairs of the Russian Federation (Russian: Департамент информации и печати МИД РФ, Departament informatsii i pechati MID RF).

In 1992-1996, he was in the diplomatic service, holding different positions including the post of the Russian ambassador to Slovakia while Alexei Gromov was the consul of the Consulate General of the Russian Federation in the Slovak Republic and later the minister-counselor of the embassy: both Gromov and Yastrzhmbsky represented Russia's interests during the breakup of Czechoslovakia into the Czech Republic and the Slovak Republic. Yastrzhembsky was promoted to the diplomatic rank of the Ambassador Extraordinary and Plenipotentiary, the highest diplomatic rank in the Russian Federation, by the Decree of the President of Russia of 20 June 1994 No. 1287.

Since 13 August 1996, he worked as President Boris Yeltsin's chief spokesperson. Yastrzhembsky was promoted to the rank of the 1st class Active State Councillor of the Russian Federation, the highest federal state civilian service rank in the Russian Federation, by the Decree of the President of Russia of 10 March 1997 No. 204. On 12 September 1998, he was dismissed from the post of the President's chief spokesperson.

After leaving the Presidential Administration of Russia and vacation in Africa, where he met his future wife, Yastrzhembsky began to work in the Government of Moscow. The period of his service in this state body lasted two years, from 1998 to 2000.

=== Putin era ===
Yastrzhembsky is a staunch supporter of Vladimir Putin and has consistently countered criticism of Putin.

Since 20 January 2000, Yastrzhembsky worked as President Putin's chief spokesperson on the conflict in Chechnya for 14 months before receiving promotion in March 2001 to head the Kremlin's Information Policy Department, co-ordinating all Putin's external communications.

Yastrzhembsky worked to lessen the impact the sinking of the Kursk had upon Putin.

In 2004, Putin made him presidential special envoy to the EU in Brussels, where he earned a reputation for maladroit statements. That position, Vedomosti reported on 8 May 2008, would become defunct when he left the post after Putin steps down. Towards the end of his posting to Brussels, Yastrzhembsky warned the EU that recognizing Kosovo's independence would open a "Pandora's box" of separatism in Europe.

In an interview with Vladimir Pozner, Yastrzhembsky told that Putin was extremely dissatisfied with his notice of resignation and became angry with him.

=== Post civil service ===
In 2008 after leaving the civil service, Yastrzhembsky worked to establish a Russian-Italian investment bank which would be supported by both the Intesa banking group and VEB.

=== Yastreb Film ===
In 2009, he established "Yastreb Film" also called the "Sergey Yastrzhembsky Studio" (Russian: Студия Сергея Ястржембского), which is a company that produces documentaries including the series "Out of Time" which was dedicated to the disappearing peoples of Africa.

In 2009, he was involved in making a series of documentary films on traditional African people, entitled "Beyond the Passage of Time".

== Personal ==
Yastrzhembsky is an avid hunter that enjoys trophy hunting. Sergei Chemezov, who became a avid hunter during his days in Dresden, loves hunting in Czechoslovakia, the Czech Republic and Slovakia where Chemezov hunted with Yastrzhembsky who was the Russian Ambassador to Slovakia from 3 June 1993 to 13 August 1996. Yastrzhembsky allegedly travelled to Montana and shot a bighorn sheep while he was in the Rocky Mountains and posted his hunting trophy on the Moscow-based Russian Club of Mountain Hunters website (Russian: Клуб Горных Охотников) on which website he is listed in its hall of fame as a mountain hunters club award winner receiving the Russian Mountain Hunter's Cup; the Goats of the World SUPER 40; the Diamond Level for The Great Caucacus Prize, Russian Caucasian Prize, the Snow Sheep of Russia and Chamois of the World; the silver level for Capricorns of the World; Owners of the "Mountain Five" (Russian: Обладатели "Горной пятерки") and, at the level of a Grand Slam Club/Ovis (GSCO) award-winning Russian hunter (Russian: Российские охотники, отмеченные наградами GSCO), with numerous awards including the Conklin Award, OVIS World Slam super 30, Сapra World Slam Super 30, OVIS Grand Slam, and TRIPLE SLAM. (Note: In 1956, The Grand Slam Club (GSCO) was founded loosely by Bob Housholder and supports conservation efforts for wild sheep.)

Yastrzhembsky speaks English, French, Portuguese, Czech, Slovak, and Italian.

As of 2014, Yastrzhembsky is close to Mark Franchetti who is The Sunday Times veteran Moscow correspondent.

== Notes ==
Political offices
| Preceded by Sergey Medvedev | Kremlin Press Secretary; 13 August 1995-12 September 1998 | Succeeded by Dmitry Yakushkin |
