= Polygraph.info =

Fact-checking website

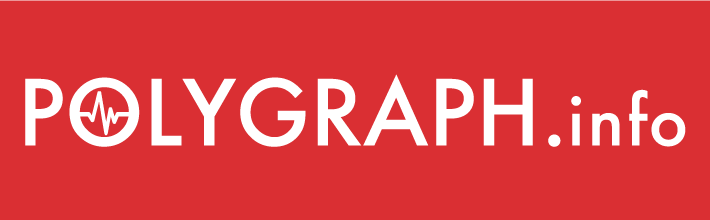
- Website type: Fact-checking
- Available in: English
- Owner: Voice of America
- Founders: Voice of America and Radio Free Europe/Radio Liberty
- Editor: Fatima Tlisova
- Website: www.voanews.com/fact-checks
- Commercial: No
- Launched: 6 December 2016; 9 years ago
- Current status: Active
- Written in: HTML, JavaScript

Polygraph.info is a fact-checking website produced by Voice of America (VoA). Among many subjects, the website documents Russian disinformation and state-backed propaganda by the Chinese government.

The website launched on December 6, 2016. Radio Free Europe funded a three-person team at Polygraph.info until February 2017. The team was led by Daily Beast senior editor Michael Weiss.

According to a 2018 article in Government Executive, by providing fact-checks in both English and Russian, VOA "builds on the success of its year-old Russian-language television network Current Time TV."

As of April 2020, the project employed five people. VoA journalist Jim Fry was its managing editor from November 2017 to November 2019. Investigative journalist, researcher, and Russian expert Fatima Tlisova also works at Polygraph.info.
