= List of ambassadors of Russia to Oman =

Ambassador of the Russian Federation to the Sultanate of Oman
- Emblem of the Russian Foreign Ministry
- Incumbent; Oleg Levin since 8 October 2024
- Ministry of Foreign Affairs; Embassy of Russia in Muscat
- Style: His Excellency; The Honourable
- Reports to: Minister of Foreign Affairs
- Seat: Muscat
- Appointer: President of Russia
- Term length: At the pleasure of the president
- Website: Embassy of Russia in Oman

The ambassador of Russia to Oman is the official representative of the president and the government of the Russian Federation to the sultan and the government of Oman.

The ambassador and his staff work at large in the Russian embassy in Muscat. The current Russian ambassador to Oman is Oleg Levin, incumbent since 8 October 2024.

== History of diplomatic relations ==
Diplomatic relations between the Soviet Union and Oman were established on 26 September 1985. Diplomatic relations were initially handled through the Soviet embassy in Jordan, with the Soviet ambassador to Jordan, Aleksandr Zinchuk, given dual accreditation to Oman from 5 February 1986. The embassy in Muscat was opened in 1987, and Awdy Kulyýew was appointed chargé d'affaires from then until the appointment of the first ambassador solely accredited to Oman, Viktor Posuvalyuk, on 23 March 1988. With the dissolution of the Soviet Union in 1991, Oman recognised the Russian Federation as its successor state, and the incumbent Soviet ambassador, Aleksandr Patsev, continued as the Russian ambassador until 1996.

== List of representatives of Russia to Oman (1986–present) ==
=== Ambassadors of the Soviet Union to Oman (1986–1991) ===
Name	Title	Appointment	Termination	Notes
Aleksandr Zinchuk	Ambassador	5 February 1986	1987	Concurrently ambassador to Jordan
Awdy Kulyýew	Chargé d'affaires	1987	1988	
Viktor Posuvalyuk	Ambassador	23 March 1988	1990	
Aleksandr Patsev	Ambassador	15 June 1990	25 December 1991	

=== Ambassadors of the Russian Federation to Oman (1991–present) ===
Name	Title	Appointment	Termination	Notes
Aleksandr Patsev	Ambassador	25 December 1991	2 November 1996	
Yuri Savostyanov	Ambassador	18 March 1997	5 December 2001	
Vladimir Nosenko	Ambassador	5 December 2001	26 August 2005	
Sergey Ivanov	Ambassador	26 August 2005	1 November 2011	
Sergey Peskov	Ambassador	1 November 2011	27 December 2013	
Envarbik Fazelyanov	Ambassador	27 December 2013	21 December 2017	
Dmitry Dogadkin	Ambassador	21 December 2017	9 November 2021	
Ilya Morgunov	Ambassador	9 November 2021	8 October 2024	Credentials presented on 9 May 2022
Oleg Levin	Ambassador	8 October 2024		Credentials presented on 9 April 2025
