= Sergey Peskov =

Soviet-Russian diplomat (1948–2014)

- Сергей Песков
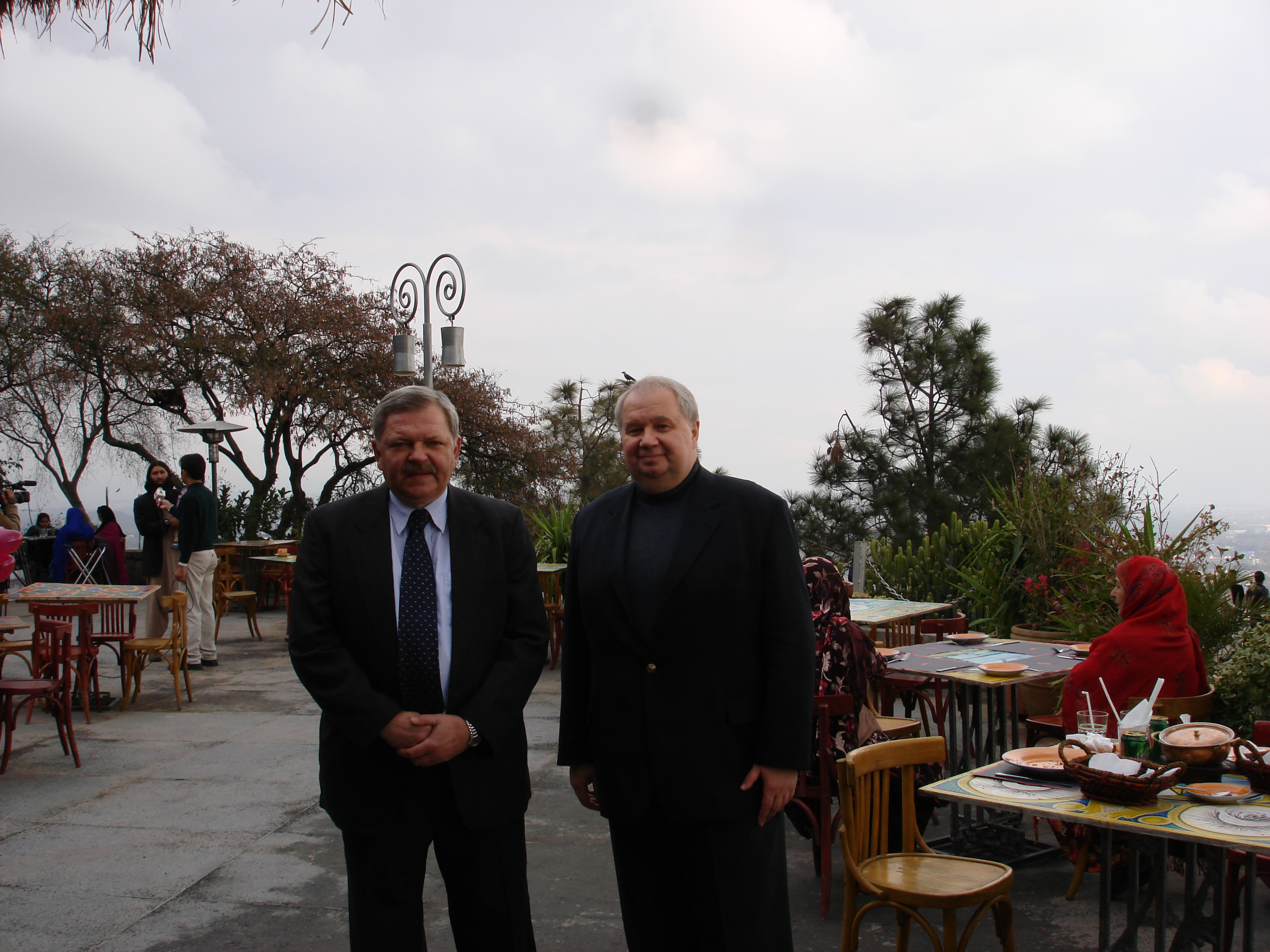
- Peskov (left) with Sergey Kislyak in 2007

Ambassador Extraordinary and Plenipotentiary of Russia to Oman
- In office 1 November 2011 – 27 December 2013
- President: Dmitry Medvedev; Vladimir Putin
- Preceded by: Sergey Ivanov
- Succeeded by: Envarbik Fazelyanov

Ambassador Extraordinary and Plenipotentiary of Russia to Pakistan
- In office 12 July 2004 – 30 September 2008
- President: Vladimir Putin; Dmitry Medvedev
- Preceded by: Eduard Shevchenko
- Succeeded by: Andrey Budnik

Personal details
- Born: 24 May 1948
- Died: 27 May 2014 (aged 66) Moscow, Russia
- Children: Dmitry Peskov (son)
- Education: Institute of Asian and African Countries, Moscow State University
- Awards: Medal of the Order "For Merit to the Fatherland" Second Class

Sergey Nikolaevich Peskov (Russian: Сергей Николаевич Песков; 24 May 1948 – 27 May 2014) was a Soviet-Russian diplomat who served as the Russian Ambassador to Pakistan from 2005 to 2009, and Russian Ambassador to Oman (2011–2013). He is the father of Dmitry Peskov who is the Press Secretary for the President of Russia, Vladimir Putin.
