= Yelena Tregubova =

Russian journalist

- Born: Yelena Tregubova; May 24, 1973 (age 53); Moscow, Russian SFSR, Soviet Union
- Education: Moscow State University
- Occupations: Journalist, author
- Writing career
- Period: 1997–present
- Subjects: Politics, free speech, censorship
- Notable works: The Tales of a Kremlin Digger (2003); The Farewell of the Kremlin Digger (2004)

Yelena Tregubova (Russian: Елена Трегубова; born May 24, 1973) is a Russian journalist. Her book The Tales of a Kremlin Digger detailed her work in the Kremlin pool.

== Biography ==
Tregubova studied journalism at Moscow State University in the 1990s. She started her career as a journalist with the newspaper Nezavisimaya Gazeta. Between 1997 and 2001, Tregubova was a member of the Kremlin press pool, reporting for the independent Moscow dailies Kommersant, Izvestia, and Russky Telegraf. The members of this "Kremlin Pool" are reporters who cover the work of Russian presidents (Boris Yeltsin and later Vladimir Putin) for television and major newspapers. During this time she interviewed many top members of Kremlin's administration, including Putin, Alexander Voloshin and Anatoliy Chubais.

== Conflict with Kremlin administration ==
Tregubova's reporting often irritated Kremlin administration, which resulted in sanctions. Alexey Gromov, a press secretary of Putin, often excluded her from official briefings, where all other correspondents were present. According to her book, The Tales of a Kremlin Digger, Gromov said that was a directive of Putin, and Putin was especially furious when she asked him about his relations with Boris Berezovsky, who started criticizing Putin's "Power vertical" in May 2000. She described her conversation with Gromov when he criticized her newspaper Kommersant for reprinting negative materials about Putin's policies from Western newspapers. He asked her: "Are you going to blame Putin for stiffing independent media when we start the dekulakization of Berezovsky?"

In the end of 2000, Tregubova was replaced in the Kremlin press pool by another correspondent. Kommersant Editor-in-Chief Andrey Vasiliev gave in to the pressure from Kremlin

== Assassination attempt ==
In February 2004, four months after the publication of The Tales of a Kremlin Digger, Tregubova received a telephone call from a man claiming to be a Sheremetyevo International Airport employee. He told her that he had a package for her and asked for her delivery address. When she declined to provide it and asked from what telephone number he was calling, he hung up. On February 2, 2004, a bomb exploded outside the door to her Moscow apartment. No one was injured and officials claimed it to be "an act of hooliganism".

== Books ==
=== The Tales of a Kremlin Digger ===
Tregubova's best-selling book The Tales of a Kremlin Digger, published in October 2003, describes her experiences as a Kremlin correspondent and criticizes the customs of the Russian political elite. In particular, she described the involvement of Putin administration in state control of the media. The Tales of a Kremlin Digger annoyed the Kremlin. After the book appeared, Tregubova lost her job as a correspondent for Kommersant. In November 2003, an interview with her was pulled from broadcast by NTV, a channel once renowned for its critical reporting. The segment was yanked after it had already aired in Eastern time zones of the Russian Federation.

=== The Farewell of the Kremlin Digger ===
In her second book The Farewell of the Kremlin Digger (2004), Tregubova writes on the Kremlin's attempts to stop her first book from reaching the reader, and on the attempt on her life.

== Publications abroad ==
The Italian translation of The Tales of a Kremlin Digger (I mutanti del Cremlino) was brought out by Piemme Publishing in 2005, the German translation (Die Mutanten des Kremls) by Tropen Verlag in October 2006. Tregubova's books have not yet been translated into English.

Tregubova made the highlights in Germany in connection with the October 7, 2006 murder of the Russian journalist Anna Politkovskaya. On October 12, 2006, the German newspaper Zeit published Tregubova's open letter to German Chancellor Angela Merkel entitled "Silence Means Collaboration". Tregubova called upon Mrs. Merkel to speak out against the suppression of free press in Russia.

== Political asylum ==
On April 23, 2007, Trebugova filed an application for political asylum to Britain's Home Office, claiming her life was in "mortal danger" in Russia. On April 2, 2008, she told Reuters that the request had been granted.

== Bibliography ==
- Tregubova, Elena (2003). The Tales of a Kremlin Digger (Байки кремлевского диггера). Moscow: Ad Marginem. ISBN 978-5-93321-073-3.
- Tregubova, Elena (2004). Farewell of the Kremlin Digger (Прощание кремлёвского диггера). Moscow: Ad Marginem. ISBN 978-5-93321-095-5.

== See also ==
- Fatima Tlisova
- Yelena Maglevannaya
