= Yelena Antonova =

Yelena Antonova may refer to:

- Yelena Antonova (rower) (born 1952), Soviet Olympic rower
- Yelena Antonova (cyclist) (born 1971), Kazakhstani cyclist
- Yelena Antonova (synchronised swimmer) (born 1974), Russian Olympic synchronized swimmer
- Elena Antonova (skier) (born 1971), Kazakhstani Olympic cross-country skier
- Olena Antonova (born 1972), Ukrainian discus thrower
