= Kremlin pool =

Group of journalists covering the Russian President and Government

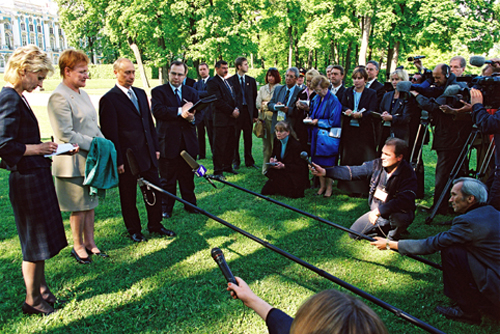
Russian journalists interviewing Vladimir Putin and Tarja Halonen, May 2002

The Kremlin pool (Russian: Кремлёвский пул), also President's pool (Russian: Президентский пул) are a group of Russian journalists accredited to regularly cover the activities of the President of Russia and the top Russian government.

Yelena Tregubova in her book The Tales of a Kremlin Digger spoke about the behind-the-scenes activities of the Kremlin pool of Boris Yeltsin and the early years of Vladimir Putin, attracting an angry reaction from the Kremlin.

== Notable journalists ==
- Andrey Kolesnikov (since 2001)
- Boris Grishchenko (late 1970s - 2004)
- Yelena Tregubova (1997-2001)
- Margarita Simonyan (2002-2005)
- Natalya Melikova (since 2002)
- Dmitry Glukhovsky (mid 2000s)

== See also ==
- White House press corps
