= Yelena Volkova =

Elena or Yelena Volkova may refer to:

- Yelena Volkova (volleyball) (born 1960), Soviet volleyball player and Olympic gold medalist
- Yelena Volkova (swimmer) (born 1968), Soviet swimmer and world champion
- Elena Volkova (painter) (1915–2013), Ukrainian painter
- Elena Volkova (basketball) (born 1983), Russian basketball player
