= Yelena Yefimova =

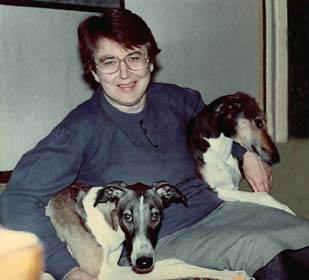
- Artist — kostorez Helen Ivanovna Yefimova
- Born: Еле́на Ива́новна Ефи́мова; 1948 (age 77–78); Moscow
- Education: Abramtsevo Artistic-Industrial College of Vasnetsova
- Known for: Open-work carving combined with low-relief engraving and color
- Patrons: Artists Union of Russia. Guild Masters — armourers

Yelena Ivanovna Yefimova (born 1948 in Russia) is a Russian artist and sculptor and a member of the National Association of Art crafts and Guild masters (armourers division). She has participated in six specialized weapons exhibitions and more than twenty other national and international exhibitions. Her works are in private and museum collections, including the collection of the State Historical and Cultural Museum-Reserve at the Moscow Kremlin.

She graduated in 1968 from Abramtsevo Artistic-Industrial College, Vasnetsova, in the department of art of carving on bone. From 1968 to 1974, she worked at the "Northern Souvenirs" Chukchi at workshop in the village Uelen. From 1976 to 1987 she was chief artist at the Research Institute of the Art Industry in the scientific laboratory of bones, skin, and fur. She has 35 years of experience in the fields of jewelry and decorative arts. She is a member of the National Club of the Hortaya borzaya breed of borzoi dogs.

== Exhibitions and awards ==
- 1985: All-Union Exhibition: Exhibition Complex "Youth Councils of the Country"
- 1986 – 1990: Zone exhibition "Artists of Moscow"
- 1987 – 1995: the fall-spring records of applied Moscow
- 1987: Exhibition: "The 70th Anniversary of Soviet Power" in Moscow Manege
- 1987: "Animal Russia"
- 1987: International Exhibition: Exhibition of decorative arts in Bulgaria. "Jewelry kit" (artists-jewelers)
- 1988: Exhibition of decorative arts in St. Petersburg
- 1988: "Artists—People" in the State Historical Museum in Moscow
- 1989: Exhibition—Competition of the Moscow area applied in the Podolsk (under the slogan "North"), I and II awards.
- 1990: "Contemporary Art Jewelry" (All-Union Museum of Decorative Art)
- 1994: All-Union Museum of Decorative and Applied Arts. Diploma for the best jewelry set of dice
- 1996: Leading master carver of ivory in the All-Union Museum of Decorative Art
- 1998: Moscow National Museum (August–September), competition "Gold and weapon skill in turn of the century Russia" – "Our Names", second place
- 1999: "Contemporary art weapons in Russia" and an exhibition of works at the Guild Ceremonial Hall of the Russian Culture Foundation
- 2000: Russia Blades. In the Armory Chamber of the State Historical and Cultural Museum, Reserve Moscow Kremlin
- 2001: "Blades Russia" in the Armory Chamber of the State Historical and Cultural Museum, Reserve Moscow Kremlin
- 2002: Weapons of Cultural Value" at the State Duma of the Russian Federation
- 2002: International exhibition titled "Nature, Hunting and Hunting Trophies"
- 2003: "Modern edged Art Weapons" in the Tula, Russia Tula State Museum of Weapons
- 2004: "Contemporary Art Weapons" at the Russian commemorative conference in Moscow on the 35th anniversary of the creation of the U.S.–Russia Joint Commission on POW/MIAs
- 2004: Biennale "Blades Russia" at the Exhibition Hall in the Kremlin Assumption Belfry
- 2006: "Contemporary Art Edged Weapons" in Tula State Museum of Weapons
- 2007: First International Festival of Contemporary Art "Traditions and Modernity" in Manezh (Moscow)

== Gallery ==
- 1998: Dagger and bobby pin "Snow Amazon"
- 1999: Knife on a stand "Raccoon"
- 1999: Knife on a stand "Jaguar"
- 2000: Knife "Encounter"
- 2001: Knife "Life is Short. Art is Forever"
- 2002: Sculpture song "Tenderness"
- 2003: Knife desk "Walrus"
- 2003: Desktop composition "Life For Life"
- 2004: Desktop composition "My"
- 2006: Cabinet knife "Raccoon"
- 2006: Desktop composition "Tiger" and "Boar" of the author's series "Encounter"
- 2006: Desktop composition "Bear" and walruses" of the author's series "Encounter"
- 2006: Desktop composition "Russian Rugby"
- 2008: Desktop song "Sovyata"
- 2008: Desktop composition "The Bear and Lahtak"

== Galleries and museums ==
- The artist's works were acquired by leading museums: State Historical Museum, Historical and Architectural Museum of Art New Jerusalem, and the Sergiev Posad State Historical-Artistic Museum
- Art Fund Union of Artists
