= Yelena Lapushkina =

Mayor of Samara, Russia

- Елена Лапушкина
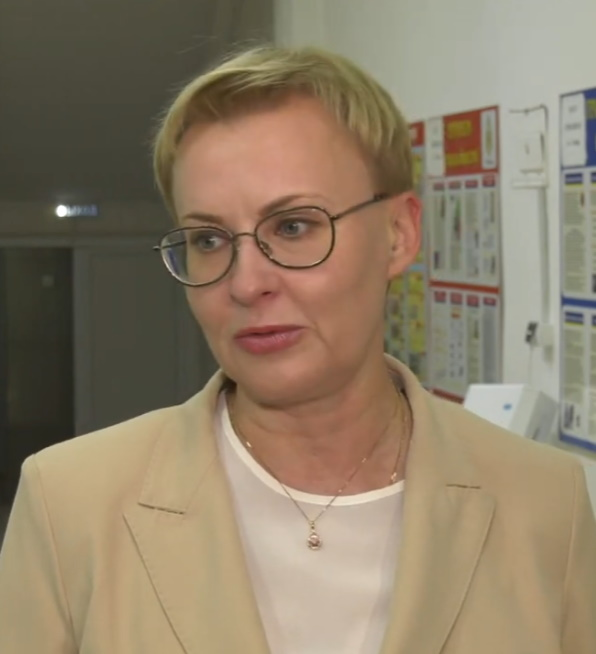
- Lapushkina in 2021

Head of Samara Urban Okrug
- Incumbent
- Assumed office 26 December 2017
- Preceded by: Vladimir Vasilyenko (acting)

Head of Administration of Zheleznodorozhny District of Samara Urban Okrug
- In office June 2013 – 26 December 2017
- Preceded by: Aleksey Savin
- Succeeded by: Vadim Tyunin

Personal details
- Born: Yelena Vlamdimirovna Lapushkina; 17 July 1968 (age 57) Samara, Soviet Union

Yelena Vladimirovna Lapushkina (Russian: Елена Владимировна Лапушкина; born on 17 July 1968) is a Russian politician serving as the head of Samara since 26 December 2017. From 2013 to 2017, she was the head of the administration of the Zheleznodorozhny district of the city of Samara.

== Biography ==
Yelena Lapushkina was born on 17 July 1968 in the city of Kuibyshev (present-day Samara). She graduated from the Kuibyshev Polytechnic Institute. At the institute, she met the future governor of the Samara Oblast, Dmitry Azarov.

From 1991 to 1992, she was an engineer-technologist of the electroplating shop of the Kuibyshev machine-building production association Metalist.

From 1992 to 2000, she was the Chairman of the Committee for Youth Affairs of the Administration of the Zheleznodorozhny District.

From 2000 to 2007, she was the Head of the Department of Organizational Work of the Zheleznodorozhny District.

From 2007 to 2013, she was the Deputy Head of Administration of the Zheleznodorozhny District.

In June 2013, the head of Samara, Azarov, appointed Lapushkina as the head of the administration of the Zheleznodorozhny district.

On 26 December 2017, following the results of the competition committee of the Duma of the city district of Samara, on the recommendation of Governor Azarov, Lapushkina was elected the Head of the city district of Samara.

In 2018, a case was initiated against the official on grounds of violating antitrust laws. According to Gazbank, on the basis of Article 68 of the Federal Law-131, Lapushkina, as the head of the city, had the right to adopt the Decree "On the establishment of a municipal bank by entering the city administration into the shareholders of Gazbank, however, the city administration and the city duma to revoke the license banks did not respond.

On 4 April 2019, she allowed the liquidation of the municipal passenger motor transport enterprise MP Passazhiravtotrans, which carries out urban passenger transportation in Samara, which, under the rule of the city of Oleg Fursov, accumulated debts. The passenger services market was transferred to a private company Samara Auto Gas LLC (SAG).

On 17 April 2019, at the 14th congress, she was elected chairman of the Association "Council of Municipalities of the Samara Region".

== Status and income ==
According to income data, in 2016 Lapushkina earned 1.8 million rubles. She also owns an apartment of just over 30 square meters. Information about the income of the spouse and children is not indicated in the declaration.

For 2019, the salary of the Head of the Samara City District is 3.1 million rubles a year and 258 thousand rubles a month. This is 1 million rubles less than the income of the head of Togliatti Sergey Antashev.

In 2021, Elena Lapushkina's official income amounted to 2.7 million rubles, which is 40 thousand rubles more than a year earlier.
