= Yelena Afanasyeva =

Yelena Afanasyeva may refer to:

- Yelena Afanasyeva (athlete) (born 1967), Russian track and field athlete
- Yelena Afanasyeva (politician) (born 1975), Russian politician
