= Natalya Timakova =

Russian journalist (born 1975)

- Наталья Тимакова
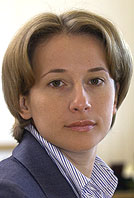
- Timakova in 2004

Kremlin Press Secretary
- In office 13 May 2008 – 21 May 2012
- President: Dmitry Medvedev
- Preceded by: Alexey Gromov
- Succeeded by: Dmitry Peskov

Press Secretary of the Prime Minister of Russia
- In office 22 May 2012 – 17 September 2018
- Prime Minister: Dmitry Medvedev
- Preceded by: Dmitry Peskov
- Succeeded by: Oleg Osipov

Personal details
- Born: Natalya Aleksandrovna Timakova; 12 April 1975 (age 51) Alma Ata, Kazakh SSR, Soviet Union (now Almaty, Kazakhstan)
- Spouse: Alexander Budberg

Natalya Aleksandrovna Timakova (Russian: Наталья Александровна Тимакова; born 12 April 1975) is a Russian journalist. From 2008 to 2018, she was the press secretary of Russian politician Dmitry Medvedev.

She has the federal state civilian service rank of 1st class Active State Councillor of the Russian Federation.

== Early life and education ==
Timakova was born in Alma Ata in the Kazakh SSR (now Almaty, Kazakhstan) on 12 April 1975. She graduated from the Faculty of Philosophy at Moscow State University in 1998.

== Journalistic career ==
Timakova began working as a journalist in 1995 whilst studying at Moscow State, where she was a political journalist for Moskovsky Komsomolets. In 1996, Timakova was part of the Presidential pool of journalists and she covered the election campaign of first Russian president Boris Yeltsin for the 1996 presidential election. In 1997, Timakova was a reporter and then senior political correspondent at Kommersant, and worked for the publishing house until 1999. In 1999, Timakova was the political correspondent for Interfax.

== Government service ==
In 1999, Timakova was appointed as deputy head of the Government Information Department of the Russian government, until she was appointed in 2000 as the deputy head of the Presidential Press and Information Office, and from 2001 as first deputy head of the same office. On 4 November 2002, she was appointed by Russian president Vladimir Putin as first deputy press secretary for the president and head of the Presidential Press and Information Office.

On 13 May 2008, Timakova was appointed by new president Dmitry Medvedev to the post of press secretary to the Russian president. Timakova was a core member of Medvedev's presidential administration, and she was deemed by the Agency for Political and Economic Communications in 2011 to be the 44th most powerful figure, and to be the third most powerful female, in Russian politics, after Tatyana Golikova and Elvira Nabiullina.

On 22 May 2012, she was appointed as the Spokesman of the Prime Minister.

After leaving government service, she was appointed as Deputy Chairman of the VEB.RF state development corporation. In November 2021, Timakova was on the Expert Council of the Agency for Strategic Initiatives.

== Personal life ==
She is married to businessman Alexander Budberg, who is the chairman of the executive committee of the Bolshoi Ballet's board of trustees.

== Awards ==
On 29 January 2009, South Ossetian president Eduard Kokoity signed an ukaz conferring on Timakova the Order of Friendship for "assistance in objective reporting of the events around South Ossetia in 2008".

== Bibliography ==
In 2000, Timakova co-wrote First Person: Conversations with Vladimir Putin with Andrey Kolesnikov and Nataliya Gevorkyan.

Political offices
Preceded by Alexey Gromov	Kremlin Press Secretary; 13 May 2008-21 May 2012	Succeeded by Dmitry Peskov
