= Yelena Shevchenko =

Yelena Shevchenko or Elena Shevchenko may refer to:

- Yelena Shevchenko (gymnast)
- Yelena Shevchenko (actress)
- Elena V. Shevchenko, Belarusian-American nanoscientist
