= Yelena Maglevannaya =

Russian journalist

Yelena Maglevannaya (Russian: Елена Маглеванная, born 15 December 1981) is a Russian free-lance journalist for the newspaper Svobodnoye Slovo, Free Speech, in Volgograd. She requested a political asylum in Finland in May 2009. Maglevannaya has focused on cases of persecution against Chechens.

Maglevannaya published an article of a Chechen Zubayr Zubayraev (Russian: Зубайр Зубайраев), detained in Volgograd since 2007, in Civitas.ru, Svobodnoye Slovo and later on the web page of the Islamic Committee of Russia. The article criticized the conditions and ill-treatments in prisons. On 18 February 2009, the administration of Volgograd set a suit against Maglevannaya for “honour and business reputation protection”, accusing her of spreading disinformation on torture of Mr. Zubayraev. Court of Volgograd ruled that Maglevannaya had spread false information, and ordered to pay 200,000 rubles (about 4,600 euros) as a compensation for moral damage to the administration of Volgograd prison colony LIU-15.

Also, Maglevannaya has received a death threat on the web site of a nationalist group Russian Nationwide Union. Maglevannaya claims that she was threatened to be sent to a mental hospital if she continued to write.

In Finland, Maglevannaya has been supported by members of the "Finnish-Russian Civic Forum" (Finrosforum). In May 2009, Maglevannaya participated in a forum on human rights by Finrosforum in Helsinki and requested for a political asylum a few days later. In 2010, she was granted political asylum in Finland.

== See also ==
- Yelena Tregubova
- Fatima Tlisova
