= List of ambassadors of Russia to Jordan =

Ambassador of the Russian Federation to the Hashemite Kingdom of Jordan
- Emblem of the Russian Foreign Ministry
- Incumbent; Gleb Desyatnikov since 28 December 2018
- Ministry of Foreign Affairs; Embassy of Russia in Amman
- Reports to: Minister of Foreign Affairs
- Seat: Amman
- Appointer: President of Russia
- Term length: At the pleasure of the president
- Website: Embassy of Russia in Jordan

The ambassador extraordinary and plenipotentiary of the Russian Federation to the Hashemite Kingdom of Jordan is the official representative of the president and the government of the Russian Federation to the king and the government of Jordan.

The ambassador and his staff work at large in the Embassy of Russia in Amman. The post of Russian ambassador to Jordan is currently held by Gleb Desyatnikov, incumbent since 28 December 2018.

== History of diplomatic relations ==
Diplomatic relations between the Soviet Union and Jordan were established on 20 August 1963. Pyotr Slyusarenko was appointed ambassador on 30 January 1964. With the dissolution of the Soviet Union in 1991, the government of Jordan recognized the Russian Federation as its successor. The Soviet ambassador, Yuri Gryadunov, continued as representative of the Russian Federation until 1992.

== List of representatives (1964–present) ==
=== Soviet Union to Jordan (1964–1991) ===
Name	Title	Appointment	Termination	Notes
Pyotr Slyusarenko	Ambassador	30 January 1964	11 June 1968	
Anatoly Anisimov	Ambassador	11 June 1968	21 November 1972	
Aleksey Voronin	Ambassador	21 November 1972	8 June 1978	
Rafiq Nishonov	Ambassador	8 June 1978	6 March 1985	
Aleksandr Zinchuk	Ambassador	6 March 1985	7 February 1990	
Yuri Gryadunov	Ambassador	7 February 1990	25 December 1991	

=== Russian Federation to Jordan (1991–present) ===
Name	Title	Appointment	Termination	Notes
Yuri Gryadunov	Ambassador	25 December 1991	22 April 1992	
Aleksandr Saltanov	Ambassador	31 December 1992	25 January 1999	
Aleksandr Ivanov-Galitsin	Ambassador	24 May 1999	29 March 2002	
Aleksandr Shein	Ambassador	29 March 2002	16 January 2006	
Aleksandr Kalugin	Ambassador	16 January 2006	13 December 2013	
Boris Bolotin	Ambassador	13 December 2013	28 December 2018	
Gleb Desyatnikov	Ambassador	28 December 2018		
