= Yelena Usievich =

Russian writer and literary critic (1893-1968)

- Born: Yelena Feliksovna Kon; March 4, 1893; Yakutsk, Russian Empire
- Died: January 15, 1968; Moscow, Soviet Union
- Education: Institute of Red Professors
- Occupations: Literary critic, editor
- Spouse(s): Grigory A. Usievich (m. 1917, d. 1920); Alexander Taxer
- Children: One son (deceased 1934), Iskra-Marina Taxer
- Writing career
- Language: Russian
- Period: 20th century

Yelena Feliksovna Usievich (4 March 1893, Yakutsk, Russian Empire – 15 January 1968, Moscow, Soviet Union) was a Soviet and Russian literary critic and editor of Literaturnyi kritik.

== Life ==
Yelena Usievich was the daughter of the Polish revolutionary Feliks Kon, Platon Kerzhentsev's predecessor as head of the All Union Radio Committee, and Khristiana Grinberg. She was born in Siberia in 1893. In April 1917 she and her first husband, Grigory A. Usievich, returned to Russia from Swiss exile in Lenin's 'sealed train'. They had a son together, who died aged 17 in 1934, and Grigory himself died aged twenty-seven in the Russian Civil War. Yelena Usievich worked in the Cheka, under Yuri Larin at the Economic Council, and at the Crimean Theater Repertory Censorship Committee. With her second husband Alexander Taxer, a Far Eastern Bolshevik who became second secretary of the Crimean Party Committee, she had a daughter, Iskra-Marina, in 1926. Alexander Taxer died in 1931. In 1932 Yelena graduated from the Institute of Red Professors.

Yelena Usievich edited the journal Literaturnyi kritik, founded in 1933. In May 1937 she published a controversial article there, 'On Political Poetry', arguing that poetry needed to be "sincere" and encompass the full range of human feelings, rather than be simplistic and "impersonal" translations of political platforms into verse. As Usievich put it, "in Mayakovsky's cries about love unrequited there was more social content than in many lamentations on political themes written by the minor epigones of popular poetry." In 1939 she made similar arguments defending the lyric poetry of Stepan Shchipachev.
