= Kremlin Press Secretary =

Russian government official

Press-Secretary of President of the Russian Federation Пресс-Секретарь Президента Российской Федерации
- Logo of the Russian president

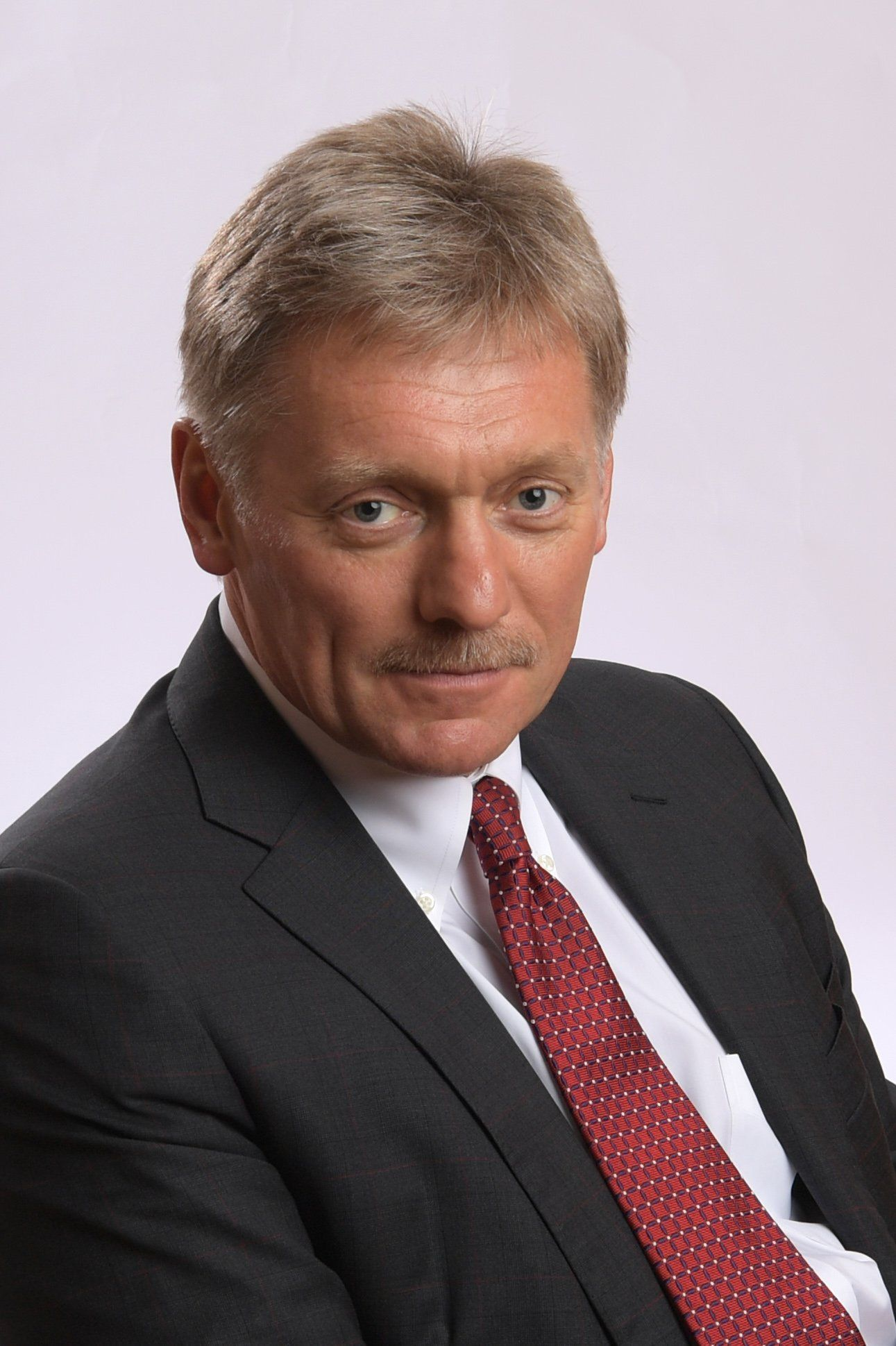
- Incumbent; Dmitry Peskov since 22 May 2012
- Residence: Moscow Kremlin
- Appointer: The president
- Inaugural holder: Pavel Voshchanov
- Formation: 20 July 1991
- Website: http://kremlin.ru/ (in Russian)

The Kremlin press secretary or officially press secretary of the president of the Russian Federation (Russian: Пресс-Секретарь Президента Российской Федерации) is a senior official in the Presidential Administration of Russia whose primary responsibility is to act as spokesperson for the Russian Federation government administration, especially with regard to the president, senior executives, and policies.

== Responsibilities ==
The press secretary is responsible for collecting information about actions and events within the president's administration and around the world. The information includes items such as a summary of the president's schedule, whom the president has seen or had communication with, and the official position of the administration on the news. The press secretary interacts with the media, and deals with the Kremlin pool.

== List of press secretaries ==
#	Portrait	Name	Term of office	Duration	President
1		Pavel Voshchanov	20 July 1991 — 14 May 1992	299 days	Boris Yeltsin
2		Vyacheslav Kostikov	14 May 1992 — 14 March 1995	1 year, 304 days	Boris Yeltsin
3		Sergey Medvedev	15 March 1995 — 13 August 1996	1 year, 151 days	Boris Yeltsin
4		Sergey Yastrzhembsky	13 August 1996 — 12 September 1998	2 years, 30 days	Boris Yeltsin
5		Dmitry Yakushkin	15 September 1998 — 3 January 2000	1 year, 110 days	Boris Yeltsin
6		Alexey Gromov	4 January 2000 — 12 May 2008	8 years, 129 days	Vladimir Putin
7		Natalya Timakova	13 May 2008 — 21 May 2012	4 years, 8 days	Dmitry Medvedev
8		Dmitry Peskov	22 May 2012 — Present	14 years, 108 days	Vladimir Putin

== See also ==
- People's Commissariat for Posts and Telegraphs of the RSFSR
- Ministry of Communications (Soviet Union)
- Ministry of Foreign Affairs (Russia)
- Kremlin Chief of Staff
