= Alexey Gromov =

Russian politician (born 1960)

- Алексей Громов
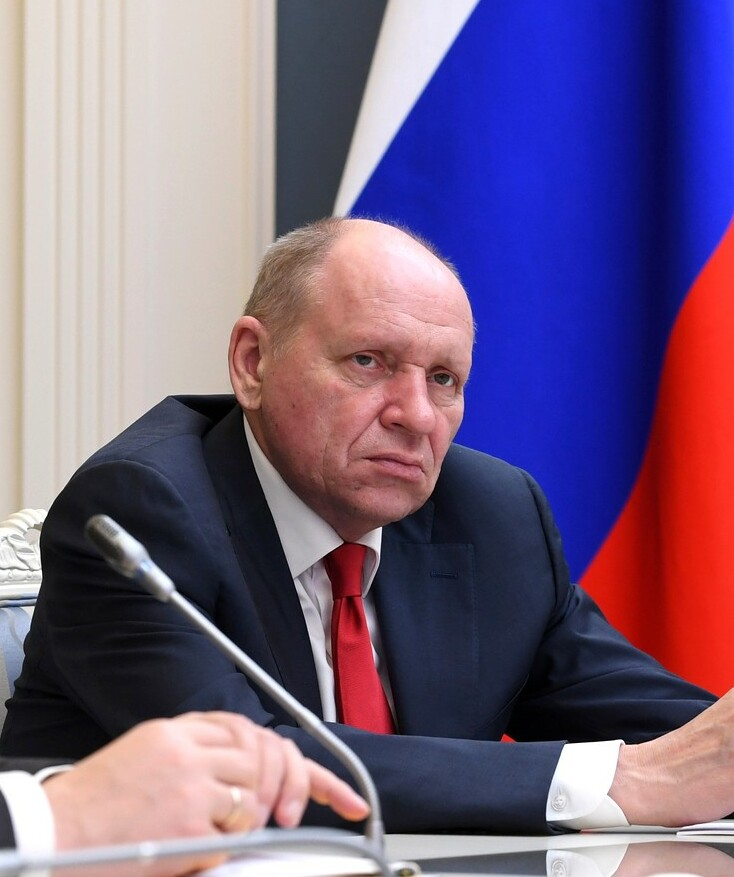
- Gromov in 2020

First Deputy Kremlin Chief of Staff
- Incumbent
- Assumed office 21 May 2012 Serving with Sergey Kiriyenko

Deputy Kremlin Chief of Staff
- In office 12 May 2008 – 21 May 2012
- President: Dmitry Medvedev; Vladimir Putin
- Succeeded by: Anton Vaino

Kremlin Press Secretary
- In office 4 January 2000 – 12 May 2008
- President: Vladimir Putin
- Preceded by: Dmitry Yakushkin
- Succeeded by: Natalya Timakova

Personal details
- Born: 31 May 1960 (age 66) Zagorsk, Russian SFSR, Soviet Union
- Education: Moscow State University

Alexey Alexeyevich Gromov (Russian: Алексей Алексеевич Громов; born 31 May 1960) is a Russian politician. He is First Deputy Chief of Staff of the Presidential Administration of Russia. He has the federal state civilian service rank of 1st class Active State Councillor of the Russian Federation. He has been referred to as "Vladimir Putin's media puppetmaster".

== Biography ==
Gromov was born in 1960 in Zagorsk, Moscow Oblast, Soviet Union. He studied history at Moscow State University, specialising in Southern and Western Slavs and received his degree in history in 1982. For many years after his graduation, he worked for the Soviet and then the Russian government in their respective Ministries of Foreign Affairs. He served the governments with appointments in Czechoslovakia, Russia, and Slovakia. Since 1996, he has worked directly for the president, first in the Press Office, then as Press Attache, and, since 2008, after Natalya Timakova became the press secretary under Dmitry Medvedev, as Deputy Chief of Staff.

=== Sanctions ===
On March 20, 2014, the Office of Foreign Assets Control (OFAC) published that Gromov and 19 other men have been added to the Specially Designated Nationals List (SDN).

On May 12, 2014, Gromov was added to the European Union sanctions list due to his role in the annexation of Crimea by the Russian Federation. He is barred from entering the EU countries, and his assets in the EU have to be frozen.

He was sanctioned by the UK government in 2014 in relation to the Russo-Ukrainian War.

== Personal life ==
Gromov speaks fluent Czech, Slovak and English. He is married and they have two sons, Alexey and Danila.

Political offices
Preceded by Dmitry Yakushkin	Kremlin Press Secretary; 4 January 2000-12 May 2008	Succeeded by Natalya Timakova

== Licence ==
This article incorporates material from the website of the President of Russia and is used under the Creative Commons and Attribution 4.0 International , 8 April 2015 - on Attribution 3.0 Unported Licence.
