= Pakistan–Soviet Union relations =

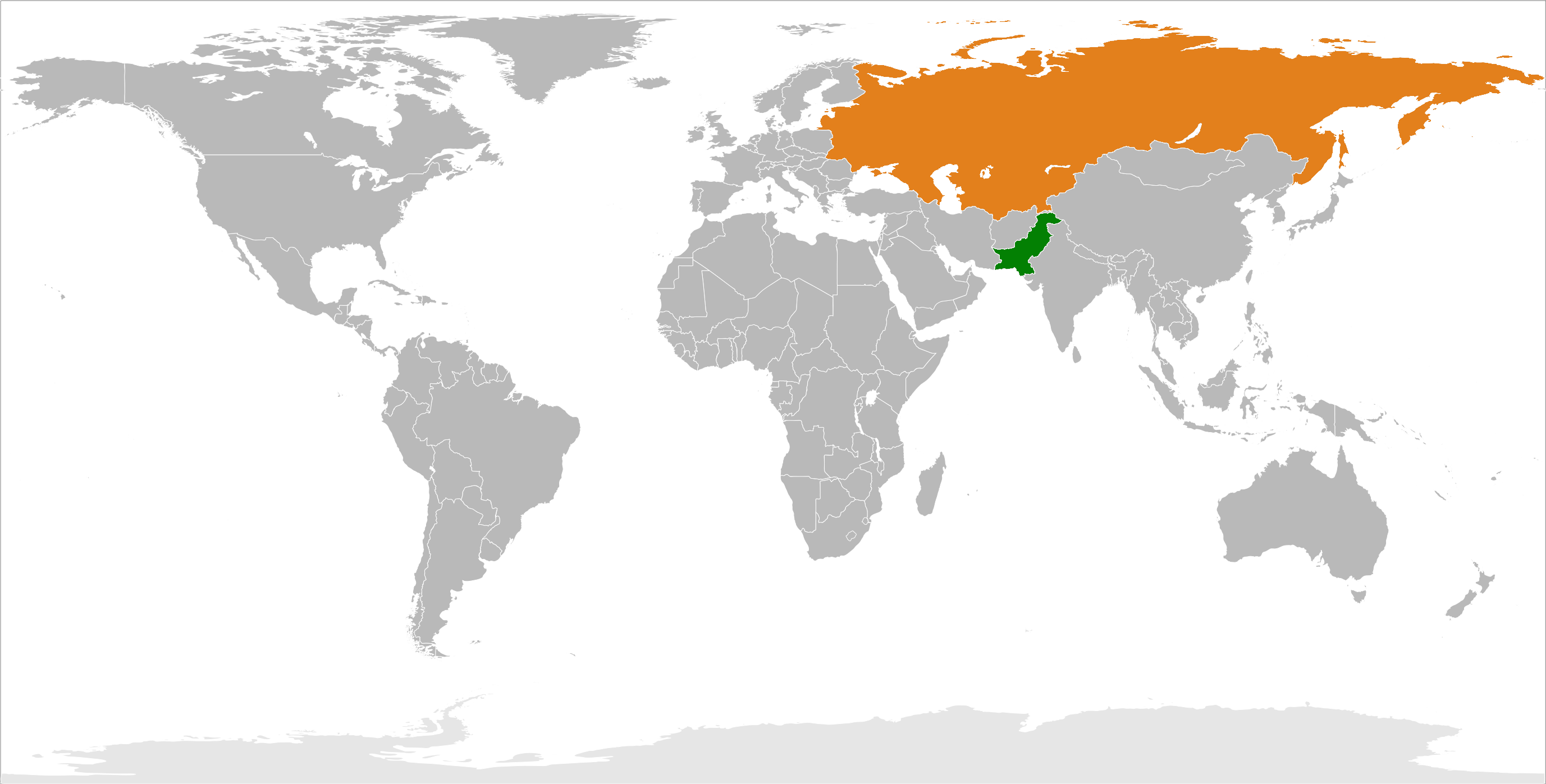

- Pakistan: Soviet Union

Diplomatic mission
- Embassy of the Soviet Union, Islamabad: Embassy of Pakistan, Moscow

Envoy
- Ambassador: Shuaib Qureshi (first) Abdul Sattar (last or second-last): Ambassador: Ivan Bakulin (first); Victor Yakunin (last)

Pakistan and the Soviet Union had complex and tense relations. During the Cold War (1947–1991), Pakistan was a part of Western Bloc of the First World and an ally of the United States, which was opposed to the Soviet-led Eastern Bloc of the Second World.

Less than a year after Pakistan gained independence, in May 1948, both countries established relations and Soviet premier Joseph Stalin, in 1949, invited Pakistani prime minister Liaquat Ali Khan to visit Moscow, though Khan instead visited the United States in May 1950. Following Khan's assassination in 1951, relations remained strained as Pakistan joined the anti-communist alliances SEATO in 1954 and CENTO in 1955. In the aftermath of the 1958 Pakistani military coup, President Ayub Khan significantly improved relations with the United States. The 1960 U-2 incident was a flashpoint in Pakistan–Soviet relations, after which Soviet leader Nikita Khrushchev threatened to drop a nuclear bomb on Peshawar. After Khrushchev's removal, Khan visited Moscow and negotiated peace with Soviet premier Alexei Kosygin. As a result, the Soviets remained neutral during the Second India–Pakistan War in 1965.

Khan's successor Yahya Khan, a pro-American president, presided over the Bangladesh Liberation War and the India–Pakistani War of 1971. The Soviets aided the Bengali nationalists and India against Pakistan. After the Pakistani defeat, leadership passed to the socialist Zulfikar Ali Bhutto, who normalized relations with the Soviets. This resulted in Soviet assistance for construction of Pakistan Steel Mills and Guddu Thermal Power Station, and Pakistan's departure from SEATO and CENTO. The brief détente came to an end after the 1977 military coup by Muhammad Zia-ul-Haq. During the Soviet–Afghan War, Zia backed the Afghan mujahideen, funded by the Inter-Services Intelligence (ISI) and the Pakistan Army, which fought a proxy war against the Soviet Army in Afghanistan. Meanwhile, in 1988, Zia was killed in an aircraft crash.

After Soviet withdrawal from Afghanistan in 1989, the Soviets offered Pakistan to install a commercial nuclear power plant, though Pakistan's prime ministers Benazir Bhutto and later Nawaz Sharif showed little interest in aging Soviet technology. In December 1991, the Soviet Union was dissolved and succeeded by the Russian Federation. Since then, Pakistan–Russia relations have been cooperative and friendly.

== History ==
=== Democratic governments (1947–1958) ===
The Pakistan Movement (1940–1947) believed in the two-nation theory and advocated for the division of British India into a Muslim-majority Pakistan and Hindu-majority India. Accordingly, Pakistan achieved independence from the United Kingdom on 14 August 1947. Soviet dictator Joseph Stalin and officials at Moscow did not send any congratulatory message to Muhammad Ali Jinnah, the founder and governor-general of Pakistan. During the First Kashmir War (1947–1948) against India, the Soviet Union remained neutral and gave a non-committal attitude. The Kashmir conflict was moved to the United Nations Security Council to settle the dispute between India and Pakistan. The status quo was more acceptable to India, not by Pakistan, and initially influenced Moscow to vote in favor of India in 1947.

During 1947–1953, Pakistan was a member of Non-Aligned Movement (NAM). It faced challenges of economic nature, foreign policy, internal unrest and constitutional crises. Initially, Pakistan waited to see if any nation was willing to help the country to re-build its massive military and economic aid, and leading bureaucrat at this time, Sir Firoz Ali Khan had revealed that:

If the Hindus give [us freedom and] Pakistan, then the Hindus are her best friends. If the British give it to her then the Brits are our best friends. If neither will give us the freedom..... Then Russia is our best friend....

— Firoze Ali Khan, 1946, source

In April 1948, at the UN Economic and Social Commission for Asia and Far East, Pakistan's foreign officers of Pakistan announced that "she (Pakistan) would accept aid from any source", but the Soviets did not respond to that request. In 1948, Prime Minister Ali Khan made several attempts to the Soviet Union to establish relations, but the Soviets remained quiet. In April 1948, Foreign minister Sir Zafarullah Khan held talks with Deputy Foreign minister Andrei Gromyko, subjecting the diplomatic relation. During this time, Pakistan saw relations with the Soviet Union from the prism of relations with India just as these days it sees ties with the United States.

There are important divergences of outlook between Pakistan, with its Islamic background, and the Soviet Union with its background of Marxism which is atheistic.... Pakistan had noticed the subservience which was forced upon the allies of the Soviet Union... Furthermore, there was the question whether Russia could supply the aid, both material and technical, which Pakistan so urgently needed...

— Pakistan Institute of International Affairs, 1950,

However, the policy was changed after Soviet Union witnessed two events particularly forcing them to respond to Pakistan when India decided to remain within the Commonwealth Nations, it was a clear sign that India was leaning towards the Western countries under the U.S. auspices. The second event was the Indian premier Jawaharlal Nehru's announcement to pay the state visit to the United States on May 7, 1949. To a reaction, Soviet Union extended an invitation to Prime Minister, Liaquat Ali Khan, in 1949 to visit Moscow, becoming the first Prime Minister from the Commonwealth of Nations to visit the communist country, but Soviet Union herself did not materialized the dates or the plans. Instead, Prime Minister Ali Khan went onto paid a state visit to United States, taking the largest diplomatic and military convey with him, a clear rebuff to Soviet Union. According to studies completed by Pakistan Institute of International Affairs (PIIA), the real motives, goals and objectives, were to an economic and technical assistance. "There are important divergences of outlook between Pakistan, with its Islamic background, and the Soviet Union with its background of Marxism which is atheistic. ... Pakistan had noticed the subservience which was forced upon the allies of the Soviet Union. ... Furthermore, there was the question whether Russia could supply the aid, both material and technical, which Pakistan so urgently needed..." PIIA noted. The relations suffered setback when members of Communist Party led by communist Faiz Ahmad Faiz, sponsored by Major-General Akbar Khan, hatched a coup d'état against Prime Minister Liaquat Ali Khan in 1950 (See Rawalpindi conspiracy case). Soon, three years after, Prime Minister Liaqat Ali Khan was assassinated

Pakistan felt deceived because the U.S. had kept her in the dark about such clandestine spy operations launched from Pakistan’s territory

— General K.M. Arif, Chief of Army Staff.,

while campaigning for his electoral term. During 1954–58, the relations were strained and hostility against each other as time passes. In 1954, Pakistan became a member of SEATO and METO in 1955, which Soviet Union did not welcome, overtly opting the Pro-Indian policy and regarding the Kashmir as part of India. As a result of 1954–55 elections, Prime Minister Huseyn Suhrawardy, a left-wing Prime Minister, made deliberate attempts to improve relations. On March–April 1954, a delegation of the Soviet cultural troupe toured Pakistan and a festival of the Soviet films was held in Karachi. To reciprocate this, the Pakistan Government also sent a delegation to study the Soviet industrial and agricultural development In 1956, Soviet premier Nikolai Bulganin offered technical and scientific assistance to Prime Minister Suhrawardy for the peaceful uses of nuclear energy, offering Soviet contribution after Suhrawardy submitted the plan to established the nuclear power against India. In 1958, Soviet Union agreed to give Pakistan aid in agriculture, economic, science, control of pest, flood control, desalination, soil erosion and technical assistance to Pakistan. In 1958, Pakistan and Soviet Union finally established an oil consortium, Pakistan Oilfields, and expressing interests in establishing the country's first steel mills.

=== Military presidencies (1958–1971) ===
In July 1957, Prime Minister Suhrawardy approved the leasing of the secret ISI installation, Peshawar Air Station, to CIA.

Do not play with Fire!, Gentlemen. We have "Red marked" Peshawar on the map of Pakistan

— Nikita Khrushchev, reaction on 1960 U-2 incident, source

After commencing the military coup d'état against President Iskander Mirza, Army Commander Ayub Khan visited the United States, further enhancing relations with the U.S. while at same time, trying establishing link with Soviet Union through Zulfikar Ali Bhutto.

The U-2 incident worsened relations between the Soviet Union and Pakistan. General Khalid Mahmud Arif, former chief of army staff, wrote of the incident that, "Pakistan felt deceived because the U.S. had kept her in the dark about such clandestine spy operations launched from Pakistan’s territory".

The Soviet Union had been long associated with Pakistan to help built its technical industries and consortium since late 1950s. In 1950, Soviet Union and Pakistan established the multibillion-dollar worth Pakistan Oilfields (it was known as Pakistan-Soviet Oil Fields). In 1969, the Pakistan Government employed "V/o Tyaz Promexport", a USSR technical consortium, for vertically integrated steel mills in Karachi, Sindh Province. In 1971, Zulfikar Ali Bhutto succeeded to bring full-scale Soviet investment in this project, and laid the foundations of the steel mills in 1972 with the help of Soviet Union.

The Soviet Union paid back its revenge on Indo-Pakistani war of 1965, emerged as the biggest supplier of military hardware to India. India on other hand, distanced from the Western countries, developed close relations with the Soviet Union. Soviet Union and India used the diplomacy, convincing the U.S. and Western powers to keep a ban on Pakistan's military and hardware. After the 1965 war, the arms race between India and Pakistan became even more asymmetric and India was outdistancing Pakistan by far. However, in 1968, Soviet Union and Pakistan made an arms deal.

In 1965, Zulfikar Ali Bhutto first paid a state visit to Moscow and brought a great achievement to resolve territorial and political difference between the two countries. On April 3, 1965, President Ayub Khan paid a first ever state visit to Moscow in a view to established a strong cultural relations with the people of the USSR. Publicly, President Ayub Khan thanked Soviet Premier Alexei Kosygin, and quoted:"Soviet Union is our next door neighbor with which Pakistan had close friendly connections in the past." During this visit, Zulfikar Ali Bhutto and Andrei Gromyko signed the agreements in the field of trade, economic cooperation and cultural exchange.

Soviet Union is our next door neighbor with which Pakistan had close friendly connections in the past.....

— Field Marshal Ayub Khan, Cited source

As the result of President Khan's visit to the Soviet Union, both countries concluded another agreement for cultural exchanges that was signed on 5 June 1965. This agreement was on the basis of exchange the academicians, scholars, scientists, artists, sportsmen, and also the exchange of music records, radio and television programs. During the signing ceremony of this cultural agreement, S.K. Romonovsky, the Soviet Cultural Minister quoted that "many pacts between two countries would help towards better understanding among the people of Pakistan and the USSR." Finally, on 17 April 1968, Premier Kosygin paid a visit to Pakistan and was welcomed by President Ayub and the Pakistan's civil society members with cordial manner. During his visit Alexi Kosygin said: "that relations between Pakistan and the Soviet Union are very good indeed and we should want more and more to strengthen and better them."

The Soviet Premier's visit in April 1968 was the first of its kind state visit and was of outstanding significance. Kosygin agreed to the granting of aid for a steel mill, a nuclear power plant and also economic aid on a broad range of development projects. Quite importantly, the first Soviet-Pakistan arms deal was made in 1968, which caused protests from India. During the time of Kosygin's reception, renowned poet Hafeez Jullundhri, sang out a poem, comparing Kosygin's visit to the coming of the dawn, which would bring self-determination and justice to the Kashmiri people. Kosygin enjoyed the amusing poetry, but remained silent on this issue. Alexei Kosygin said:

There were many forces in the world which did not want to see friendship growing between the Union of Soviet Socialist Republics (USSR) and Pakistan. Pakistan would achieve great success in all spheres under the leadership of President Muhammad Ayub Khan......

— Alexei Kosygin, Premier, 1968, source

==== Relations with West and East Pakistan ====
The Soviet Union had far better relations with East Pakistan (Now Bangladesh), and had strong ties with Communist Party after successfully staging the protest of Bengali language movement to give national recognition to the language as compare to Urdu in 1956 constitution. The Communist Party had ensure the complete elimination of Pakistan Muslim League once and for all, leading the collapse of central government of Pakistan Muslim League in the federal government. The tendency of democracy and the Anti-American sentiment was greater in East-Pakistan, which highly benefited the Soviet Union in 1971. When the mutual defence treaty, following the arrival of military advisers from the MAAG group, which was announced in February 1954, there was a great outcry in East-Pakistan. Many demonstrations, led by communist party were held and the 162 newly elected members of East-Pakistan Parliament signed a statement, which denounced Pakistan's government for signing a military pact with United States.

In West-Pakistan, the Soviet relations had improved after the formation of leading democratic socialist Pakistan Peoples Party. The tendency of socialism was greater in West Pakistan, in contrast to East Pakistan were the tendency of communism was at its height. After the 1965 war, Soviet relations with socialist mass, Awami National Party, Pakistan People's Party, and the Pakistan Socialist Party, impulsively improved. In 1972, the West-Pakistan Parliament passed the resolution which called for establishing ties with Soviet Union. During the 1980s when the purged took place under the Zia regime, the socialist members escaped to the Soviet Union through Afghanistan, seeking the political asylum there.

==== Role in Indo–Pakistani War of 1971 ====
The Soviet Union played a decisive role in the Indo-Pakistani War of 1971, first signing the Indo-Soviet Treaty of Friendship and Cooperation. The Soviet Union sympathized with the Bangladeshis, and supported the Indian Army and Mukti Bahini during the war, recognizing that the independence of Bangladesh would weaken the position of its rivals – the United States, Saudi Arabia, and China.

On 6 December and 13 December 1971, the Soviet Navy dispatched two groups of cruisers and destroyers and a nuclear submarine armed with nuclear missiles from Vladivostok; they trailed U.S. Task Force 74 into the Indian Ocean from 18 December 1971 until 7 January 1972. The Soviets also had a nuclear submarine to help ward off the threat posed to India by USS Enterprise task force in the Indian Ocean. The Soviet Navy's presence was threatening for Pakistan, with the Soviet nuclear submarines' K-320 and Charlie, movements were picked up by the Pakistan Navy's submarines. The Pakistan Navy's submarines Ghazi, Hangor, and Mangor had sent solid evidence of Soviet Navy's covert involvement helping the Indian Navy, and Soviet Navy's own secret operations against the Pakistan Navy. Pakistan Navy avoided aggressive contacts with the Soviet Navy due to possible nuclear retaliation by Soviet nuclear submarines in Karachi. In 2012, at an official press release in the Russian Consulate-General Karachi, the Russian ambassador remarked that the former Soviet stance against Pakistan in 1971 did "somewhat embarrassed our relations".

==== Democratic government (1971–1977) ====
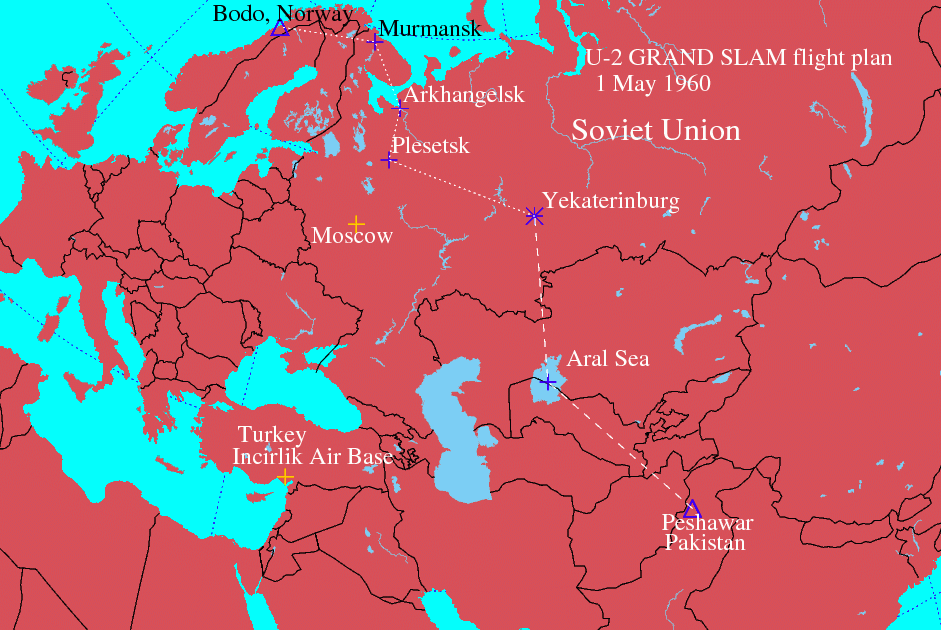
Map showing distance from Peshawar to Moscow.

The democratic socialist alliance led by then-Prime Minister Zulfikar Ali Bhutto made an effort to improve relations with the Soviet Union, and for the first time in Pakistani history, the Soviet Union's ties with Pakistan began to warm and relations were quickly improved. Reviving his foreign policy, Bhutto relieved Pakistan from SEATO and CENTO, breaking off the relations with the United States under President Jimmy Carter. In 1974, Bhutto paid a tiring and lengthy state visit to Soviet Union, becoming the first Prime Minister since the independence of Pakistan in 1947. Bhutto and his delegation was met with great jubilation, a warm-heated celebration took place after Bhutto was received by Alexei Kosygin in Moscow. The honorary guard of honor was bestowed by the Soviet Armed Forces, and strong interaction was made during Bhutto's democratic era. Bhutto also met with Leonid Brezhnev where Pakistan reached agreements with Soviet Union on mutual trust, cooperation, technical assistance, and friendship.

While there, Bhutto succeeded to convince the Soviet Union to establish the integrated steel mills, which prompted the Soviet Union to provide funds for the billion dollar project. Prime Minister Bhutto made a deliberate attempt to warm relations with Russia as he was trying to improve relations with the Communist bloc. Bhutto sought to develop and alleviate the Soviet-Pak Relations, as the Soviet Union established Pakistan Steel Mills in 1972. The foundation stone for this gigantic project was laid on 30 December 1973 by the then Prime Minister Mr. Zulfiqar Ali Bhutto. Facing inexperience for the erection work of the integrated steel mill, Bhutto requested Soviet Union to send its experts. Soviet Union sends dozens of advisors and experts, under Russian scientist Mikhail Koltokof, who supervised the construction of this integrated Steel Mills, with a number of industrial and consortium companies financing this mega-project.

From 1973 to 1979, Soviet Union and Pakistan enjoyed a strong relationship with each other which also benefited the Soviet Union. This interaction was short lived after popular unrest began to take place after the 1977 elections. With United States support, the CIA-sponsored operation codenamed Fair Play removed Bhutto from power in 1977. The Soviet relations with Pakistan deteriorated on April 4, 1979, when Bhutto was executed by the Supreme Court of Pakistan. Earlier, Leonid Brezhnev, Alexei Kosygin, and other members of the Politburo had sent repeated calls for clemency to CMLA General Muhammad Zia-ul-Haq who forcefully rejected the Soviet requests. Brezhnev maintained the issue of Bhutto was Pakistan's internal matter but did not wish to see him executed. When Bhutto was hanged, Brezhnev condemned the act out of "purely humane motives".

=== Military presidency (1977–1988) ===
==== Cooperation in energy sector ====
In November 1981, the USSR financially funded and solely establishing the Guddo Thermal Power Station, and surprise Pakistan by offering to build a second nuclear power plant in May 1981. On 1 March 1990, the USSR again offered its nuclear deal with Pakistan and officially stated that the Pakistan has to increase its power generation needs and the USSR Ambassador to Pakistan, V.P. Yakunin, quoted that "once the required guarantees are provided, there is no harm in supplying a nuclear power plant to Pakistan." The Pakistan Production Minister, Shahid Zafar immediately traveled to Moscow for such offer and discussed the issue on a visit; this was followed by Foreign Secretary of Pakistan, Tanveer Ahmad, shortly visiting the country. However, after analyzing the technology, Benazir Bhutto of Pakistan (Prime minister at that time) rebuffed the plan and a made move to secure French deal which also went into cold storage. In April 1981, Pakistan and Soviet Union formed a joint private company to start the manufacture of the agriculture tractors, for which Soviet Union offered $20 million US dollars. In November 1981, the Soviet Ambassador to Pakistan, V.S. Smirnov, publicly announced that the USSR was ready to provide the financial and technical assistance to set up the export-oriented industries. In 1983, the USSR agreeably sold components of oil-drilled equipment for the construction of the Multan Heavy Water Reactor (Multan-I). In 1985, with Soviet presence, President Zia-ul-Haq inaugurated the vertically integrated and the largest Steel Mill in the South Asia, the Pakistan Steel Mills in Karachi, on 15 January 1985. This project was completed at a capital cost of Rs.24,700 million; and even as today, the Steel Mills maintains a respected history and great symbol for the relations of USSR and Pakistan.

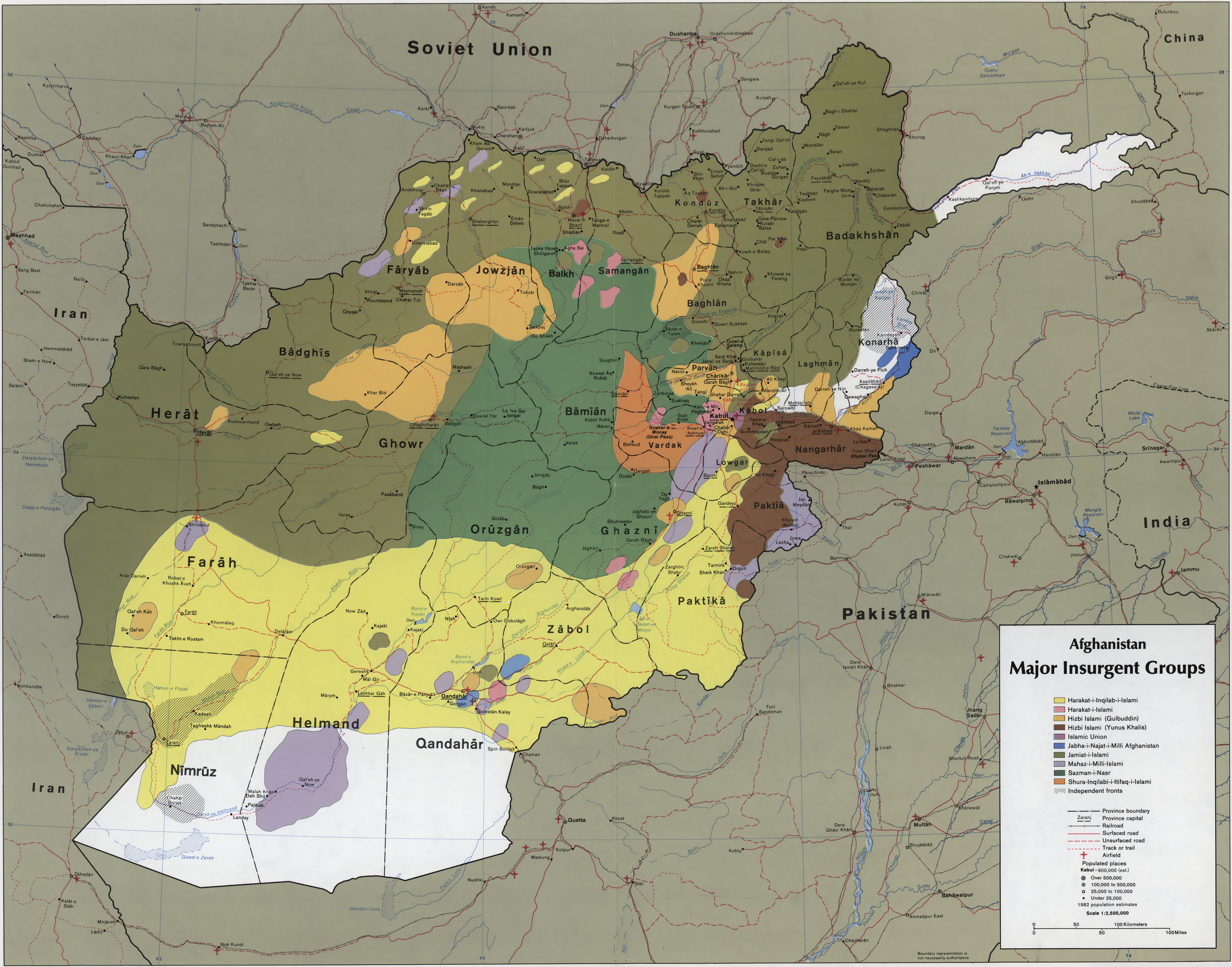
Communist Afghanistan: Map showing areas involving heavy fighting. Note: Areas adjacent to Balochistan province are remained untouched (white region, south) from the fighting while the NWFP (north-west) inflicted with heavy fighting.

Shortly after the Soviet intervention in Afghanistan, military ruler General Muhammad Zia-ul-Haq called for a meeting of senior military members and technocrats of his military government. At this meeting, General Zia-ul-Haq asked the Chief of Army Staff General Khalid Mahmud Arif (veteran of 1965 and 1971 war) and the Chairman of the Joint Chiefs of Staff Admiral Muhammad Shariff (who was made POW by India during the Bangladesh Liberation War in 1971) to lead a specialized civil-military team to formulate a geo-strategy to counter the Soviet aggression. At this meeting, the Director-General of the ISI at that time, Lieutenant-General Akhtar Abdur Rahman advocated for an idea of covert operation in Afghanistan by arming the Islamic extremist, and was loudly heard saying: "Kabul must burn! Kabul must burn!". As for Pakistan, the Soviet war with Islamist mujaheddin was a complete revenge in retaliation for the Soviet Union's long support of regional rival, India, notably during the 1971 war, which led the loss of East Pakistan.

In 1980–85, the Soviet direct investment increased from 10% to 15% after officially signing an economic cooperation agreement in 1985. The overall 1.6% of all Pakistan's exports were accounted in 1981, which increased to 2.5% in 1985. Particularly, the Soviet material exports exceeded the imports in three-fold method in early 1980. Unlike, India, the USSR and Pakistan were able to continue the trade of their preferable machinery and technical goods, whilst also cooperated in agricultural products. However, the Soviet Union maintained its restriction to exploit its military equipment and technology to Pakistan, instead offering an economic package (restrictively based on civilian basis) to Pakistan in 1981. Instead, Pakistan went to secure the arms deal with the United States in 1981, including the acquisition of F-16 fighter jets.

In 1980, the relationship took a dangerous turn, when Soviet press, notable "Pravda" and other Soviet commentators, began to issue threatening statements towards Pakistan. Soviet Commentator, V Baikov, went far enough to say: The axis of United States and China, is trying to secure a base for its rapid deployment force, presumable offering F-16 fighter plans in that view." Another Soviet commentator "threateningly" asked Pakistan that "If she (Pakistan) thought about where the United States was pulling it in its hostilities with Afghanistan; their aggression was taking place in the vicinity of the USSR". In February 1980, a delegation of TASS in New York City maintains that, "One can see the contours of dangerous plans aimed at Pakistan's arch rivals – India, Soviet Union, and Afghanistan. The change of administration in 1980 and immediate verbal threat of Soviet Union to Pakistan, brought the United States and Pakistan on a five-year trade, economic and military agreement, valuing approximately ~3.2 billion US dollars.

The U.S. viewed the conflict in Afghanistan as an integral Cold War struggle, and the CIA provided assistance to anti-Soviet forces through the ISI, in a program called Operation Cyclone. The siphoning off of aid weapons, in which the weapons logistics and coordination were put under the Pakistan Navy in the port city of Karachi, contributed to disorder and violence there, while heroin entering from Afghanistan to pay for arms contributed to addiction problems. The Pakistan Navy coordinated the foreign weapons into Afghanistan, while some of its high-ranking admirals were responsible for storing the weapons in the Navy logistics depot, later coordinated the weapons supply to Mujaheddin, out of complete revenge of Pakistan Navy's brutal loss and defeat at the hands of the Soviet backed Indian Navy in 1971.

In November 1982, General Zia attended the funeral, in Moscow, of Leonid Brezhnev, the late General Secretary of the Communist Party of the Soviet Union. Soviet Foreign Minister Andrei Gromyko and new Secretary General Yuri Andropov met with Zia there. Andropov expressed indignation over Pakistan's covert support of the Afghan resistance against the Soviet Union and its satellite state, Communist Afghanistan. Zia took his hand and assured him, "General Secretary, believe me, Pakistan wants nothing but very good relations with the Soviet Union". According to Gromyko, Zia's sincerity convinced them, but Zia's actions didn't live up to his words. Ironically, Zia directly dealt with the Israel, working to build covert relations with Israel, allowing the country to actively participate in Soviet–Afghan War. Helped by ISI, the Mossad channeled Soviet reversed engineered weapons to Afghanistan. In Charlie Wilson's own word, Zia reported to have remarked to Israeli intelligence service: "Just don't put any stars of David on the boxes".

==== Soviet–Afghan war ====
Relations between Pakistan and the Soviet Union fell to a low point following the Soviet Union's military involvement in Afghanistan. Pakistan supported the anti-communist and religious extremist Mujahedeen forces who fought to overthrow the communist Afghan Government, which had usurped power in the Saur revolution in 1978, whereas the Soviets, ostensibly to support the communist People's Democratic Party of Afghanistan, entered Afghanistan, staged a coup, killed Hafizullah Amin, and installed Soviet loyalist Babrak Karmal as leader.

Pakistani support for the Mujahideen later brought in the involvement of the United Kingdom, the United States, Saudi Arabia and China's support for the same anti-Soviet cause. Pakistan would receive aid from other Muslim nations, China, and the US in the advent of war by the USSR according to General Zia. American presence in Pakistan as well as anti-Soviet/communist Mujahideen havens resulted in Soviet attempts to bombard targets in Pakistan by air that were seen as a threat to the security of Soviet forces in Afghanistan. Some of these resulted in air to air skirmishes between the Soviet Air Force and the Pakistan Air Force (PAF).

==== Democratic governments (1989–1991) ====
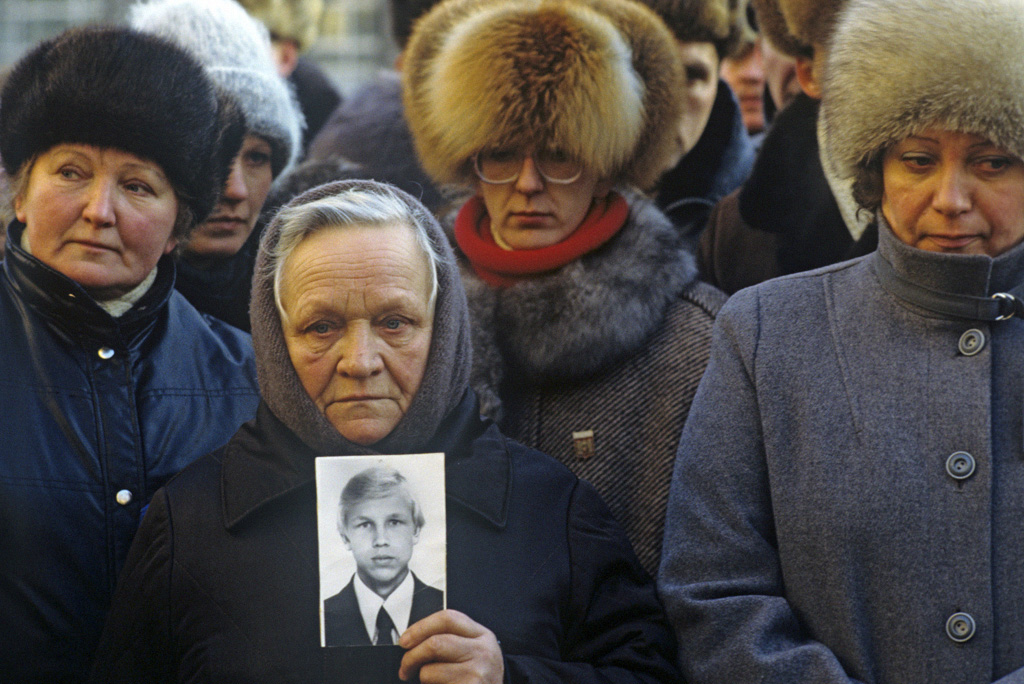
Mothers of Soviet soldiers meeting at the Pakistani Embassy, Moscow appealing to the Bhutto government for rescuing Soviet soldiers from captivity. It was not until 1992 when the Sharif government released the details of soldiers.

Prime Minister Benazir Bhutto (daughter of Zulfikar Ali Bhutto) authorized further aggressive military operations in Afghanistan to topple the fragile communist regime and to end the Soviet influence. One of her military authorizations was a military action in Jalalabad of Afghanistan in retaliation for the Soviet Union's long unconditional support of India, a proxy war in Pakistan, and Pakistan's loss in 1971 war. This operation was "a defining moment for her [Benazir's] government" to prove the loyalty to Pakistan Armed Forces. This operation planned by then-Director General of the Inter-Services Intelligence (ISI) Lieutenant-General Hamid Gul, with inclusion of U.S. ambassador to Pakistan Robert Oakley. Known as Battle of Jalalabad, it was intended to gain a conventional victory on Soviet Union after Soviet Union had withdrawn its troops. But the operation failed miserably and the Afghan army supported by Soviet scuds won the battle resulting in ISI chief being sacked by the Prime Minister

At the end of years of Cold War, Soviet Union announced to establish a 1 GW commercial nuclear power plant in Pakistan, but after witnessing its aging technology Prime Minister Benazir Bhutto, later followed by Prime Minister Nawaz Sharif, did not authorize the purchase and showed little interest in aging Soviet technology.

In 1992, Prime Minister Nawaz Sharif released the details and company of Soviet soldiers to the Russian government when Alexander Rutskoy visited the country, after meeting in a committee led by Deputy Foreign Minister of Pakistan, Shahryar Khan.

== Political relations with Left-wing sphere of Pakistan ==
As late in 1960s, Zulfikar Ali Bhutto had been determined to oust the United States and the Central Intelligence Agency, and subsequently paid visit to Soviet Union as early in 1974. Since then, Pakistan Peoples Party had been sympathetic to the Soviet Union, although it never allied with the Soviet Union nor the United States. The Soviet Union had extremely close relations with the Awami National Party (ANP) and the Communist Party of Pakistan. The Awami National Party, since its inception, has been a staunch and loyal supporter of the Soviet Union. In 1980s, the ANP had strong link that traced back to the Soviet Union and its entire leadership escaped to the Soviet Union and the Democratic Republic of Afghanistan, whilst the third and second leadership took refuge in Afghanistan, the first and top level leadership was given asylum in Moscow and parts of the Soviet Union by the Soviet government.

During the period of 1977–91, the Communist Party of the Soviet Union (CPSU) started its covert political activities through the Awami National Party, many of its senior leadership served Soviets intermediary and advisers. The ANP and the PPP and other leftist entities formed the Movement for the Restoration of Democracy (MRD) that began to resisted Zia's right-wing alliance, who had been supporting the Afghan mujaheddin factions in Soviet Afghanistan. During the most of 1980s, the ANP demanded the end of backing of Afghan mujaheddin and acceptance of Kabul's terms for speedy repatriation. In 1987, calculations completed by Pakistan Institute of Public Opinions (PIPO), around ~66% of party's respondents expressed themselves against Pakistan's continuing support of Afghan mujahideen.

However, the MRD suffered many set backs because of its pro-Leninist stance which was not the "line" of Kremlin at that time. The events that led the collapse of the Soviet Union shattered Pakistan's left. It almost disappeared, until Benazir Bhutto succeeded to unite the scattered leftists mass, which integrated into the PPP, and turned the radical and pro-Soviet leftists into more Social democracy with the principles of democratic socialism.

== Pakistan personalities with Soviet Honors ==
- Faiz Ahmed Faiz – Lenin Peace Prize (1962)
- Abdul Sattar Edhi – Lenin Peace Prize (1988)
- Abdus Salam – Lomonosov Gold Medal (1983)

== Soviet personalities with Pakistan Honors ==
- Anna Molka – Tamgha-i-Imtiaz (1963) and Pride of Performance (1969)
- Mikhail Koltokof – Pride of Performance (1987)

== Scholars exchange cooperation ==
=== List of Pakistani scholars of Soviet studies ===
- Abdul Sattar
- Jamsheed Marker
- Khurshid Kasuri
- Tariq Fatemi

== Relations between the Post-Soviet states and Pakistan ==
- Armenia
- Azerbaijan
- Belarus
- Estonia
- (Georgia (country)) Georgia
- Kazakhstan
- Kyrgyzstan
- Latvia
- Lithuania
- Moldova
- Russia
- Tajikistan
- Turkmenistan
- Ukraine
- Uzbekistan

== See also ==
=== People ===
- Alexander Rutskoy a former Soviet POW briefly held in Pakistan after being shot down by the PAF

=== Archeology ===
- Sintashta culture
- Abashevo culture
- Andronovo culture
