= Guddu =

Guddu may refer to:

- Guddu (film), a 1995 Indian Hindi-language romance film by Prem Lalwani, starring Shah Rukh Khan and Manisha Koirala
- Guddu (cartoon character), character in an Indian webcomic by Faisal Mohammed
- Guddu, nickname of Indian actor and filmmaker Rakesh Roshan (born 1949)
- Guddu, Pakistan, a town in Sindh, Pakistan
- Guddu (TV series), 2022 Pakistani TV serial
- Guddu (film archivist), Pakistani film archivist
