= Pakistan–Russia relations =

- Pakistan: Russia

Diplomatic mission
- Embassy of Pakistan, Moscow: Embassy of Russia, Islamabad

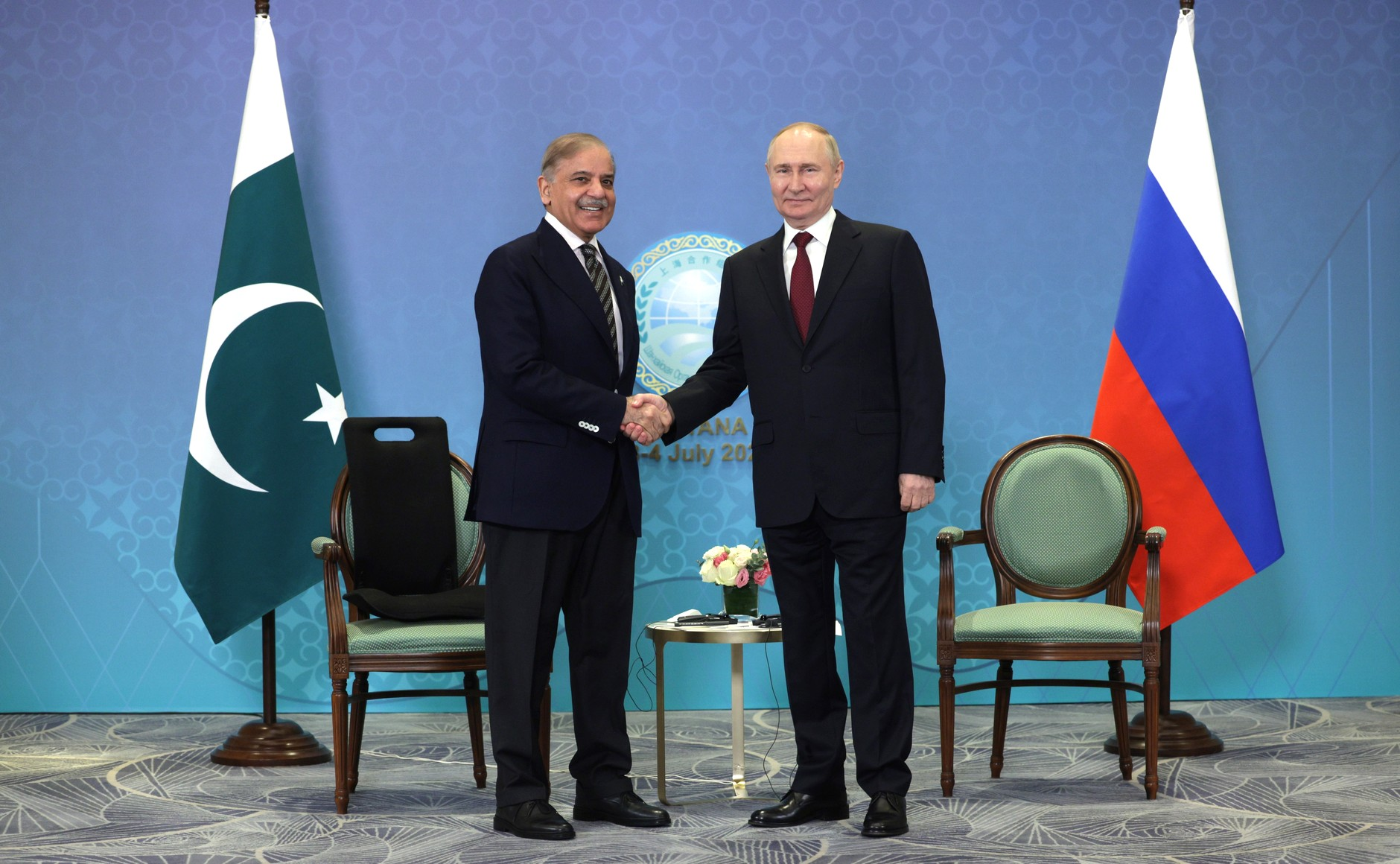
Pakistani Prime Minister Shehbaz Sharif meeting with Russian President Vladimir Putin on 3 July 2024

Pakistan and Russia established bilateral diplomatic relations in 1991. Pakistan has an embassy in Moscow and Russia has an embassy in Islamabad. Both states are close allies and considered "strategic partners".

Prior to the establishment of the Russian Federation in 1991, Pakistan–Soviet relations were largely tense and hostile as Pakistan was part of the Western Bloc that opposed the Soviet-led Eastern Bloc. However, since the dissolution of the Soviet Union, Pakistan and Russia have generally maintained cordial relations. In recent years ties between Russia and Pakistan have warmed as a countermeasure to warming ties between India and the United States. The two countries carried out their first-ever joint military drills in 2016. Pakistan and Russia signed an agreement for the Pakistan Stream Gas pipeline from Karachi to Kasur, and reached a price accord by December 2016. Pakistan has also granted Russia access to a warm water port in the Arabian Sea (Gwadar Port). Since Pakistan joined the Shanghai Cooperation Organisation in 2017, relations between both sides have deepened. Pakistan celebrated the 70th and 75th anniversary of diplomatic relations with Russia.

Russian president Vladimir Putin declared Pakistan as one of its primary partners in South Asia. Pakistani prime minister Shehbaz Sharif also considered strengthening ties with Russia as a foremost priority for Pakistan.

== Historical relations ==
=== Ancient history ===
Almost all of Pakistan's languages descend from a common ancestor that was spoken in the Sintashta region in today's Russia during the mid Bronze Age. The descendants this ancient language were brought to the area of present-day Pakistan and neighboring regions through centuries of earlier Indo-Aryan and later Iranic steppe migrations through Central Asia between the first and second mellinia BCE.

=== Modern history ===
Soviet relations with Pakistan (then part of the British Raj) dated back to 1922 after the Bolshevik Revolution. From 1922 to 1927, people who entered from the Soviet Union into the territory (now Pakistan) held by the British Empire, attempted to start a communist revolution against the British Indian Empire. The series of coups known as Peshawar Conspiracy Cases; the British Empire was terrified after the intelligence on attempted communist revolution in the Raj were revealed to authorities. From 1947 to 1950 and 1965–1969, the trade, educational, and cultural exchanges between two countries increased. But the Soviet efforts were undermined by the Soviet Union by itself when Soviet criticism of Pakistan's position in the 1971 war with India weakened bilateral relations, and many people of Pakistan believed that the August 1971 Indo-Soviet Treaty of Friendship, Peace and Cooperation encouraged India invasion of East Pakistan. Subsequent Soviet arms sales to India, amounting to billions of dollars on concessional terms, reinforced this argument. The USSR also kept vetoing every resolution regarding the East Pakistan situation that Pakistan brought to the United Nations.

== Relations with the Russian Federation: 1991-present ==
After the Soviet Union troop withdrawal withdrawing the combatant troops from Communist Afghanistan, relations began to normalize with Pakistan. In the wake of fall of communism, Russian Federation-Pakistan relations were warmed rapidly. In 1989, Soviet ambassador to Pakistan offered Pakistan to install a commercial nuclear power plant in the country, however after U.S. intervention, the plans were sent into cold storage. In 1994–95, Benazir Bhutto attempted to warm relations with Russia but suffered a major setback when Benazir Bhutto's government recognized Taliban-controlled government in Afghanistan as legitimate entity. In 1996, Russia willingly agreed to launch Pakistan's second satellite, Badr-B, from its Baikonur Cosmodrome for the lowest possible charges.

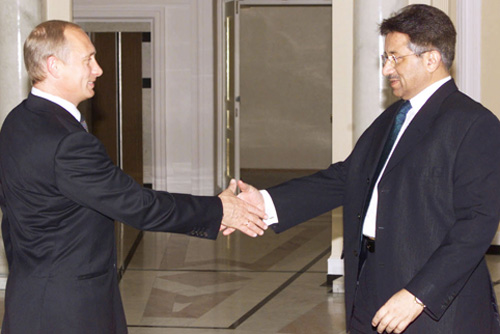
Pervez Musharraf shakes hands with Vladimir Putin (left), 2002.

In 1997, Prime Minister Nawaz Sharif attempted to warm relations with Russia after sending farewell messages to Russian Federation. In 1998, although Russia congratulated India for conducting second nuclear tests, (see Pokhran-II), Russia did not immediately criticize Pakistan for performing its nuclear tests (see Chagai-I and Chagai-II) by the weekend of May 1998. In April 1999, Prime Minister Nawaz Sharif paid an important state visit to Kremlin, this was the first trip to Moscow paid by a Pakistani Prime Minister in 25 years, but no breakthrough was made. In 1999, Russia welcomed Pakistan and India for making a breakthrough in their relations with the Lahore Declaration but vehemently criticized Pakistan for holding it responsible for the outbreak of Indo-Pakistani War of 1999. Meanwhile, Russia played a major role in ending the war but remained hostile towards Pakistan.

Russia condemned the 1999 Pakistani coup d'état against Nawaz Sharif that removed him from power. On 19 April 2001, the Russian Deputy Minister of Foreign Affairs Alexander Losyukov paid a state visit to Pakistan, and both countries agreed to co-operate in economic development and to work towards peace and prosperity in the region. In the wake of September 11, 2001 attacks, the relations were warmed rapidly when Pakistan denounced the Taliban and joined the NATO coalition to hunt down jihadist organizations and al-Qaeda. The decision of Pakistan to join the international struggle against terrorism has led to Russia-Pakistan relations being greatly improved. Russia also played an integral role to ease off the nuclear 2001 Indo-Pakistan tensions.

In November 2016, Pakistan also decided to grant Russia access to the Gwadar Port, a warm water sea port as has done to both Iran and Turkmenistan.

=== Improvement in relations ===
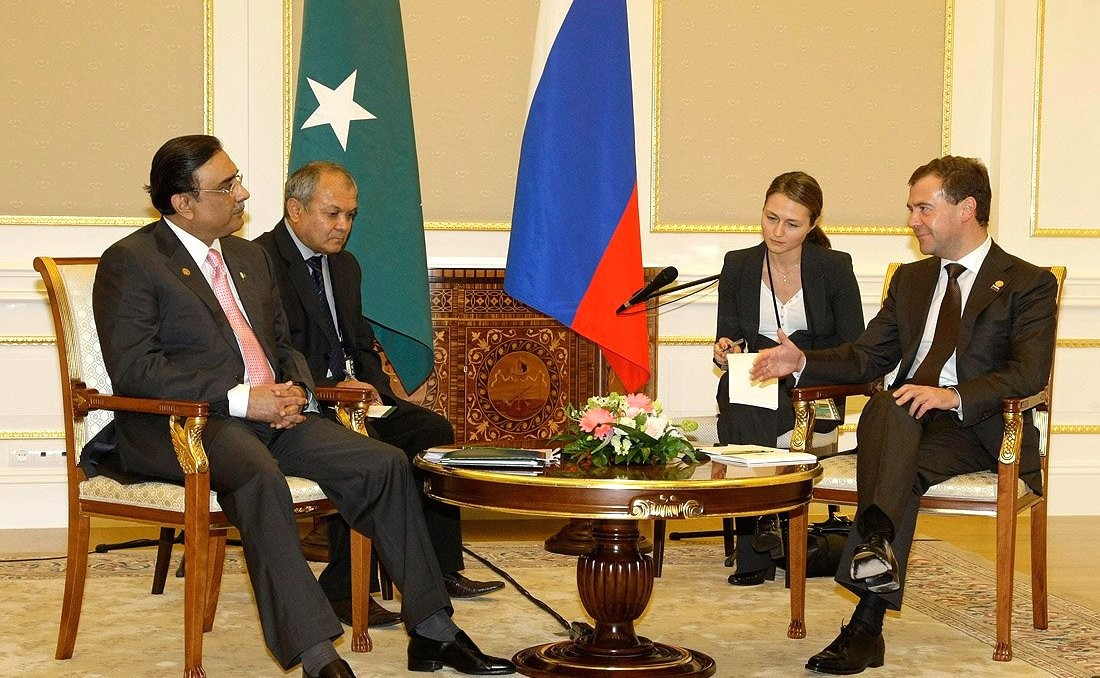
Dmitry Medvedev (right) meeting Asif Zardari (left) in 2010.

We must know where we deceived ourselves to avoid being deceived again.... Russia is one of our closest neighbors... And (could) be an important partner.

— Ardeshir Cowasjee and Dawn News, Cited source

Russia vowed its support for Pakistan in its struggle against the Taliban militants. In 2007, the relations between Pakistan and the Russian Federation were reactivated after the 3-day official visit of Russian Prime Minister Mikhail Fradkov. He was the first Russian Prime Minister to visit Pakistan in the post Soviet-era in 38 years. He had "in-depth discussions" with President Pervez Musharraf and Prime Minister Shaukat Aziz.

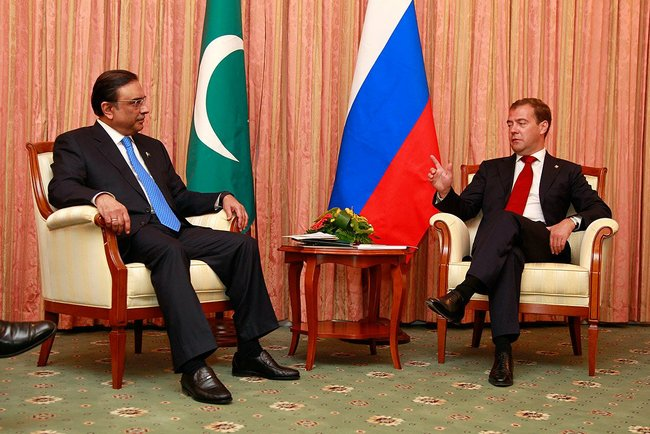
Dmitry Medvedev engaged in conversation with Asif Zardari, 2010.

The major focus of the visit was to improve bilateral relations with particular emphasis on ways and means to enhance economic cooperation between the two countries. Under the Presidency of Asif Ali Zardari and Prime Minister Yousef Raza Gilani, relations between Pakistan and Russia improved significantly. In 2010, Russian Prime Minister Vladimir Putin stated that Russia was against developing strategic and military ties with Pakistan because of Russian desire to place emphasis on strategic ties with India.

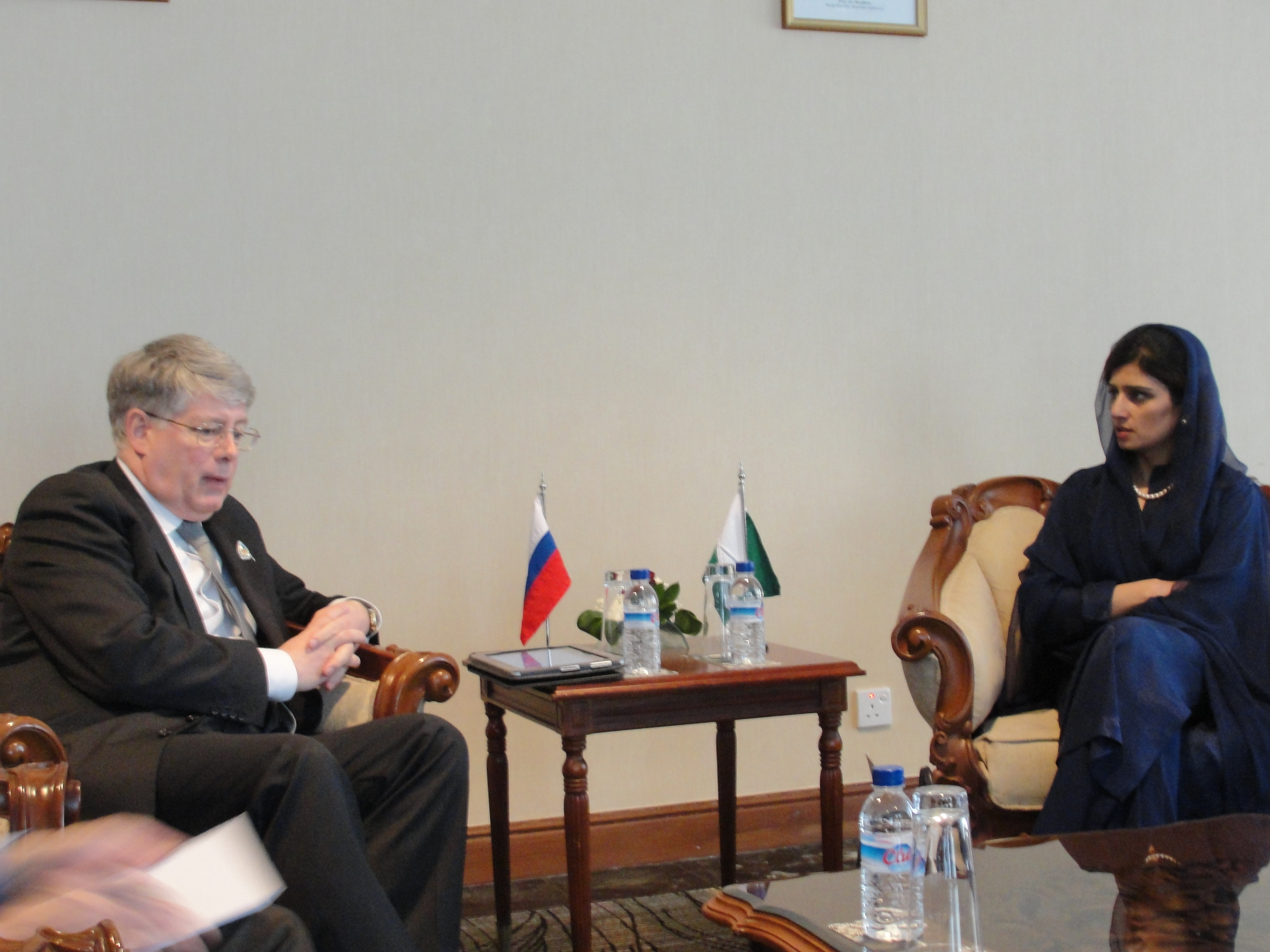
Hina Rabbani Khar meeting with Russian deputy foreign minister A.N. Borodavkin, 2012.

In 2011, Russia changed its policy and Putin publicly endorsed Pakistan's bid to join the Shanghai Cooperation Organisation and said that Pakistan was a very important partner in South Asia and the Muslim world for Russia. Putin offered Russia's assistance in expansion of Pakistan Steel Mills and provision of technical support for the Guddu and Muzaffargarh power plants and Russia was interested in developing the Thar Coal Project In 2011, Russia strongly condemned the NATO strike in Pakistan and the Russian foreign minister stated it is unacceptable to violate the sovereignty of a state, even when planning and carrying out counter-insurgent operations. In 2012, Russian president Vladimir Putin announced to pay a state visit to Pakistan soon after his re-election, later he cancelled it, citing other crucial engagement. To offset the diplomatic setback caused by this unexpected cancellation of much-anticipated visit, Putin's sent his Foreign Minister Sergey Lavrov.

Meanwhile, Pakistan army chief general Ashfaq Parvez Kayani visited Moscow from October 4 for three-day official visit. Where he was received warmly by Defence Minister Anatoly Serdyukov and Russian Ground Forces Commander-in-Chief (C-in-C) Colonel General Vladimir Chirkin.

On 5-August-2013 Colonel General Vladimir Chirkin visited Pakistan where he was received by General Ashfaq Parvez Kayani. The two generals discussed matters of mutual interest with emphasis on improving defence cooperation, army-to-army relations the security situation in the region, especially in Afghanistan post 2014.

In a press conference, the ambassador of Russia has agreed to sell helicopters to Pakistan to assist the country with terrorism and security related issues. Russia was still holding talks with Pakistan on the supply of the combat helicopters, and had lifted its embargo on the arms supply to Pakistan. "Such a decision has been taken. We are holding talks on supplying the helicopters," head of state-owned Rostec, Sergei Chemezov said, adding that the negotiations were about Russian Mi-35 Hind attack helicopters. Russia has long been the largest supplier of arms to India, which is the world's top arms buyer. But Moscow's move to supply Islamabad came as New Delhi is seeking to modernise its armed forces' ageing hardware and has recently chosen to buy arms from Israel, France, Britain and the United States.

Pakistan and Russia wrapped up their first strategic dialogue on 31-August-2013. At the talks held at the foreign secretaries' level in Moscow, the Pakistani side was led by Foreign Secretary Jalil Abbas Jilani and Russia's First Deputy Minister of Foreign Affairs Vladimir Georgiyevich Titov led his side. Russian Deputy Foreign Minister Igor Morgulov also participated in the consultations. The dialogue, the Foreign Office says, lays an institutional framework for building closer relations between the two countries through discussions for cooperation in political, economic, defence and other sectors. The two sides exchanged views on regional and international developments. Broadly, Pakistan and Russia agreed for more high-level contacts, closely coordinating positions on regional and international issues, and expanding trade and investment relations and cooperation in the field of energy and power generation. In July 2015 The COAS General Raheel Sharif paid a visit to Russia where he was received by the military leadership of Russia at Kremlin. This was the 1st visit of An COAS to Russia. He was given a Guard of Honour and while laying wreath at the Tomb of Unknown Soldier the National Anthem of Pakistan was played. This was seen as an improvement in ties as Russia's longtime ally India moved towards US. Pakistan, Russia signs a landmark defence deal in 2015. This deal includes sale of four Mi-35 ‘Hind E’ attack helicopters to Pakistan. Russia is also interested in joining CPEC, which will benefit CPEC and strengthen Pakistan's economy. Another deal in 2015 includes Russia to invest $2bn in project of constructing north–south gas pipeline, first phase of which is expected to conclude by Dec 2017.

=== Economic and geopolitical convergence ===
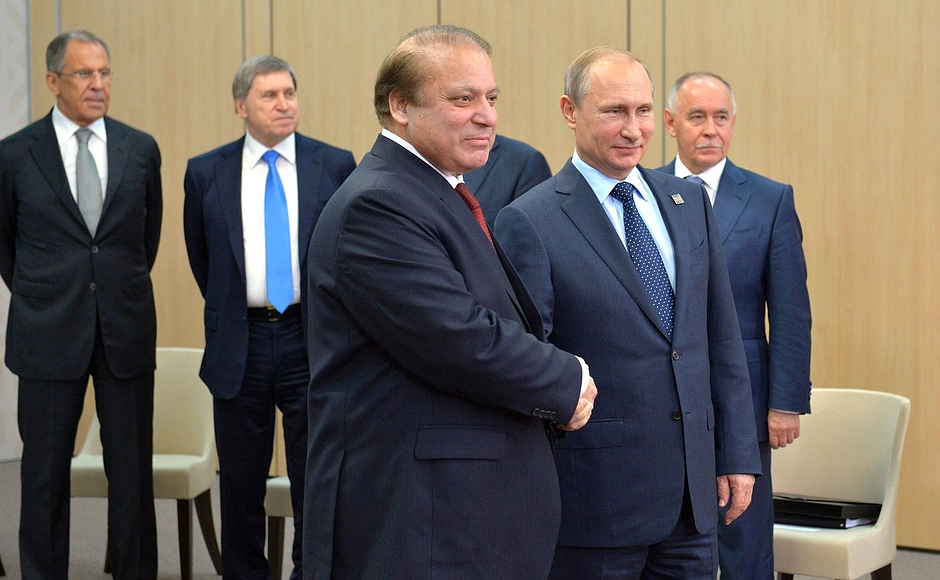
President Putin meets Pakistani Prime Minister Nawaz Sharif.

In 1990, Benazir Bhutto of Pakistan sent a fare well message to Moscow in an attempt to set up the economic coordination between the two countries. In 1991, Benazir Bhutto headed a high-level economic delegation to Central Asia and Russia after the collapse of Soviet Union.

In 2003, the bilateral trade between Russia and Pakistan reached to 92 million US dollar, which increased to 411.4 million in 2006. The bilateral trade between each country reached to 630 million in 2008 and ~400 million in 2009. During this following year, both countries established the "Russian–Pakistan Intergovernmental Commission on Trade and Economic, Scientific and Technical Cooperation to cooperation in science and technology and education.

In 2011, Prime Minister Yousaf Raza Gillani and Vladimir Putin held a frank discussion in a cordial atmosphere on the 10th Heads of Government meeting of the Shanghai Cooperation Organisation. Russia is currently financing the mega-energy project, CASA-1000, transmitting power generation from Turkmenistan, Tajikistan, and Kyrgyzstan to Pakistan; Russia has provided 500Mn US dollars for the CASA-1000 power transmission project. In 2011, both countries initiated the work on the framework n the proposed Free Trade Agreement and currency swap arrangement to boost bilateral trade and further strengthen their economic ties.

In 2012, Russia and Pakistan have covertly developed geopolitical and strategic relations behind the scenes of world politics for the last two years, as Stephen Blank of Strategic Studies Institute maintained. As the NATO-led ISAF and the US Forces, Afghanistan Command, is planning to depart Afghanistan in 2014, the Russian Federation came to a conclusion that Pakistan is a crucial player in Afghanistan and that, as NATO withdraws, it becomes all the more urgent for Moscow to seek some sort of modus vivendi with Islamabad.

==== Cooperation of Pakistan after joining the SCO ====
In November 2019, Pakistan decided to solve a Soviet-era trade dispute with Russia, in which the Pakistani government should pay $93.5 million to Russia within 90 days. The settlement would pave the way for Russia to invest over $8 billion in Pakistan.

The Special Representative of Pakistan for Afghanistan, Mohammad Sadiq, noted after visit in Moscow on September 9, 2022, that both sides share similar views on the situation in Afghanistan and plan to continue consultations on this issue in the future.

Against the background of catastrophic floods in Pakistan in 2022 and possible food shortages, Russia, in addition to gas supplies, offered to supply wheat to Pakistan. In addition, on the sidelines of the SCO summit, at a meeting with Shehbaz Sharif, Russian President Vladimir Putin mentioned that pipeline gas supplies to Pakistan are possible and part of the infrastructure has already been created. In addition, according to the statements of the Minister of Defense of Pakistan, Russian President Vladimir Putin highly appreciated Pakistan's position on the Russian-Ukrainian war at the UN and at the international level.

In June 2026, ministers of Interior Mohsen Naqvi and Vladimir Kolokoltsev, signed a landmark agreement on combating illegal migration, and curbing drug trafficking between the two countries, as ties further expanded amidst both states keen to crackdown on illegal and informal channels of transport.

=== Cooperation in the field of energy ===
Cooperation in the field of energy between Pakistan and Russia occupies an important place in bilateral relations, since the Russian Federation is an advanced power in the field of oil and gas production, and Pakistan, in turn, is a developing country with huge energy needs.

In October 2015, the partners signed an Intergovernmental Agreement on constructing the north–south gas pipeline from Karachi to Lahore. In addition, an Intergovernmental Agreement on Cooperation in Liquefied Natural Gas (LNG) was signed on October 13, 2017. In September 2018, the countries signed a Memorandum of Understanding to conduct a feasibility study for the construction of an offshore gas pipeline. As a follow-up, on February 6, 2019, Russian Gazprom and the Pakistani company Inter State Gas Company Limited signed a Memorandum of Understanding regarding a feasibility study of gas supplies from the Middle East to South Asia.

In January 2022, Imran Khan strongly supported Pakistan Stream gas pipeline and imports of discounted Russian oil and wheat.

In December 2022, Minister of State for Petroleum Musadik Malik says the Pakistani government has held fruitful talks with Russia for import of cheap oil, diesel and gas.

The Express Tribune said that Russia had raised doubt “over the seriousness of Pakistan to mature the oil deal”. Moscow had asked Islamabad to import “one oil cargo” as a test case. The first oil cargo from Russia may arrive in Pakistan by the end of April 2023. The Pakistani prime minister Shehbaz Sharif announced that the country had received its first shipment of discounted Russian oil in 12 June.

=== Military cooperation ===
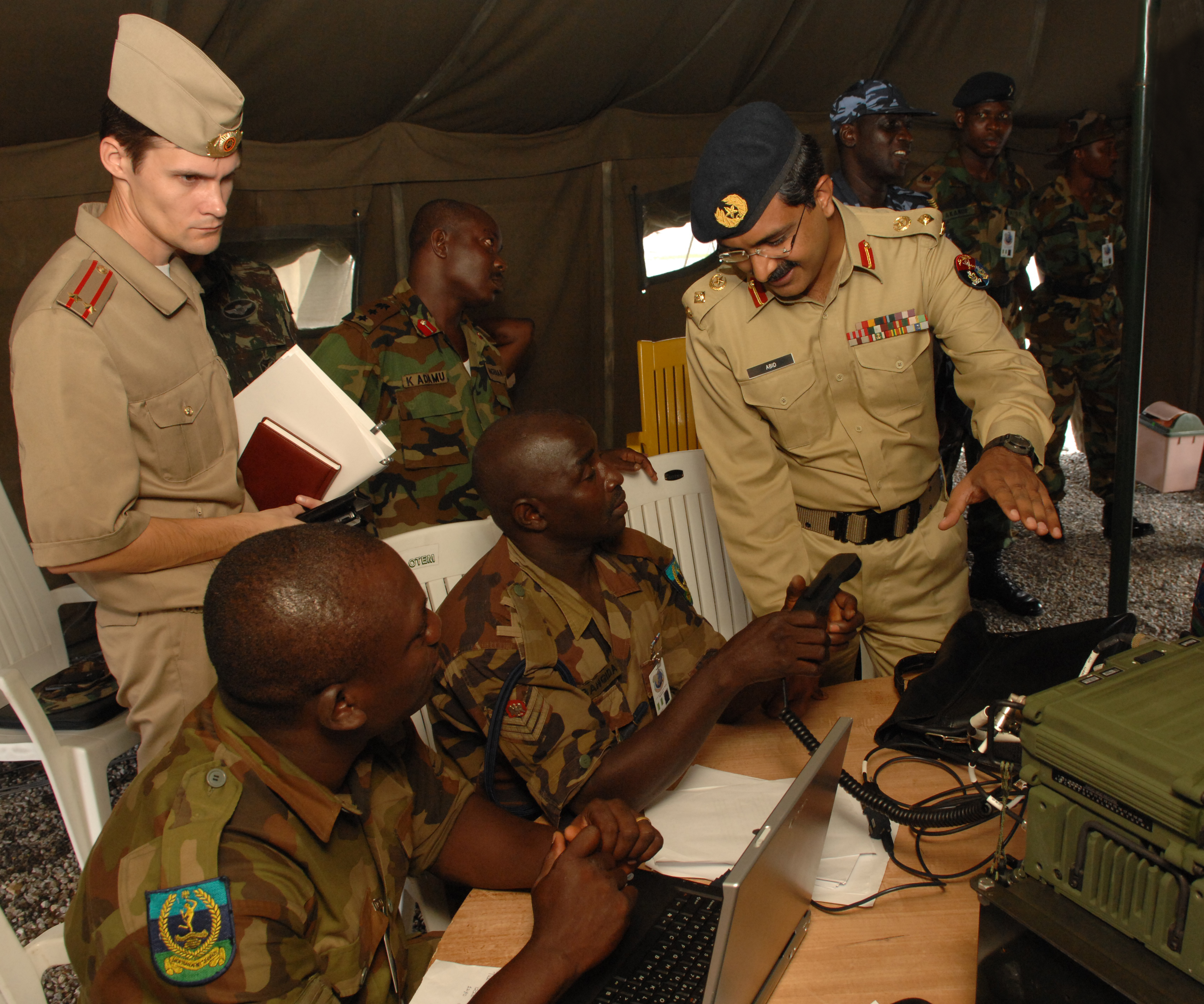
Senior military officials and Defence Attaché of Pakistan and Russia, jointly working together at the communications tent at a Nigerian Air Force Base.

Military-technical cooperation between Russia and Pakistan is under development. The Russian Federation had to establish relations with Pakistan, which were severed at the initiative of the USSR back in the 1980s. In 1996, Russia for the first time signed an agreement on the supply of multi-purpose Mi-17 helicopters to Pakistan. During the period from 1996 to 2004, the Russian Federation supplied about 70 helicopters to the partner.

Increasing military cooperation between Islamabad and Moscow would not negatively impact Russia's ties with India, Deputy Foreign Minister Sergey Ryabkov said in 2015, adding that Pak-Russia ties were improving in other sectors as well—including energy. The two countries signed a defense cooperation agreement in 2014. As of early 2021, Moscow has supplied Pakistan with a batch of Mi-35 attack helicopters and it has signed contracts with the Asian nation to deliver anti-tank systems, air defence weapons and small arms. In addition, Islamabad intended to purchase another 10-12 units of such helicopters and also showed interest in purchasing multi-purpose Su-35 fighters with a longer range than light Chinese JF-17s, which are in service with the Pakistani Air Force along with American F-16s. Back in 2018, the telegram channel "Militarist" reported that Pakistan had finalized a contract for the purchase of 54 SU-35 fighters, however, this information was not confirmed.

On August 7, 2018, during the visit to Pakistan of the Deputy Minister of Defense of the Russian Federation Alexander Fomin, a contract was signed between Moscow and Islamabad, providing Pakistani servicemen with the opportunity to study at universities of the Ministry of Defense of the Russian Federation. The agreement was signed following the results of the first meeting of the Russian-Pakistani Joint Military Advisory Committee (JMCC). Before signing this document, officers of the Pakistani army were trained in the United States.

==== Russian Army War Games 2015 ====
Pakistan Army actively participated in the Russian Army War Games 2015 held in the Russian Far East. Pakistan was also among the six countries that took part in the Master of The Air Defense Battle Competition in August 2015 besides Russia, China, Egypt, Venezuela and Belarus.

==== "Friendship" ("Druzhba") exercises ====
The first annual joint exercise between the Russian military and the Pakistan Army took place under the name "Friendship 2016". 70 Russians and 130 Pakistanis took part in the exercise, held from 24 September to 10 October 2016, in Cherat, in Pakistan's north-western Khyber Pakhtunkhwa Province. India had unsuccessfully asked Russia to call off the exercise as a gesture of "solidarity" following the 18 September 2016 militant attack on an Indian Army base, which the government of India had blamed on the government of Pakistan.

From November 8 to 21, 2020, the 5th joint Russian-Pakistani Druzhba 2020 exercise was held. More than 150 servicemen of the armies of the two countries took part in the exercises. From the Armed Forces of the Russian Federation, more than 70 military personnel of special purpose units of the 49th Combined Arms Army of the Southern Military District were involved in the exercise.

October 2021 — joint Russian-Pakistani exercise "Friendship-2021", at the Molkino training ground in the Krasnodar Territory. The main task of the exercises was to improve the ways of interaction when performing a wide range of tasks. Special attention was paid to the development of fighting skills in urban conditions and the use of a "consolidated assault company" in the liberation of settlements and objects captured by terrorists.

From February 15 to 16, 2021, a detachment of ships of the Russian Navy, at the invitation of the Pakistani side, took part in the maritime phase of the multinational naval exercises "Aman-2021".

==== During Russo-Ukrainian war ====
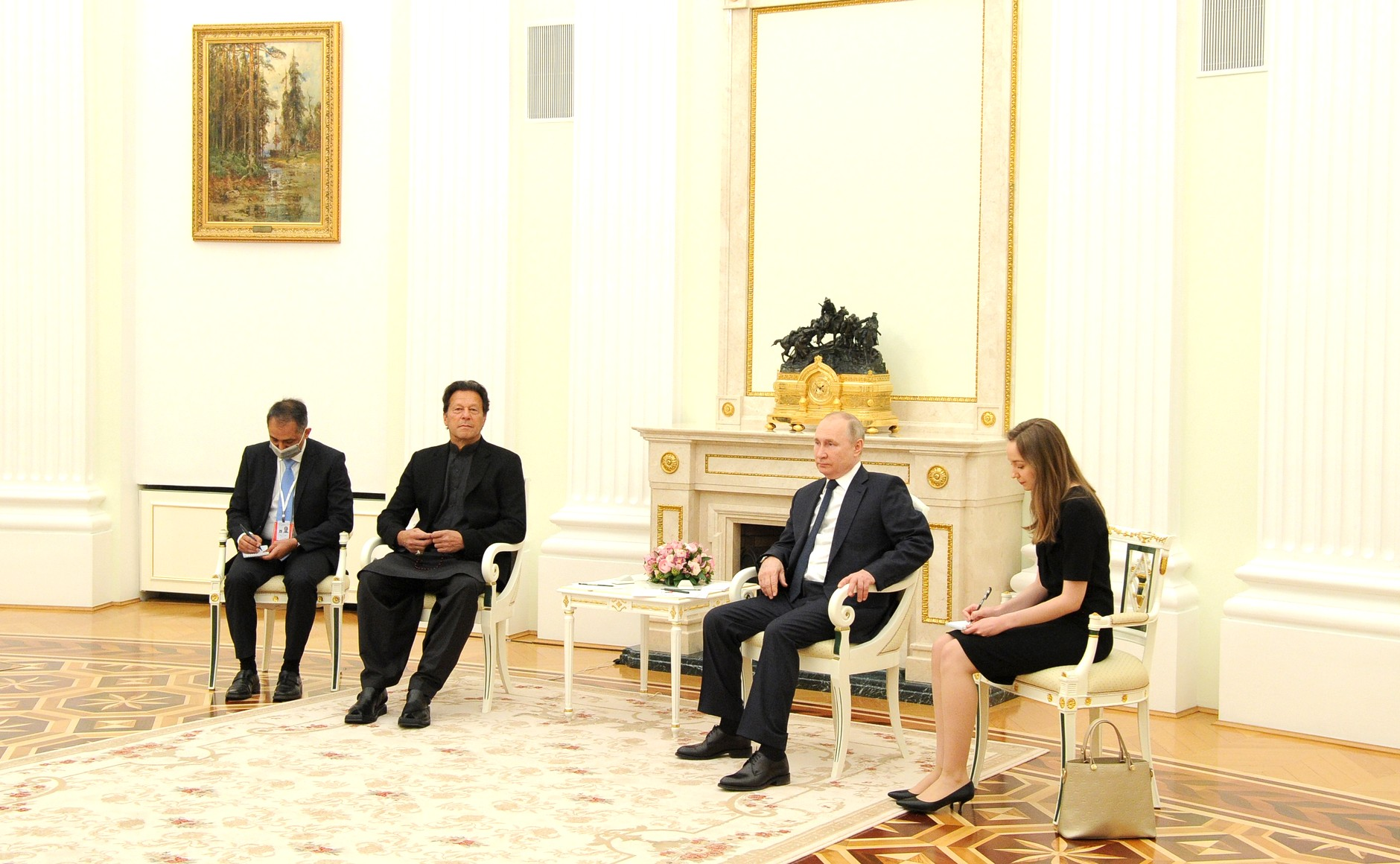
President Putin meets Pakistani Prime Minister Imran Khan in Moscow on the eve of the Russian invasion of Ukraine

Pakistani Prime Minister Imran Khan visited Russia on 23 February 2022. It was the first visit of any Pakistani PM to Russia since 1999. During the two-day visit, he talked with President Putin in Kremlin about strengthening bilateral "economic and energy cooperation".

Pakistan abstained from voting as UN General Assembly censures Russia in March 2022, and says it ‘remains neutral’.

According to Indian media reports, Pakistan has provided weapons to Ukraine despite Russian protests, a claim denied by Pakistan's foreign ministry.

It was reported President of Ukraine Volodymyr Zelenskyy has also made the allegation that Pakistani mercenaries have been recruited by Putin's government to fight against the Ukrainian resistance.

=== Post-flood relief in 2022 ===
After the devastating floods in 2022, Russia provided assistance to Pakistan. Food, tents and water purification devices were handed over.

== Economic relations ==
Pakistan and Russia have a lot to gain from a relationship of understanding and cooperation. Since the full-scale outbreak of the Russo-Ukrainian war, Russia has strengthened its cooperation with Pakistan to circumvent sanctions from the West. Pakistan's bilateral trade with Russia reached an unprecedented $1 billion in 2023. This is largely due to increased fossil fuel imports, with Pakistan importing crude oil from Russia for the first time in that same year. Russia and Pakistan are increasingly cooperating on energy-related issues, particularly oil exploration, production and refining. This signals a major shift in policy for Pakistan, which has historically been hesitant to develop close ties to Russia, given its strong relationship with India.

=== Trade agreements ===
Pakistan and Russia have signed a first ever agreement on barter trade between the two countries in October 2024, as a delegation of over 60 Pakistani companies participated in an inaugural Pakistan-Russia Trade and Investment Forum in Moscow. The forum was inaugurated by Pakistan's Ambassador to Russia Muhammad Khalid Jamali along with high-level Russian officials, including Deputy Minister of Industry and Trade Alexey Gruzdev and Evgeny Fidchuk, an adviser to the Russian transport minister.

=== 2024 Russian Deputy Prime Minister’s Visit to Pakistan ===
Russia's Deputy Prime Minister Alexey Overchuk arrived in Pakistan for a two-day official visit from September 18 to 19. He was welcomed at Islamabad Airport by Pakistan's Ambassador to Moscow, Muhammad Khalid Jamali, and Additional Foreign Secretary Shafqat Ali Khan. During his visit, Overchuk is scheduled to hold talks with President Asif Ali Zardari, Prime Minister Shehbaz Sharif, and Finance Minister Ishaq Dar.

Discussions will focus on potential Liquefied Natural Gas (LNG) transactions, with Russian terminals expected to be ready by 2026. Additionally, a Russian delegation is set to explore establishing a state-of-the-art steel mill at the Pakistan Steel Mills site.

Overchuk emphasized the importance of enhancing socio-cultural ties and cooperation under the Shanghai Cooperation Organisation. At the same time, Moscow will support Islamabad's bid to join BRICS, says Russian deputy prime minister.

Pakistan is keen to expand trade, economic, energy, connectivity and security cooperation with Russia. Signing of a MoU between Russia and Pakistan To further strengthen mutually advantageous cooperation in all areas of shared interest. Pakistan Considers Proposal to Establish New Steel Mill in Karachi with Russian Cooperation.

== Public opinion ==
Due to rapidly shifting global geopolitical interests spurred by the end of the Cold War and the ongoing U.S.-led war on terror, Pakistani public opinion towards Russia has fluctuated in recent years, with 18% viewing Russia favorably in 2007, falling to 11% in 2011 and rising to 20% in 2012, and according to the BBC World Service Poll, 9% of Pakistanis view Russian influence positively in 2010, 14% in 2011, falling to 12% in 2012, and increasing to 18% in 2013.

However, Pakistanis have generally rated Vladimir Putin's leadership poorly, with 7% expressing confidence in him in 2006, and only 3% in 2012, and for the most part, a plurality of Russians have consistently rated Pakistan's influence negatively, with 13% expressing a positive view in 2008, increasing slightly to 14% in 2010, and falling to 8% in 2013.

With the general deterioration of Pakistan's relations with the West and the rise of China, Pakistani public opinion has greatly increased its support for Russia, especially after Imran Khan's historic visit to Moscow.

== Diplomatic missions ==
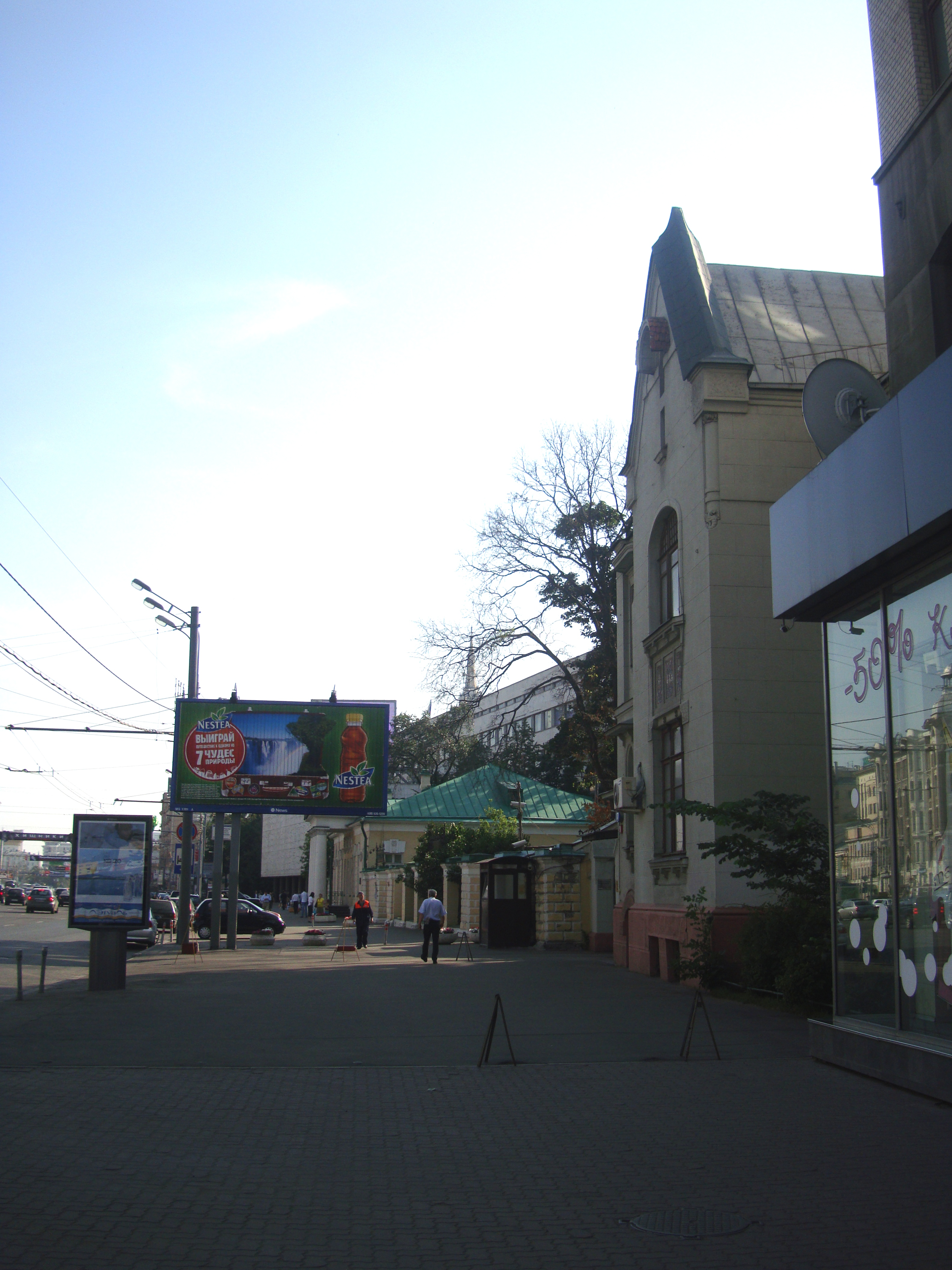
17 Sadovaya-Kudrinskaya street Moscow, Russia, where the Embassy of Pakistan located.

Russia maintains an embassy in the capital of Pakistan, Islamabad, and Pakistan has an embassy in Moscow in Russia.

=== Pakistani Embassy ===
The Pakistani embassy is located in Moscow.

- Ambassador Faisal Niaz Tirmizi

=== Russian Embassy ===
The Russian embassy is located in Islamabad.

- Ambassador Danila Ganich

== Cultural exchanges ==
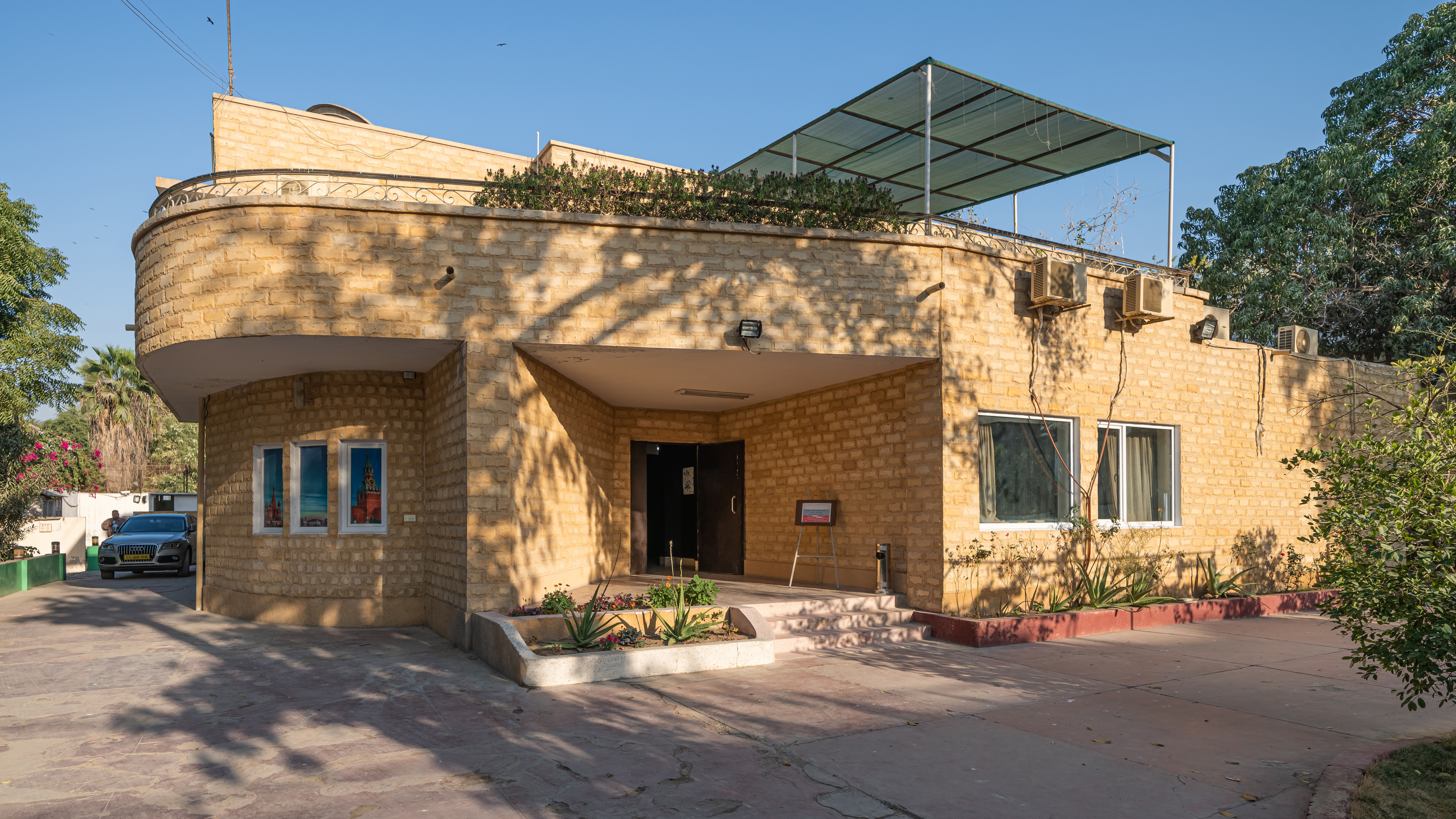
Russian Centre for Science and Culture in Karachi

The world's first bilingual Urdu-Russian dictionary was compiled and launched by Uzbek scholar Dr. Tashmirza Khalmirzaev in 2012 at a ceremony in Islamabad. Khalmirzaev said the dictionary aimed to "help speakers of both languages come closer." He also added that a new era was dawning in Pakistan's relationship with Russia and other Central Asian states and encouraged the government of Pakistan to continue work in promoting Urdu (Lashkari) in Russia and Central Asia.

=== Ideologies ===
On 13 January 2013, a poll in seven countries was managed by the Washington Post, to see whether the people of those seven countries prefer democratic government or one with a "strong" leader. Most Russian and Pakistanis voted that "they prefer a "strong ruler" over democracy."

=== Literature and art ===
A Pakistani Urdu poet Faiz Ahmad Faiz was awarded the Lenin Peace Prize, a Soviet equivalent of Nobel Peace Prize.

Russian language education in Pakistan has historically remained limited but has experienced renewed institutional development in recent years through university programs and cultural initiatives. Formal Russian language courses are offered at several Pakistani universities, including the National University of Modern Languages (NUML) in Islamabad, where Russian is taught as part of the university's foreign language programs. Allama Iqbal Open University (AIOU) has also introduced Russian language courses, with reports in 2023 indicating that more than 100 students completed an early Russian language program offered by the university. Academic studies on Russian as a foreign language in Pakistan have documented the presence of certificate and diploma programs in Russian at Pakistani universities and have noted that the language is primarily studied by students seeking higher education and professional opportunities in Russia. In addition to university-based instruction, cultural and educational activities organized by the Embassy of the Russian Federation in Pakistan have contributed to sustained interest in Russian language learning.

== Media gallery ==
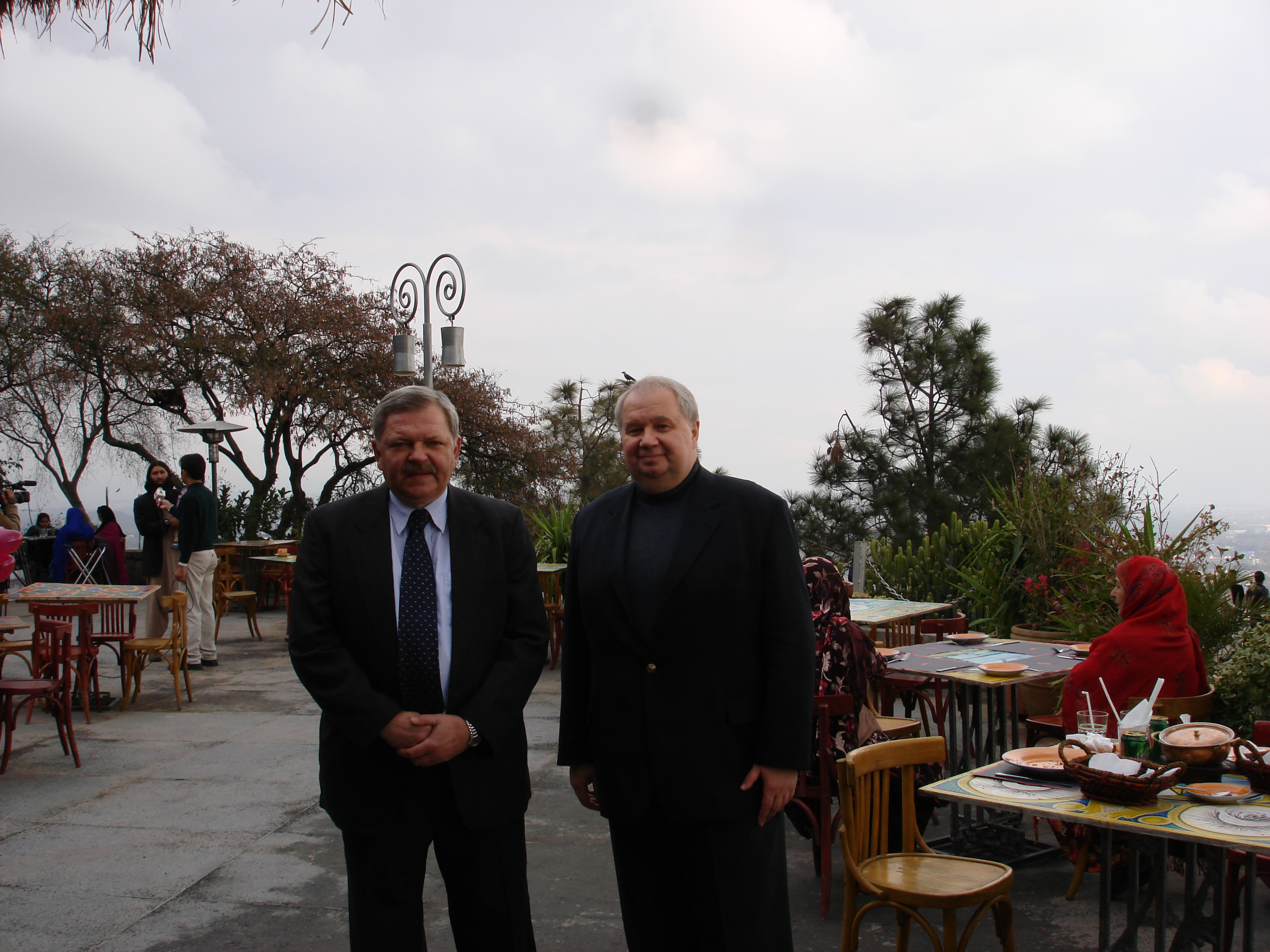
Russian Ambassador to Pakistan H.E. Serguei N. Peskov (left) in Pakistan, 2007.

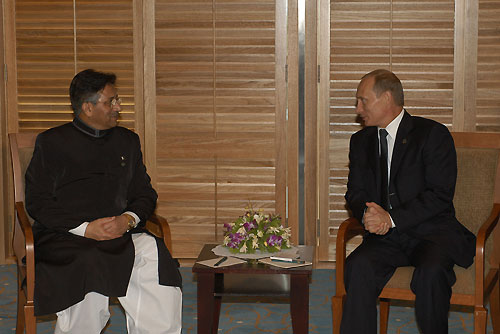
President Putin meeting with his counterpart President Musharraf in 2003.

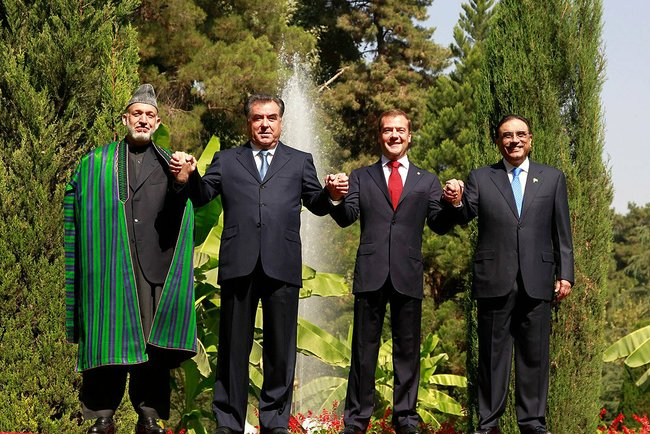
President Zardari holds hands with Russian president Dmitry Medvedev and leaders of the Former Soviet states.

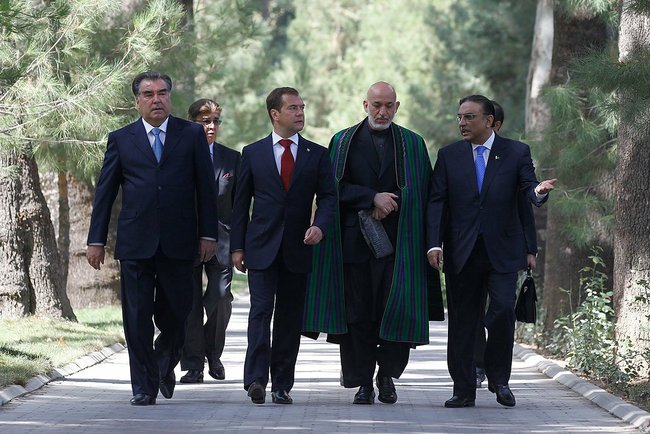
President Zardari engaging in conversation with President Medvedev, 2011.

== See also ==
- Akhlas Akhlaq, a Russian citizen born to a Pakistani father and who was arrested and executed in Pakistan on terrorism charges under mysterious circumstances and unproven allegations.
- List of ambassadors of Russia to Pakistan
- Kharotabad Incident when four Russian nationals were shot dead by members of the paramilitary Frontier Corps. It occurred in the Pakistani province of Balochistan.
- Abashevo culture
- Andronovo culture
