= Victor Yakunin =

Soviet-Russian diplomat (1931–2025)

Victor Pavlovich Yakunin (Russian: Виктор Павлович Якунин; 18 January 1931 – 6 November 2025) was a Soviet and Russian diplomat who served as the Soviet Ambassador to Pakistan from 1985 until 1993. He was preceded by Vitaly S. Smirnov and his tenure is considered to be notable in the events including the death and state funeral of President Zia-ul-Haq and witnessing the general elections held in 1988 that saw Benazir Bhutto's becoming the Prime Minister of Pakistan, Soviet retreat from Afghanistan in 1989, and the normalization of foreign relations between Pakistan and Russia.

After the collapse of the Soviet Union in 1991, he was succeeded as Russian Ambassador to Pakistan and eventually retired from the diplomatic services in 1993.

During his tenure, he also successfully worked towards repatriation of Soviet soldiers held as POWs by the Afghan Mujaheedin and safely returning them to Soviet Union in 1989–91.

Yakunin died on 6 November 2025, at the age of 94.
