= Alexey Dedov =

Soviet-Russian diplomat

- Алексей Дедов

Ambassador Extraordinary and Plenipotentiary of Russia to Iran
- Incumbent
- Assumed office 8 September 2022
- President: Vladimir Putin
- Preceded by: Levan Dzhagaryan

Ambassador Extraordinary and Plenipotentiary of Russia to Pakistan
- In office 14 December 2013 – 11 April 2019
- President: Vladimir Putin
- Preceded by: Andrey Budnik
- Succeeded by: Danila Ganich

Personal details
- Born: 26 September 1960 (age 65)

Alexey Yurievich Dedov (Russian: Алексе́й Ю́рьевич Де́дов; born 26 September 1960) is a Russian diplomat who served as Ambassador of Russia to Pakistan between 2013 and 2019. He often penned articles in The Express Tribune since 2015.

== Biography ==
Dedov studied at Moscow State Institute of International Relations, graduating in 1982 and joining the Ministry of Foreign Affairs that year. He had several assignments both within the Foreign Ministry, and abroad with Russian diplomatic missions. From 2004 until 2009 he was the Deputy Head of Mission of the Russian Embassy in Iran. He then served as a Head of Division in the Second Asian Department from 2009 to 2010 and then as Deputy Director of the department from January 2010 until December 2013. From December 14, 2013 to April 11, 2019, he was appointed Ambassador Extraordinary and Plenipotentiary of Russia to the Islamic Republic of Pakistan and presented his credentials to President Mamnoon Hussain on 27 February 2014. He was relieved as ambassador on 11 April 2019. In 2019-2022 — Deputy Director of the Second Asia Department of the Russian Foreign Ministry. On 8 September 2022, he was appointed Ambassador Extraordinary and Plenipotentiary of Russia to Iran.

== Diplomatic rank ==
- Was given the rank of the Envoy Extraordinary and Plenipotentiary, 2nd class on 29 December 2006
- Was advanced to Envoy Extraordinary and Plenipotentiary, 1st class on 21 July 2015
