= 1972 visit by Zulfikar Ali Bhutto to the Soviet Union =

In March 1972, Zulfikar Ali Bhutto, president of Pakistan, visited the Soviet Union to help normalize formal relations between the two countries. Bhutto engaged in substantive discussions with Soviet leaders in Moscow, including meeting with Premier Alexei Kosygin and General Secretary Leonid Brezhnev.

Even before being elected on a socialist platform in 1971, Bhutto had spoken of the necessity of independent foreign policy and stronger relations with the Soviet Union, which had been fractured during the direct war with India and the Indo-Soviet Treaty.

The meeting was marked as a reconciliation between the states and as a restoration of industrial co-operation. It also signaled a wider shift towards an independent foreign policy, in particular to reduce Pakistan's dependence on the United States.

Held between 2–5 March 1972, the meeting also strengthened trade between the two states. Trade was increased from 36.2 million rubles (Рубль) to 92.3 million rubles. The repercussions of Bhutto's visit were vast, including the Pakistan Steel Mills (valued at ₨.4.5 billion) established in Karachi, the Guddo Thermal Power Plant, and Pakistan's official departure from the Southeast Asia Treaty Organization (SEATO) and the Central Treaty Organization (CENTO).

In 1974, Bhutto again visited Moscow as part of a goodwill mission, aimed at strengthening ties. That visit yielded mixed results: the Pakistan Steel Mills were established and inaugurated in 1985; however, closer ties with China, difficulties with India and Afghanistan, and the discovery of Soviet arms in the Iraqi embassy negatively impacted relations between Pakistan and Soviet Union. Relations between the two countries would quickly sour after Bhutto was deposed and executed by the pro-American General Zia ul Haq, who aligned Pakistan with the US in support of the Afghan Mujahideen to resist the Soviet invasion of Afghanistan in 1979–1988.

== See also ==
- List of international presidential trips made by Zulfikar Ali Bhutto

== Media archives ==
- "Z.A. Bhutto in Moscow 1972". PTV archives. 19 February 2014.
