= 1950 state visit by Liaquat Ali Khan to the United States =

First state visit of a Pakistan Head of Government to the USA

Liaquat Ali Khan, the prime minister of Pakistan, and his wife, Ra'ana Liaquat Ali Khan, paid a state visit to Washington, D.C. from 3 to 5 May 1950.

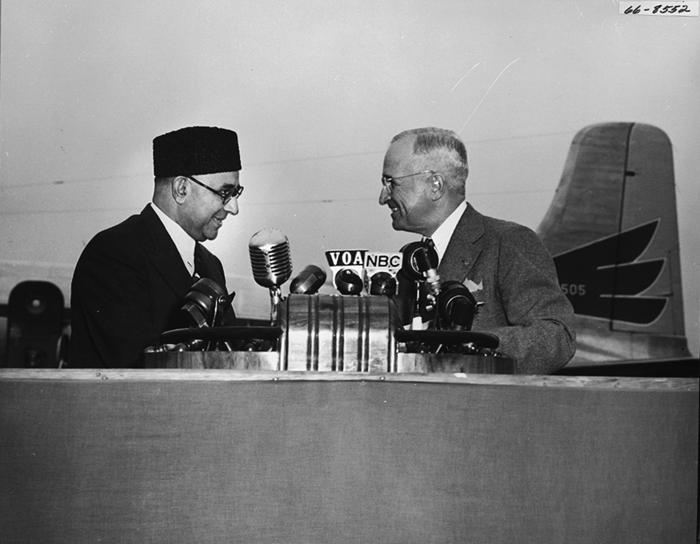
Prime minister Ali Khan shakes hands with President Harry Truman, upon his arrival.

US President Harry Truman had sent his personal aircraft, The Independence, to ferry the Pakistani prime minister from London to Washington, D.C., and accorded him the highest honour by personally welcoming him at the national airport, accompanied by his entire cabinet. A photograph from that time shows Truman and his wife smiling at the camera, surrounded his Pakistani guests and their wives in "Gharar" outfits in front of Blair House, the state guest house across the street from the White House. Liaqat Ali Khan was wearing a Western Suit with a "Jinnah" Karkuli cap.

Upon Prime Minister Ali Khan's arrival, there was an official parade in the New York City in his honour, he was also conferred with an honorary degree by the Columbia University. During his visit, he also spoke at the House of Representatives, the lower house of the United States Congress.

At home front, Prime Minister Ali Khan's trip to the United States was highly politicised and criticised by the left–wing sphere who levelled its charges on ignoring the Soviet Union's invitation in favour of the United States. Upon returning to Pakistan, Ali Khan spoke highly of his visit to the US but survived a conspiracy hatched by the left–wing sphere in 1951. According to the English newspaper, Dawn, Ali Khan's state visit and further reliance towards the United States became a permanent fixture of the foreign policy of Pakistan during the Cold War.

== Background ==
After the independence of Pakistan in 1947, the United States was one of the first countries to recognise the new State of Pakistan as US Department of State had rushed the US Consul-General in Morocco to Karachi to represent the US government in the Pakistan's Independence Day ceremony on 14 August 1947 with a message of warm greetings and good wishes from the White House.

The independence of Pakistan in 1947 oversaw the first war over Kashmir region. During the war, Founder of Pakistan and Governor-General Muhammad Ali Jinnah unsuccessfully asked the United States for $2 billion in military and financial aid but the US followed a policy of neutrality, rebuffing any requests made by Pakistan's government. During this time, Pakistan's relations with the USSR remained to be fluctuated. In 1949, Indian Prime minister Jawaharlal Nehru paid the state visit to the United States, which eventually led Pakistan's government to cement relations with the Soviet Union. Finally on 3 June 1949, Soviet Union sent an invitation to Prime Minister Ali Khan which came as a surprise to the United States. With India's strict commitment towards the Non-aligned Movement (NAM) influenced the United States to send an invitation to Ali Khan in 1950.

== Visit and aftermath ==
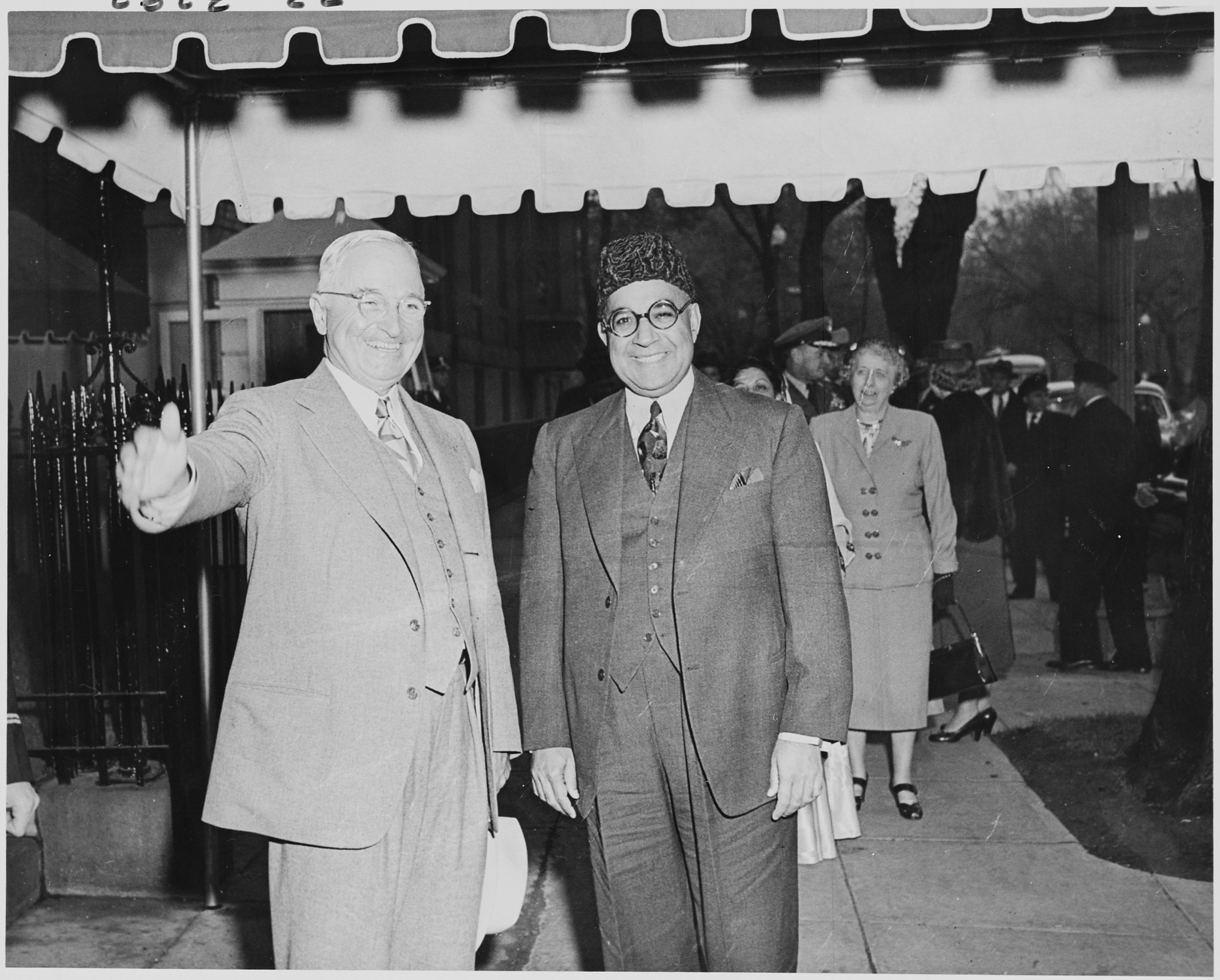
President Truman accompanies Prime Minister Ali Khan in Washington, D.C.

In a reference written by Kalim Bahadur in his book Democracy in Pakistan: Crises and Conflicts, Prime Minister Ali Khan quickly accepted the invitation and postponed his visit to Moscow. On 3 May 1950, Prime Minister Ali Khan, the First Lady of Pakistan, Begum Ali Khan and the large civic-military delegation arrived to the United States via United Kingdom and their official flight landed at the New Orleans Airport, New Orleans, Louisiana. Prime Minister Ali Khan was met with honour and received a warm welcome from the general American public; he was personally received by the President of the United States, Harry Truman. Upon reaching New York City, President Truman organised a parade and accorded the red-carpet treatment to welcome Ali Khan and his family.

Ali Khan gave a lecture on political science at Columbia University, which conferred him with an honorary degree. Thereafter, he also engaged and spoke to the US House of Representatives. Speaking at the United States Congress session, Ali Khan highlighted the importance of Pakistan's geostrategic location, and the visit set the course of Pakistan's foreign policy: close ties with the United States and co-operation against a perceived threat from the USSR. Upon returning to Pakistan, he strongly defended his trip to the United States in a broadcast from Radio Pakistan on 30 June:

This visit not only enabled me to see the American people and their wonderful country but also gave me an occasion to inform the inhabitants of that country about the birth of Pakistan, its short but eventful history and the Islamic way of life adopted as an ideal by the people of my country

— Prime Minister Liaquat Ali Khan, 1950, source

== Criticism and politicisation ==
At home front, Prime Minister Ali Khan was highly politicised and criticised by the left-wing sphere who charged him with ignoring the Soviet Union's initiation. However, Ali Khan counter-argued that the USSR had slowly extended the invitation and "were unable to fix a date to pay a state visit." Ali Khan's state visit and alignment towards the United States became a pivot in Pakistan's foreign policy during the Cold War. After the assassination of Ali Khan, the relations with the USSR soured until 1965 when the relations improved to such an extent that USSR sponsored the Tashkent Agreement between India and Pakistan.

In 1972, due to Prime Minister Zulfikar Ali Bhutto's rapprochement, visit led to normalise the relation after providing a help to finance the founding of Pakistan's largest industrial complex: Pakistan Steel Mills. In a critical assessment opinion written in English newspaper Dawn, Liaquat Ali Khan is chiefly responsible for throwing Pakistan into the US camp.

== Media gallery ==
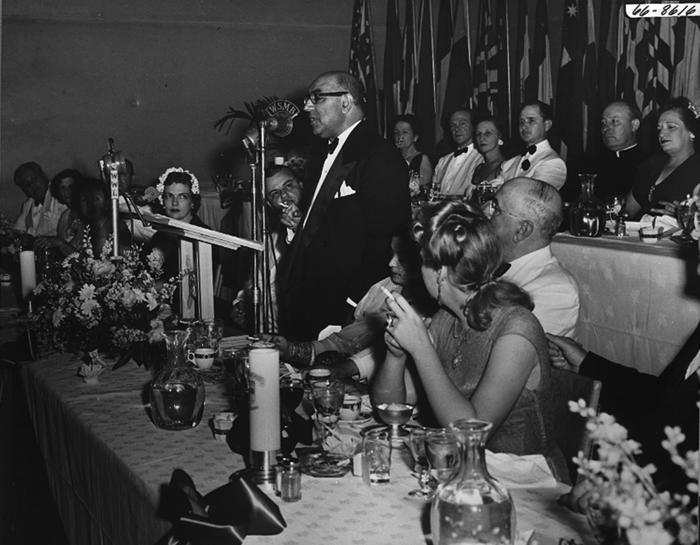
Prime Minister Ali Khan speaking with the American public.

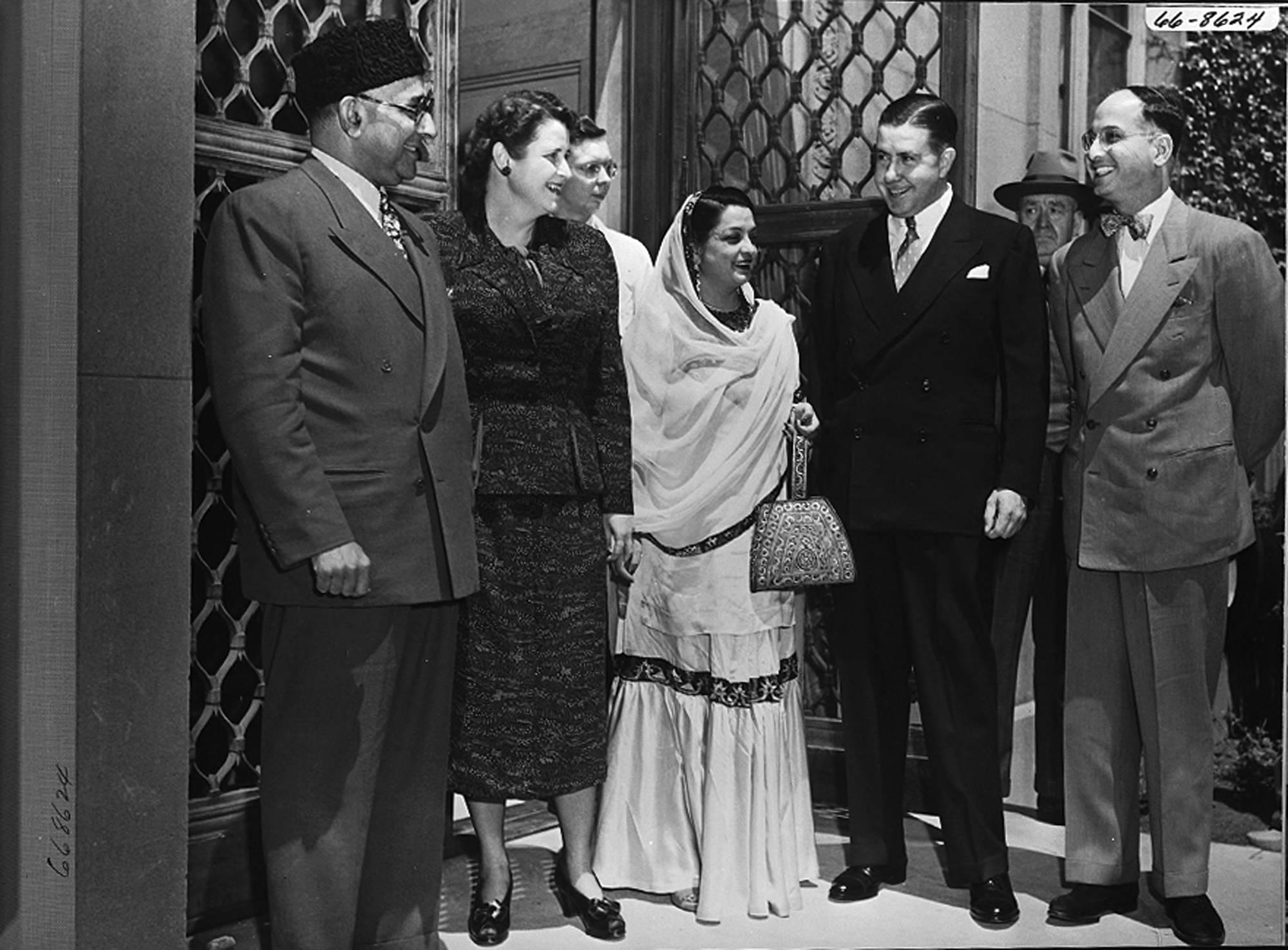
Prime Minister Ali Khan and First Lady Begum Ali Khan speaks with the faculty of MIT.

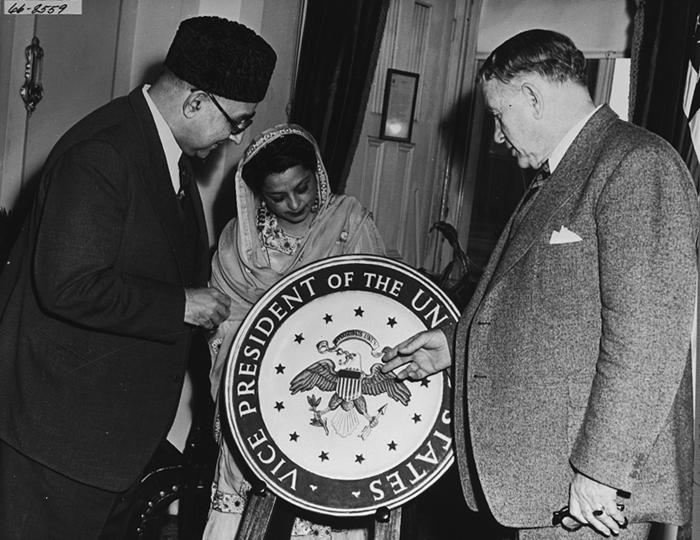
Vice-President Alben Barkley explains the 1948 version US Seal.
