= Akhlas Akhlaq =

Russian citizen convicted by Pakistani authorities

Akhlas Ahmed Akhlaq
- Akhlaq in his Russian passport photo
- Born: July 17, 1981; Volgograd
- Died: December 21, 2014 (aged 33); Faisalabad

Akhlas Ahmed Akhlaq (July 17, 1981 – December 21, 2014) was a Russian citizen who, in the year 2005, was convicted by Pakistani authorities in a plot to kill the then president and military chief, Pervez Musharraf. Akhlaq, his family and lawyer had denied the charge. Russian diplomats attached to the embassy in Islamabad claimed that Akhlaq was denied counsellor support or any contact with them.

== Background ==
Akhlas Akhlaq was a Russian citizen born in the Soviet city of Volgograd in 1981 to a Russian mother and a Pakistani father of Kashmiri ethnicity. He moved to Pakistan as an adult to help his father with his business. On the way there, he along with his brother, stopped in Tashkent, the capital of Uzbekistan. Once there, they were short of money and their father contacted the Pakistani ambassador, who was a friend of his to lend them some money. They also applied for a Pakistani visa at the embassy. They arrived in Karachi, Pakistan in March 2001 and stayed with their father there.

== Arrest and execution ==
More than two years later in December 2003, Akhlas disappeared in a district in Azad Kashmir and was reportedly arrested by members of the Pakistani military intelligence. His father alleged that he was told by an intelligence agent that he would risk compromising his sons safety if he reported his sons conditions.

Other rumours had surfaced on the Internet that he attempted to evade arrest and was pursued by Rangers up till the Russian embassy and took refuge there while the Rangers surrounded the embassy, until he came out.

Akhlaq was charged in a military court and found guilty of terrorism in an alleged attempt to murder Pervez Musharraf. His mother claimed to have lost all contact with him in 2001. His execution was postponed as the death penalty has been suspended under former president Asif Zardari's era. But following the 2014 Peshawar school massacre, it was restored under the current Prime Minister Nawaz Sharif and Akhlaq was shortly later executed in a jail in the Pakistani city of Faisalabad. The execution was shortly postponed until his mother arrived in Pakistan and so that he could meet his parents before he would be put to death. His mother claimed that her son was charged and executed "for nothing" and no evidence has been provided at all for his involvement in the assassination attempt.

Dawn News later reported that the body of the executed Akhlaq had gone missing for about two days before being found. Following the execution and lack of evidence presented to support the verdict, the Russian Foreign Ministry claimed that it would work in the future to prevent the execution of its citizens abroad. The Russian embassy in Islamabad also stated that they regretted that Pakistani officials failed to inform them their decision to proceed with the death sentence against the accused individual. It was also rumored that a Russian delegation's visit to Pakistan had been snubbed over the Pakistani government's refusal to respond to the embassy's pleas to allow consular access and assistance to the individual's case.
