= List of international presidential trips made by Zulfikar Ali Bhutto =

This is a list of international presidential trips made by Zulfikar Ali Bhutto, the 4th President of Pakistan.

== 1972 ==
Country	Date/s	Engagements	Ref.
Afghanistan	11 January	Unscheduled five-hour visit to Kabul for talks with King Zahir Shah.	
Iran	24–30 January	Bhutto's 10,000-mile goodwill tour of Muslim countries following the 1971 war. Bhutto broadcast his Eid message from Tripoli while on tour.	
Turkey	24–30 January	Bhutto's 10,000-mile goodwill tour of Muslim countries following the 1971 war. Bhutto broadcast his Eid message from Tripoli while on tour.	
Morocco	24–30 January	Bhutto's 10,000-mile goodwill tour of Muslim countries following the 1971 war. Bhutto broadcast his Eid message from Tripoli while on tour.	
Tunisia	24–30 January	Bhutto's 10,000-mile goodwill tour of Muslim countries following the 1971 war. Bhutto broadcast his Eid message from Tripoli while on tour.	
Algeria	24–30 January	Bhutto's 10,000-mile goodwill tour of Muslim countries following the 1971 war. Bhutto broadcast his Eid message from Tripoli while on tour.	
Libya	24–30 January	Bhutto's 10,000-mile goodwill tour of Muslim countries following the 1971 war. Bhutto broadcast his Eid message from Tripoli while on tour.	
Egypt	24–30 January	Bhutto's 10,000-mile goodwill tour of Muslim countries following the 1971 war. Bhutto broadcast his Eid message from Tripoli while on tour.	
Syria	24–30 January	Bhutto's 10,000-mile goodwill tour of Muslim countries following the 1971 war. Bhutto broadcast his Eid message from Tripoli while on tour.	
China	31 January – 2 February	State visit to Beijing; held talks with Chairman Mao Zedong and Premier Zhou Enlai.	
Soviet Union	16–18 March	Three-day visit to Moscow aimed at easing post-war tensions and reopening talks with the Soviet leadership.	
Kuwait	May–June	Bhutto's second Middle East and Africa tour.	
United Arab Emirates	May–June	Bhutto's second Middle East and Africa tour.	
Iraq	May–June	Bhutto's second Middle East and Africa tour.	
Lebanon	May–June	Bhutto's second Middle East and Africa tour.	
Jordan	May–June	Bhutto's second Middle East and Africa tour.	
Saudi Arabia	May–June	Bhutto's second Middle East and Africa tour.	
Somalia	May–June	Bhutto's second Middle East and Africa tour.	
Ethiopia	May–June	Bhutto's second Middle East and Africa tour.	
Sudan	May–June	Bhutto's second Middle East and Africa tour.	
Nigeria	May–June	Bhutto's second Middle East and Africa tour.	
Guinea	May–June	Bhutto's second Middle East and Africa tour.	
Mauritania	May–June	Bhutto's second Middle East and Africa tour.	
Turkey	May–June	Bhutto's second Middle East and Africa tour.	
Iran	May–June	Bhutto's second Middle East and Africa tour.	
India	28 June – 3 July	Attended the Simla Summit; met Prime Minister Indira Gandhi and concluded the Simla Agreement.	

== 1973 ==
Country	Date/s	Engagements	Ref.
Iran	10–14 May	Five-day state visit to Tehran; welcomed by the Shah and Prime Minister Amir-Abbas Hoveyda.	
Turkey	12 July	Two-hour stopover in Istanbul en route to Rome; visited the Topkapi Museum.	
Italy	13–16 July	Private visit to Rome.	
United Kingdom	23–24 July	Official visit to London; met Prime Minister Edward Heath and also held a 90-minute meeting with the Shah of Iran.	
France	25 July	Official visit to Paris; met President Georges Pompidou at the Élysée Palace.	
