= Guddu, Pakistan =

Town in Sindh, Pakistan

Guddu گڈو
- Town
- Location in Sindh, Pakistan Guddu (Pakistan)
- Coordinates: 28°25′51″N 69°41′15″E
- Country: Pakistan
- Province: Sindh
- District: Kashmore District

Population (2017)
  - Total: 24,516
- Time zone: UTC+5 (PST)

Guddu is a town in Sindh, Pakistan located about 10 km from Kashmore in the district of Kashmore, 650 km north of Karachi. Population of this town is 24,516 per 2017 Census of Pakistan.

Vast reservoirs of natural gas were discovered at Sui, Balochistan in 1953 to pave the way for the development of a gigantic power system at Guddu, Sindh.

Discovery of the natural gas and construction of a barrage across Indus River has transformed Guddu, Sindh, Pakistan into a modern town. The gas from Sui Gas Field has made it possible to develop Pakistan's one of the largest thermal generation complex Guddu Thermal Station. Plants for the construction of first phase of Guddu Power Project took off in 1969. The Guddu Thermal Power Station can generate 2400+ Megawatts but it's only generating less than half of its production limit.

Guddu Thermal Power Station has 10 wards and 300+ employees

The repercussions of 1972 Bhutto visit to Soviet Union were vast; including the ₨. 4.5 billion worth Steel Mills in Karachi; the thermal power plant in Guddu; and Pakistan's official departure from Southeast Asia Treaty Organization (SEATO) (1955 - 1977) and Central Treaty Organization, also called Baghdad Pact (CENTO) (1955 - 1979).

== See also ==
- Guddu Thermal Station
- Guddu Barrage
