= Andrey Budnik =

Russian diplomat (1953–2018)

Andrey Sergeyevich Budnik (Russian: Андрей Серге́евич Будник; 2 February 1953 – 10 August 2018) was a Russian diplomat who was an Ambassador of Russia to Pakistan from 2009 until 2013.

After graduating from the Moscow State Institute of International Relations in 1975, Budnik joined the diplomatic corps in 1978.

From 1978 to 1984, Budnik was the Attaché, Third Secretary at the Soviet embassy in New Delhi. After returning to Moscow, Budnik returned to India in 1988 as First Secretary, Counsellor in the Soviet Embassy.

From 1995 to 1999 Budnik was the consul-general of Russia in Mumbai. He returned to Moscow in 2000, where he gained the position of deputy director general of the Second Asian Department at the Russian Ministry of Foreign Affairs, and held it until his first ambassadorial appointment, which came on 30 September 2008, when he was appointed by Russian president Dmitry Medvedev as Ambassador of Russia to Pakistan. Budnik presented his Letters of Credence to Pakistani president Asif Ali Zardari on 5 January 2009.

Budnik held the diplomatic rank of ambassador extraordinary and plenipotentiary 2nd-class.
