= Garbage Bin (cartoon strip) =

Garbage Bin is an Indian cartoon strip created in 2011 by Faisal Mohammed, which was first published as a webcomic on Facebook and later added to Instagram. It has amassed more than one million followers on Facebook.

Garbage Bin follows Guddu, a ten-year-old child in the 1990s, and depicts his middle-class life. Supporting characters include Guddu's best friend Shan and his teacher, classmates, and parents.

Guddu is inspired by cartoonist Faisal Mohammed, and Shan is inspired by his close friend and Garbage Bin Studios co-founder, Md. Shan Nawaz.
