= Guddu (film archivist) =

Pakistani film archivist

- گڈو
- Born: Zahid Guddu Khan; Karachi
- Occupation: Film archivist

Zahid Guddu Khan, or just Guddu, is a Pakistani film archivist from Karachi. He is the owner of Guddu Film Archive.

== Work ==
Coming from a Pathan family and residing in Karachi, Guddu has been collecting film-related material since his boyhood. Reportedly, he has more than 15000 old and rare Lollywood film posters, photographs, magazines, books, postcards, CDs, and audio cassettes in his personal collection from 1948 to 1990s. He also runs a YouTube channel Guddu Film Archive.

Guddu has exhibited his collection on several occasions. In 2016, the French cultural center Alliance Francaise de Karachi managed to display his collection to the general public. That exhibition was named "Filmistan".
