= Vitaly Smirnov =

Soviet diplomat

- Віталь Смірноў

Ambassador to Pakistan
- In office 11 July 1980 – 16 May 1985
- Preceded by: Sarvar Azimov
- Succeeded by: Abdurrahman Vazirov

Ambassador to Bangladesh
- In office 14 October 1988 – 21 March 1991
- Preceded by: Vladimir Belyayev
- Succeeded by: Yuri Alekseyev

Personal details
- Born: 16 February 1930 Sutoki, Lyozna district, Vitebsk region, Byelorussian SSR, Soviet Union
- Died: 1 November 2007 (aged 77) Minsk, Belarus

Vitaly Stepanovich Smirnov (Belarusian: Віталь Сцяпанавіч Смірноў, 16 February 1930 – 1 November 2007) was a Soviet and Belarusian diplomat. He served as the Soviet ambassador to Pakistan during the 1980s. His tenure was characterized by several notable events in Pakistan–USSR relations, including the Soviet–Afghan War and the Badaber uprising in Peshawar in 1985. Earlier, he was the Permanent Representative of Belarus to the United Nations (1967–1974).
