= List of ambassadors of Russia to Pakistan =

Ambassador of the Russian Federation to the Islamic Republic of Pakistan
- سفیر روسی وفاق کے لئے اسلامی جمہوریہ پاکستان
- Emblem of the Ministry of Foreign Affairs of Russia
- Incumbent; Albert Khorev since 10 November 2023
- Ministry of Foreign Affairs (Russia)
- Style: His Excellency, The Honorable
- Status: Chief of Russian Diplomatic Mission to Pakistan
- Reports to: Minister of Foreign Affairs (Russia)
- Residence: Embassy of Russia in Islamabad
- Seat: Islamabad
- Nominator: The president of Russia
- Appointer: State Duma
- Formation: 22 November 1949
- First holder: Ivan Bakulin
- Deputy: Vladimir L. Berezyuk (Deputy Head of Mission)
- Website: https://pakistan.mid.ru

The ambassador extraordinary and plenipotentiary of the Russian Federation to Pakistan is the official representative of the president and the government of the Russian Federation to the president and the government of Pakistan.

The ambassador and his staff work at large in the Embassy of Russia in Islamabad. There is a consulate general in Karachi, and an honorary consul is based in Lahore.

The post of Russian ambassador to Pakistan is currently held by Albert Khorev, incumbent since 10 November 2023.

== History of diplomatic relations ==
Diplomatic relations were established on an embassy level on 1 May 1948, when the Soviet embassy was opened in Karachi, the then capital of Pakistan. The first ambassador, Ivan Bakulin, was appointed on 22 November 1949. In August 1960 the capital of Pakistan was moved to the newly founded city of Islamabad, where the embassy is now based.

== List of representatives (1949–present) ==
=== Soviet Union to Pakistan (1949–1991) ===
Name	Title	Appointment	Termination	Notes
Ivan Bakulin	Ambassador	22 November 1949	13 February 1950	
Aleksandr Stetsenko	Ambassador	13 February 1950	20 January 1956	
Ivan Shpedko	Ambassador	20 January 1956	15 February 1960	
Mikhail Kapitsa	Ambassador	15 February 1960	23 November 1961	
Aleksey Nesterenko	Ambassador	28 November 1961	6 August 1965	
Mikhail Degtyar	Ambassador	6 August 1965	29 May 1971	
Aleksei Rodionov	Ambassador	29 May 1971	5 December 1974	
Sarvar Azimov	Ambassador	5 December 1974	11 July 1980	
Vitaly Smirnov	Ambassador	11 July 1980	16 May 1985	
Abdurrahman Vazirov	Ambassador	16 May 1985	12 July 1988	
Victor Yakunin	Ambassador	12 July 1988	25 December 1991	

=== Russian Federation to Pakistan (1991–present) ===
Name	Title	Appointment	Termination	Notes
Victor Yakunin	Ambassador	25 December 1991	29 April 1993	
Aleksandr Alekseyev	Ambassador	29 April 1993	18 September 1998	
Andrey Gulyaev	Ambassador	18 September 1998	4 December 1999	
Eduard Shevchenko	Ambassador	8 June 2000	12 July 2004	
Sergey Peskov	Ambassador	12 July 2004	30 September 2008	
Andrey Budnik	Ambassador	30 September 2008	14 December 2013	
Alexey Dedov	Ambassador	14 December 2013	11 April 2019	
Danila Ganich	Ambassador	11 April 2019	10 November 2023	
Albert Khorev	Ambassador	10 November 2023		
