= Guddu Thermal Power Station =

Thermal Power Station in Pakistan

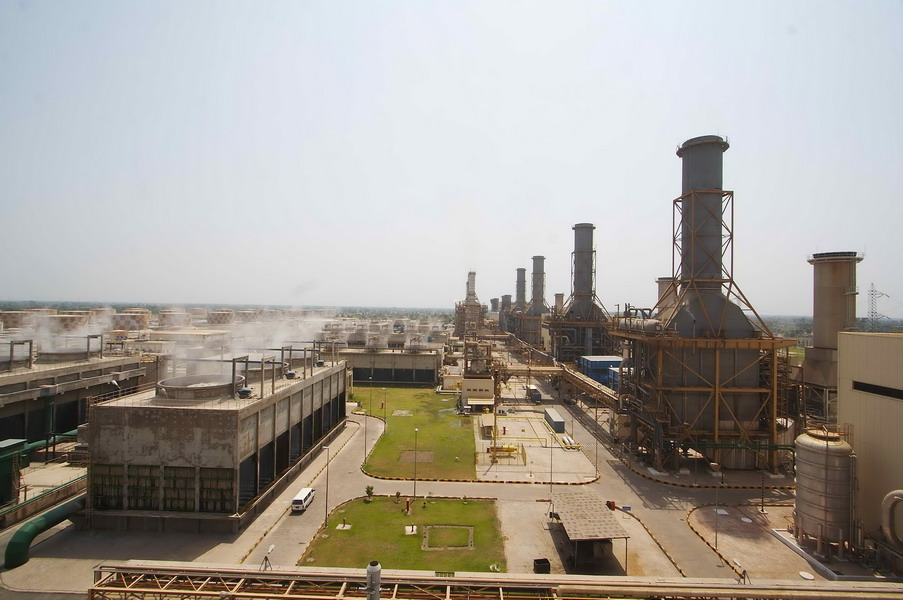
- Country: Pakistan
- Location: Guddu, Sindh, Pakistan
- Coordinates: 28°25′30.2″N 69°42′04.9″E

Thermal power station
- Primary fuel: Natural gas
- Secondary fuel: Furnace oil
- Turbine technology: Combined Cycle gas turbine (CCGT)

Power generation
- Units operational: Units 5-6: 600 MW; Units 11-13: 415 MW; Units 14-16: 747 MW
- Nameplate capacity: 1,762 MW

External links
- Commons: Related media on Commons

The Guddu Thermal Power Plant, also known by other names such as Central Power Generation Company Limited, and GENCO-II, is a thermal power station located in Guddu, Sindh, Pakistan.

Built in the 1980s, the power plant was built with joint technical cooperation and financial assistance from the Soviet Union.

In April 2014, the then-Prime Minister Nawaz Sharif inaugurated commissioning of two gas turbines of 243 MW each.

As of 2017, the station had seventeen installed power units and its contribution to the national grid stood between 1,400 MW to 1,750 MW.

== See also ==
- List of power stations in Pakistan
- Guddu, Pakistan
- Guddu Barrage
