= Embassy of Russia, Islamabad =

Diplomatic mission of Russia in Pakistan

Embassy of Russia in Islamabad
- Location: Islamabad, Pakistan
- Address: Diplomatic Enclave, Sector 4
- Ambassador: Danila Ganich
- Website: Embassy of Russia in Islamabad

The Embassy of the Russian Federation in Islamabad is the diplomatic mission of Russia to Pakistan. The post of Russian ambassador to Pakistan is currently held by Danila Ganich, incumbent since 11 April 2019. There is a consulate general in Karachi, and an honorary consul is based in Lahore.

== Overview ==
The first Russian embassy was established in Karachi on 1 May 1948 with the beginning of diplomatic relations with Pakistan. In August 1960 the capital was moved from Karachi to Islamabad, with the embassy in Karachi becoming a consulate-general, while a new embassy was established in Islamabad.

== See also ==
- Russians in Pakistan
