= List of Russian Azerbaijanis =

This is a list of notable people of Russian Azerbaijani descent.

== List ==
Number	Name	Image	Background
1	Alexander Kasimovich Kazembek		orientalist
2	Amina Mirzoeva		streamer, singer
3	Asaf Zeynally		composer
4	Karim Mammadbeyov		politician
5	Shafiga Mammadova		cinema and theatre actress
6	Omar Eldarov		sculptor
7	Geydar Dzhemal		Russian Islamic revolutionist, philosopher, poet, political and social activist
8	Tofig Zulfugarov		former Azerbaijani foreign minister
9	Timur Rodriguez		showman, singer
10	Tamilla Abassova		racing cyclist, 2004 Olympic silver medalist
11	Aleksandr Samedov		football player
12	Ramiz Mamedov		retired football player
13	Emin Garibov		artistic gymnast
14	Georgiy Mamedov		diplomat, currently ambassador to Canada, until 2004 Deputy Foreign Minister of Russian Federation in charge of nuclear disarmament
15	Ramil Sheydayev		soccer player
16	Emin Makhmudov		soccer player
17	Vugar Orujov		wrestler, 1992 Olympic bronze medalist
18	Enver Mamedov		Soviet diplomat, a mass media manager
19	Farkhad Akhmedov		politician, businessman, founder of Northgas
20	Aras Agalarov		businessman, billionaire, founder of Crocus International
21	Emin Agalarov		businessman, singer and songwriter
22	Geidar Mamedaliyev		wrestler, 2004 Olympic silver medalist
23	Muslim Magomayev		singer
24	Ilgar Mammadov		fencer, olympics winner 1988 and 1996
25	Tahir Salahov		artist
26	Kerim Kerimov		part of the Soviet space program
27	Zafar Guliyev		wrestler, 1996 Olympic bronze medalist
28	Farman Salmanov		geologist who helped discover oil fields in Siberia
29	Rustam Ibragimbekov		screenwriter, Academy Award winner
30	Vagit Alekperov		President of the leading Russian oil company LUKOIL
31	Mirza Abdul'Rahim Talibov Tabrizi		intellectual and social reformer Iranian Azerbaijanis
32	Huseyn Khan Nakhchivanski		Cavalry General and General-Adjutant of the Emperor of Russia
34	Alexander Lvovich Kazembek		politician
35	Elmar Rajsur		singer
36	Chingis Izmailov		cognitive neuroscientist
37	Zaid Orudzhev		philosopher
38	Sabit Orujov		politician
39	Habibullah Huseynov		Soviet colonel and Hero of the Soviet Union
40	Khanum Velieva		freestyle wrestler
41	Jahid Afrail oglu Huseynli (Jony)		singer, songwriter
42	Sabi		singer, songwriter

== See also ==
- Azerbaijanis in Russia
- Azerbaijani diaspora
