= Elmar (given name) =

- Gender: Male
- Name day: 4 March (in Estonia)

Elmar is a male given name from different languages:

- In English, German, Estonian, and Faroese, it comes from a reconstructed Proto-Germanic word *Aþalamār meaning “noble” and “famous”.
- In Assyrian Aramaic, it is a modern name meaning “El is my lord” or “El is the lord”.

People named Elmar include:

- Elmar Altvater (1938–2018), German political scientist
- Elmar Bakhshiev (born 1980), Azerbaijani footballer
- Elmar Bolowich (born 1954), American soccer coach
- Elmar Borrmann (born 1957), German fencer
- Elmar Brandt (born 1971), German comedian
- Elmar Brok (born 1946), German politician
- Elmar Budde (1935–2025), German musicologist
- Elmar Díaz Solórzano (born 1969), Mexican politician
- Elmar Frings (1939–2002), German modern pentathlete
- Elmar Gasanov (born 1983), Ukrainian pianist
- Elmar Gasimov (born 1988), Azerbaijani judoka
- Elmar Geirsson (born 1948), Icelandic footballer
- Elmar Hess (born 1966), German artist
- Elmar Hörig (born 1949), German journalist
- Elmar Huseynov (1967–2005), Azerbaijani journalist
- Elmar Järvesoo (1909–1994), Estonian agricultural scientist and politician
- Elmar Kaljot (1901–1969), Estonian footballer
- Elmar Kits (1913–1972), Estonian painter
- Elmar Kivistik (1905–1973), Estonian sport shooter
- Elmar Klos (1910–1993), Czech film director
- Elmar Kraushaar (born 1950), German journalist and author
- Elmar Korko (1908–1941), Estonian rower
- Elmar Lampson (born 1952), German composer
- Elmar Ledergerber (born 1944), German politician
- Elmar Leppik (1878–1978), Estonian mycologist
- Elmar Lichtenegger (born 1974), Austrian hurdler
- Elmar Liitmaa (born 1970), Estonian guitarist and songwriter
- Elmar Lipping (1906–1994), Estonian politician
- Elmar Lohk (1901–1963), Estonian architect
- Elmar Lubbe, South African rugby league player
- Elmar Mäder (born 1963), Swiss military commander
- Elmar Magerramov (born 1958), Azerbaijani chess player
- Elmar Mammadyarov (born 1960), Azerbaijani politician and diplomat
- Elmar Muuk (1901–1941), Estonian linguist
- Elmar Oliveira (born 1950), American violinist
- Elmar Peintner (born 1954), Austrian artist
- Elmar Pieroth (1934–2018), German politician
- Elmar Rähn (1904–1996), Estonian track and field athlete
- Elmar Rajsur, Azerbaijani-Russian singer
- Elmar Reimann (1893–1963), Estonian long-distance runner
- Elmar Rojas (1942–2018), Guatemalan painter
- Elmar Saar (1908–1981), Estonian footballer and coach
- Elmar Salulaht (1910–1974), Estonian opera singer and actor
- Elmar Schmid (born 1947), Swiss clarinetist
- Elmar Seebold (born 1934), German philologist
- Elmar Tampõld (1920–2013), Estonian-Canadian architect
- Elmar Tepp (1913–1943), Estonian footballer
- Elmar Truu (born 1942), Estonian politician and sports pedagogue
- Elmar Valiyev (born 1960), Azerbaijani politician
- Elmar Wepper (1944–2023), German actor
- Theódór Elmar Bjarnason (born 1987), Icelandic footballer
