= Embassy of Russia, Ottawa =

Diplomatic mission of Russia to Canada

Embassy of the Russian Federation in Ottawa Посольство Российской Федерации в Оттаве Ambassade de la Fédération de Russie à Ottawa
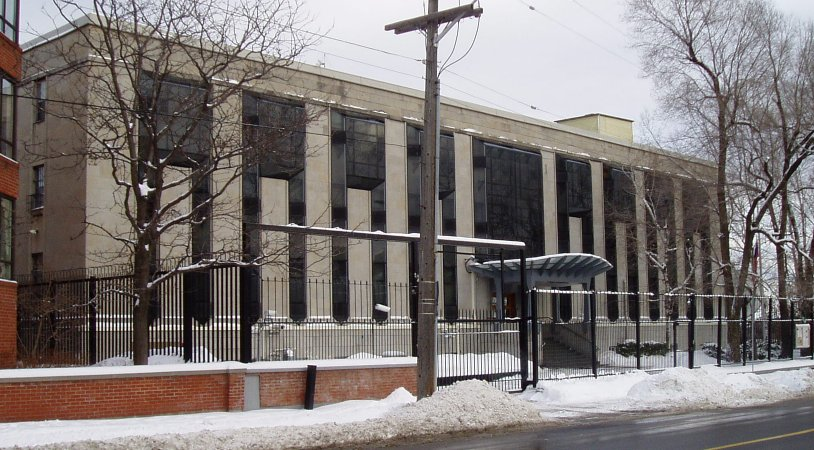
- Address: 285 Charlotte Street; Ottawa, Ontario; K1N 8L5
- Coordinates: 45.429800°N 75.673259°W
- Ambassador: Oleg Stepanov

The Embassy of Russia in Canada is the Russian embassy in Ottawa, Ontario, Canada, located at 285 Charlotte Street, at the eastern terminus of Laurier Avenue, built by W.E. Noffke. It looks out on Strathcona Park to the south, while to the east, it looks out on the Rideau River. Russia also maintains consulates in Toronto and Montreal.

== History ==
The site was originally given to the Soviet Union in 1942 and was contained in a large manor that had formerly belonged to J. Fred Booth, son of lumber baron J.R. Booth. This manor had been the site of the marriage of Fred Booth's daughter Lois to Prince Erik of Denmark, son of Prince Valdemar of Denmark. The building was expropriated by the government during the Second World War for use by the Royal Canadian Navy, but was instead handed over to the Soviets to house their growing legation. It was in this building that Igor Gouzenko worked and from where he removed documents before defecting in 1945.

On January 1, 1956, a fire broke out on the third floor of the embassy. Embassy employees tried to put it out themselves and did not call the fire department. They were unsuccessful and neighbours soon noticed smoke billowing from the building. When the fire department arrived the Soviets would not let them in, insisting they fight the fire from the sidewalk outside. Ottawa Mayor Charlotte Whitton arrived at the blaze and demanded the fire department be let in, and threatened to have the embassy staff arrested. The dispute between the mayor and the ambassador was mediated by cabinet minister Paul Martin, who had also come to the scene. Eventually, the firefighters were allowed in, but only after the Soviets had removed large numbers of sensitive documents and equipment. It was too late, however, and the building was gutted.

The remains of the manor were demolished and the current stark Classic Soviet style building was erected in its place. After the fire the embassy was relocated to 24 Blackburn Avenue, which housed the office of the Soviet commercial counsellor. The RCMP, then in charge of Canadian security service and in cooperation with MI5, infiltrated the construction site in an attempt to bug the building in an operation that was known as Operation Dew Worm.

With the fall of the Soviet Union, the building became the Russian embassy. The massive bust of Vladimir Lenin was removed from the lobby, and soon after the building's exterior was modified to make it less imposing.

In November 2022, the Russian Embassy got into a Twitter battle with three Canadian gay cabinet ministers over a 2022 Russian LGBTQ law. The Russian ambassador has claimed that Russia does not interfere in internal Canadian affairs.

=== Jeffrey Delisle espionage case ===
In July 2007, Jeffrey Delisle, a former Sub-Lieutenant in the Royal Canadian Navy walked into the Embassy of Russia in Ottawa and offered to sell secret information to the Russian military intelligence service; the GRU. He eventually passed on sensitive information from the top-secret STONEGHOST intelligence sharing network to Russia. Delisle continued handing over classified information to his GRU handler for 4 more years until December 2011 before being arrested in January 2012.

=== Russian invasion of Ukraine ===
On 1 March 2022, during the Russian invasion of Ukraine, the embassy claimed that The Russian army does not occupy Ukrainian territory and takes all measures to preserve the lives and safety of civilians, without providing evidence. The Embassy claimed that the responsibility for all civilian deaths during the Russian attack, called "Special Military Operation" in Kremlin-controlled media, was on the Ukrainian side. Former Canadian Foreign Affairs Minister Mélanie Joly has referred to claims from the Russian Embassy as "misinformation" and "propaganda".

== Soviet/Russian Ambassadors to Canada ==
- Georgy Zarubin 1941–1942
- Fedor Tarasovich Gusev 1942–1943
- Dimitri S. Chuvahin 1950s
- Boris Miroshnichenko ?-1973
- Alexander Nikolaevich Yakovlev 1973–1983
- Aleksei A. Rodionov 1983-?
- Vitaly Churkin 1998–2003
- Georgiy Mamedov 2003–2014
- Alexander Darchiev 2014–2021
- Oleg Stepanov 2021–present
