= Azerbaijanis in Russia =

Azerbaijanis in Russia Rusiya azərbaycanlıları Русија азәрбајҹанлылары
Total population
- 603,070 (Census 2010) – 1,500,000 (Estimate) to 3,000,000

Regions with significant populations
- Dagestan: 130,919
- Moscow (urban only): 57,123
- Tyumen Oblast: 43,610
- Moscow Oblast (excl. Moscow): 19,061
- Rostov Oblast: 17,961
- Stavropol Krai: 17,800
- Saint Petersburg (urban only): 17,717
- Krasnoyarsk Krai: 16,341
- Saratov Oblast: 14,868
- Volgograd Oblast: 14,398
- Sverdlovsk Oblast: 14,215
- Samara Oblast: 14,093

Languages
- Azerbaijani · Russian

Religion
- Predominantly Shia Islam

Related ethnic groups
- Azerbaijani diaspora

Azerbaijanis in Russia or Russian Azerbaijanis (Azerbaijani: Rusiya azərbaycanlıları (Latin), Русија азәрбајҹанлылары (Cyrillic); Russian: Азербайджанцы в России, Azerbajdzhantsy v Rossii) are people of Azeri descent in Russia. These may be either ethnic Azeris residents in the country or recent immigrants who profess Azeri ancestry.

Aside from the large Azeri community native to Russia's Dagestan Republic, the majority of Azeris in Russia are fairly recent immigrants. Azeris started settling in Russia (with the exception of Dagestan) around the late nineteenth century, but their migration intensified after World War II, and especially after the collapse of the Soviet Union in 1991. According to the 2010 All-Russian Population Census, there are 603,070 Azeris residing in Russia, however the actual numbers may be much higher due to the arrival of guest workers in the post-Soviet era. The estimated total Azeri population of Russia as of 2002 might have reached as many as 3,000,000 people, with more than one and half million of them living in Moscow, though in the following decade there was a tendency for many Azeris to move back to Azerbaijan. The majority of post-1991 ethnic Azeri migrants have come to Russia from rural Azerbaijan, Georgia and Armenia. Today most provinces of Russia have more or less significant Azeri communities, the biggest ones, according to official numbers, residing in Dagestan, Moscow, Khanty–Mansi, Krasnoyarsk, Rostov-on-the-Don, Saratov, Sverdlovsk, Samara, Stavropol, etc.

== Dagestan ==
As of 2010, 130,919 Azeris lived in the Dagestan Republic, which makes them the region's sixth-largest ethnic group and 4.5% of its total population. Most of them are natives of the city of Derbent living in the historical quarter Mahal and making up about one-third of the city's population. Azeris constitute 58% of the population of the Derbentsky District (more than 20 towns and villages), 18% of that of the Tabasaransky District 2.35% in the Kizlyarsky District (villages of Bolshebredikhinskoye and Persidskoye), 1.64% in the Magaramkent Rayon, and 1.56% in the Rutul Rayon. The rest live in the cities of Makhachkala, Khasavyurt, Buynaksk and Kizlyar.

Among cultural benefits, available to Dagestani Azeris, there are newspapers and magazines printed in the Azeri language, 72 public schools where Azeri is taught as a second language, and the Azeri Folk Theater in Derbent, founded in 1904. Historically Azeris of Dagestan were engaged in carpet weaving, currying, jewellery- and copper utensils making. Rural Azeris were occupied in farming. Most Azeris of Dagestan are Shia, although Sunni Muslims are found among the rural population.

In 2000, in a presidential decree, Azeris along with 13 other ethnic groups of Dagestan received the status of a native community of Dagestan. As of 2011, there are four Azeri members of the Dagestan State Council.

Beginning in 2014, the Azeri population of Derbent voiced its concern due to the government's indifference towards the poor state of infrastructure and frequent acts of vandalism and unauthorised removal of Azeri cultural landmarks in the city. These concerns led to protests and demands for a better representation at the municipal level. American political analyst Paul A. Goble characterised these events as "the boiling point" in the interethnic relations in Derbent and did not exclude the possibility of them leading to an ethnic conflict that would threaten to extend across the Russian–Azerbaijani border.

=== Azerbaijanis in Derbent ===
After the disintegration of the Caliphate, the city of Derbent and the surrounding area (currently the Derbent Rayon) became an independent emirate closely allied with the neighbouring state of Shirvan (present day northeastern Azerbaijan). During this period, the emirate became destination for the migration of numerous Turkic tribes. This factor, as well as the influence of the Seljuq Empire, ensured the spread of an Oghuz Turkic idiom in Derbent already in the eleventh century. The Mongol invasion put an end to the emirate's independence for the next two centuries. In the fifteenth century, Ibrahim I, who hailed from Derbent, became the new ruler of Shirvan and incorporated Derbent into Shirvan.

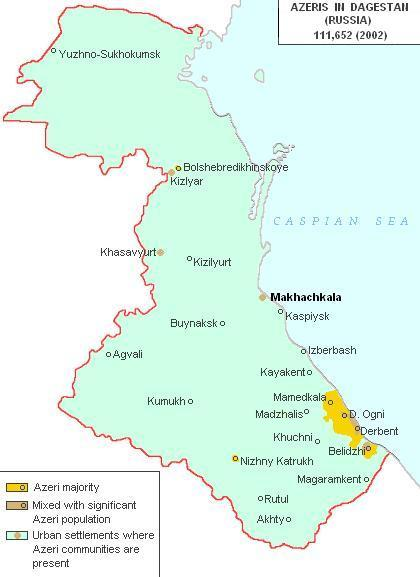
Map of Dagestan. Azerbaijani populated regions are shown in yellow

The ethnic make-up of Derbent remained unchanged until the city became part of the Safavid Empire in the early sixteenth century. The Safavid rule was characterised with active resettlement policies, aimed at securing Shia Muslim dominance in the conquered lands. In 1509, 500 Karamanli Turkic families from Tabriz settled in Derbent. An unknown number of Turkic-speakers from the Kurchi tribe were resettled her in 1540. Half a century later, 400 more families of the Turkic-speaking Bayat clan were relocated to Derbent on the orders of Abbas I. Finally, in 1741, Nadir Shah relocated Turkic-speakers from the Mikri clan to Derbent. By 1870 the settlers were all regarded as speaking a common language, Azeri. Due to their Shia adherence, the new migrants were referred to by contemporary historians as Persians (Russian: персияне), a term that was erroneously applied to Shia Azeris of Dagestan way into the twentieth century. Adam Olearius who visited the region around 1635 described Shirvan as a state of many peoples, all of whom, however, besides their own language, also spoke Turkic. At the time of Peter the Great's conquest of the Caspian coastline in 1722, the city of Derbent was predominantly inhabited by Azeris.

The northern part of the Derbent Rayon was historically populated by the Tarakama, a Turkic-speaking people akin to the Karapapak, who were sometimes classified as a separate ethnic group until the twentieth century. In Dagestan, they are also sometimes referred to as Padars. The Tarakama originated in various parts of Shirvan and were resettled by Khan Muhammad of Kaitag to the north of the city of Derbent around 1600. From then on, the area inhabited by them has been referred to as the Tarakama mahal (district) and constituted an administrative unit until the early twentieth century. The district included 10 villages. In 1736, around 300 Tarakama families from Kaitag advanced further across the Sulak River and settled on the Terek Valley in three villages, where they later mixed with the Kumyks. The rest gradually assimilated among Azerbaijanis and today for the most part consider themselves Azerbaijani. They are mainly Sunni and speak a variety of Azeri, close to the dialect of Shamakhy.

Such assimilation notably affected not only Turkic-speaking peoples of Dagestan. In the past, southern Dagestan had a large Tat population which originally spoke an Iranian language like other Tats. In 1866, they numbered 2,500 people and by 1929 lived in seven villages, including Zidyan, Bilgadi, Verkhny Chalgan, and Rukel. However, by the beginning of the twentieth century most of them had become Azeri-speaking and assumed Azeri identity in the later decades. Today, 16 out of 40 settlements in Derbent are majority-Azeri populated, and in nine more, Azeris constitute either a relative majority or a significant minority: Berikei, Delichoban, Velikent, Verkhny Chalgan, Nizhny Chalgan, Sabnova, Dzhemikent, Zidyan, Zidyan-Kazmalyar, Mitagi, Mitagi-Kazmalyar, Kala, Mugarty, Muzaim, Padar, Kommuna, Rukel, Tatlyar, Karadagly, Bilgadi, Belidzhi, Arablinsky, Arablyar, Gedzhukh, Chinar, Nyugdi, Rubas, Salik, Ullu Terekeme, Khazar, the town of Mamedkala.

Derbent was still a predominantly Azeri (called Transcaucasian Tatars in older Russian sources) town in 1897, with 9,767 persons constituting 66.7% of its population. Decades later, even though their numbers continued to grow, due to heavy immigration in the town, as of 2010, Azeris constituted just 32.3% of its total population with 38,523 persons.

=== Azerbaijanis in Tabasaran ===
In the historical region of Tabasaran, ethnic Azeris populate the left bank of the Rubas river. The growth and establishment of ethnic Azeris in this region has heavily depended on assimilation processes. In 1876, many Tabasarans were already in the process of switching from Tabasaran to Azeri as their first language. In addition, from the Middle Ages, the population of a number of villages in Tabasaran, namely Arablyar, Gimeidi, Darvag, Yersi, and Kemakh consisted of ethnic Arabs who were gradually being absorbed by the neighbouring population, mainly Azeri, such as in Yersi. In 1929, Kemakh was listed among Tat-populated villages, whereas Gimeidi (abandoned in 1976) was described as mixed Tat and Azeri. These Tats, in turn, were assimilated by Azeris in the following decades. Arablyar, which is now part of the Kurakh Rayon, currently has mixed Lezgin and Azeri population. Residents of Darvag retained the knowledge of Arabic as a first language until the 1930s, after which they also integrated linguistically and ethnically into the Azeri surrounding.

Currently ethnic Azeris constitute majority in the villages of Maraga, Hili-Pendzhik (including the settlement of Yekrag), Tsanak, Arak, Yersi, Darvag, and Zil. The villages of Arkit and Khurvek, as well the district capital Khuchni are mixed Azeri and Tabasaran. Azeris of Tsanak, Arak, Yersi, and Khuchni are normally bilingual in Azeri and Tabasaran, showing preference for Tabasaran when talking to their Tabasaran neighbours even if the latter know Azeri.

=== Azerbaijanis in Rutul ===
Nizhny Katrukh is the only Azeri village in the Rutul Rayon. Azeris of Nizhny Katrukh consider themselves descendants of the people of Shirvan who were captured by the mountaineers during one of their raids into the plains around 1700, taken to the Shamkhalate of Kazi-Kumukh (a Lak state of the time) and made subjects of the Shamkhal. According to a local legend, only two of the original seven settlers were Azeri, though it was the Azeri identity that came to dominate. The village today consists of seven quarters, populated by people of various waves of pre-Czarist immigration. Azeris of Rutul speak a distinct dialect of Azeri, which displays a heavy Lak substratum (despite general ethnic Rutul dominance in the district). The first newspaper in Rutul, Gizil Choban, established in 1932, was printed in Azeri.

=== Role of the Azerbaijani language and culture ===
For centuries Azeri has been the lingua franca of Southern Dagestan, used both to communicate with Azeris and with mountaineers whose languages were unrelated or considered unintelligible. In the sixteenth century, it became widespread in the Samur Valley and by the nineteenth century, the Azeri language spread across all of the foothill and lowland regions of Dagestan, and was one of the languages of trade and interethnic communication, along with Kumyk and Avar.

Historically the peoples of Southern Dagestan were oriented toward the cultural and behavioural norms of Azerbaijan, as well as depended on its economy. In the course of history, they found themselves almost fully immersed in the Azeri linguistic and cultural milieu. According to Dagestani anthropologist Magomedkhan Magomedkhanov, through the Azeri language, the people of this region "achieved material benefits, satisfaction of cultural needs, as well as creative and spiritual inspiration." Lezgian, Tabasaran, Rutul, and Aghul poets were creating poetry in Azeri already in the seventeenth century. Beginning in 1917, the works of Kumyk authors have displayed influences of Azeri literature. First plays in the amateur Lezgian theatre established in 1907 were performed in the Azeri language. Azeri music and singing traditions played a major role in the cultural integration of the peoples of Southern Dagestan. Music was performed through Azeri folk instruments, such as tar and kamancha and the Azeri mugham became a well-celebrated genre of music among the peoples of Dagestan. Lezgian music in particular shares many similar features with Azeri music. Azeri songs were played and performed at Tabasaran weddings as late as in the 1980s. According to Belarusian Jewish traveller Joseph Cherny, who visited the region in 1870, Mountain Jews of Dagestan had largely adopted Azeri cultural values and lifestyles, and even read liturgical prayers with a Tat translation and an Azeri tune. As for the Lezgian, Rutul, Tsakhur and other Nakh-Dagestani-speaking population, the Azeri language affected their cultural sphere and was a primary source for many loanwords, leaving their everyday speech behaviour mostly intact. The Tabasaran language is considered the most influenced by Azeri, which has contributed many nouns, adjectives, adverbs, verb forms and even auxiliary words and morphemes.

In 1861, the first secular school in Southern Dagestan opened in the Lezgian village of Akhty, and Azeri was taught there along with Russian. The learned masses preferred to use Arabic in formal communication, which is why in 1920, Arabic was chosen over the largely unwritten indigenous languages of Dagestan as a means of public education. The atheist policies of the Soviet government, however, attempted to eliminate religion from everyday life. Arabic soon became seen as a link between the Dagestanis and their Islamic heritage. Thus in 1923, Azeri became the language of education in all of Dagestan. According to Alibek Takho-Godi, Dagestani People's Commissar (minister) of Justice in the 1920s (himself of Dargwa origin), local Nakh-Dagestani languages were "not taken seriously as a means of nation-building due to their excessive number." Azeri retained its status until 1928, when education in other local languages, as well as in Russian, was introduced.

Azeri remained as the most popular second language in Southern Dagestan at least until the 1950s, spoken with various degrees of popularity as far north as in the Tindi villages of Tsumada. It is noteworthy that historically among Tindis and especially Aghuls, who lived relatively far from the Azeri settlements, usually only males spoke Azeri or any second language; and only those who visited the lowlands for seasonal labour. Beginning in the 1950s, the use of Azeri as a common second language and lingua franca has been in decline, as it could no longer compete with Russian. As of 2010, 13,648 Lezgians (2.93%), 5,665 Tabasarans (3.96%), 3,105 Avars (0.35%), and 1,379 Dargwa (0.24%) living in Russia claimed speaking Azeri, mostly as a second language (the figures in brackets indicate the percentage of the speakers of Azeri in relation to the overall ethnic population that reported language command). In Dagestan, the number of non-Azeri speakers of the Azeri language (as either a first or second language) was still in the thousands in 2010.

According to the Dagestani constitution, the official languages of Dagestan are Russian and "all local languages", though only 14 of the republic's numerous languages have writing systems, one of them being Azeri.

== Rest of Russia ==
Distribution of Azerbaijanis in Russia, 2010

Diplomatic missions and merchants from Shirvan and the Safavid Empire first appeared in Russia in the fourteenth and fifteenth century. Despite the Russian Empire conquering what is now Azerbaijan in the early nineteenth century and its incorporation into the Soviet Union in 1920, the Azeri population did not tend to leave its traditional areas of settlement until the second half of the twentieth century. However, isolated communities of Azeris in Russia can trace their existence to the mid-nineteenth century.

The population of maritime Caspian regions has historically had strong economic ties with the city of Astrakhan on the northern Caspian shore. Starting in the 1830, Azeri merchants began settling in this city, with three of them controlling up to 80% of commercial navy later in the century. Azeris, known to the local population as Persians or Shamakhy Tatars, numbered around one thousand persons in 1879. Azeri oil industrialist, first-guild merchant Shamsi Asadullayev, founder of the Asadullayev Trade Affairs, built an oil base not far from Astrakhan, in a settlement presently known as Asadullayevo. The Azeri community of Astrakhan grew in the Soviet times and in 2010 consisted of 5,737 people, making Azeris the fourth largest ethnicity in the oblast and 1.31% of its total population. The religious life of the Azeris in Astrakhan is centred around the 1909 Kriushi Mosque, which was closed down in 1932, and recently reopened and renovated as a Shiite mosque and named the Baku Mosque (by virtue of being located on Baku Street). The Azeri language is taught as a subject at the Astrakhan State University.

Shamsi Asadullayev was based in Moscow from 1903 until his death in 1913. He allocated money for the construction of a secular school for Muslim boys and girls and a Muslim community centre in Moscow. The four-story building erected after his death on Maly Tatarsky Lane came to be known as the Asadullayev House. It is currently owned by the Tatar National Cultural Autonomy of Moscow.

Similarly to all Muslims of the Caucasus and Central Asia, Azeris were exempt from compulsory military service in the Russian Imperial army, but were required to pay a special tax. Those willing to serve were allowed to enlist in irregular units, such as the Savage Division. At the same time, there was no restriction for Azeris (and other Muslim subjects of the Russian Empire) to be trained as officers. In 1805, Mammad Hasan agha Javanshir became one of the first Russian major generals of Azeri origin. Ethnic Azeri officers commanded Russian troops in a series of wars, including the Russo-Persian wars of 1804–1813 and 1826–1828, Russo-Turkish wars of 1828–1829 and 1877–1878, the suppression of the Hungarian Revolution of 1848, the Crimean War, the Caucasian War, and the Russian conquest of Central Asia.

In 1905, Azeri political figures were among those who established the first Islamic party of Russia, Ittifaq al-Muslimin, in the city of Nizhny Novgorod. An Azeri member, lawyer Alimardan Topchubashov, was elected its leader. The party was officially registered in 1908. There were six ethnic Azeris elected in the State Duma of the Russian Empire in the 1906 Russian legislative election, six more in the February 1907 election and one in each of the following elections.

In the decades following World War II, Azeris have played significant a role in developing Russian economy. Azerbaijani geologist Farman Salmanov, who later established himself in Moscow, discovered rich oil reserves in Siberia which had previously been considered as an unlikely oil-bearing region. Surgut International Airport, the third busiest airport in Western Siberia, was renamed after Salmanov following online voting. With many of them involved in entrepreneurship, Azeris have been employed in major economical areas, such as trade and oil industry. Among Russia's 100 richest people ranked by Forbes in 2004, three ethnic Azeris were ranked 10, 66 and 74.

Azeris have established numerous cultural communities, the largest one being the All-Russian Azeri Congress and the Azeri Federal National Culture Autonomy, which control smaller communities across Russia. In addition, the Moscow Public Secondary School No. 157 is set up for students with keen interest in the Azeri language and culture.

A 2005 study indicated noticeable social differences between two groups of Azeris: those who are native to or have lived considerable parts of their lives in Moscow and those who are recent immigrants. About half of the people in the first group have a post-secondary degree, whereas among immigrant Azeris only 25% do. Fluency in the Russian language is characteristic of virtually all of those in the first group (moreover, 24% of Azeris from this group reported it as their first language), while almost one-third of those in the second group speak very limited Russian. About half of Azeri newcomers are engaged in commerce and service sector, compared to the native and earlier immigrant Azeris who tend to pursue careers in sciences, health care, education and the arts.

In general, among ethnic Caucasus diasporas in Moscow, Azeris stand out as the least integrated into Russian society. They have been described as the strongest adherents to their traditions and marriages within their own ethnic community compared to local Armenians, Georgians, Ukrainians, and Tatars. According to a 2006 survey, 71% of Moscow Azeris described themselves as being religious. A great number of them have retained Azerbaijani citizenship and is willing to relocate back to Azerbaijan at some point. The 2010 Russian census saw a decrease in the number of Azeris in Russia compared to the previous census, with 603,070 Azeris (with 21.7% of them in Dagestan) compared to 621,840 in 2002 (with 18% in Dagestan). Over 97% of Azeris living in Russia know the Russian language. Close to 84% considers Azeri their first language. Among Azeris of Dagestan, the number of speakers of Azeri as a first language is over 99%.

== Discrimination ==
Azeris in the Russian Federation have faced discrimination, although racial conflict has had a rapid decline since 2008.

On 29 June 2025, Azerbaijan's Ministry of Culture canceled all Russian-related cultural events nationwide in response to the deaths of two Azerbaijanis in police custody in Yekaterinburg.

== Noble families ==
- Milyukov

== Azerbaijanis of Russia ==
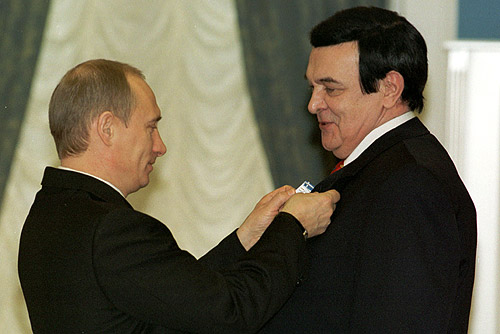
Muslim Magomayev was a Soviet and Azerbaijani baritone operatic and pop singer.

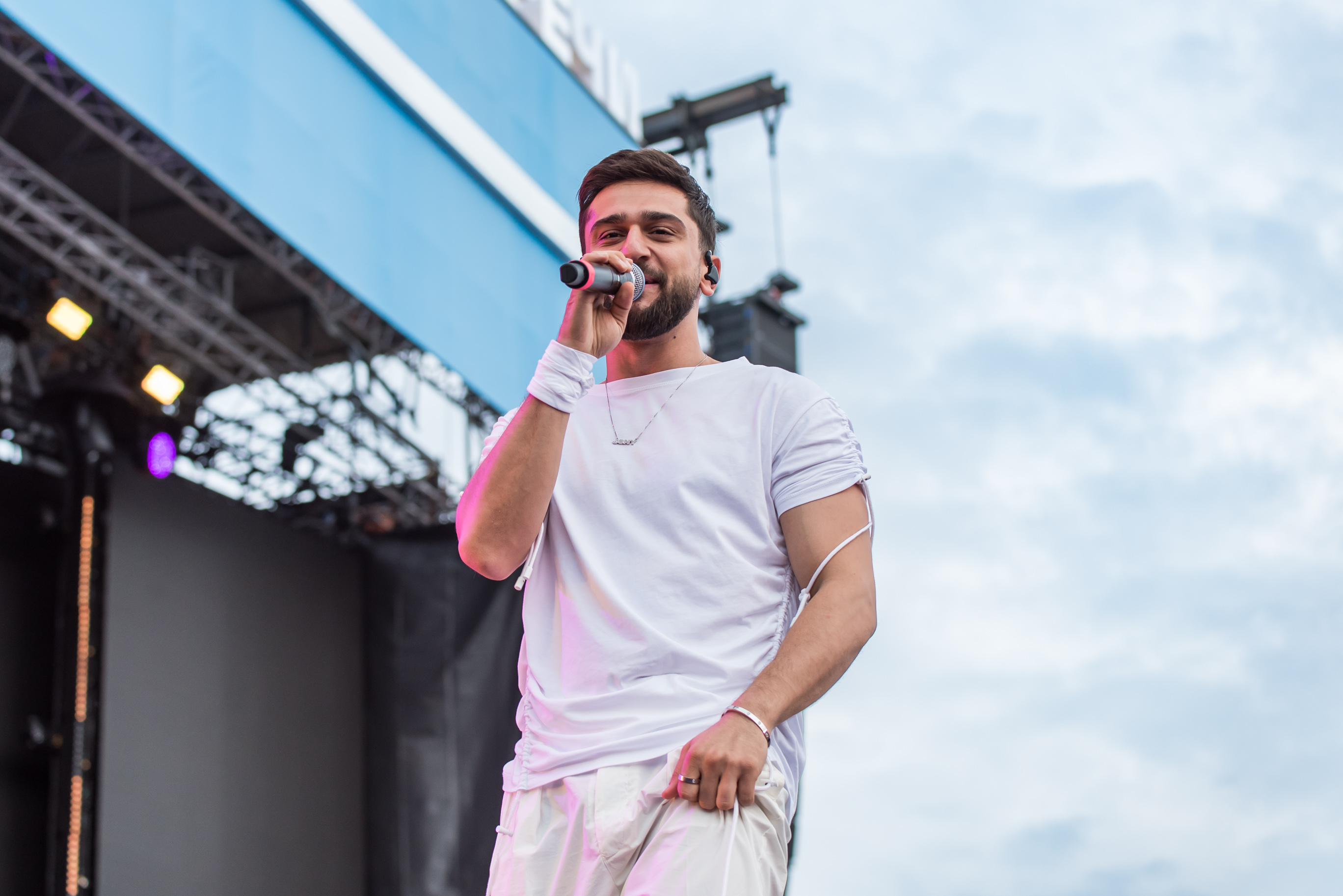
Azerbaijani-Russian singer Jony at the VK Fest in Russia, July 2022

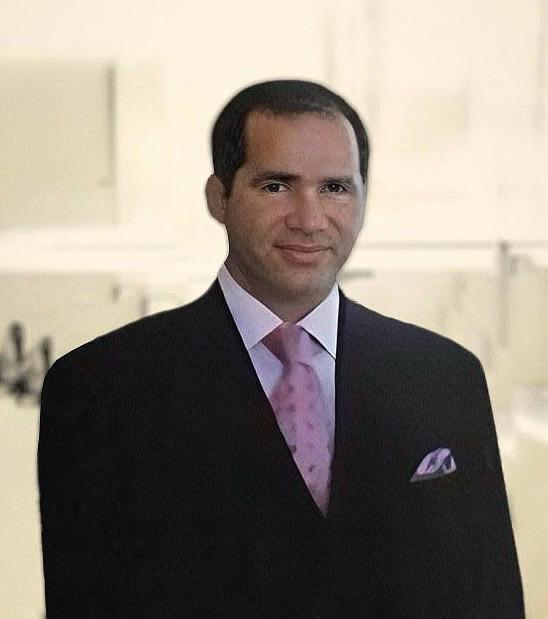
Azerbaijani-Russian businessman Farkhad Akhmedov was caught in a scandalous phone call leak in 2023, where he obscenely criticized Putin over the war in Ukraine

- Tamilla Abassova, racing cyclist, 2004 Olympic silver medalist
- Geydar Dzhemal, philosopher
- Emin Garibov, artistic gymnast
- Ruslan Gasimov, judoka
- Murad Hüseynov, football player
- Stalic Khankishiev, chef, photographer, cooking writer
- Georgiy Mamedov, diplomat, currently ambassador to Canada
- Ramiz Mamedov, retired football player
- Karim Mammadbeyov, revolutionary and early Soviet politician
- Timur Rodriguez, showman, singer
- Aleksandr Samedov, football player
- Ramil Sheydayev, football player
- Tofig Zulfugarov, former Azerbaijani foreign minister

Azerbaijanis born elsewhere

- Aras Agalarov, businessman, billionaire, founder of Crocus International
- Emin Agalarov, businessman, singer and songwriter
- Farkhad Akhmedov, politician, businessman, founder of Northgas
- Vagit Alekperov, President of the leading Russian oil company LUKOIL
- Avraamy Aslanbegov, Russian admiral
- Zafar Guliyev, wrestler, 1996 Olympic bronze medalist
- Habibullah Huseynov, Soviet colonel and Hero of the Soviet Union
- Rustam Ibragimbekov, screenwriter, Academy Award winner
- Alexander Kazembek, 19th-century Russian linguist and scholar
- Kerim Kerimov, part of Soviet space program
- Muslim Magomayev, singer
- Emin Makhmudov, football player
- Enver Mamedov, Soviet diplomat, mass media manager
- Tahir Mamedov, TV host, entertainer, actor, comedian and singer
- Ilgar Mammadov, fencer, Olympics winner 1988 and 1996
- Heydar Mammadaliyev, wrestler, 2004 Olympic silver medalist, world champion
- Musa Manarov, cosmonaut, flight engineer on Soyuz TM-4
- Huseyn Khan Nakhchivanski, Cavalry General and General-Adjutant of the Emperor of Russia
- Vugar Orujov, wrestler, 1992 Olympic bronze medalist
- Farman Salmanov, geologist who first discovered oil fields in Siberia
- Tahir Salahov, artist
- Mirza Abdul'Rahim Talibov Tabrizi, intellectual and social reformer

== See also ==
- Azerbaijani people
- List of Russian Azerbaijanis
- Armenians in Russia
- Iranians in Russia
- Turks in Russia
- Azerbaijan–Russia relations
- Russians in Azerbaijan
- Demographics of Russia
- Dagestan
- Dagestani Azerbaijanis
