= Edgar V. Saks =

Estonian historian and author

Edgar Valter Saks

Edgar Valter Saks (January 25, 1910 Tartu – April 11, 1984, Montreal) was an Estonian amateur historian and author. He was the Estonian exile government's minister of education in exile from 1971 until his death.

His book The Estonian Vikings: a Treatise on Finno-Ugric Viking Activities describes the ancient history of Estonians and other Finnic peoples living on the shores of the Baltic Sea. His etymological works provide information about hypothetical extensive prehistoric Estonian settlement in Northern Europe. In Esto-Europa, Saks finds Baltic-Finnic influences in several regions of Europe. Constructing Estonian etymologies for many toponyms (incl. Warsaw and Sumer), Saks reasoned there must have been extensive prehistoric Finnic influence not only in Europe, but also in neighbouring regions. His works, often based on outdated or incorrect sources, have been characterised as pseudohistory. Linguist Urmas Sutrop has referred to him as "fantasiser and author of pseudoscientific history books".

== Works in English ==
- Aestii (Montreal-Heidelberg, 1960)
- Esto-Europa (Montreal-Lund, 1966)
- Commentaries on the Liber Census Daniae (Montreal-Ann Arbor, 1974)
- The Estonian Vikings (London-Montreal, 1981)

Preceded by Elmar Järvesoo	Estonian Minister of Education; 1971–1984	Succeeded by Johan Ungerson
