= Bangladesh–Russia relations =

- Bangladesh: Russia

Diplomatic mission
- Embassy of Bangladesh, Moscow: Embassy of Russia, Dhaka

Envoy
- Saiful Haqoue: Alexander Grigoryevich Khozin

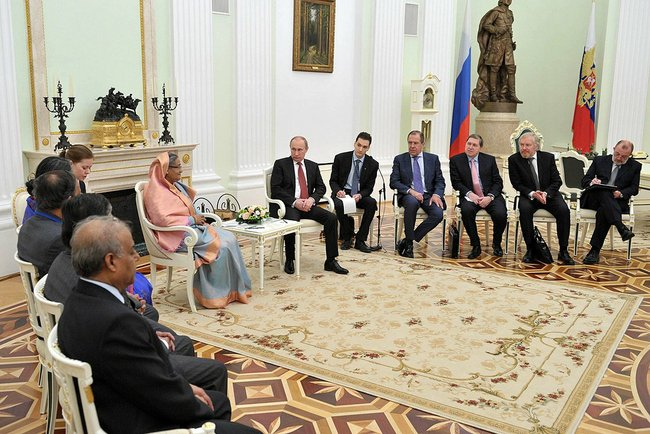
2013 Russia–Bangladesh summit in Moscow, being attended by the Bangladeshi prime minister Sheikh Hasina and the Russian president Vladimir Putin

Bangladesh–Russia relations (Bengali: বাংলাদেশ–রাশিয়া সম্পর্ক; Russian: Российско-бангладешские отношения) refers to the bilateral relations between the People's Republic of Bangladesh and the Russian Federation. Diplomatic relations between the Union of Soviet Socialist Republics (USSR) and Bangladesh were established on 25 January 1972. These relations have continued with Russia being the successor state to the Soviet Union. Bangladesh has an embassy in Moscow and Russia has one in Dhaka and a consulate-general in Chittagong.

The relations date back to 1971 Bangladesh Liberation War, where Soviets supported the Bangladesh Forces, and dispatched nuclear armed carriers to the Indian Ocean to resist American intervention. Following the independence of Bangladesh, Soviet authorities helped the government of Bangladesh in the reconstruction of the country and state apparatus. However, the relationship deteriorated after 1975, when the successive civil–military regimes of Bangladesh aligned themselves with the Western bloc and China throughout the Cold War. Bangladesh opposed the Soviet intervention to Afghanistan and boycotted the 1980 Moscow Olympics.

Following the dissolution of the Soviet Union, Bangladesh normalized its ties with Russia and continued bilateral relations. Currently, Russia is a major contributor to the energy and defence sector of Bangladesh, while Bangladesh is the second largest trading partner of Russia in South Asia.

== Bangladesh–Soviet Union relations ==
=== Bangladesh Liberation War (1971) ===
The Soviet Union had been a strong supporter of the Mukti Bahini during the Bangladesh Liberation War in 1971, and provided extensive aid, recognising that Bangladesh's independence would weaken the position of its rivals – the United States and China. In November 1971, the Ambassador of the Soviet Union to Pakistan, Aleksei A. Rodionov, directed a secretive message (Rodionov message) that ultimately warned Pakistan that it will be "embarking on a suicidal course if it escalates tensions in the subcontinent". On 6 and 13 December, the Soviet Navy dispatched two groups of cruisers and destroyers, armed with nuclear missiles from Vladivostok, to trail the United States' Task Force 74 in the Indian Ocean from 18 December until 7 January 1972. The Soviets also had a Ballistic missile submarine to ward off the threat posed by the USS Enterprise task force in the Indian Ocean.

=== Post-Independence relations (1972–1991) ===
Relations with the Soviet Union were cordial in the years immediately following independence. The Soviet Union supported Indian actions in aiding the war of independence, and after the war the Soviet Navy sent a floating workshop to Bangladesh for clearing Pakistani mines from the Chittagong and Chalna harbours. After independence, the newly formed Bangladesh Air Force received a significant donation from the Soviet Union. Among the aircraft delivered were ten single-seat Mikoyan-Gurevich MiG-21MFs and two twin-seat Mikoyan-Gurevich MiG-21UMs. In March 1972, Bangladeshi Prime Minister Sheikh Mujibur Rahman visited Moscow, in part to thank the Soviet state for their support for Bangladeshi liberation movement in 1971.

After the 1975 coup in Bangladesh, relations with the Soviet Union rapidly cooled. The civil-military regimes of Ziaur Rahman and Hussain Muhammad Ershad deemphasized socialist policies and vied for closer ties with the United States, Muslim World, and China — all of which were politically distant from the Soviet Union. Bangladesh condemned Soviet support for 1978 Vietnamese military intervention in Cambodia, and Bangladesh also strongly opposed the 1979 Soviet military intervention in Afghanistan along with other Western and Muslim nations. Bangladesh was one of the 60 countries that boycotted the 1980 Moscow Olympics. A low point in Bangladeshi–Soviet relations came after the expulsion of nine Soviet diplomats from Dhaka in December 1983 and January 1984 by the military rule of Ershad.

In 1989, the Soviet Union ranked 14th among aid donors to Bangladesh. The Soviets focused on the development of electrical power, natural gas and oil, and maintained active cultural relations with Bangladesh. They financed the Ghorasal thermal power station, the largest in Bangladesh.

== Since 1991 ==
Since the dissolution of the Soviet Union, Russian Federation continued the relations with Bangladesh as its successor state.

=== State visits ===
In 2009, Bangladeshi Prime Minister Sheikh Hasina visited St. Petersburg and met Russian President Vladimir Putin. In January 2013, Hasina again met Putin in Moscow.

=== Energy cooperations ===
In 2012, the two countries signed two key Memoranda of Understanding (MoU) which would further facilitate collaboration between the two countries in developing the nuclear power sector in Bangladesh. Russia is funding Rooppur Nuclear Power Plant in Bangladesh with the step of providing electricity to whole of Bangladesh.

=== Defence cooperations ===
Russia conducted a military sales effort in Bangladesh and succeeded with a $124 million deal for eight MIG-29 fighter jets.

=== Bilateral trade ===
Bangladesh is the second largest trade partner of Russia in South Asia. Despite Western sanctions on Russia over the Russian invasion of Ukraine, Bangladeshi–Russian trade remains above $2 billion between 2022 and 2024. Russia mainly exports machinery and agricultural products to Bangladesh, while Bangladesh generally exports ready-made garments and textile products to Russia.

=== Human trafficking ===
Since the start of Russian war on Ukraine, external volunteers could end up in the war. Many Bangladeshis could also end up joining the war, mostly because of fraud agencies, coercion and human trafficking. Till 2026, Over 100 Bangladeshis were send to fight the war in Ukraine while 34 Bangladeshis have already died in the war in Ukraine since 2022.. Reports say several Bangladeshis who could go to fight in the war was trafficked by using pilgrimage visas as cover.

== See also ==
- Foreign relations of Bangladesh
- Foreign relations of Russia
- List of Ambassadors of Russia to Bangladesh
