= Orujov =

Orujov, Orujev or Orudzhev (Azerbaijani: Orucov, Russian: Оруджев) is an Azerbaijani masculine surname, its feminine counterpart is Orujova, Orujeva or Orudzheva. It may refer to

- Egor Orudzhev (born 1995), Russian racing driver
- Hidayat Orujov (born 1944), Azerbaijani politician and writer
- Rustam Orujov (born 1991), Azerbaijani judoka
- Sabit Orujov (1912–1981), Azerbaijani politician
- Vugar Orujov (born 1971), Azerbaijani-Russian wrestler
- Zaid Orudzhev (born 1932), Azerbaijani-born Russian historian
