= Alexander Darchiev =

Russian diplomat (1960–2026)

- Александр Дарчиев
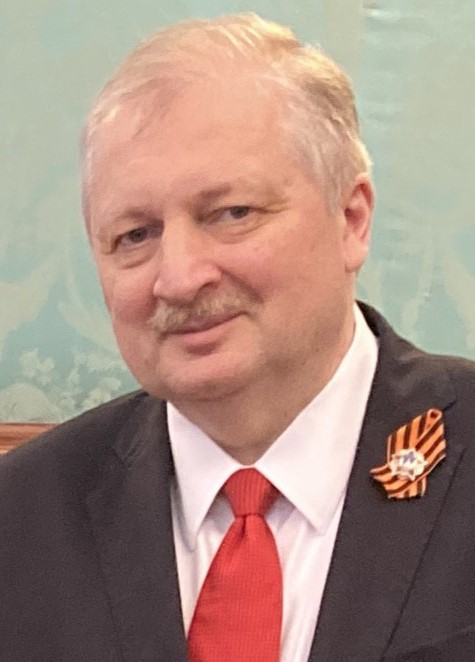
- Darchiev in 2025

Russian Ambassador to the United States
- In office 6 March 2025 – 11 November 2026
- President: Vladimir Putin
- Preceded by: Anatoly Antonov
- Succeeded by: TBD

Russian Ambassador to Canada
- In office 24 October 2014 – 11 January 2021
- President: Vladimir Putin
- Preceded by: Georgiy Mamedov
- Succeeded by: Oleg Stepanov

Personal details
- Born: 13 May 1960 Budapest, Hungary
- Died: 11 November 2026 (aged 66) Moscow, Russia
- Education: Moscow State University

Alexander Nikitich Darchiev (Russian: Александр Никитич Дарчиев; 13 May 1960 – 11 November 2026) was a Russian diplomat and historian who was the Russian ambassador to the United States from 2025 until his death in 2026. He previously served as ambassador to Canada from 2014 to 2021.

== Early life and education ==
Alexander Darchiev was born on 13 May 1960 to the family of a diplomat in Hungary. He studied history at Moscow State University Faculty of History, graduating in 1983, and learned to speak fluent English and French. Darchiev was a fellow at the Institute for US and Canadian Studies at the Soviet Academy of Sciences during the 1980s, before joining the Russian Foreign Ministry in 1992, just after the dissolution of the Soviet Union. He worked in its North America Department for his entire career.

== Diplomatic career ==
Darchiev was the head of a section in the North America Department of the Foreign Ministry in the mid-1990s, before he became an advisor at the Russian Embassy in Washington, D.C. In 2003 he was made the Deputy Director of the North America Department. He later served as the deputy chief of mission of the Russian Embassy to the U.S. from 2005 to 2010 with the rank of minister-counselor. Darchiev was the Director of the North America Department from 2010 to 2014, before serving as the Russian Ambassador to Canada from 24 October 2014 to 11 January 2021. Since 2016 he held the Russian civil service rank of Ambassador Extraordinary and Plenipotentiary. Following his tenure as ambassador to Canada, he again served as the Director of the North America Department.

After Anatoly Antonov was relieved of his duties as ambassador to the United States in October 2024, the following month it was reported that Darchiev has been nominated for the role, though he was not officially confirmed.

On 27 February 2025, six weeks after the beginning of Trump's second presidency, Darchiev led the Russian delegation in talks between the United States and Russia that took place in Istanbul, Turkey, which were a continuation of the earlier negotiations in Riyadh, Saudi Arabia. They discussed the restoration of Russia–United States relations, including by removing restrictions on their embassies. At the meeting, the U.S. delegation gave a note to the Russian side accepting Darchiev's appointment as Russian ambassador to the United States. The following day, the Russian Foreign Ministry announced that Darchiev had been named ambassador after his nomination was accepted by the U.S. government. He was formally appointed by President Vladimir Putin on 6 March 2025 per presidential decree № 121. Darchiev arrived in Washington, D.C. on 26 March 2025 and informally presented his credentials to the Department of State the following day. He presented his credentials to President Donald Trump on 11 June.

In December 2025, Darchiev declined an invitation to testify before the United States Senate at a hearing concerning Russia's abduction and forced transfer of Ukrainian children.

== Views ==
Darchiev issued strong denunciations of the United States and the West prior to being named ambassador.

After the 2022 full scale invasion of Ukraine, Darchiev called the war a "necessary measure", echoing Russian disinformation about the "genocide of Russian speakers in Ukraine" as justification.

In 2025, after becoming ambassador, he was in favor of direct flights from Russia to the United States.

== Death ==
Darchiev died in Moscow on 11 November 2026, at the age of 66. Foreign ministry spokesperson Maria Zakharova said that he had died following an unspecified chronic illness.

== Awards ==
- Order of Honour (30 December 2022)
- Order of Friendship (23 August 2019)
- Russian Federation Presidential Certificate of Honour (2018)

Diplomatic posts
| Preceded by Anatoly Antonov | Russian Ambassador to the United States; 6 March 2025 – 11 November 2026 | Succeeded by TBD |
