= Enver Mamedov =

Soviet media manager and diplomat (1923–2023)

- Ənvər Məmmədov (Azerbaijani); Энвер Мамедов (Russian)
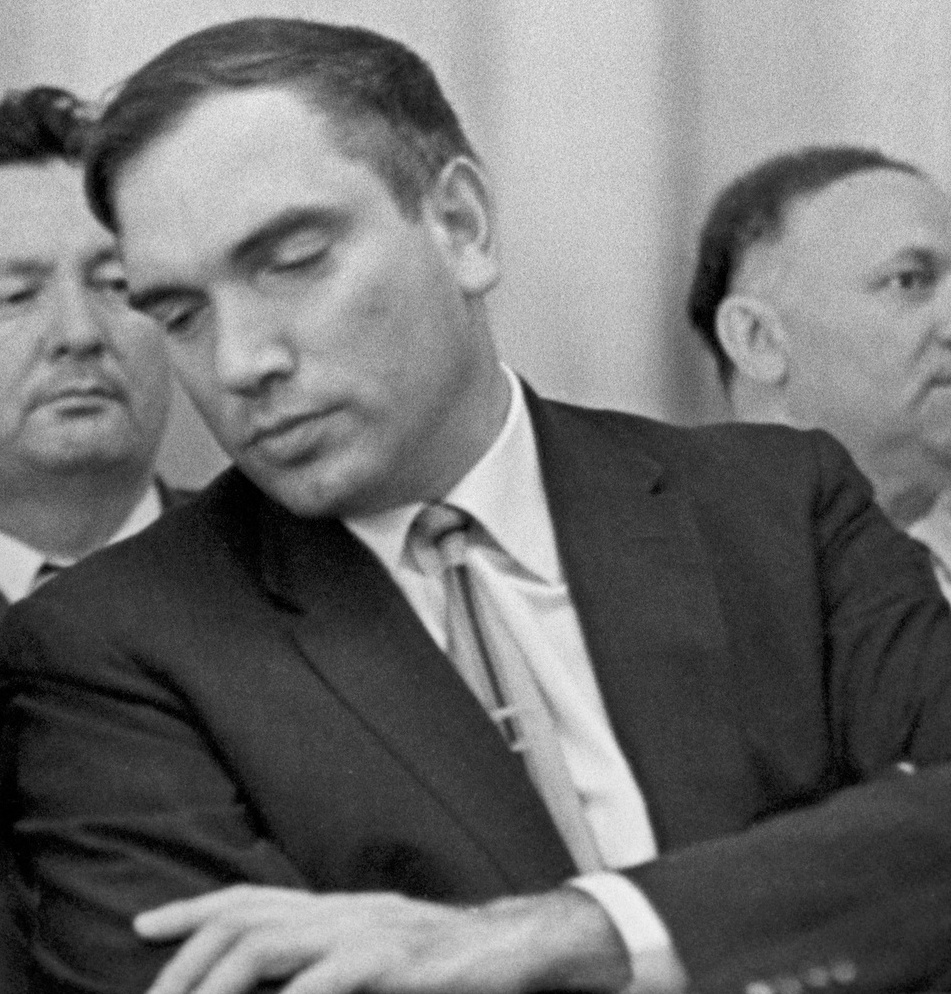
- Mamedov in 1966
- Born: 15 August 1923; Baku, Azerbaijani SSR, Transcaucasian SFSR, Soviet Union
- Died: 7 September 2023 (aged 100); Moscow, Russia
- Other names: Enver Ivanov (pen name (occasionally); Enver Nazimovich Mamedov (Russianized)
- Occupations: Diplomat; mass media manager
- Family: Georgiy Mamedov (son); Tatiana Mamedov (granddaughter)
- Awards: Medal of the Order "For Merit to the Fatherland"; Medal of Zhukov; Order of Friendship of Peoples; Order of the October Revolution; Order of the Red Banner of Labour

Enver Nazim oglu Mammadov (Azerbaijani: Ənvər Nazim oğlu Məmmədov; 15 August 1923 – 7 September 2023) was a Soviet diplomat and a mass media manager. During his career, spent mostly in Russia and the West, he was primarily known under the Russianized form of his name, Enver Nazimovich Mamedov (Russian: Энвер Назимович Мамедов), or just Enver Mamedov.

== Early life ==
Enver Mamedov was born on 15 August 1923 in Baku, Azerbaijan SSR. Mamedov's mother's maiden name was Ivanov, and he occasionally used it as his pen name during his media career.

After graduating from high school in Baku with the "excellent" grades in all subjects (including the Azerbaijani and German languages), in June 1941, Enver Mamedov joined a fighter pilot school. After Hitler's invasion of the USSR in 1941, Enver asked to be sent to the front line, but was instead sent to be trained as a military translator at a GRU school. After seeing some action first as a Sr. Sergeant, later as a Sr. Lieutenant, at the Soviet Union's Caucasus Front, Mamedov was sent to work with the USSR Commissariat for Foreign Affairs, where he was posted to the Soviet embassy in Italy as the press secretary. According to Mamedov himself, he was probably selected to that position because he spoke Italian, in addition to German, English, and French.

After the end of the war, Mamedov participated in the Nuremberg trials, as one of the handlers of the Soviet prosecutors' star witness, Field Marshal Friedrich Paulus.

== The nation's publicist ==
=== Broadcasting and publishing ===
Beginning about 1950, and for the rest of his life, Mamedov worked in Soviet mass media. In 1950–56 he was one of the officials in charge of the Soviet radio broadcasting to the UK, US, and Latin America.

In the late 1950s, Mamedov edited The USSR, a Soviet English-language magazine intended for a US audience – the Soviet counterpart of the Amerika magazine. He also visited the US on a number of public relations missions.

=== Media management ===
Enver Mamedov was appointed the Deputy Chairman of the State Committee for Radio and Television in 1962, and occupied this post from the late days of Nikita Khrushchev administration and throughout the Leonid Brezhnev era. Together with Alexander Yakovlev, he is credited with the creation in August 1964 of Radio Mayak, a national news and music radio broadcasting channel meant to compete with the Western radio stations broadcasting to Russia. From 1970 to 1985, he was directly in charge of Soviet television, being second in command to the Gosteleradio chief Sergey Lapin.

At the time of his 85th birthday in 2008, Enver Mamedov still was an adviser to the Director General of RIA Novosti.

== Personal life and death ==
Enver Mamedov's son, Georgiy Mamedov, is a Russian diplomat, who served as Russia's ambassador to Canada between 2003 and 2014. Through him, he has a granddaughter, Tatiana Mamedova, who is an artist, film costume and fashion designer living in Moscow.

Mamedov died on 7 September 2023, at the age of 100.
