= Georgy Zarubin =

Soviet diplomat

- Георгий Зарубин
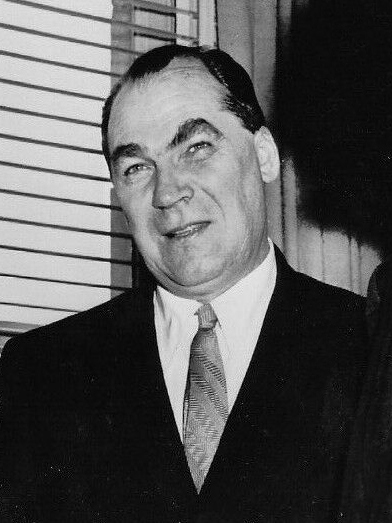
- Zarubin in 1956

Ambassador of the Soviet Union to Canada
- In office 23 March 1944 – 28 September 1946
- Preceded by: Fedor Gusev
- Succeeded by: Nikolai Belokhvostikov

Ambassador of the Soviet Union to the United Kingdom
- In office 28 September 1946 – 13 June 1952
- Preceded by: Fedor Gusev
- Succeeded by: Andrei Gromyko

Ambassador of the Soviet Union to the United States
- In office 14 June 1952 – 7 January 1958
- Preceded by: Alexander Panyushkin
- Succeeded by: Mikhail A. Menshikov

Personal details
- Born: 6 May 1900 Golitsino, Serdobsky Uyezd, Saratov Governorate, Russian Empire
- Died: 24 November 1958 (aged 58) Moscow, Russian SFSR, Soviet Union
- Education: Moscow State Textile University
- Profession: Civil servant, politician
- Awards: Order of the Patriotic War; Order of the Red Banner of Labour; Medal "For Valiant Labour in the Great Patriotic War 1941–1945"

Georgy Nikolayevich Zarubin (Russian: Георгий Николаевич Зарубин, 6 May 1900 – 24 November 1958) was a Soviet diplomat. He was Soviet Ambassador to Canada (1944–46), United Kingdom (1946–52) and United States (1952–58). Before that he headed the Industrial Academy in 1931–1935.

== Commemoration ==
In 1966, a street in Penza was named after G. N. Zarubin, formed by merging the former Obvodnaya and Mirnaya streets.
