= Russian Life =

Magazine about Russian culture

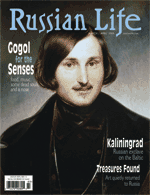
- A 2009 issue of Russian Life magazine
- Editor: Paul E. Richardson and Maria Antonova
- Frequency: Bimonthly
- First issue: October 1956
- Company: Russian Information Services
- Country: United States
- Based in: Montpelier, Vermont
- Language: English
- Website: russianlife.com
- ISSN: 1066-999X

Russian Life, previously known as The USSR and Soviet Life, is a 64-page color bimonthly magazine of Russian culture. It celebrated its 60th birthday in October 2016. The magazine is written and edited by American and Russian staffers and freelancers. While its distant heritage is as a "polite propaganda" tool of the Soviet and Russian government, since 1995 it has been privately owned and published by a US company, Storyworkz, Inc.

== History ==
Enver Mamedov (right) presents the USSR magazine on CBS (1957)

In October 1956, a new English language magazine, The USSR, appeared on newsstands in major US cities. Given the level of anti-communist sentiment at the time, it would hardly have seemed an auspicious name under which to launch such a magazine title. The publication was edited by Enver Mamedov (born 1923), a polyglot native of Baku, who had the distinction of being one of the youngest Soviet diplomats when he was appointed the press secretary of the Soviet Embassy in Italy in 1943, and who had been the handler of the Soviet prosecutors' star witness, Friedrich Paulus, at the Nuremberg trials.

Meanwhile, at newsstands in Moscow, Leningrad, Kiev and other Soviet cities, Amerika magazine made its second debut. Amerika had been inaugurated in 1944, but in late 1940s the State Department began to feel that radio and the Voice of America would be more effective propaganda tools and, in 1952, publication of Amerika was suspended. However, in 1956, the American and Soviet governments agreed to exchange magazines and Amerika was reborn and published in return for distribution of The USSR in the United States.

The simultaneous appearance of these magazines was the result of an intergovernmental agreement, one among several cross-cultural agreements designed to sow trust amidst the rancour of international politics. Still, there was never any question in anyone's mind that each magazine was intended as a propaganda tool for the government issuing and publishing it.

A few years later, The USSR changed its name to Soviet Life. While never a blatant Soviet propaganda tool, Soviet Life did hew to the government line. Yet it sought to present an informed view of Russian culture, history, scientific achievements and the various peoples inhabiting the Soviet Union.

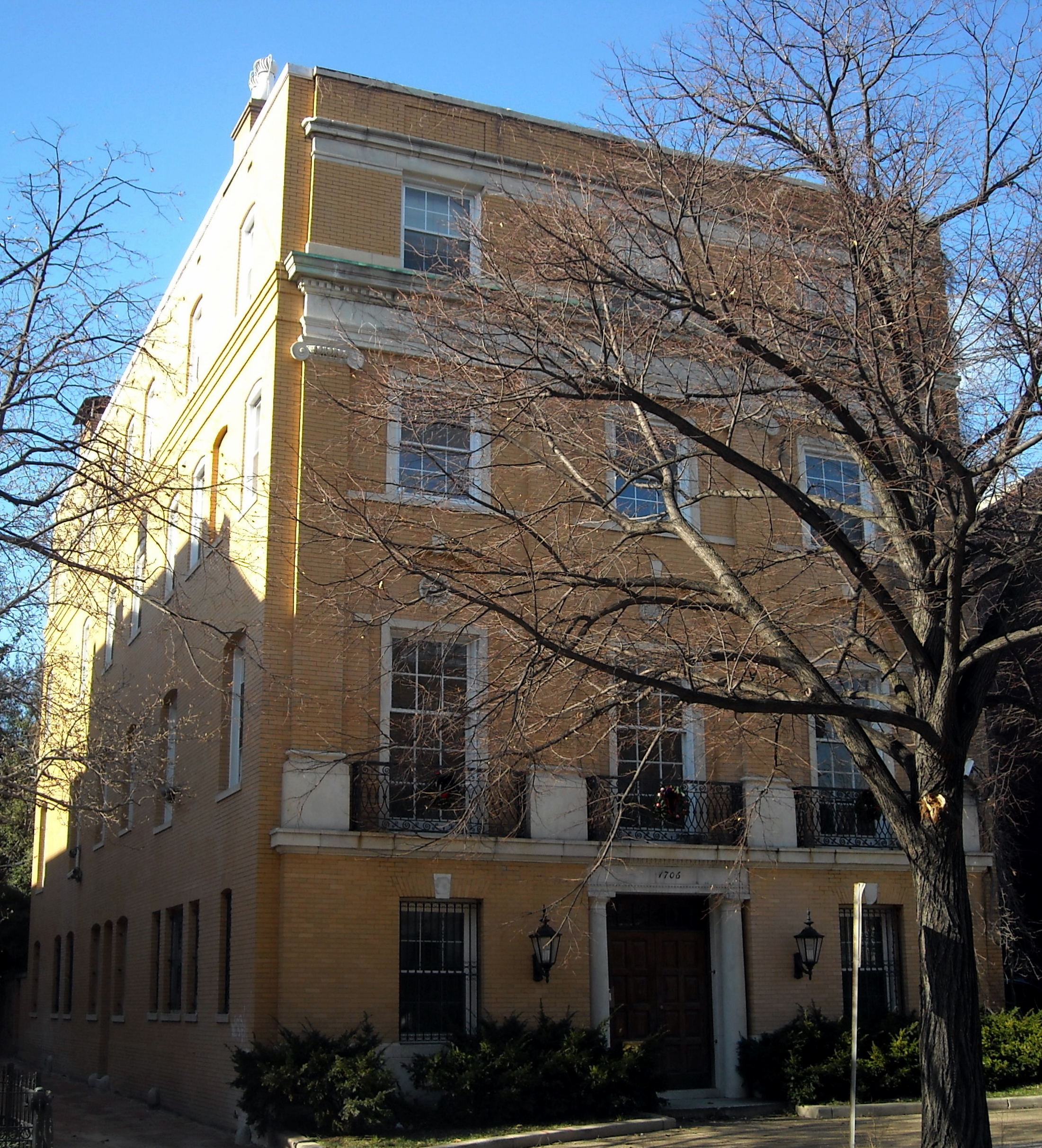
Former offices of the Soviet Life magazine located in Washington, D.C.

Under the terms of the inter-governmental agreement, the subscription levels of both magazines were restricted for many years to around 30,000.

In the late 1980s, with political and economic reform in the Soviet Union, there was a surge of interest in Soviet Life—readership rose to over 50,000.

=== Post-Soviet era ===
In December 1991, the Soviet Union was dissolved and, subsequently, the Russian government could not find the money to finance the production of Soviet Life. The last issue of Soviet Life was published in December 1991.

Just over one year later, in early 1993, through an agreement between RIA Novosti (the government press agency) and Rich Frontier Publishing, Soviet Life was reborn as Russian Life. The magazine was re-initiated as a bimonthly (whereas previously Soviet Life had been a monthly magazine) and continued in that fashion, albeit with a sporadic publishing timetable, due to funding difficulties.

In July 1995, the privately owned Vermont company, Russian Information Services, Inc., purchased all rights to Russian Life. Initially published as a monthly, the magazine soon settled into a bimonthly schedule. RIS has published well over 100 issues of Russian Life since 1995. Today the magazine is a 64-page colour bi-monthly magazine, with stories of Russian culture, history and life.

In January 2020, the parent company changed its name from Russian Information Services to Storyworkz, to reflect its new, broader publishing and business activities.

In 2022, Russian Life condemned the Russian invasion of Ukraine, calling it an "illegal, unjustified, unprovoked act that is in direct violation of international law".
