= Adilgerei Magomedtagirov =

Russian politician and general (1956–2009)

- Адильгерей Магомедтагиров
- Born: 1 November 1956; Gonada
- Died: 5 June 2009 (aged 52); Makhachkala
- Cause of death: Gunshot

Adilgerei Magomedovich Magomedtagirov (Russian: Адильгере́й Магоме́дович Магомедтаги́ров; 1 November 1956, Gonoda, Gunibsky District – 5 June 2009, Makhachkala) was a Dagestan politician and general, who served as the interior minister of Dagestan, a Russian Republic. He was a leader in the campaign against Islamic extremists in Dagestan, often using the slogan, "Take no prisoners."

== Career ==
Magomedtagirov was appointed Dagestan's interior minister in 1998. He actively participated in the battle that occurred as a result of the attacks perpetrated by Shamil Basayev-led Chechen-dominated Islamic guerrillas against Dagestan.

== Assassination ==
Three assassination attacks targeted Magomedtagirov since his appointment in 1998. He survived two of these attempts. The first two assassination attempts were in Makhachkala, the capital city of Dagestan, in August 2007 and on 4 February 2007, respectively.

He was shot dead on 5 June 2009, while attending a wedding at a restaurant in Makhachkala. Magomedtagirov was shot by a sniper as he stepped outside the wedding to talk to his brother and a co-worker. He died almost instantly from his wounds. One of his deputies, Aburazak Abubakarov, was also killed in the incident. In addition, three other people, including the father of the groom, were wounded in the attack.

An official of such a high rank had not been assassinated in Dagestan before.

Two people, one of whom had been serving as lieutenant, were arrested and sentenced in June 2013 due to their involvement in the murder. They were allegedly financed by a militant group led by Ibragim Gadzhidadayev.

== See also ==
- List of Heroes of the Russian Federation
