= Elmar Saar =

Estonian footballer (1908–1981)

Elmar Saar (19 February 1908 – 19 December 1981) was an Estonian footballer, ice hockey player, coach and football referee.

A defender, he played 19 games for the Estonia national team between 1928 and 1936.

1939 he was the manager of the Estonia national team.
