= List of ambassadors of Russia to Canada =

Ambassador of the Russian Federation to Canada
- Emblem of the Russian Foreign Ministry

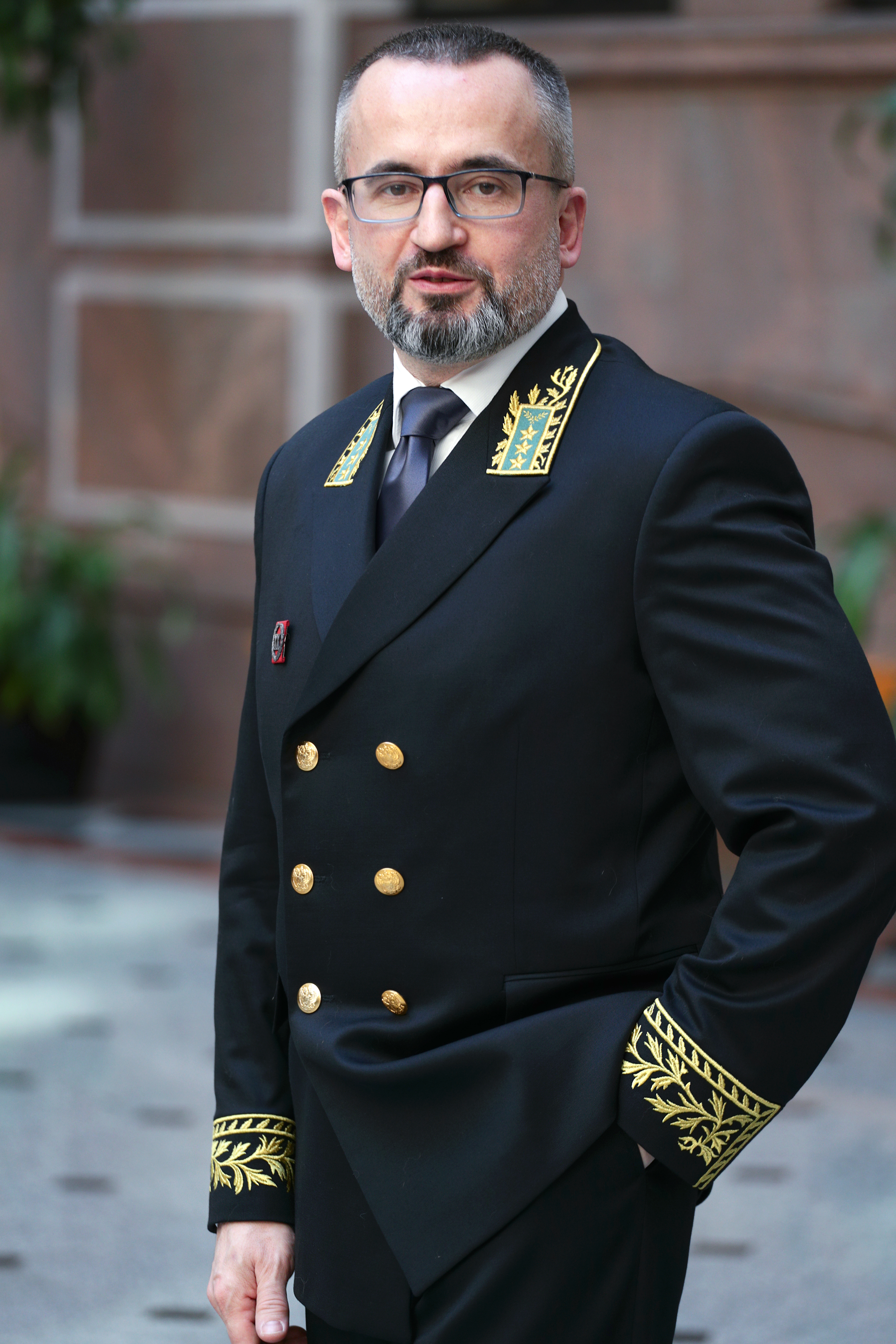
- Incumbent; Oleg Stepanov since 9 March 2021
- Ministry of Foreign Affairs; Embassy of Russia in Ottawa
- Style: His Excellency; The Honourable
- Reports to: Minister of Foreign Affairs
- Seat: Ottawa
- Appointer: President of Russia
- Term length: At the pleasure of the president
- Formation: 1942
- First holder: Fedor Tarasovich Gusev
- Website: Embassy of Russia in Ottawa

The ambassador extraordinary and plenipotentiary of the Russian Federation to Canada is the official representative of the president and the government of the Russian Federation to the prime minister and the government of Canada.

The ambassador and his staff work at large in the Embassy of Russia in Ottawa. There are consulate generals in Montreal and Vancouver, and honorary consuls in Edmonton, St. John's, Windsor and Vancouver. Russian interests in Canada are also represented by a trade mission based in Ottawa, and a representative of the Federal Agency of Fisheries in Halifax.

The post of Russian ambassador to Canada is currently held by Oleg Stepanov, incumbent since 9 March 2021.

== History of diplomatic relations ==
Prior to 1917, the Russian Empire maintained consular services in the Dominion of Canada, then part of the British Empire. By the time of the fall of the Tsarist government in 1917, there were consulates in Montreal, Halifax, and Vancouver. These did not recognise, and were not accredited by, the Soviet state, but continued to function until the late 1920s, funded by the Canadian government to deal with the large number of White émigrés who began to settle in the country.

Diplomatic relations at the mission level between the Soviet Union and Canada were first established on 12 June 1942. This was during the Second World War, when Canada and the Soviet Union were part of the allies. The first envoy, Fedor Tarasovich Gusev, was appointed on 30 July 1942, and presented his credentials on 21 October that year. Gusev left the post on 12 August 1943, and in November that year the missions were upgraded to embassies. Relations cooled significantly after the war, with the Gouzenko Affair and subsequent Kellock–Taschereau Commission in 1946 resulting in increasingly hostile communications. Both sides withdrew their ambassadors that year, and representation was thereafter by charge d'affaires following until 1953. With the dissolution of the Soviet Union in 1991, the Soviet ambassador, Richard Ovinnikov, continued as representative of the Russian Federation until 1992.

== List of representatives (1942–present) ==
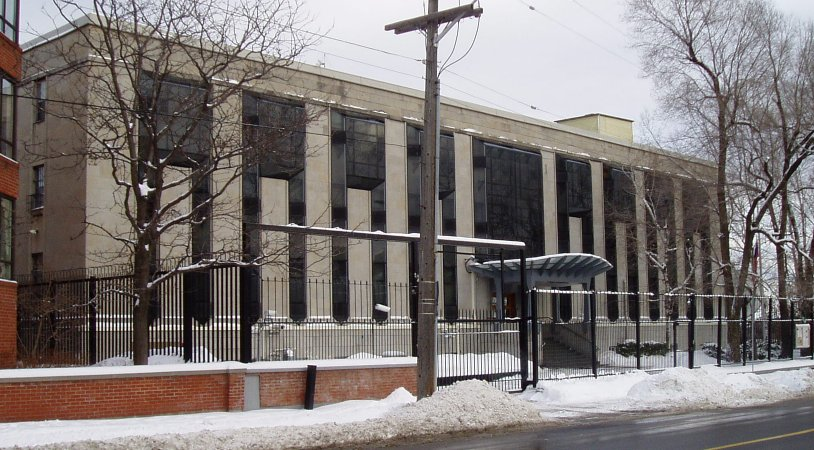
The embassy of Russia in Ottawa

=== Soviet Union to Canada (1942–1991) ===
Name	Title	Appointment	Termination	Notes
Fedor Gusev	Envoy	30 July 1942	12 August 1943	
Georgy Zarubin	Ambassador	23 March 1944	28 September 1946	
Nikolai Belokhvostikov	Charge d'affaires	1946	1949	
Leonid Teplov	Charge d'affaires	1949	1953	
Dmitry Chuvakhin	Ambassador	25 August 1953	26 October 1958	
Amazasp Arutyunyan	Ambassador	26 October 1958	20 February 1963	
Ivan Shpedko	Ambassador	20 February 1963	18 October 1968	
Boris Miroshnichenko	Ambassador	18 October 1968	1 June 1973	
Alexander Yakovlev	Ambassador	1 June 1973	29 October 1983	
Aleksei Rodionov	Ambassador	31 October 1983	30 October 1990	
Richard Ovinnikov	Ambassador	30 October 1990	25 December 1991	

=== Russian Federation to Canada (1991–present) ===
Name	Title	Appointment	Termination	Notes
Richard Ovinnikov	Ambassador	25 December 1991	10 February 1992	
Alexander Belonogov	Ambassador	10 February 1992	6 January 1998	
Vitaly Churkin	Ambassador	26 August 1998	5 June 2003	
Georgiy Mamedov	Ambassador	5 June 2003	24 October 2014	
Alexander Darchiev	Ambassador	24 October 2014	11 January 2021	
Oleg Stepanov	Ambassador	9 March 2021		
