= Elmar Hess =

German artist (born 1966)

- Born: 1966 (age 59–60); Hamburg
- Occupation: artist

Elmar Hess (born 5 October 1966) is a German artist.

His work includes film and video art, photography, installation and objects. Hess interprets interpersonal conflicts as a result of systemic pressure. Often an individual event is brought to mind in the context of historical events.

== Life ==
Hess' youth is marked by visits to the southern English coast. The proximity to the British overseas ports led him to develop a strong passion for transatlantic ships. Although this topic is not the focus of his work, his works–especially film–reflect countless details and often metaphoric imagery.

From 1988, Hess studied at the Stuttgart State Academy of Arts and the Academy of Fine Arts in Hamburg and attended the classes of Katharina Sieverding and Franz Erhard Walther. From 1998 to 2000 he studied film at the University of Hamburg by Michael Ballhaus and others. Since 2010 he has been teaching at the Academy of Fine Arts, Saarbrücken/GER.

Elmar Hess lives and works in Berlin.

== Work ==
=== "War Years" ===
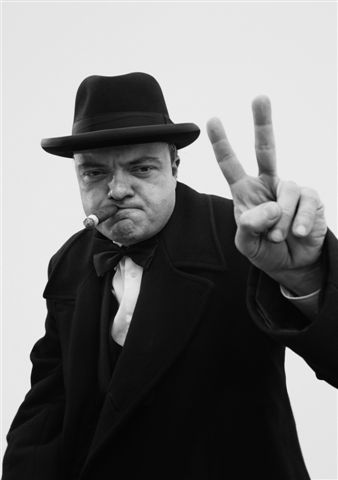
Elmar Hess – Cold War

Elmar Hess, who has an outwardly apparent similarity to the U.S. actor Orson Welles, directed his artistic debut work in 1996. In his film "War Years", he styled a relationship crisis, a World War II.

A huge kitchen table turns into a battlefield on which quarreling lovers, staged in allusion to the meeting between Winston Churchill (Hess mimes) and Adolf Hitler.

Like many details in a surreal film event, the film is to be experienced from the narrative perspective of a large model ship that is involved in the turmoil of war. The film focuses on the media handling of the serious German heritage, breaking taboos: images and sounds, figures, landscapes and architecture of the Nazi dictatorship and World War II fade into the storyline of the film with a character of many.

The film juxtaposes Nazi and Allied war strategies with scenes from a private relationship. The relationship narrative is presented against a backdrop the wartime social landscape, depiciting individuals navigating the historical and political pressure of the period.

=== "Freedom is not for free" ===
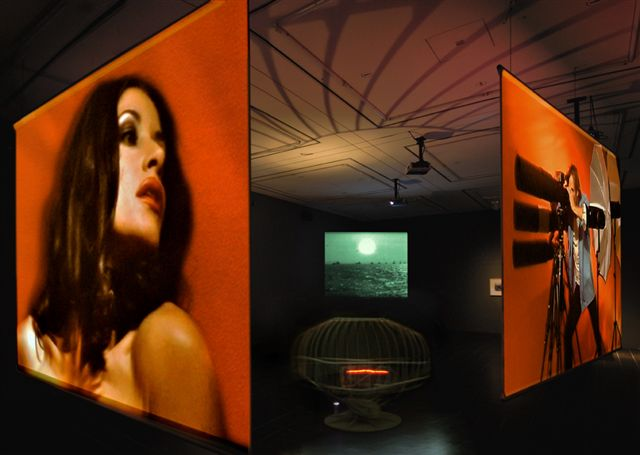
Elmar Hess – Freedom is not for free

In Hess' installation "Freedom is not for free" from 2006, the theme of his work is similar to "War Years", ending a conflict of love in front of the tribunal of a human rights committee. The case is a troubadour of grotesque stereotypes and behavior against better knowledge. Behind the individual drama the work traces a vision of society in which the fulfillment of human aspirations through lobbying and manipulation is prevented by the media.

As in most current work of Elmar Hess video sequences like in "Freedom is not for free" are in the center of his installation in which objects, photographs and records of private origin are connected with historical events. The battle of the sexes mutates into the confrontation between the two superpowers during the Cold War. Acting as historical figures acquaintances were kit out by Hess before he photographed them in known poses. Treating his friends ironically deceptively similar, Hess overstates politicians such as John F. Kennedy, Che Guevara, Mao Tse-tung, Willy Brandt and other prominent partners of the policy of the Iron Curtain. In his productions he refers repeatedly to the "wild" 1960s, in which he sees sexual taboos coded by power struggles in social dimension.

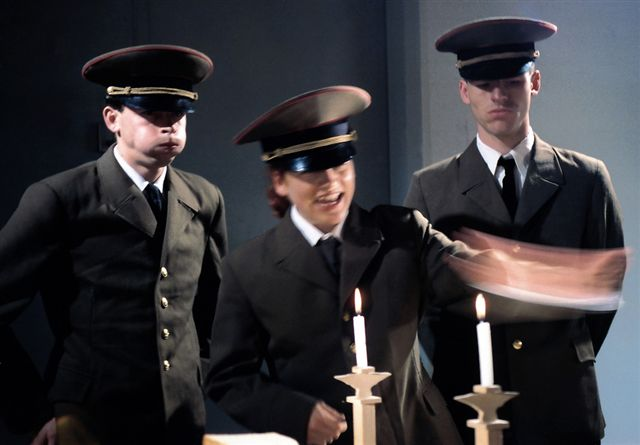
Elmar Hess – Kriegsjahre

== Selected exhibitions ==
- 1994, "Lost Paradise", Kunstraum Wien – Museumsquartier, Wien/AT
- 1996, "Kriegsjahre – Some sunny day we’ll meet again", Kunstverein Hamburg, Germany
- 1997, Internationales Video festival Mediopolis, Berlin, Germany
- 1997, "Surfing Systems", Kunstverein Kassel, Germany
- 1998, Balticum Video-Festival
- 1998, Filmfest Hamburg, Germany
- 1999, "Video und Lebensart", Galerie der Gegenwart, Kunsthalle Hamburg, Germany
- 1999, "German Open – Gegenwartskunst in Deutschland", Kunstmuseum Wolfsburg, Germany
- 2000, "Ticker", Galerie Gebauer, Berlin, Germany
- 2000, Internationales Filmfest Moskau, Russia
- 2001, Internationale Kurzfilmtage Oberhausen, Germany
- 2001, "Fact-Fiction", Edith-Russ-Haus für Medienkunst, Oldenburg, Germany
- 2002, "Sehsüchte", Filmfestival Potsdam, Germany
- 2003, "MIPDOC", Cannes, France
- 2003, Nordische Filmtage, Lübeck, Germany
- 2004, "Weiße Nächte Kiel Oben", Kunsthalle Kiel, Germany
- 2005, "Videothek", Galerie der Stadt Wels/AT
- 2006, "SNAFU – Medien, Mythen, Mind Control", Hamburger Kunsthalle, Germany
- 2007, "Fish and Ships", Barlach Halle Hamburg, Germany
- 2008, "Seestücke – Von Max Beckmann bis Gerhard Richter", Hamburger Kunsthalle, Germany
- 2008, "art Karlsruhe", Germany
- 2009, "Expanded Realities", Gallery of the City of Pecs/CZ
- 2009, "Man Son 1969 – Schrecken der Situation", Hamburger Kunsthalle, Germany
- 2010, "Man Son", Villa Merkel, Esslingen, Germany
- 2011 "The End of the Dream", Tresorfabrik, Berlin
- 2011 "cis", Blau – Raum für Kunst, Hamburg
- 2012 "Surf & Anarchie & Alchemie – Metaphorik und produktive Missverständnisse", Hamburger Kunsthalle
- 2012 "The Golden Cage", Kunst Büro Berlin (cat.)
- 2013 "La Mère Perdue", Saarländische Galerie – Europäisches Kunstforum, Berlin
- 2013 "STILLS", Gallery Whiteconcepts, Berlin
- 2013 "Money Works", Gallery Whiteconcepts, Berlin (cat.)

== Scholarships and awards ==
- 1996 Award of the International Videofestival Berlin "Mediopolis", Berlin, Germany
- 1996/97 Scholarship of the Hochschule für Bildende Künste Hamburg, Germany
- 1997 Scholarship "New Art in Hamburg" with a stay in London
- 1998/99 Scholarship of the German Kunstfonds
- 2002 Scholarship of the Werkleitz-Society, Germany
- 2003 Scholarship of the county Niedersachsen, Germany
- 2004 Project funding of the Freie und Hansestadt Hamburg, Germany
- 2005 Project funding of the Michael-Liebelt-Foundation, Germany
- 2006 Scholarship of the German Academy Rom Villa Massimo, Germany
- 2007 Scholarship of the Foundation Schöppingen, Germany
- 2008 Project funding of the Rudolf-Augstein-Foundation, Germany
- 2008 Project funding "Hamburgische Kulturstiftung", Germany
- 2009 Project funding of the Alfred-Toepfer-Foundation, Germany
- 2010 Project funding of the Abt-Straubinger-Stiftung, Stuttgart, Germany
- 2012 Rudolf Augstein Stiftung project grant, Hamburg
- 2012 Schering Stiftung project grant, Berlin
- 2013 Stiftung Kunstfonds grant, Bonn
