= Karim Mammadbeyov =

Dagestani revolutionary and Soviet politician

- Kərim Məmmədbəyov; Керим Мамедбеков

Chairman of the Council of People's Commissars of the Dagestan Autonomous Soviet Socialist Republic
- In office 1931–1937
- Preceded by: Djelal ed-Din Korkmasov
- Succeeded by: Dzhalalutdin Magomedov

Head of the Dagestan Regional Branch of the State Political Directorate
- In office 1921–1931
- Preceded by: Illarion Talakhadze
- Succeeded by: Position abolished

People's Commissar of Finance
- In office 1925–1928
- Premier: Djelal ed-Din Korkmasov
- Preceded by: Said Gabiyev
- Succeeded by: Ibragim Aliyev

People's Commissar of Internal Affairs
- In office 1921–1923
- Preceded by: Najmuddin Samurskii
- Succeeded by: Abu-Muslim Atayev

Personal details
- Born: 27 March 1899 Yersi, Dagestan Oblast, Caucasus Viceroyalty (now Republic of Dagestan, Russia)
- Died: 7 September 1938 (aged 39) Moscow, Russian SFSR, Soviet Union (now Russia)
- Party: All-Union Communist Party (Bolshevik)
- Other political affiliations: Russian Social Democratic Labour Party
- Spouse: Lyubov Erlich
- Children: Harun Mammadbeyov

Karim Hüseyn oğlu Mammadbeyov (Russian: Керим Гусейнович Мамедбеков, romanized: Kerim Guseynovich Mamedbekov, Azerbaijani: Kərim Hüseyn oğlu Məmmədbəyov; 27 March [O.S. 15 March] 1899 – 7 September 1938) was a Dagestani revolutionary and Soviet politician who participated in the Bolshevik movement in Dagestan and served in various government positions from 1921 to 1937.

== Early life ==
Karim Mammadbeyov was born in the village of Yersi, within the Kaitag-Tabasaran District to an ethnic Azerbaijani family of Mammad Huseyn Mammadbeyov, an office clerk, and his wife Seyid-Qayabika.

In 1915, while attending a real school in Derbent, Karim Mammadbeyov began attending revolutionary lectures and joined the Russian Social Democratic Labour Party in April 1917. In September 1917, he commenced his undergraduate studies at the University of Kazan, but the events following the October Revolution forced him to go back to Dagestan in early 1918. He actively participated in the events held by the Muslim Social Democratic Party party. After the British occupation of Dagestani ports during the Dagestan Campaign, Mammadbeyov was delegated to Astrakhan to work with local Muslim labourers. He participated in active fighting in Dagestan until February 1919, when his was disbanded to due heavy losses to typhus. He received the Order of the Red Banner in 1922.

== Political career ==
After the establishment of the Soviet power in the North Caucasus, Mammadbeyov was appointed head of the Dagestani branch of the Cheka, as well as People's Commissar of Internal Affairs of Dagestan. In the next nine years, he served as Dagestan's People's Commissar of Finance and Head of the Dagestan Regional Branch of the State Political Directorate. In 1931, he was elected Chairman of the Council of People's Commissars of the Dagestan Autonomous Soviet Socialist Republic and served in that position until 1937.

While serving in that position, Mammadbeyov effectively suppressed anti-Soviet movements in Chechnya and Dagestan and trained native Dagestanis in civil service, which experienced severe shortage in local cadres. During his term, the first medical, pedagogical and agricultural speciality schools, the Kumyk national theatre, the Dagestan Song and Dance Ensemble, the Folk Instruments Orchestra of Dagestan and the Writers' Union of Dagestan were established.

On 27 September 1937, in the midst of the Great Purge, Mammadbeyov was removed from his position, expelled from the Communist Party and arrested as an "enemy of state" based on false allegations, accused of being an accomplice to "bourgeois nationalists". He was not shown the arrest warrant until his third month in custody and the case protocol was completed only five and a half months later. Mammadbeyov was executed by firing squad on 7 September 1938 in Moscow.

== Personal life ==
From 1925, he was to married Lyubov Erlich, a fellow revolutionary and participant of the Russian Civil War in Dagestan. She was arrested together with her husband and sentenced to eight years in labour camps allegedly for supporting Trotskyism. Their son Harun was arrested in 1938, but acquitted soon afterward. He fought in the Great Patriotic War as a volunteer and died in the Battle of Moscow in 1941. Erlich-Mammadbeyova was released in 1948, having served her sentence, and died in 1988 in Moscow.
