= Alexander Yakovlev =

Soviet politician and diplomat (1923–2005)

- Александр Яковлев
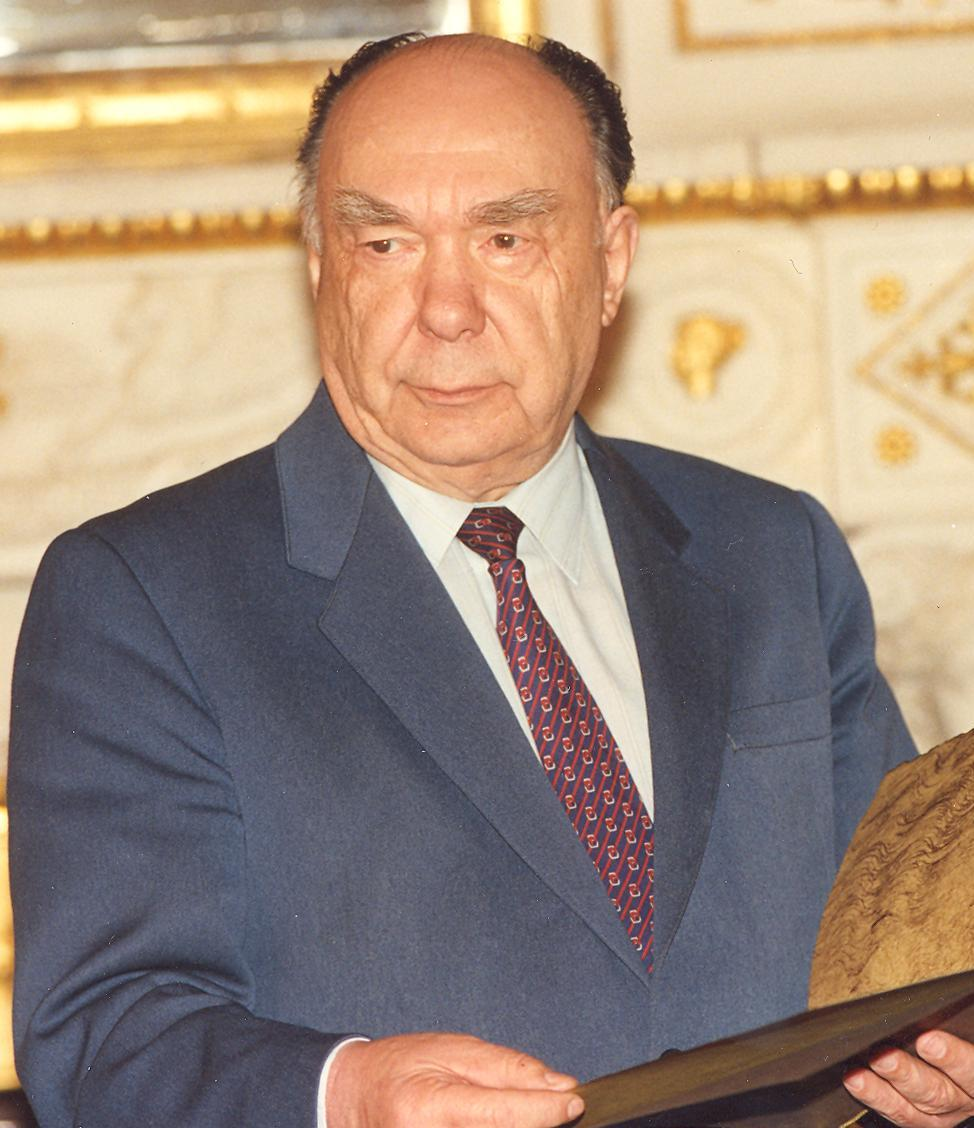

Head of the Propaganda Department of the Communist Party of the Soviet Union
- In office 5 July 1985 – March 1986
- Preceded by: Vladimir Stepakov
- Succeeded by: Yuri Sklyarov

Full member of the 27th Politburo of the Communist Party of the Soviet Union
- In office 26 June 1987 – 14 July 1990

Member of the 27th Secretariat of the Communist Party of the Soviet Union
- In office 6 March 1986 – 14 July 1990

Soviet Union Ambassador to Canada
- In office 1 June 1973 – 29 October 1983
- Premier: Alexei Kosygin; Nikolai Tikhonov
- Preceded by: Boris Miroshnichenko
- Succeeded by: Aleksei A. Rodionov

Personal details
- Born: 2 December 1923 Korolyovo, Yaroslavl Governorate, Russian SFSR, Soviet Union (now Yaroslavl Oblast, Russia)
- Died: 18 October 2005 (aged 81) Moscow, Russia
- Party: Communist Party of the Soviet Union (1944–1991); Russian Party of Social Democracy (1995–2002)
- Education: Columbia University
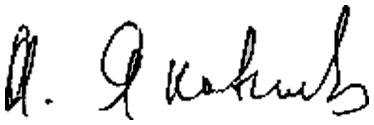
- Signature

Military service
- Allegiance: Soviet Union
- Branch/service: Soviet Navy
- Years of service: 1941–1943
- Battles/wars: World War II; Eastern Front; Siege of Leningrad

Alexander Nikolayevich Yakovlev (Russian: Алекса́ндр Никола́евич Я́ковлев; 2 December 1923 – 18 October 2005) was a Soviet and Russian politician, diplomat, and historian. A member of the Politburo and Secretariat of the Communist Party of the Soviet Union throughout the 1980s, he was termed the "godfather of glasnost", and was the intellectual force behind Mikhail Gorbachev's reform programme of glasnost and perestroika.

Born into a rural family, Yakovlev served as a platoon commander of a marine brigade during World War II, and became a member of the Communist Party of the Soviet Union following the war. During the rule of Nikita Khrushchev, he became a member of the Central Committee of the CPSU, before resigning to study abroad as part of the Fulbright Programme, returning in 1960. Under Leonid Brezhnev, he became Deputy Head of Agitprop and was placed in charge of a group on creating the 1977 Constitution of the Soviet Union. He was later demoted to ambassador to Canada, in response to his public opposition to ethnic nationalism within the Soviet Union.

In the early 1980s, Yakovlev returned to the Soviet Union, and became a prominent supporter of Mikhail Gorbachev's proposed reforms. In response to his perceived importance in the reforms, he came under attack from hardliners such as Alexander Lebed and Gennady Zyuganov, eventually resigning two days prior to the 1991 Soviet coup d'état attempt. During the coup attempt, Yakovlev was a supporter of pro-democratic forces, and later became a supporter of Boris Yeltsin before turning against his successor, Vladimir Putin, in response to democratic backsliding which occurred during Putin's presidency.

== Early life and education ==
The first child of five, Yakovlev was born to a peasant family in a small village called Korolyovo, on the Volga River, near Yaroslavl. He had four sisters, two of whom died in infancy. His father, Nikolai Alekseyevich Yakovlev, only attended school for four years, and his mother, Agafiya Mikhailovna, for three months. Yakovlev was sickly in childhood and suffered from scrofula. His father served in the Red Cavalry during the Russian Civil War and was a devoted communist; he became the first chairman of a local collective farm. Their house was set ablaze while he was seven, and the family moved to Krasnye Tkachi.

=== World War II service ===
Yakovlev graduated from secondary school days before Nazi Germany invaded the Soviet Union. He was drafted into the Soviet Navy in November 1941, with brief training, and became part of the Soviet Marine Corps. He served as a platoon commander of the 6th Marine Brigade of the Baltic Fleet, on the Volkhov Front during the Siege of Leningrad. On 6 August 1942, he was leading 30 Chuvash soldiers and was ordered to charge German positions in Vinyagolovo near Leningrad and was badly wounded. He was hospitalised until February 1943, and was subsequently demobilised. He became a member of the Communist Party of the Soviet Union in 1944. At this time he regarded the Communist Party as "life's truth", and affirmed he was totally loyal and faithful to Soviet Union, and he was an ardent admirer of Joseph Stalin.

=== Stalin and Khrushchev periods ===
In September 1945, he resumed education at the Yaroslavl Pedagogical Institute to study history. On September 8, 1945, he married Nina Ivanovna Smirnova. He graduated the same year and went to Moscow to attend the Higher Party School. In November 1946, he was appointed the instructor of the Department of Propaganda and Agitation in Yaroslavl, a post he held for a year and a half. Shortly after this, he had his first doubts about the regime, when he was shocked to see train after train carrying Soviet ex-prisoners-of-war being sent to labour camps. At the Vspolye train station, he saw weeping women and was dismayed at how they were treated. This memory troubled him deeply and never left him.

In March 1953, shortly after Stalin's death, he was assigned to the party's Central Committee as an instructor in the department of schools. On 25 February 1956, Khrushchev's Secret Speech became the most traumatic event in Yakovlev's early Moscow life; he listened to the speech from a balcony in the Grand Kremlin Palace. After the 20th Party Congress, Yakovlev lost his previous enthusiasm for communism and led a double life. He wanted to turn to the original sources on Communism—Marx, Engels, Lenin, German philosophers, French and Italian socialists and British economists. He asked to leave the Central Committee to enroll in the Academy of Social Sciences of the Central Committee. While twice refused, he was finally allowed to study there for two years and became convinced that Marxism-Leninism was hollow, impractical, and inhumane, as well as a prognostic fraud. This healed his internal political conflict following the 20th Party Congress. He began to agree with Khrushchev.

=== Studies at Columbia University ===
Beginning in 1958, he was chosen as an exchange student at Columbia University in the United States for one year, as part of the Fulbright Programme. Of the seventeen Soviet students, fourteen were selected by the KGB. Yakovlev and three others, including Oleg Kalugin, went to Columbia. All other students besides Yakovlev were members of the KGB. He intensively studied the English language, Roosevelt and the New Deal, drawing connections between the United States at that time and the Soviet Union. At the end, in May 1959, the Soviet visitors were taken on a thirty-day tour of the United States, during which he stayed with families from Vermont, Chicago and Iowa. However, his year in America did little to assuage his anti-Americanism because of the greed, racism, and other things that he witnessed. Yakovlev returned to the Central Committee to work on ideology and propaganda, and published several anti-American books. He defended a dissertation dealing with the historiography of US foreign policy, and received the degree of Candidate of Sciences, the equivalent of a doctorate, in July 1960.

== Early political career and exile ==
In July 1965, he was appointed the first deputy head of the Propaganda Department of the Central Committee of the CPSU by Leonid Brezhnev. In August 1968, Yakovlev was sent to Prague as the representative of the Central Committee, heading a group of Soviet journalists with the mission of propaganda for the Soviet intervention, and witnessed the entry of tanks into the city. He later spoke out against removing Alexander Dubček. That same year, he was placed in command of a group charged with drafting a new constitution. Yakovlev served as editor of several party publications and rose to the key position of head of the CPSU's Department of Ideology and Propaganda from 1969 to 1973. In January 1970, he visited the United States again, meeting then-Governor of California Ronald Reagan, diplomat Henry Kissinger, and actress Jane Fonda, who warned him that Moscow "did not appreciate the full danger of American militarism". This trip, again, failed to change his unfavourable impression of the United States.

=== Exile to Canada ===
In 1972, he took a bold stand by publishing the article entitled "Against Antihistoricism" in Literaturnaya Gazeta, critical of Russian nationalism, and nationalism in the Soviet Union in general. As a result, he was removed from his position. Given the choice of a diplomatic post as a form of exile, he chose to be the ambassador to Canada, remaining at that post for a decade. He arrived in Canada in July 1973. During this time, he and Canadian Prime Minister Pierre Trudeau became close friends. Trudeau's second son, Alexandre Trudeau, was named after Yakovlev.

From 16 to 23 May 1983, Yakovlev accompanied Mikhail Gorbachev, who at the time was the Soviet official in charge of agriculture, on his tour of Canada. The purpose of the visit was to tour Canadian farms and agricultural institutions, in the hopes of taking lessons that could be applied in the Soviet Union. However, the two also renewed their earlier friendship and, tentatively at first, began to discuss the prospect of liberalisation in the Soviet Union.

In an interview years later, Yakovlev recalled:

At first we kind of sniffed around each other and our conversations didn't touch on serious issues. And then, verily, history plays tricks on one, we had a lot of time together as guests of then Liberal Minister of Agriculture Eugene Whelan in Canada who, himself, was too late for the reception because he was stuck with some striking farmers somewhere. So we took a long walk on that Minister's farm and, as it often happens, both of us suddenly were just kind of flooded and let go. I somehow, for some reason, threw caution to the wind and started telling him about what I considered to be utter stupidities in the area of foreign affairs, especially about those SS-20 missiles that were being stationed in Europe and a lot of other things. And he did the same thing. We were completely frank. He frankly talked about the problems in the internal situation in Russia. He was saying that under these conditions, the conditions of dictatorship and absence of freedom, the country would simply perish. So it was at that time, during our three-hour conversation, almost as if our heads were knocked together, that we poured it all out and during that three-hour conversation we actually came to agreement on all our main points.

=== Return to the Soviet Union ===
Two weeks after the visit, as a result of Gorbachev's interventions, Yakovlev was recalled from Canada by Yuri Andropov and became Director of the Institute of World Economy and International Relations of the Academy of Sciences of the Soviet Union in Moscow on 16 August 1983; he was succeeded by his friend Yevgeny Primakov (himself later Prime Minister of Russia) in 1985. Although impressed with Canada's free, competitive economy, especially in agriculture, the weakest part for the USSR, and the benefits of the rule of law, Yakovlev published a booklet called Poor Santa Claus, or the Police Eye of Democracy (Bednaia Santa Klaus, ili politseiskie oko Demokratii), allegedly exposing Canadian totalitarian practices under the pseudonym N. Agashin. It described how capitalism created "its sanitary service - a system of repression, intimidation and terror", how it "brainwashed its citizens", how the United States "tyrannized its neighbor" and how Canada was really a totalitarian police state with a democratic facade.

== Perestroika ==
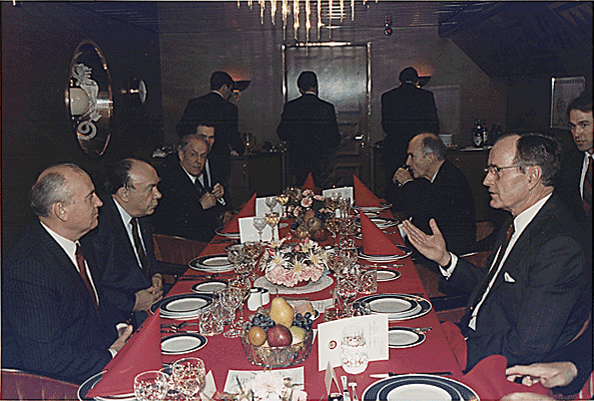
Mikhail Gorbachev and Yakovlev opposite United States President George H. W. Bush on board the SS Maxim Gorkiy at the 1989 Malta Summit.

When Gorbachev became General Secretary of the Communist Party of the Soviet Union in 1985, Yakovlev became a senior advisor, helping to shape Soviet foreign policy by advocating Soviet non-intervention in Eastern Europe, and accompanying Gorbachev on his five summit meetings with President of the United States Ronald Reagan. In the summer of 1985, Yakovlev became head of the propaganda department of the CPSU Central Committee. Domestically, he argued in favour of the reform programmes that became known as glasnost (openness) and perestroika (restructuring) and played a key role in executing those policies.

After the XXth Congress, in an ultra-narrow circle of our closest friends and associates, we often discussed the problems of democratization of the country and society. We chose a simple - like a sledgehammer - method of propagating the "ideas" of late Lenin. A group of true, not imaginary reformers developed (of course, orally) the following plan: to strike with the authority of Lenin at Stalin, at Stalinism. And then, if successful, - to strike with Plekhanov and Social Democracy - at Lenin, and then – with liberalism and "moral socialism" - at revolutionarism in general... The Soviet totalitarian regime could be destroyed only through glasnost and totalitarian party discipline, while hiding behind the interests of improving socialism. [...] Looking back, I can proudly say that a clever, but very simple tactic - the mechanisms of totalitarianism against the system of totalitarianism – has worked.

— Yakovlev, in the introduction to "Black Book of Communism"

In 1987, the Russian neo-Nazi organization Pamyat sent a letter entitled "Stop Yakovlev!" to the plenum of the Central Committee of the Communist Party of the Soviet Union, labelling Yakovlev as a Jew and the main instigator of a course of action that would lead to the 'capitulation before the imperialists'.

For decades, it was the official policy of the Soviet Union to deny the existence of the secret protocol to the Nazi–Soviet Pact. At the behest of Mikhail Gorbachev, Yakovlev headed a commission investigating the existence of such a protocol. In December 1989 Yakovlev concluded that the protocol had existed and revealed his findings to the Soviet Parliament. As a result, the first multi-party elected Congress of Soviets since 1918 "passed the declaration admitting the existence of the secret protocols, condemning and denouncing them".

== Downfall and later life ==
He was promoted to the Politburo in 1987, but by 1990 he had become the focus of attacks by hardliner communists in the party opposed to liberalisation. At the 28th Congress of the Communist Party of the Soviet Union in July 1990, Alexander Lebed caused uproar when he asked Yakovlev: "Alexander Nikolayevich... How many faces have you got?" An embarrassed Yakovlev consulted his colleagues and continued on with the proceedings, but resigned from the Politburo the day after the congress concluded. As the communists opposed to liberalisation gained strength, his position became more tenuous; fiercely attacked by his former protégé Gennady Zyuganov in May 1991, he resigned from the CPSU two days before the August Coup in 1991. During the coup, Yakovlev joined the democratic opposition against it. Following the failed coup attempt, Yakovlev blamed Gorbachev for having been naïve in bringing the plotters into his inner circle, saying Gorbachev was "guilty of forming a team of traitors. Why did he surround himself with people capable of treason?"

In his book Inside the Stalin Archives (2008), Jonathan Brent relates that in 1991, when there were Lithuanian crowds demonstrating for independence from the Soviet Union, Gorbachev consulted Yakovlev about the wisdom of an armed repression against them. Gorbachev asked, "Should we shoot?" Yakovlev answered that, "if a single Soviet soldier fired a single bullet on the unarmed crowds, Soviet power would be over." Despite Yakovlev's warnings, the Soviet Union proceeded to invade Lithuania following its declaration of independence, and the Soviet Union collapsed seven months later.

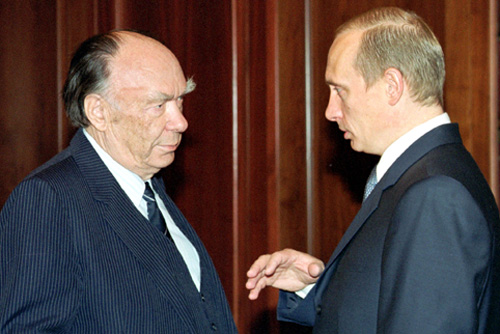
Yakovlev, as the head of the Commission on the Rehabilitation of Soviet Repression Victims, meets President Vladimir Putin

Yakovlev led Boris Yeltsin's commission for the rehabilitation of victims of Soviet political repression. In the years following the dissolution of the Soviet Union, Yakovlev wrote and lectured extensively on history, politics and economics. He acted as the leader of the Russian Party of Social Democracy, which in the mid-1990s fused into the United Democrats, a pro-reform alliance that was later reorganised into the Union of Right Forces. In 2002, acting as head of the Presidential Committee for the Rehabilitation of Victims of Political Repression, he was present at the announcement of the release of a CD detailing names and short biographies of the victims of Soviet purges. In his later life, he founded and led the International Democracy Foundation. He advocated taking responsibility for the past crimes of communism and was critical of President Vladimir Putin's restrictions on democracy.

In 2000, he publicly alleged that Swedish diplomat Raoul Wallenberg, who became famous for his role in saving thousands of Hungarian Jews from the Holocaust, was shot and killed in Soviet secret police headquarters in 1947. He was called "God's commie" in a 2002 article for investigating crimes of the Soviet state.

== Honours and awards ==
- Order of Merit for the Fatherland, 2nd class
- Order of the October Revolution
- Order of the Red Banner
- Order of the Patriotic War, 1st class
- Order of the Red Banner of Labour, three times
- Order of Friendship of Peoples
- Order of the Red Star
- Order of Venerable Sergius of Radonezh, 3rd class (Russian Orthodox Church, 1997)
- Great Officers Cross of the Order of Merit of the Federal Republic of Germany
- Commander of the Order of Merit of the Republic of Poland
- Commander of the Order of the Lithuanian Grand Duke Gediminas (Lithuania)
- Knight Grand Cross of the Order of the Three Stars (Latvia)
- Grand Cross of the Order of the Cross of Terra Mariana (Estonia)
- Collar of the Order of the Liberator (Venezuela)

== Publications ==
- Alexander N. Yakovlev and Abel G. Aganbegyan, Perestroika, 1989, Scribner (1989), trade paperback, ISBN 0-684-19117-2
- Alexander Yakovlev, USSR the Decisive Years, First Glance Books (1991), hardcover, ISBN 1-55013-410-8
- Alexander Yakovlev, translated by Catherine A. Fitzpatrick, The Fate of Marxism in Russia, Yale University Press (1993), hardcover, ISBN 0-300-05365-7; trade paperback, Lightning Source, UK, Ltd. (17 November 2004) ISBN 0-300-10540-1
- Alexander N. Yakovlev, foreword by Paul Hollander, translated by Anthony Austin, Century of Violence in Soviet Russia, Yale University Press (2002), hardcover, 254 pages, ISBN 0-300-08760-8; trade paperback, Yale University Press (2002), 272 pages, ISBN 0-300-10322-0
- A. N. Yakovlev, Горькая чаша (Bitter Cup), Yaroslavl, 1994.
- A. N. Yakovlev, Сумерки (Time of Darkness - lit. "Dusk"), Moscow, 2003, 688 pages, ISBN 5-85646-097-9
- Alexander N. Yakovlev, Digging Out: How Russia Liberated Itself from the Soviet Union, Encounter Books (December 1, 2004), hardcover, 375 pages, ISBN 1-59403-055-3

== See also ==
- Joseph S. Nye, Jr., former dean of Harvard Kennedy School considers Yakovlev's story a prime example of the importance of soft power in resolving international conflicts, such as, in Yakovlev's case, the Cold War.
