= Elmar Schmid =

Swiss clarinetist

Elmar Schmid (born 1947 in Binn, Switzerland) is a Swiss clarinetist. He studied in Zurich with Professors Marcel Wahlich, Hansjörg Leuthold and, in Berlin, with Karl Leister.

He was Professor of Clarinet and Chamber Music at the Zurich School of Music where he also carried out an intense professional artistic activity. Many recordings give proof of his interest in chamber music for clarinet.

He specialises in New Music and original Folkloric music. He is musical Director of the 'Oberwalliser Spillit' ensemble, for which the composer Heinz Holliger has written 'Alb Cher'. In 1999, Jürg Wittenbach dedicated to this musical ensemble his composition 'Gragantua chez les Helvètes du Haut-Wallais' (Scenes on Rabelais). He was a part of Collegium Novum Zürich.

He is married to the clarinetist Sabine Gertschen; they have two children.
