= Ministry of Internal Affairs (Dagestan) =

Министерства внутренних дел Республики Дагестан Dagestan's Interior Ministry
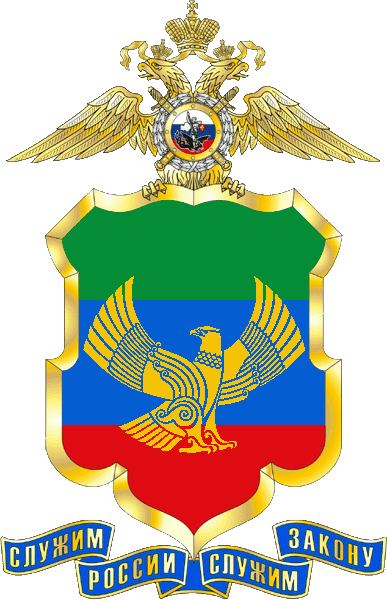
- MVD logo
- Common name: Dagestani Police
- Abbreviation: МВД РД
- Motto: служа закону, Служим народу by serving the law, we serve the people

Agency overview
- Formed: 1881 / 1921
- Employees: 18,000

Jurisdictional structure
- Operations jurisdiction: Russia
- General nature: Local civilian police

Operational structure
- Headquarters: Makhachkala
- Agency executive: Abdurashid Magomedov, Interior Minister
- Parent agency: MVD
- Units: List: Criminal Investigative Department; Maritime Police; Dagestani Federal Migatory Service; Traffic Police; OMON Special Force; Air Division

Website
- Official Site

The Ministry of Internal Affairs of Dagestan (Министерства внутренних дел Республики Дагестан) is the interior ministry of Dagestan in southern Russia. The Ministry is headquartered in Makhachkala. As of 2012 the minister was Abdurashid Magomedov.

== History ==
The Russian Ministry of Internal Affairs was founded on September 8, 1822. It was founded as part of a government reform. The first minister was Count Kochubey.

An especially important milestone in the construction of the Russian Interior Ministry was in 1880, when the Emperor Alexander II carried reorganized the agency, which later took a leading position in the state. Its head was almost the first minister of the Empire.

After the October Revolution, the Ministry became the People's Commissariat of Internal Affairs, which laid the foundation for the pre-revolutionary structure of the MVD. The establishment of Soviet rule in the republic began a new phase of law enforcement agencies, including police (then-called Militsiya).

On 21 April 1920, the Dagestan Revolutionary Committee appointed Karim Mamedbekova as military commissioner and the Chief of Police. He was commissioned to prepare a draft of militia organization.

On 28 April 1920 in Timir-Khan-Shura a committee chaired by D. Korkmasova adopted a resolution "to protect the revolutionary order and public security police". On 13 May the resolution was approved by the supreme authority of the police.

With the formation of the Dagestan Autonomous Soviet Socialist Republic, in February 1921 the Regional police department was renamed the General Directorate of Dagestan. Red Army units eliminated almost all of the remaining gangs by the end of 1925.

The "Perestroika" period led to major changes in internal affairs bodies. The advent of sovereignty of the form Soviet republics changed their legal status.

In October 1989, the Ministry of Internal Affairs of the Russian SFSR emerged. In December, the Council of Ministers approved its new structure.

The time since the Soviet collapse, revealed new challenges in the form of rapid growth of crime, which was a reflection of the dysfunctional state and social establishment. Sociopolitical tensions, ethnic conflicts, economic deterioration, and most importantly, the professionalism and intellectualization of crime, armed with the latest technologies.

The patriotic and moral qualities of the police officers were severely tested during the anti-terror operation in the North Caucasus and in the fight against extremism and terrorism, signaled by the attacks in Makhachkala, the Caspian, Buinaksk and in several other Russian cities, and finally the tragedy of the Moscow theater hostage crisis in 2004.

The history of the Russian Interior Ministry is closely connected with Dagestan. The Ministry adopted techniques employed by the military governor of the Dagestan region. Lieutenant general Prince Chavchavadze Baryatinsky, Volsky, Tikhonov, Major-General Alftan, Ermolov, Colonel Dingizov-Jansen and others over the years maintained law and order in Dagestan.

In 2011 the Militsiya were renamed the Politsiya.

== See also ==
- Adilgerei Magomedtagirov
