= Elmar Järvesoo =

Estonian agricultural scientist and politician

Elmar Järvesoo (until 1935 Elmar Gerberson; 22 March 1909, Pati Parish, Pärnu County – 7 December 1994 Daytona Beach, United States) was an Estonian agricultural scientist and politician.

In 1934 he graduated from the University of Tartu with a degree in agronomy. From 1934 to 1937 and in the 1940s he taught at the University of Tartu.

Following the Soviet reoccupation of Estonia in 1944, he fled to Germany. He was one of the founders of the Baltic University (1945–1949).

In 1949 he moved to the United States. From 1950 to 1977 he taught at the University of Massachusetts. In addition to teaching, he was the long-time head of Tartu Institute (in Toronto, Canada).

Järvesoo was also active in politics. From 1964 to 1971 he was the Estonian minister of education in exile, and from 1964 to 1971 the Estonian minister of agriculture in exile.

== Works ==
- Tööviljakuse tõstmise vajadusest meie põllumajanduses (1937)
- Rootsi põllumajandusliku ühistuliikumise organisatsioon ja viimaseaegne areng (1938)
- Kodumaal ja võõrsil (1965, Canada; coauthor)
- Cost of Producing Greenhouse Flowers in Massachusetts, 1977 (1978, Amherst)
- A Case Study of a Soviet Republic: The Estonian SSR (1978, Boulder; with Tõnu Parming)
- Changes in Cost of Producing Greenhouse Flowers in Massachusetts, 1977–1981 (1983, Amherst)
- Dotsent Jaan Mets (1988, Toronto; coauthor)
- Balti Ülikool Saksamaal 1945–1949 (1991, Toronto; coauthor)
