= Elmar Rajsur =

Russian-Azerbaijani singer

Elmar Rajsur (Azerbaijani: Elmar Racsur, Russian: Эльмар Раджсур) is a Russian singer of Azerbaijani heritage who sings Indian songs. He performs in clubs in Moscow. In November 2007 he performed half to the visiting Indian delegation accompanying Indian Prime Minister Dr Manmohan Singh on his 28-hour visit to Russia. He is the only performer of Indian music in Bollywood style in Russia for more than 20 years.
