= Fedor Gusev =

Soviet diplomat

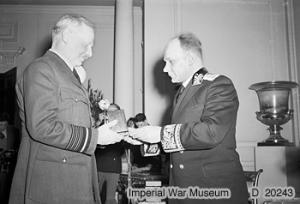
Gusev, right, in Soviet diplomatic uniform, presents Sir Arthur Harris with the Order of Suvorov in London, 16 May 1944

Fedor Tarasovich Gusev (Russian: Фёдор Тарасович Гусев; 29 April 1905 – 9 March 1987) was a Soviet diplomat.

== Career ==
Gusev graduated in 1931 from Law Institute in Leningrad and in 1937 from Diplomatic Institute. Since 1935 he worked for the Soviet Ministry of Foreign Affairs:

- 1938–39: head of the 3rd Western Department
- 1941: in the 2nd European Department
- 1942–43: ambassador in Canada
- 1943–46: ambassador in Great Britain
- 1946–52: Deputy Minister of Foreign Affairs of the Soviet Union
- 1956–62: ambassador in Sweden
- later worked in the central apparatus of the USSR Ministry of Foreign Affairs, until 1975.

Gusev took part in the Tehran, Yalta and Potsdam Conferences as well as the European Advisory Commission. Between 1946 and 1950, he was also member of the Supreme Soviet of the USSR.

== Death ==
Gusev died on 9 March 1987 in Moscow, and was buried at Kuntsevo Cemetery.
