= Zaid Orudzhev =

Russian academic

Zaid Melikovich Orudzhev
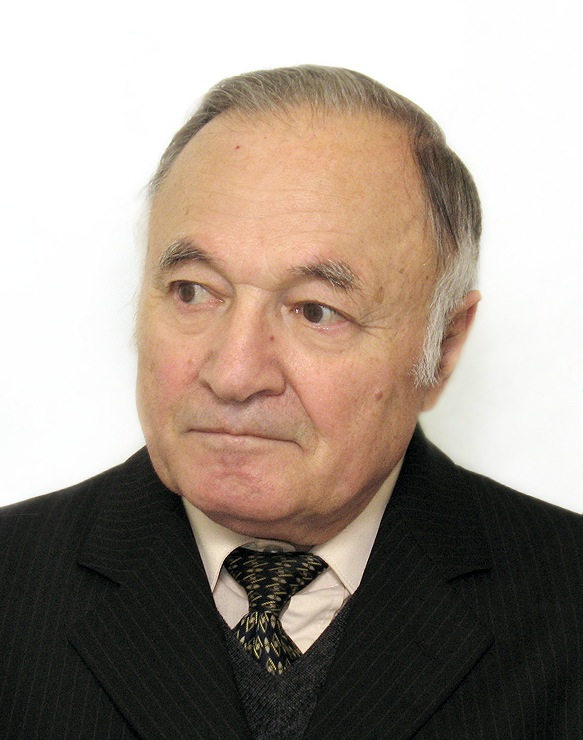
- Born: April 4, 1932 (age 94); Baku, Azerbaijan
- Education: Moscow State University
- Scientific career
- Fields: History of philosophy, Dialectical logic, Sociological methodology

Zaid Melikovich Orudzhev (Russian: Заи́д Ме́ликович Ору́джев; born on April 4, 1932) is an Azerbaijani-born Russian academic specialising in the history of philosophy, dialectical logic and sociological methodology. He is a doctor of philosophy and currently a professor at the Moscow State Academy for Business Administration.

== Biography ==
Zaid Orudzhev was born in Baku, entered the Faculty of Philosophy at Lomonosov Moscow State University in the early 1950s, graduating in 1955. For the next 12 years, he taught at a number of educational institutions back in Baku (mainly at the state university), during which time he was awarded a doctorate for his thesis on "The problems of dialectical logic in the economic research of Karl Marx". In 1967-1969 he founded and was at the head of the department of philosophy at the Moscow Institute of Electronic Technology.

In 1969, Orudzhev was appointed a professor at the Faculty of Philosophy at his alma mater, Lomonosov Moscow State University, a post he would occupy for the next 16 years. In 1985, he embarked upon a two-year term as director of the Institute of Philosophy and Law at the Academy of Sciences in the Azerbaijan Soviet Socialist Republic. In 1986, he edited and co-authored "Dialectical logic", published in Moscow. Between 1987 and 1992, he was professor of philosophy at the Higher Party School.

During the next few years, Orudzhev was a senior research fellow and then chief research fellow at the Russian President's Academy of State Service. Since 2005, he has been a professor at the Moscow State Academy for Business Administration.

Prof. Orudzhev has read courses of lectures on dialectical logic at universities in Germany, the US, Canada and Cuba.

== Principal works ==
While studying the history of philosophy and the natural sciences in the 1960s, 1970s, 1980s, and 1990s, Orudzhev explored the problems of theoretical proof and how theoretical proof differs from empirical and formal logical proofs, as well as the problem of producing a systematic exposition of dialectical logic. In the 1980s, in a book published by Cornell University in the US, the Sovietologist Prof. James Scanlan wrote that Orudzhev's work meant dialectical logic could not be rejected in the US, as had been the case previously USSR specialists, because the issue had been raised to a level that merited scientific respect. Orudzhev paid a great deal of attention to developing a method for the analysis of intermediate links in order to create systems of scientific theory. The significance of this last aspect for the research of theory systems in biology was highlighted by a research group led by A.M.Chernukh, an academician from the USSR Academy of Medical Sciences.

Orudzhev's articles were the first in the USSR to develop the theory of reform as an essential means for the development of any society, including socialist society, as well as the theory of the regional development of society, as opposed to centralised development, as a universal means of economic management.

== Main idea and conception of human nature ==
In the early 21st century, Orudzhev has been studying the emergence of man from the animal world (a problem identified by Darwin), and has developed the concepts of "the past" and "factors of the past", as well as the concept of the "accumulated past", as substantial concepts in "human nature". Orudzhev defines the past, according to Nietzsche, only humans possess, as a unity of time that has already passed and a human being's accumulated activities. This view of the past enabled humans to include internal time in their life activities, as a result of which they also started to grasp logic. Incidentally, Aristotle wrote: "What is past cannot possibly be other than it is, as Agathon has well said, saying—one thing alone not even God can do, to make undone whatever has been done". But humans did indeed emerge from the "accumulated past", from a source to which even gods have no access.

Contrary to most attempts to solve this problem on the basis of "pure naturalism", and specifically using biological methods, Orudzhev believes that the problem of the shift from animal nature to a qualitatively different nature—human nature—can only be solved through a philosophy that relies on results obtained not only through biology, but also through psychology, linguistics, sociology and other sciences. The problem must be formulated with attention being paid to the relevant intermediate links, which are not taken into consideration by individual sciences. Orudzhev believes that Darwin's theory still (almost 150 years since the 1871 publication of The Descent of Man, and Selection in Relation to Sex) cannot prove the natural origin of man in the proper sense, because it does not depart from "pure biologism" in its understanding of human nature.

The naturalistic conception of humans, which has so far been unable to make the strictly logical shift from animals to humans themselves, and which sometimes argues that the problem lies in the absence of a "missing link" that is yet to be found, is mistaken. In fact, there is a "decisive link", which this conception does not in any way seek. This conception does not take account of the presence of the human capacity for a priori thought, the presence of which was proved by German classical philosophy in the person of Kant, who proceeded from the premise that it is humans that can think a priori, because they possess mind. Kant had no knowledge of Darwin's ideas and therefore did not deal with the problem of animal, a posteriori thought transforming into actual human, a priori thought. Plato raised the issue of apriorism with his concept of "anamnesis", and so, later on, did Leibniz, with his concept of "innate ideas". But Darwin himself, as a 19th-century Englishman, took the sensualist view, seeing sensation in absolute terms and viewing the capacity for abstraction as something of which for human mind was sufficient.

Orudzhev logically explains the emergence of human beings' a priori ability on the basis of the concept of the "accumulated past" that he introduced (which includes (i) a chaotic part; (ii) an organised part, in other words an ordered part; and finally (iii) a mode of thought in the relevant period (in a period in history, for example), which orders, "organises" the "accumulated past") and uses that to create an opportunity for new experience, logic and the creation of modes of thought in epochs. On the basis of these human abilities, of course, lies the capacity for creativity, ordering, or, as Nietzsche wrote, "the organisation of chaos". The "accumulated past", or the "third world", is not devoid of subject, as Popper suggested, humans are always "carrying it with them", as Bias argued, and collaborate with that past, "organising" it.

But how does the "accumulated past" actually arise? It arises from the capabilities of verbal language, which was given to the human race's ancestors as an instinct. Darwin himself suggested that language was given to humans as an instinct. At the time, this idea was adopted by a whole series of scientists, but now it has been convincingly substantiated by modern linguists, particularly Chomsky and Pinker, who advanced as one of their major theories the notion that one of language's properties is that it awakens a human being's creative abilities. Pinker highlights Chomsky's idea that brings language, in terms of its properties, into proximity with a priori thought, the significance of which is great in terms of understanding "the secret of the emergence of human nature". The independence of words from the specific properties of external objects, first of all, allows humans to create each sentence by means of "fundamentally new combinations of words, appearing for the first time in the history of the universe", and, second, from birth children carry a certain design, common to the grammars of all languages, a so-called "Universal Grammar", Pinker stresses, "which shows them how to identify syntactic models in the speech of their parents".

The synthesis of verbal language as the "origin" with the past as the substance of the new nature (human nature) produces the "accumulated past", without which humans could not possess the capacity for a priori thought. But how does the "accumulated past" make the human capacity for a priori thought a reality? Thanks to the Word (verbal language), humans retain a "multitude" of results from their experience (in hunting, gathering, interaction with other people etc., including experience that has no direct biological significance for their survival). This "accumulated past", which humans constantly "carry around with themselves", enables them to interact with elements of the past and synthesise elements of the "accumulated past" – elements which did not interact with one another at all, either previously or in human experience. That is how Kant's a priori synthesis arises, a fully-fledged apriorism typical of humans in the proper sense.

Incidentally, in the animal world, apriorism already exists in a partial, elementary form. If an animal, in contrast to a "dead" stone and other similar objects, failed to keep ahead of changes taking place in the external world, it would not be able to adapt to that world, and would be destroyed by a stronger predator, or by falling into a chasm, or by a stone falling down the mountainside. But animals possess "microapriorism", in the form of logical analogy, which enables them to react in different ways to the various processes and phenomena taking place around them. Analogy is the simplest rational form of thought, which enables animals, at the very least, to distinguish between "their own" and "the others", for example. During the Paleolithic period, humans already had the capacity for "half-apriorism", since, by using chips of stone, they could analytically separate sharp objects (prototype knives, chisels and other tools used to handle the carcasses of dead animals in order to extract the brain or obtain the animal's pelt etc.) from stones or dead animals.

A human being's new experience is created by the a priori method, irrespective of its scale. For example, according to Orudzhev, the three well-known stages of a human being's temporal existence can be characterised as the dominance of a human being's homogenous (mass) abilities in the first (primitive) stage, group abilities in the second (historical) stage; and individual, creative abilities in the third (post-historical) stage. All these changes took place gradually, of course, over the course of tens of thousands of years, as a result of the changing modes of thought that controlled the actions of human beings.

Orudzhev believes that, for example, all historical epochs are determined by new three-tier modes of thought, which include (i) concepts from general logic (ii) ethical concepts and (iii) the experiential, practical level, and these modes of thought are based on new concepts acquired through their a priori capacity. Humans are constantly interacting with their "third world", which they "carry with themselves", and so they are constantly "organising chaos". At this juncture it is worth recalling Albert Camus's remark that "every great reformer tries to create in history what Shakespeare, Cervantes, Moliere and Tolstoy knew how to create: a world always ready to satisfy the hunger for freedom and dignity which every man carries in his heart". Elsewhere, Camus draws our attention to the creative nature of human beings' a priori capacity, when he says that works of art present us with "an imaginary world which, however, constitutes a correction to the real world... The novel shapes fate using a pre-prepared mould. In this way, the novel competes with God's creation and at least temporarily triumphs over death.". As we see, both in the world of art and the world of real reforms, human beings are constantly creating, "organising chaos", lending it a form that reflects their perceptions, and over time, in the form of the reformers, reproducing these perceptions (or ideas) in reality. The same happens in everyday life, when human beings attempt to change the conditions in which they live, their relationships with other people etc.

From these points, Orudzhev draws out the internal meaning of history, which boils down to the gradual "exclusion" from human nature of what has been inherited from the first (primitive) stage of the temporal existence of human beings—principally, the chief animal instinct—the instinct of strength and weakness. "Displacement" occurs in four major stages (historical epochs, each of which is an integrative experience of it) that correspond to the four levels of civilization, based on: (i) written law (antiquity), (ii) common human ethics (Middle Ages), (iii) bourgeois equality and money as a universal measure of human activity (the modern age), and (iv) finally, the nascent information age, based increasingly on human beings' individual creative freedom (for further detail on the corresponding modes of human thought that define historical periods, see the two aforementioned books published in 2004 and 2009). As can be seen, the levels of civilization coincide in time with the historical epochs. During the third stage of temporal being (at the post-historical stage), according to Orudzhev, human nature is free from animal instincts, and that nature is now controlled by "the instinct of mind" (Hegel's term), which is specific to "human nature" and fully corresponds to it. In this stage of temporal being, social relations between people do not originate from inherited animal instincts (which in history have taken the form of wars, slavery, dictatorships etc.), but are based on friendship as a source of new ethical relations between people, as Aristotle would have said, had he not taken an absolute view of the perceptions of non-historical time that were typical of his period (see his "Nicomachean Ethics").

Orudzhev rejects the conception of the Utopians, who believe that "human nature" is unchanging, and he also rejects the opposite conception that the essence of a human being is identical to the historically changing "sum total of public relations", leading to the conclusion that apparently "human nature" in essence boils down to history, instead of lying at its basis, since history itself is part of human beings' integrative experience. According to Orudzhev, the concept of human temporal being is defined by the fact that human existence is principally determined not by economic, socio-political, or state factors, but by temporal factors, i.e. the time when humans started to emerge from the animal world and the extent to which humans subsequently overcame the animal world. The human mode of being characterises human attitudes to the past and human interaction with the past, since the past ( in forms language, thought, logic etc.), in contrast to what has happened in the past, always is in the present.

So, at the start of the 21st century, the problem of hominids transforming into humans in the proper sense of the phrase has acquired a philosophical explanation, on the basis of the discovery of the logic governing the development of the essence of human nature—mind.

In her review of Orudzhev's latest books, published in the Russian Academy of Sciences' leading philosophical journal, T.V.Kuznetsova, professor at the Faculty of Philosophy at Lomonosov Moscow State University, noted: "Now it can be said that, in Z.M.Orudzhev's book "Human Nature and the Sense of History", Z.M.Orudzhev has in rather convincing form provided a philosophical solution to the fundamental problem in philosophy, as formulated by Karl Jaspers".

== Selected publications ==
=== Books ===
- K. Marx and Dialectical Logic. Baku. "Azerneshr". 1964. (Russian edition).
- The Unity of Dialectic, Logic and Theory of Cognition in K. Marx's "Das Kapital". Baku. "Azerneshr". 1968. (Russian edition).
- Dialectics as a System. M., "Politizdat". 1973. (Russian edition).
- Dialectical Logic. Main Principles and Problems. M. "Politizdat". 1979. Co-authored. (Russian edition).
- La Dialectica como Sistema. (Editorial de ciencias sociales, ciudad de la Habana. 1978)
- La Dialectica como Sistema. (Departamento de editorial. Facultad de Filosofia y Letras. Universidad autonomia de Nuevo León. Monterrey. N.L. Mexico. 1979)
- La Dialectica como Sistema. (Editorial Nuestro Tiempo. S.A., Primera edition en Mexico: 1980)
- Dialektik als System. Zum Verhealtnis von Dialektik, Logik und Erkenntnistheorie. (VEB Deutscher Verlag der Wissenschaften. Berlin. 1979).
- The Mode of Thought in the Epoch. M., "URSS". 2004. (Russian edition).
- Human Nature and the Sense of History. M., Publishing house "Librocom". 2009. (Russian edition).

=== Articles ===
- The Logical and Historical in "Das Kapital". The chapter in the book: «Marx's "Das Kapital", Philosophy and the Present». M., "Nauka". 1968. (Russian edition).
- To the Question of the Structure of Dialectical Logic, "Philosophical Sciences" No 6 1971 (Russian edition).
- K.Marx and the Dialectical Logic of Hegel. In: "Philosophy of Hegel and the Present". M., Publishing house "Mysl". 1973. (Russian edition).
- The Problem of Proof in Dialectical Logic. In: "The Philosophy and the Present". M., "Science". 1976). (Russian edition).
- The Formal-Logical and Dialectical Contradiction. The Difference Between Structures. In: "Dialectical Contradiction". M., "Politizdat". 1979. (Russian edition).
- The Dialectical Contradiction in the Development of Cognition. Journal: "Questions of Philosophy" No 2 1979. Co-authored. (Russian edition).
- Reform in the Activity of the Socialist State. Journal: "Philosophical Sciences" No 3 1984. Co-authored. (Russian edition).
- Marxism, Humanism and Ecology. In: "The Question of Humanism. Challenges and Possibilities". Edited by David Coicoechea, John Luik and Tim Madigan. Prometheus Books. Buffalo, New York. 1991)
- Marxist Philosophy and Society of the Future. In: "Diverse Perspectives on Marxist Philosophy. East and West". Edited by Sara F. Luter, John J. Newmaier, and Howard L. Parsons. Greenwood Press. 1995. Papers presented to the 19th World Congress of Philosophy, held in Moscow, 23–28 August 1993)
- Philosophical Analysis of the Regional Politics of Russia. Journal: "Moscow State University Herald" No 4 1985 (Russian edition).
- Philosophy of the Past (Or the Conception of the Past but not in the Ordinary Sense). Journal: "Moscow State University Herald" No 3 2002. (Russian edition).
- Mode of Thought in the Epoch and the Historical Process. In: "The Epoch of Global Changes. The Experience of Philosophical Comprehension". Under the editorship of Prof T.I.Kostina. M. 2004. (Russian edition).
- Culture and Civilisation. Journal: "Moscow State University Herald" No 2 2005. Co-authored with Prof T.V.Kuznetsova. (Russian edition).
- Mode of Thought and the Principle of Apriorism. Journal: "Questions of Philosophy" No 5 2006. (Russian edition).
- Culture and Civilisation: New Aspects of an Old Problem. In: "Science and Education in the Interests of Sustainable Development". M. 2006. Co-authored with T.V. Kuznetsova. (Russian edition).
- Culture and Civilisation. "Moscow State University Herald" No 4 2007. Co-authored with Prof T.V. Kuznetsova. (Russian edition).
- To the Question of the Emergence of the Human Mind. Journal: "Questions of Philosophy". No 12 2009. (Russian edition).
