= Farman Salmanov =

Soviet geologist

- Azerbaijani: Fərman Salmanov
- Born: 28 July 1931; Morul, Shamkhor district, Azerbaijan SSR, Transcaucasian SFSR, Soviet Union
- Died: 31 March 2007 (aged 75); Moscow, Russian Federation
- Occupation: geologist

Farman Gurban oghlu Salmanov (Azerbaijani: Fərman Qurban oğlu Salmanov; Russian: Фарман Курбан оглы Салманов; July 28, 1931, Morul – March 31, 2007, Moscow) was an Azerbaijani geologist known for discovering extensive oil fields in Western Siberia in Tyumen Oblast in 1961.

== Biography ==
Farman Salmanov was born in the village of Morul of Shamkir District of Azerbaijan SSR in a family of farmers of Azerbaijani origin. After graduating from school with honors, he entered the Azerbaijan Industrial Institute and upon graduation was sent to explore oil in Kuzbass. He soon realized that there was no oil in Kuzbass, and decided to move with volunteers from his exploration team to Surgut in Siberia without the consent of the Soviet authorities. According to the doctrine prevailing at the time in the Soviet geological science Siberia was not considered an oil-bearing region. The authorities tried to initiate criminal prosecution of Salmanov, but had to give a post factum approval of his mission when his team threatened they would go on strike.

Salmanov struck oil on March 21, 1961, in the Megion field. He sent all his opponents similar telegrams: "Dear comrade, an oil fountain is gushing from the depth of 2,180 meters in Megion. Is it clear?" His opponents in the Soviet Ministry of Geology said that it was a natural anomaly and that the oil fountain would soon exhaust. When Salmanov struck the second oil reserve in Ust-Balyk, he sent a telegram to the 22nd Congress of the Communist Party of the Soviet Union to the Soviet leader Nikita Khrushchev: "I found oil. That's it." The Soviet leaders realized the importance of Salmanov's discoveries, and Siberian oil soon became the main driving force of Soviet economy and a primary source of hard currency for the Soviet budget.

Farman Salmanov spent fifty years in the oil-and-gas industry of the Soviet Union and Russia, and discovered or participated in the discovery of over one hundred fields, including such huge oil and gas reserves as Mamontovskoye, Megionskoye, Pravdinskoye, Ust-Balykskoye, Surgutskoye, Urengoyskoye, Yamburgskoye, etc. He was awarded the title of the Hero of Socialist Labor in 1966 and the Lenin Prize in 1970. From 1978 to 1987 Salmanov headed the Glavtyumengeology after Y.G. Ervier, an organization in charge of oil and gas exploration in Tyumen Oblast. In 1987–1991 he was the first deputy to the Minister of Geology of the USSR. Until his death, Salmanov was an adviser to the president of Russian Itera Gas Company. Farman Salmanov was doctor of geological-mineralogical sciences, a corresponding member of the Russian Academy of Sciences, the author of over 160 monographs and scientific works. He was an honorary citizen of Khanty-Mansi and Yamalo-Nenets Autonomous Okrugs, the city of Surgut, and the state of Texas. A number of feature and documentary films were dedicated to Salmanov's story.

Farman Salmanov died on March 31, 2007. He was buried in Moscow at the Vagankovo Cemetery.

== Legacy ==
Materials on the life and work of Salmanov are kept in museums of the Tyumen Region and the Khanty-Mansi Autonomous Area in Surgut.

In 2008, the youth scientific-practical conference, held by the Siberian Scientific Analytical Center, Tyumen, was named Salman Readings.

In memory of Farman Salmanov, monuments and busts were opened in Moscow, Baku, Surgut, Salekhard, Khanty-Mansiysk.

A street in Surgut, Nizhnevartovsk, an oil and gas condensate field and a motor ship was named in honor of Salmanov.

The name Farman Salmanov was assigned to the Tu-154M aircraft of UTair airlines, then to the Boeing 737-800 aircraft of the same company.

On August 29, 2013, a memorial board dedicated to Farman Salmanov was opened in Tyumen. The author of the memorial plaque, made of tinted bronze, is a member of the Union of Artists of Russia Zaur Rzayev.

In December 2018, it was announced that Surgut International Airport in Western Siberia would be named after Salmanov. This was the result of a nationwide vote on airport names across the country.

== Movie image ==
The events of life and the personality of Farman Salmanov formed the basis of the feature film “Risk Strategy” (1978) and the image of its main character Farid Askerov.

== Award and titles ==
- Hero of Socialist Labour (1966)
- Order of Lenin (1966)
- Order of the Red Banner of Labour (1971, 1976)
- Order of the October Revolution (1983)
- Winner of the Lenin Prize (1970)
- Winner of the IM Gubkin Award
- Honored Geologist of the Russian Federation
- Honored Worker of the Oil and Gas Industry
- Freeman of the Khanty-Mansiysk Autonomous Okrug
- Freeman of the Yamalo-Nenets Autonomous District
- Freeman of the city of Surgut (June 28, 1968)
- Freeman of the State of Texas (USA)
- Honorary Citizen of Jinzhou City (RC)

== Bibliography ==
Farman Salmanov is the author of more than 80 scientific papers on the problems of the formation and distribution of large oil and gas fields:

- FK Salmanov. Geological structure and conditions of formation of oil fields of the Surgut arch: dissertation for the degree of Candidate. geol.-mineral. sciences. Gorno-Pravdinsk, 1967. 218 p.
- Nesterov I. I., Salmanov F. K., Shpilman K. A. Oil and gas fields in Western Siberia. M.: Nedra, 1971. 463 p.
- FK Salmanov. Patterns of distribution and conditions for the formation of oil and gas deposits in the Mesozoic sediments of the Middle Priobye: Abstract of dissertation for the degree of Dr. geol.-mineral. sciences. Novosibirsk: IGiG SB AS USSR, 1972. 60 p.
- FK Salmanov. Patterns of distribution and conditions for the formation of oil and gas deposits. M.: Nedra, 1974. 280 p.
- Kontorovich A.E., Nesterov I.I., Salmanov F.K. and others. Geology of oil and gas in Western Siberia. M.: Nedra, 1975. 680 p.
- FK Salmanov. Acceleration of the search. M.: Nedra, 1985. 63 p.
- Salmanov F. K., Vysotsky V. I. China through the eyes of a geologist. M.: Nedra, 1990. 96 p.
- Salmanov FK. Life as a discovery. M.: RTK-Region, 2003. 410 p.
- FK Salmanov. I am a politician: thoughts of one of the creators of the country's fuel and energy power. M.: RTK-Region, 2006. 527.
