= Georgiy Mamedov =

Russian diplomat (born 1947)

- Георгий Мамедов
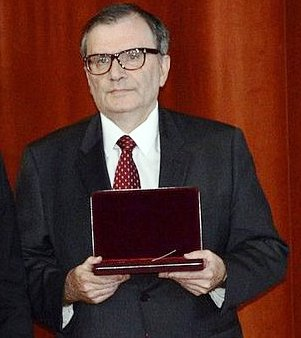
- Mamedov in 2014

Russian Ambassador to Canada
- In office 5 June 2003 – 24 October 2014
- President: Vladimir Putin; Dmitry Medvedev; Vladimir Putin
- Preceded by: Vitaly Churkin
- Succeeded by: Alexander Darchiev

Personal details
- Born: Georgiy Enverovich Mamedov; Гео́ргий Энве́рович Маме́дов; 9 September 1947 (age 79) Moscow, Soviet Union (now Russia)
- Education: Moscow State Institute of International Relations
- Awards: Honored Employee of the Diplomatic Service of the Russian Federation

Georgiy Enverovich Mamedov (Russian: Георгий Энверович Мамедов; born 9 September 1947) is a Russian diplomat of Azerbaijani descent, and one of Russia's foremost authorities on the United States and Canada. In the 1990s and the early 2000s, he was his country's chief interlocutor with the United States on such subjects as NATO, arms control and Kosovo.

Mamedov served as Russia's ambassador to Canada between 2003 and 2014.

== Biography ==
Georgiy Mamedov was born on September 9, 1947, in Moscow. His father, Enver Nazimovich Mamedov, had been a diplomat for a few years, and was to spend most of his later career working for the Soviet mass media in a variety of positions, including that of the Deputy Chairman of the State Committee for Radio and Television in 1962–1985, directly in charge of Soviet television from 1970 to 1985.

Georgiy Mamedov graduated in 1970 from the Moscow State Institute of International Relations. He then joined the Institute for U.S.A. and Canada Studies in 1970 and became a protégé of the institute's founder, Georgi Arbatov, the leading Soviet specialist on the United States at the time.

After entering diplomatic service in 1972, Mamedov was posted at the Soviet Embassy in Washington from 1972 to 1973 and again from 1977 to 1981. While in Washington from 1977 to 1981 he impressed the Americans, who called him "George," but he was also suspected of working with the KGB.

In 1989–90, Mamedov served as the first deputy director, in 1990–91, the director, of the US and Canada Desk of the Ministry of Foreign Affairs of the USSR.

In 1991, Mamedov became Russia's Deputy Minister of Foreign Affairs in charge of the relationship with the countries of the Americas, and occupied this position until 2003. In June 2003, he was appointed as Ambassador of Russia to Canada.

It often fell to Mamedov to smooth over the thorniest Russia-USA disputes. He helped persuade Washington to proceed with NATO expansion slowly, and reassured the Americans when President Boris Yeltsin sent tanks to besiege the Russian parliament during the 1993 Russian constitutional crisis. He helped broker a deal under which Ukraine gave up all the nuclear weapons it had inherited after the breakup of the Soviet Union.

Alexander Vershbow, a former U.S. ambassador to Moscow, first met Mamedov in the 1980s; Vershbow describes Mamedov as "a real problem solver, somebody who's always defended their interests quite aggressively—and volubly—but has been a good partner. Every U.S. ambassador who's dealt with him has found him to be a guy who could get things done."

Georgiy Mamedov holds a Ph.D. in history and speaks English and Swedish in addition to Russian. He is married and has two adult children, a son and daughter.

== Views on the Iraq war ==
Prior to the U.S. invasion of Iraq, Mamedov declared in an interview with ITAR-TASS that the United States were making a "tragic error": "If Washington decides to ignore the UN Security Council, to violate the UN Charter and invade Iraq, this will be a tragic error from the side of the U.S.A.... Russia categorically rejects any ultimatums regarding Iraq.... In Russia we consider that Iraq constitutes neither a threat to the U.S.A, nor to the international community, nor to its neighbors.... Russia will not participate in a campaign of pressure or threats, directed at changing the regime in Iraq." When asked what Russia would do if there were a U.S. military operation, Mamedov replied: "Russia will not launch an anti-American campaign, but will try its utmost to return the situation to a proper legal basis. We will not gloat over a tragic mistake by the United States."
