= Aleksei Rodionov (diplomat) =

Soviet-Ukrainian diplomat

Aleksei Alekseyevich Rodionov (Russian: Алексей Алексеевич Родионов; 27 March 1922 – 18 May 2013) was a Soviet diplomat who served as the Ambassador of the Soviet Union to Pakistan from 1971 until 1974 and the Ambassador of the Soviet Union to Canada from 1983 to 1990.

He is notable for his appointment that saw his involvement during the war with India in 1971 when the Soviet Union directed a secret message to President Yahya Khan to come up with a peaceful political settlement for the East Pakistan to avoid going through the conflict with India. The now-declassified Rodionov message ultimately warned Pakistan that "it will [be] embarking [on] a suicidal course if it escalates tensions in the subcontinent."

Rodionov reportedly had an acrimonious meeting with President Yahya Khan a week after the Indo-Soviet treaty was signed. During his tenure, the Soviet Union's relations with Yahya Khan had met with demise but he worked towards repairing relations with Bhutto in 1971 when he lobbied in the Soviet Union for the establishment of the Pakistan Steel Mills. On 24 January 1972, he delivered an official invitation to then-President Zulfikar Ali Bhutto in Karachi to pay a state visit to Soviet Union that took place in 1974. In 1974, Rodionov was recalled from his posting as Soviet ambassador to Pakistan in order to take up other duties. Soviet Ambassador Sarvar Azimov had succeeded him who stayed until 1980.

== Awards and honors ==
- Order of the Badge of Honour
- Order of Friendship of Peoples
- Order of the October Revolution
- Four Orders of the Red Banner of Labour
- Jubilee Medal "In Commemoration of the 100th Anniversary of the Birth of Vladimir Ilyich Lenin"
- Medal "For the Development of Virgin Lands"
- Medal "In Commemoration of the 850th Anniversary of Moscow"

== See also ==
- Indo-Pakistani War of 1971
- Timeline of the Bangladesh Liberation War
- Military plans of the Bangladesh Liberation War
- Mitro Bahini order of battle
- Pakistan Army order of battle, December 1971
- Evolution of Pakistan Eastern Command plan
- 1971 Bangladesh genocide
- Operation Searchlight
- Indo-Pakistani wars and conflicts
- Military history of India
- List of military disasters
- List of wars involving India
