= Alexander Gordon (historian) =

Alexander V. Gordon
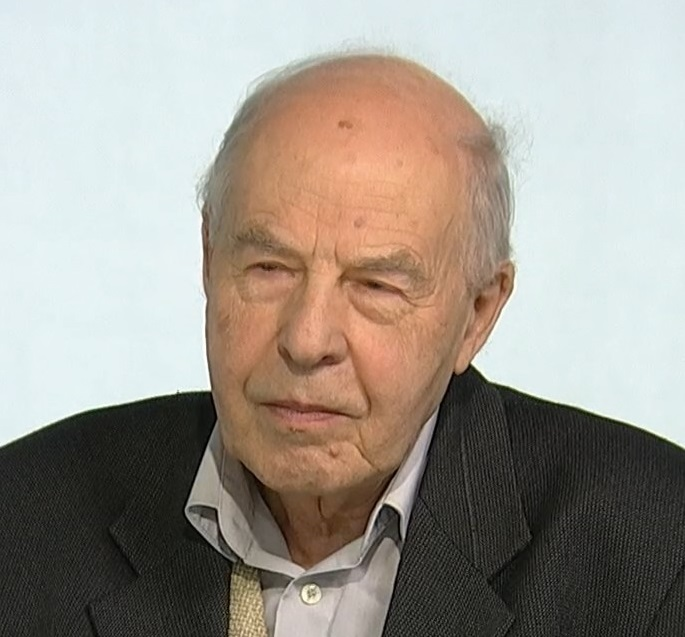
- Gordon, 2022
- Born: 1 October 1937; Dnepropetrovsk, USSR
- Education: B.A., Saint Petersburg State University, 1959; Ph.D., Institute of World History, Russian Academy of Sciences, 1968; Doctor of Sciences Doktor nauk (second doctorate), Institute of Asian and African Countries, Moscow State University, 1991
- Occupations: Head of Asian and African Countries Division
- Employer(s): Institute of Scientific Information on Social Sciences of the Russian Academy of Sciences (INION), Russian Academy of Sciences, Moscow
- Awards

Alexander V. Gordon (Russian: Гордон, Александр Владимирович) is a Russian historian, historiographer, socio-anthropologist, and culturologist. He is the author of important works on European history, modern civilization, peasant studies, historiography. His major areas of research are the history and historiography of French revolution, mass-movements in traditional and modern cultures, and peasant culture. Through his work at the Institute of Scientific Information on Social Sciences of the Russian Academy of Sciences, he has considerably affected the exchange of information between Western and Russian academies and societies. He also authored several popular books on history and culture.

== Early life and education ==
Gordon was born in Dnepropetrovsk (USSR, currently in Ukraine) in 1937, in the family of a military engineer. The family moved to Slonim (USSR, currently in Belarus), where Gordon graduated from high school in 1954. Gordon had successfully passed difficult entrance exams and was admitted to the Department of History at Saint Petersburg State University. He graduated in 1959, majoring in history, with the specialist diploma (equivalent of Bachelor of Arts). His development as an historian was influenced by such Soviet historians as S.N.Valk, Ya.M.Zacher, and E.E.Pechuro. He spent next three years at an obligatory position as a school history teacher in Kaliningrad (in Moscow region)

== Academic career ==
=== Writing and research ===
==== Institute of Scientific Information on Social Sciences of the Russian Academy of Sciences, Russian Academy of Sciences, Moscow, 1961-currently ====
Upon finishing his work term as a school teacher, Gordon obtained a junior researcher position the Fundamental Library for Social Sciences (in Russian, Фундаментальная Библиотека по Общественным Наукам, ФБОН or FBON) a special research body of the Academy of the Sciences of the USSR. It was a closed-for-the-public library of the Academy, which doubled as a research think-tank, studying Western humanities and social sciences. In the 1968, this library was incorporated into the INION, and started publishing various research materials. Gordon has been working there since 1961, raising from the position of junior researcher to the top position of head researcher and the head of the Asian and African Countries Division. He published his memoirs about his work there.

At this time, most modern foreign literature in the humanities was inaccessible even to scholars in the Soviet Union. It was considered to be propaganda, or distorted description of reality, promoting capitalist ideas. While the most important foreign books were acquired by a selected few major Soviet libraries, including FBON, they were often placed into special storage, and "access to materials from Special Storage was conditional on special permission: a person had to either have the corresponding level of security access or to have a written permission from the First Department from person's job." (Spetskhran). Very limited number of scholars were able to obtain permission to work at the Fundamental Library for Social Sciences, and even of those, many had poor command of foreign languages.

One of paradoxal phenomena of the Soviet scientific landscape of that time were so-called "review collections of INION", which contained Russian-language analytical reviews of the freshest crop of the Western thought. The system, on one side, was barring scholars from first-hand access to foreign literature, on the other side, it fed to them the essence of the latest Western ideas in Russian language. Naturally, most of these collection carried "confidential" note of them, so they were a part of Spetskhran. However, some of the scholars, who got access to these "confidential" titles, allowed to copy them, which brought to life of sub-culture of scholarly Samizdat. These Samizdat "review collections" enjoyed great popularity in scholar circles, and hugely affected development of Soviet humanities, against the will of ideological hardliners. Some of most popular authors of these analytical reviews became "scholarly stars" in the USSR, having a cult-like following; especially, outside of Moscow, where original texts were practically inaccessible.

Gordon has been one of those stars. Writing analytical reviews is a scholarly art in itself; it required even more effort in Soviet times, when authors could not directly praise Western theorists or ideas. They had to review them, looking through the glasses of marxist ideology. Many of reviewers, including Gordon, themselves shared at least some flavour of that ideology, and this simplified their task. However, even under the guise of marxist critique, they managed to convey to readers the gist of modern Western thought. It was often up to the reviewers to select books from recent acquisitions; therefore, their choices were indirectly forming general conceptual landscape of the humanities in the USSR in the 60s-80s of the last century. Beside stand-alone reviews, published as books (and considered to be academical works in their own right), there were special review journals, published on bi-monthly basis, and containing shorter reviews of important works. The division of INION, where Gordon worked, and whose head he eventually became, was responsible for publishing one of these journals, devoted to research on Asian and African countries.

The situation changed after the crash of the USSR and ensuing economical chaos, when inflow of Western literature almost stopped due to lack of funds. It changed again with advent of the internet that provided online direct access to Western academia. However, it did not eliminate production of analytical reviews, which now are playing their proper role as a bridge of ideas between Russian and Western academia. Gordon produced a few important analytical books over this period.

==== Post-graduate studies at the Institute of History, the Academy of the Sciences of the USSR, 1961-1965 ====
In 1961, a prominent Soviet historian and anthropologist, Boris Porshnev has encouraged Gordon to apply for a part-time post-graduate student position at the Institute of History (later - Institute of World History) of the Academy of Sciences of the USSR, in Moscow. At this time, his main interest was French history, and especially, the period of French Revolution. He wrote his dissertation on the subject of "Establishing of the Montagnard rule", under guidance of Albert Manfred and Victor Dalin, and defended it in 1968 at the Institute.

==== Turn to mass-movements in research direction, 1968-1977 ====
Defending a dissertation on French history did not bring a relevant research position at the Institute of History. At this time, Gordon was encouraged by his manager at the Asian ad African Countries Division at the INION to continue his research of critical moments in mass-movements in the third-world area. Gordon was attracted by teachings of the prominent figure in anti-colonial and national liberation movement of 1960s, Frantz Fanon. As a result, he wrote a book that presented to Russian-speaking community the new wave of revolutionary thinking. The book on Fanon became a hit in left-leaning circles of young Soviet intelligentsia. Under the guise of extolling anti-colonial marxist hero, this book introduced into Soviet ideological landscape fresh new left ideas, adding more cracks to already damaged, after Khrushchev Thaw, ideological armor of Party hardliners.

Turning to studying Third-world mass-movements did not mean, though, that Gordon completely abandoned French history. He continued working on French historiography, and later returned to France with a new research interest in peasant studies. As well, he published books of popular interest on French history.

==== Peasant Studies, 1977-currently ====
Proclaiming himself a Marxist, Fanon, acting in Third-world countries, which were missing large bodies of revolutionary proletariat, was looking for another class that could act as the Marxist "subject of revolution". Probably following Mao Zedong, who discovered "revolutionary potential in peasantry" in 1920s, he proclaimed peasantry a revolutionary factor in national liberation and anti-colonial movements. Gordon started research in this direction, and this led him to peasant studies (see The Journal of Peasant Studies) and, eventually, switching from Marxist's paradigm to civilizational one, following steps of Arnold J. Toynbee and later Samuel P. Huntington. He was mostly inspired by ideas and anthropological field studies of such American researchers, as John Embree. In the Soviet ideological landscape, he was pioneering the idea of peasantry as a "subject of history", which brought a lot of critiques both from left and right camps.

Gordon's studies led to defending his second doctorate of Doktor Nauk, titled "The Asian Peasantry: Historical subject, cultural tradition, and social community", at the Institute of Asian and African Countries in Moscow, as well to publishing a few monographs.

=== Teaching and lecturing ===
2007-2008 - lectures at Russian State University for the Humanities: "French Historical Tradition"

=== Memoirs ===
Gordon recently published a few scholarly memoirs, initially, "ФБОН-ИНИОН. Воспоминания и портреты. Вып. 2" ("Fundamental Library of the Russian Academy of Sciencies: Memoirs and Portraits of my colleagues", in Russian) in 2017 and then "Историки железного века" ("Historians of the Iron Age", in Russian) in 2018. These are not biographical books, but conceptual description of how Soviet historiography developed in 1930-1980s, through biographical portraits of his teachers and colleagues, and academic intricacies and intrigues in the humanities in the USSR.

== Awards and honors ==
Order "For Merit to the Fatherland", II class (2022-01-20)

== Selected works ==
=== Books ===
- Гордон, Александр (1977). Проблемы национально-освободительной борьбы в творчестве Франца Фанона. М.: «Наука». (in Russian)
- Гордон, Александр (1988). Падение жирондистов: Народное восстание в Париже 31 мая - 2 июня 1793 года. М.: «Наука». ISBN 9785020089358. (in Russian)
- Гордон, Александр (1988). Вопросы типологии крестьянских обществ Азии: научно аналитический обзор дискуссий американских этнографов о социальной организации и межличностных отношениах в тайской деревне. М.: «ИНИОН РАН». (in Russian)
- Гордон, Александр (1989). Крестьянство Востока: Исторический субъект, культурная традиция, социальная общность. М.: «Наука». (in Russian)
- Гордон, Александр (1990). Город в современном Афро-Азиатском мире. М.: «ИНИОН РАН». (in Russian)
- Гордон, Александр (1994). Современный японский корпоративизм: научно-аналитический обзор. М.: «ИНИОН РАН». (in Russian)
- Гордон, Александр (1995). Крестьянство и рынок: научно-аналитический обзор. М.: «ИНИОН РАН». (in Russian)
- Гордон, Александр (1996). Новое время как тип цивилизации: научно-аналитический обзор. М.: «ИНИОН РАН». (in Russian)
- Гордон, Александр (1998). Цивилизация нового времени между мир-культурой и культурным ареалом: Европа и Азия в XVII-XX вв. : научно-аналитический обзор. М.: «ИНИОН РАН». ISBN 9785248001552. (in Russian)
- Гордон, Александр (2005). Власть и революция: Советская историография Великой французской революции. 1918—1941. Саратов: «Научная книга». ISBN 9785938888722. (in Russian)
- Гордон, Александр (2009). Великая французская революция в советской историографии. М.: «Наука». (in Russian)
- Гордон, Александр (2013). Историческая традиция Франции. М.: «Контект-Пресс». ISBN 9785987121245. (in Russian)
- Гордон, Александр (2017). ФБОН-ИНИОН. Воспоминания и портреты. Вып. 2. М.: «ИНИОН РАН». ISBN 9785987121245. (in Russian)
- Гордон, Александр (2018). Историки железного века. М.: «ИНИОН РАН». (in Russian)

.

=== Dissertation ===
Doktor Nauk dissertation (second doctorate), "Eastern Peasantry: Historical Subject, Cultural Tradition, Social Unity":

Гордон, Александр (1991). Крестьянство Востока : Исторический субъект, культурная традиция, социальная общность : диссертация (Thesis). М. (in Russian)
