= General Directorate for the Protection of State Secrets in the Press =

Official censorship and sensitive information handling agency in the Soviet Union

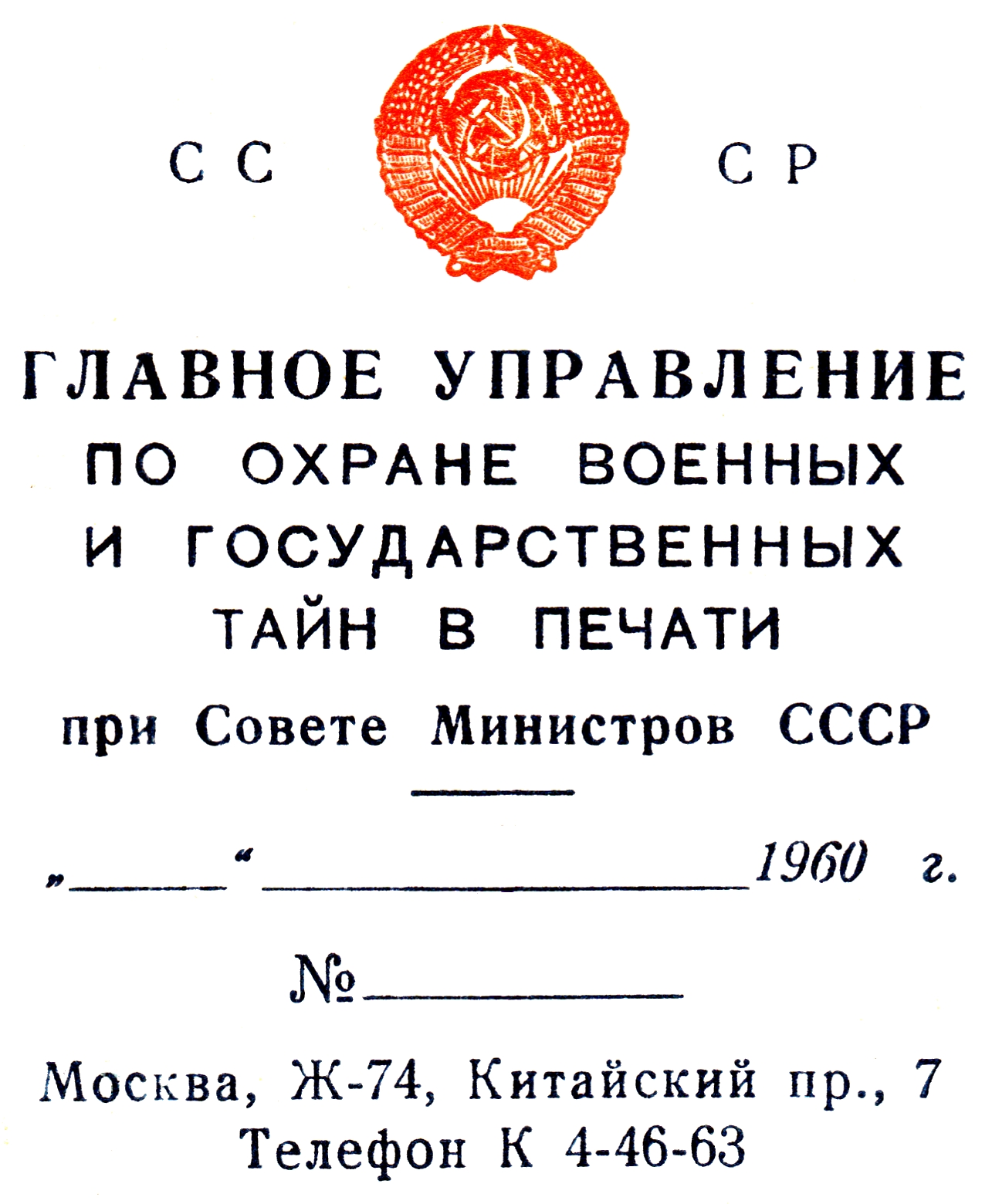
USSR-censor-1960

Main Directorate for the Protection of State Secrets in the Press under the Council of Ministers of the USSR (Russian: Главное управление по охране государственных тайн в печати при СМ СССР) was the official censorship and state secret protection organ in the Soviet Union. The censorship agency was established in 1922 under the name "Main Administration for Literary and Publishing Affairs at the RSFSR Narkompros", abbreviated as Glavlit (Главлит). The latter term was in semiofficial use until the dissolution of the Soviet Union.

Since the word "Glavlit" hints at "literature", the organization is often confused with Goskomizdat, which performed another type of censorship: it controlled the political content in fiction, poetry, etc.

== Chronology of names ==
- 1922: Main Administration for Literary and Publishing Affairs under the People's Commissariat of Education of the RSFSR (Главное управление по делам литературы и издательств при Наркомате просвещения РСФСР):
- 1946: Administration for the Protection of Military and State Secrets in the Press under the USSR Council of Ministers. (управление по охране военных и государственных тайн в печати при СМ СССР)
- 1953: Main Administration for the Protection of Military and State Secrets in the Press under the USSR Council of Ministers. (Главное управление по охране военных и государственных тайн в печати при СМ СССР)
- 1966: Main Directorate for the Protection of State Secrets in the Press under the USSR Council of Ministers. (Главное управление по охране государственных тайн в печати при СМ СССР:)

== Functions ==
The function of Glavlit was to prevent publications of information that could compromise state secrets in books, newspapers and other printed matter, as well as in radio and TV broadcasting.

There existed a special list of kinds of information forbidden for publication in sources open for the general public. Initially there were three major categories of secret information: military, economical, and "other". In later lists these were detailed further, e.g., "finance", "politics", "science and engineering", etc. were added. The first version of the list was decreed on October 13, 1921, before the creation of Glavlit, when censorship was a duty of a department of Vecheka. This list was updated several times. There were the following categories of secrecy: "top secret", "secret", and "not for disclosure".

Historian Michael McConnell - expert in the Bolshevik Consolidation of Power - noted that "Glavlit were ruthless in their enforcement of media censorship, having largely repressive implications for opposing parties and ideologies".

In addition, for the purposes of the law the secrets were classified into "state secrets" (secrets related to the overall functioning of the state), "military secrets", and "official secrets" (secrets related to immediate functioning of an office or enterprise).

Glavlit performed its functions via regional offices. In the late Soviet Union, at institutions and enterprises the immediate censorship was performed by the so-called First Departments controlled by KGB. In fact, tight cooperation of Soviet secret services and Glavlit was unbroken from the very beginning.

== Heads ==
Name	Start of powers	End of term
Nikolai Leonidovich Meshcheryakov	June 6, 1922	October 23, 1922
Pavel Lebedev-Poliansky	October 24, 1922	July 1931
Boris Mikhailovich Volin	July 1931	1935
Sergey Borisovich Ingulov	1935	December 16, 1937
Alexander Stepanovich Samokhvalov	December 17, 1937	January 12, 1938
Nikolay Georgievich Sadchikov	January 13, 1938	1946
Konstantin Kirillovich Omelchenko	1946	March 5, 1957
Pavel Konstantinovich Romanov	March 6, 1957	1965
Alexey Petrovich Okhotnikov	1965	17 August 1966
Pavel Konstantinovich Romanov	August 18, 1966	July 1986
Vladimir Alekseevich Boldyrev	July 1986	October 24, 1991

== Related organizations ==
- Goskomizdat
- First Department (also known as "secret department")
- USSR State Technical Commission - Commission for Counteracting Foreign Engineering Intelligences
- Military censorship was handled by the military counterintelligence of the Soviet Army.

== See also ==
- Censorship in the Soviet Union
- Eastern Bloc media and propaganda
