= Censorship in the Soviet Union =

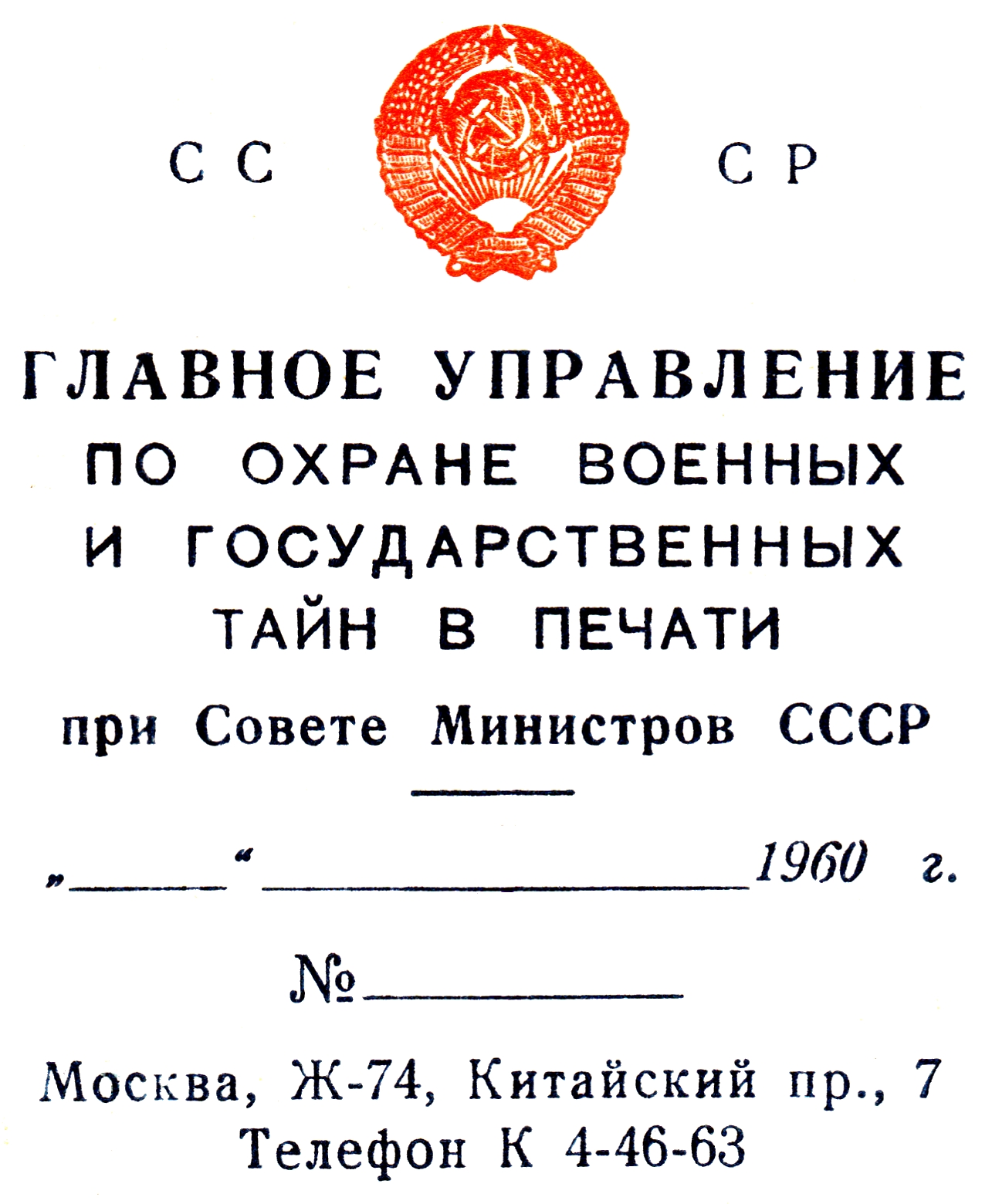
Glavlit form, 1960

Censorship in the Soviet Union was pervasive and strictly enforced.

Censorship was performed in two main directions:

- State secrets were handled by the General Directorate for the Protection of State Secrets in the Press (also known as Glavlit), which was in charge of censoring all publications and broadcasting for state secrets
- Censorship, in accordance with the official ideology and politics of the Communist Party was performed by several organizations:
  - Goskomizdat censored all printed matter: fiction, poetry, etc.
  - Goskino, in charge of cinema
  - Gosteleradio, in charge of radio and television broadcasting
  - The First Department in many agencies and institutions, such as the State Statistical Committee (Goskomstat), was responsible for assuring that state secrets and other sensitive information only reached authorized hands.

== Destruction of printed matter ==
The Soviet government implemented mass destruction of pre-revolutionary and foreign books and journals from libraries. Only "special collections" (spetskhran), accessible by special permit granted by the KGB, contained old and "politically incorrect" material. Libraries were registered and an inspectorate set up to ensure compliance; items regarded as harmful were weeded from the collections. Towards the end of Soviet rule, perestroika led to loosened restrictions on publishing.

Soviet books and journals also disappeared from libraries according to changes in Soviet history. Often, Soviet citizens preferred to destroy politically incorrect publications and photos because those connected to them frequently suffered persecution, such as in the case of persecution of Christians.

After the arrest of Lavrentiy Beria in 1953, all subscribers to the second edition (1950–1958) of the Great Soviet Encyclopedia obtained a page to replace the one containing the Lavrentiy Beria article; the new page extended information on George Berkeley.

== Soviet censorship of literature ==
Works of print such as the press, advertisements, product labels, and books were censored by Glavlit, an agency established on June 6, 1922, ostensibly to safeguard top secret information from foreign entities but in reality to remove material the Soviet authorities did not like. From 1932 until 1952, the promulgation of socialist realism was the target of Glavlit in bowdlerizing works of print, while anti-Westernization and Soviet nationalism were common tropes for that goal. To limit peasant revolts over collectivization, themes involving shortages of food were expunged. In the 1932 book Russia Washed in Blood, a Bolshevik's harrowing account of Moscow's devastation from the October Revolution contained the description, "frozen rotten potatoes, dogs eaten by people, children dying out, hunger," but was promptly deleted. Also, excisions in the 1941 novel Cement were made by eliminating Gleb's spirited exclamation to English sailors: "Although we're poverty-stricken and are eating people on account of hunger, [still] we have Lenin."

As peasant uprisings defined pre-World War II Soviet censorship, nationalism defined the period during the war. Defeats of the Red Army in literature were forbidden, as were depictions of trepidation in Soviet military characters. Pressure from state-run Pravda prompted authors like Alexander Alexandrovich Fadeyev to redact a section in The Young Guard, where a child reads in the eyes of a dying Russian sailor the words "We are crushed."

With the start of the Cold War, a curse on anti-Westernization was proclaimed, mirroring the American Second Red Scare to some extent. For instance, in the 1950 edition of The Ordeal of Sevastopol, censors made over three hundred cuts, screening the book's references to Frenchmen as "a people of very lively imagination", and the chivalrous treatments which the French gave to Russian prisoners—such as eating in the passenger's lounge and being given a hundred francs per month—were extracted from the text. Historically, Russia has been technologically inferior to the West, which is demonstrated by Glavlit editing out a section of Sevastopol which enviously describes London's technological accomplishments in flattering detail. Religious intolerance and atheism was another goal of post-World War II censorship, and was an extension of anti-Westernization. In the children's novel Virgin Soil Upturned, references to God making mist out of tears shed by the poor and hungry were rescinded.

The "Khrushchev Thaw", beginning in 1953 with Stalin's death, brought some liberalization of censorship laws, and greater liberty to the authors writing during this time. Glavlit's authority to censor literature decreased after they became attached to the USSR Council of Ministers in 1953. The nascence of de-Stalinization—the government's remission of Stalin's policies—is evident by censors replacing his name in For the Power of the Soviets, with words like "the Party," or "the Supreme Commander." Anti-Westernization was also suppressed, and in 1958, Sevastopol became divested of cuts meant to hide the West's technological advancement and Russia's backwardness. When Solzhenitsyn's One Day in the Life of Ivan Denisovich, a novel about a prisoner's brutal experience in the gulag, was released to the public in 1962, it was clear that socialist realism was disappearing. However, censorship was not completely absent from this era. Emmanuil Kazakevich's 1962 novel, Spring on the Oder, was posthumously injected in 1963 with descriptions of supposed American bigotry, selfishness, and racism, which was not in the novel originally. These examples of anti-Westernization indicate that works were expurgated for propaganda, but censorship still declined with Khrushchev's de-Stalinization.

== Censorship of images ==
Repressed persons were routinely removed not only from texts, but also from photos, posters and paintings.

== Soviet censorship of film ==
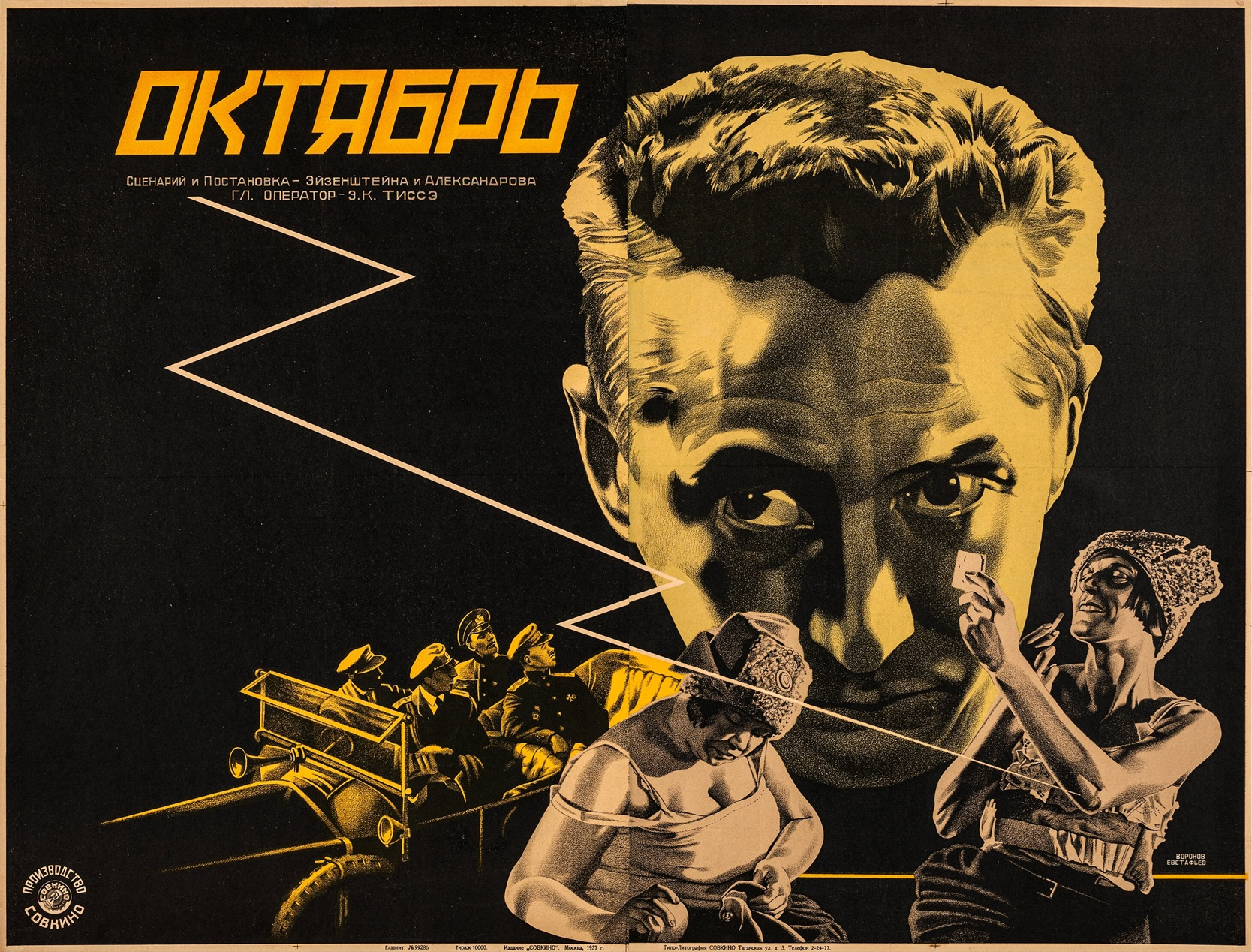
An original poster for October: Ten Days That Shook the World (1928), withdrawn from circulation for featuring the exiled revolutionary Leon Trotsky.

Censorship of film was commonplace since the USSR's inception. Beginning with the Russian Civil War (1917–1922), censoring film effectively advanced socialist realism, a mode of art production that positively portrays socialism and constituents of socialist nations. As propaganda tools directed at the masses—particularly the illiterate—themes of anti-Westernization and nationalism depicted socialist realism in films by negatively portraying elements of capitalist countries while positively depicting the Soviet Union. Elements of anti-Westernization included censoring religion and technological superiority, while signs of weakness in the Soviet military, like lost battles or frightened soldiers, were expurgated to further nationalistic goals. Film censorship peaked during the rule of Stalin (1924–1953).

Acting as the chief censor for films, Stalin was demanding meticulous revisions in a way befitting his interpretation, as if a co-author. One famous letter Stalin wrote to Alexander Dovzhenko pertained to The Great Citizen, a film about the Moscow show trials. Stalin's letter made several intrusive revisions on the characters, props, and vital scenes such that the entire film needed restructuring. More moderate cases were recorded, such as a picture by Ivan Pyryev, where Stalin only changed the title from Anka to The Party Card. However, movies which Stalin thought did not cohere with socialist realism were denied being released to the public; The Party Card was not such a film. This picture's screenplay was written during the time of a national campaign to renew individual party cards, and losing one amounted to a serious lack of Soviet discipline. Anka, the main character, has her card stolen by her lover, who is the surreptitious son of a kulak.

Kulaks were farmers resisting Stalin's crop requisition, and Anka's lover uses the party card for iniquitous purposes. In the final scene of the movie, she confronts him at gunpoint and, after he ignominiously begs forgiveness, she has him arrested by the authorities. By vilifying kulaks, Stalin aimed to diminish public sympathy for them. Socialist realism is promoted since, at the end of the movie, her loyalty to the party takes precedence over her romantic feelings; therefore, Stalin approved its production. However, not all films earned his approval.

One example is the 1940 film, The Law of Life, which was retracted from cinemas after ten days because it negatively portrayed a Komsomol leader by depicting him as hypocritical and abusing his power. Stalin organized a military tribunal which castigated the scenarist Aleksandr Avdeenko, accusing him of inaccurate representations of Soviet reality. While nothing was said of the director, Avdeenko was jettisoned from the party. However, directors were not always spared, as in the case of Margarita Barskaia. Her film Father and Son features a factory director who prioritizes his work over educating his son, Boris. Portraying Boris as an unhappy child and the father—a war hero—as a slothful parent was regarded as slanderous by a film reviewer. After her movie was removed from cinemas, Barskaia either committed suicide on 23 July 1939 following a meeting where she was excommunicated from the film-making profession, or was arrested and died in a gulag camp.

While Glavlit censored literature, Stalin micro-managed the film industry. He made "recommendations" on what should be included, edited, or deleted entirely. If ignored, similar consequences to those that befell Margarita were meted out. However, while he was obsessed with films, Stalin was uneducated on film production. Due to this ignorance, Stalin thought of the director as a mere technician who carried out instructions. Therefore, he dictated that camera angles should not be shot from below, or above the actor, but always at eye level. Stalin's callowness over the importance of the director's work was of great benefit to the filmmakers since, "with few exceptions, they survived."

The centrality of Stalin in film censorship lasted to his death in 1953, but the strictness of Soviet censorship did not survive him. Khrushchev succeeded Stalin as the USSR's ruler, and articulated de-Stalinization in his secret speech to the 20th Congress of the Communist Party of the Soviet Union. At this point, censorship finally began to diminish; this was known as the "Khrushchev Thaw." Film output grew to 20 pictures in 1953, 45 in 1954, and 66 in 1955. Movies now introduced themes that were formerly considered taboo, like conflicted characters. In the 1959 film Ballad of a Soldier, Alyosha, the main character, experiences a conflict between his lover and his obligations to the military. The off-screen text at the end of the film reads, "He could have become a worker…grown wheat and adorned the earth with gardens. But all he managed in his short life was to become a soldier." While restrictions on film still pervaded during the "Khrushchev Thaw", they were significantly fewer than under Stalin.

== Translations ==
Translations of foreign publications were often produced in a truncated form, accompanied with extensive corrective footnotes. For example, in the 1976 Russian translation of Basil Liddell Hart's History of the Second World War content, such as the Soviet treatment of its satellite states, many other Western Allies' efforts (e.g. Lend-Lease), the Soviet leadership's mistakes and failures, criticism of the Soviet Union, and other content, were censored out.

== Control over information ==
All media in the Soviet Union throughout its history was controlled by the state, including television and radio broadcasting, newspaper, magazine, and book publishing. This was achieved by state ownership of all production facilities, thus making all those employed in media state employees. This extended to the fine arts, including the theater, opera, and ballet. Art and music were controlled by state ownership of distribution and performance venues.

Censorship was also utilized in cases where performances did not meet with the favor of the Soviet leadership, with newspaper campaigns against offending material and sanctions applied through party-controlled professional organizations.

In the case of book publishing, a manuscript had to pass censorship and the decision of a state-owned publishing house to publish and distribute the book. Books which met with official approval and favor, for example, the collected speeches of Leonid Brezhnev, were printed in vast quantities while less favored literary material was published in limited numbers and not distributed widely, or not published at all.

Possession and use of copying machines was tightly controlled in order to hinder production and distribution of samizdat, i.e. self-published books and magazines that were banned by the Soviet state. Possession of even a single samizdat manuscript, such as a book by Andrei Sinyavsky, was a serious crime which involved "a visit from the KGB." Another outlet for works, which were censored by the authorities, was publishing abroad, although smuggling books to the West was dangerous.

It was the practice of libraries in the Soviet Union to restrict access to back issues of journals and newspapers more than three years old.

Historical falsification of political events such as the October Revolution and the Brest-Litovsk Treaty became a distinctive element of Stalin's regime. A notable example is the 1938 publication, History of the Communist Party of the Soviet Union (Bolsheviks), in which the history of the governing party was significantly altered and revised including the importance of the leading figures during the Bolshevik revolution. Retrospectively, Lenin's primary associates such as Zinoviev, Trotsky, Radek and Bukharin were presented as "vacillating", "opportunists" and "foreign spies" whereas Stalin is depicted as the chief discipline during this revolution. However, in reality, Stalin was considered a relatively unknown figure with secondary importance at the time of the event. In his book, The Stalin School of Falsification, Leon Trotsky cited a range of historical documents such as party speeches, meeting minutes, and suppressed texts such as Lenin's Testament. He argued that the Stalinist faction routinely distorted political events, forged a theoretical basis for irreconcilable concepts such as the notion of "Socialism in One Country" and misrepresented the views of opponents through an array of employed historians alongside economists to justify policy manoeuvering and safeguarding its own set of material interests.

=== Jamming of foreign radio stations ===
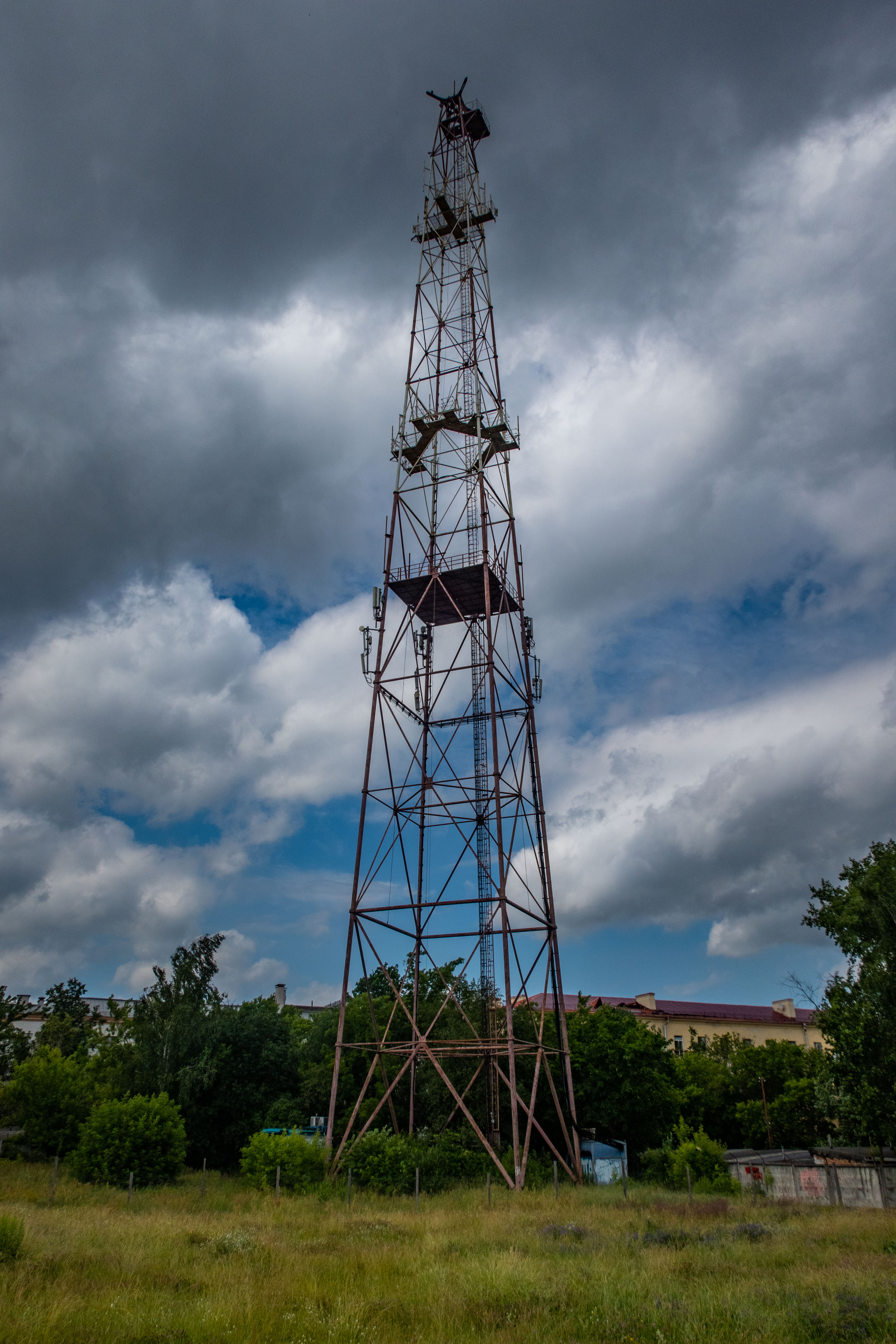
Soviet-era jamming tower in Minsk, Belarus

Due to the appearance of foreign radio stations broadcasting in Russian territory and their immunity from censorship, as well as the appearance of a large number of shortwave receivers, massive jamming of these stations was applied in the USSR using high-power radio-electronic equipment. It continued for almost 60 years until the end of the Cold War. The Soviet radio censorship network was the most extensive in the world.

All information related to radio jamming and usage of corresponding equipment was considered a state secret. On the eve of the 1980 Summer Olympics in Moscow, the Olympic Panorama magazine intended to publish a photo with a hardly noticeable jamming tower located in the Fili District. Despite the photo being of a public place, it was approved for publication only after the tower was cut from it.

The production of receivers with wavelengths shorter than 25 meters was also controlled. Receivers with those ranges were primarily exported and were sold very rarely within the country.

== Circumvention of censorship ==
Samizdat, allegorical styles, smuggling, and tamizdat (publishing abroad) were used as methods of circumventing censorship. For example, an underground library was functioning in Odessa from 1967 to 1982, which was used by around 2,000 readers. Soviet dissidents were active fighters against censorship. Samizdat was the main method of information dissemination. Such organizations as the Moscow Helsinki Group and the Free Interprofessional Labor Union were also engaged in similar activities, but they were heavily persecuted.

Other forms of illegal distribution included roentgenizdat and magnitizdat, copying and distributing music not available in the Soviet Union.

There were cases of literary hoaxes, where authors made up a translated source. Poet Vladimir Lifschitz, for instance, invented a British poet named James Clifford, who allegedly died in 1944 on the Western Front. Vladimir published poetry which he claimed was written by James Clifford, but which was actually his own work.

One more method was the so-called "dog method". According to this, one should include an obviously ridiculous and attention-drawing vivid episode in the work. As a result, minor nuances went unnoticed. In this manner, a movie named The Diamond Arm was saved after the director, Leonid Gaidai, intentionally included a nuclear explosion at the end of the film. The Goskino commission was horrified and requested that the explosion be removed. After resisting for a while, Gaidai removed the explosion and the rest of the film was left almost untouched.

One of the important information channels were anecdotes. Through this, folklore from people often expressed their critical attitude towards the authorities and communist ideology. Political anecdotes became widespread in the 1960s and 70s.

== See also ==
- Drug policy of the Soviet Union
- Eastern Bloc information dissemination
- First Department
- Human rights in the Soviet Union
- Political repression in the Soviet Union
- Propaganda in the Soviet Union
- Censorship in East Germany
- Censorship in the People's Republic of Poland
- Censorship in the Russian Empire
- Freedom of the press in the Russian Federation
- The Stalin School of Falsification
