= Yuli Vorontsov =

Soviet and Russian diplomat (1929–2007)

- Юлий Воронцов
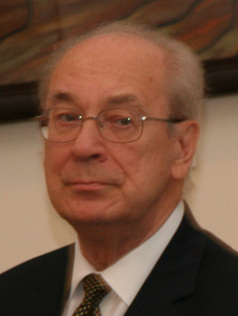
- Vorontsov in 2006

Russian Ambassador to the United States
- In office 23 July 1994 – 16 December 1998
- President: Boris Yeltsin
- Preceded by: Vladimir Lukin
- Succeeded by: Yuri Ushakov

Russian Ambassador to the United Nations
- In office 26 December 1991 – 7 July 1994
- Preceded by: Himself as Soviet Ambassador to the United Nations
- Succeeded by: Sergey Lavrov

Soviet Ambassador to the United Nations
- In office 18 April 1990 – 26 December 1991
- Preceded by: Alexander Belonogov
- Succeeded by: Himself as Russian Ambassador to the United Nations

Soviet Ambassador to Afghanistan
- In office 14 October 1988 – 15 September 1989
- Preceded by: Nikolai Yegorychev
- Succeeded by: Boris Pastukhov

Soviet Ambassador to France
- In office 20 January 1983 – 19 June 1986
- Preceded by: Stepan Chervonenko
- Succeeded by: Yakov Ryabov

Soviet Ambassador to India
- In office 24 December 1977 – 20 January 1983
- Preceded by: Viktor Maltsev
- Succeeded by: Vasily Rykov

Personal details
- Born: 7 October 1929 Leningrad, Russian SFSR, Soviet Union
- Died: 12 December 2007 (aged 78) Moscow, Russian Federation
- Resting place: Novodevichy Cemetery
- Education: MGIMO
- Profession: Diplomat

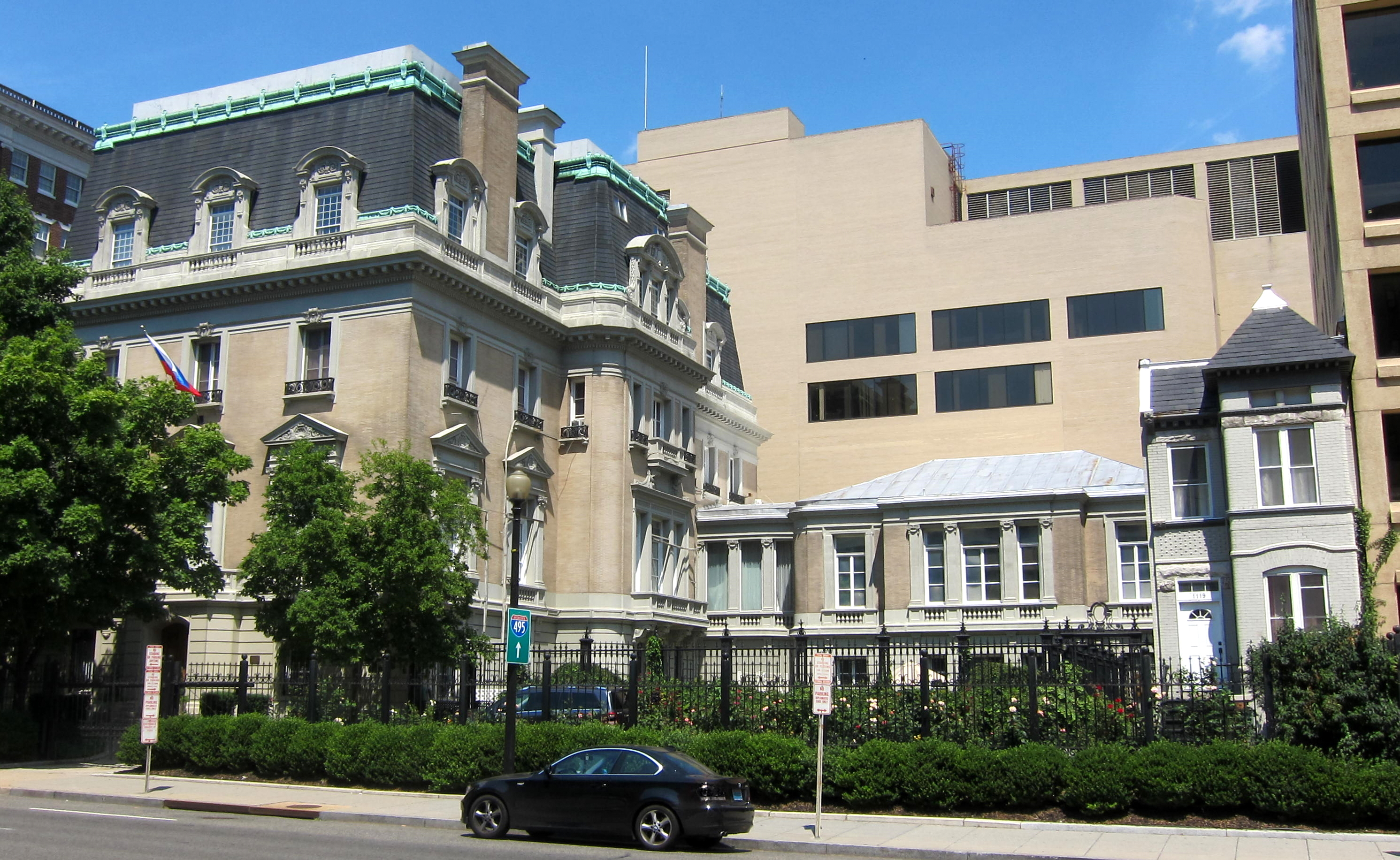
Vorontsov's former residence in Washington, D.C.

Yuli Mikhailovich Vorontsov (also Yuliy Vorontsov; Russian: Юлий Михайлович Воронцов; October 7, 1929 – December 12, 2007) was a Soviet and Russian diplomat, President of International Centre of the Roerichs (Moscow). In the mid-1970s, he was Chargé d'Affaires at the Soviet embassy in Washington under Ambassador Dobrynin. He was then Ambassador to India (1978–1983) and France (1983–1986). He returned to Moscow to be the first deputy foreign minister (1986–1990) and participated in arms reduction talks with the United States. From 1988 to 1989, he was simultaneously the Ambassador to Afghanistan as Soviet troops withdrew from the country. He then served as the last Soviet ambassador to United Nations between 1990 and 1991 and as the first Russian Permanent Representative to the UN from 1991 to 1994. After this, he served as the Russian ambassador to the United States from 1994 to 1998. In 2000, Vorontsov was chosen as the high-level coordinator for issues related to a paragraph of United Nations Security Council Resolution 1284 which once again required Iraq to face "its obligations regarding the repatriation or return of all Kuwaiti and third country nationals or their remains, [and] the return of all Kuwaiti property [...] seized by Iraq" (during the invasion of Kuwait).

== Honours and awards ==
- Order "For Merit to the Fatherland", 3rd class
- Order of Honour
- Order of Lenin
- Order of the October Revolution
- Order of the Red Banner of Labour, twice
- Order of the Badge of Honour
- Honored Worker of the Diplomatic Service of the Russian Federation
- Honorary Worker of the Ministry of Foreign Affairs of the Russian Federation
- Medal of Honour "for participation in United Nations" (United Nations Association of Russia)
- "Blessing" (Patriarch of Moscow and all Rus') for his contribution to the revival of the Orthodox Church and the strengthening of Russian-American relations
- Awards of the International Roerich Centre: Commemorative Medals of Nicholas Roerich, Helena Roerich, George de Roerich, Svetoslav Roerich and a silver medal inscribed "J. Vorontsov 75 years ", presented to Vorontsov in his Jubilee in 2004 in recognition of his enormous contribution to the foundation and development of the Museum of Nicholas Roerich and the International Centre
- Padma Bhushan ("Order of the Lotus") (May 2008, posthumously), for his commitment to strengthening bilateral relations at work not only in India but also in other positions in the Ministry of Foreign Affairs
- Order of the "Pride of Russia" (30 June 2008, posthumously)

Diplomatic posts
Preceded by Vladimir Lukin	Russian Ambassador to the United States; 23 July 1994 – 16 December 1998	Succeeded by Yuri Ushakov
Preceded by (New creation)	Permanent Representative of Russia to the United Nations; 1991 - 1994	Succeeded by Sergei Lavrov
Preceded by Alexander Belonogov	Permanent Representative of the Soviet Union to the United Nations; 1990 - 1991	Succeeded by (Position abolished)
