= Permanent Representative of Russia to the United Nations =

Person who represents the Russian Federation to the United Nations

Permanent Representative of the Russian Federation to the United Nations
- Emblem of the Ministry of Foreign Affairs of Russia

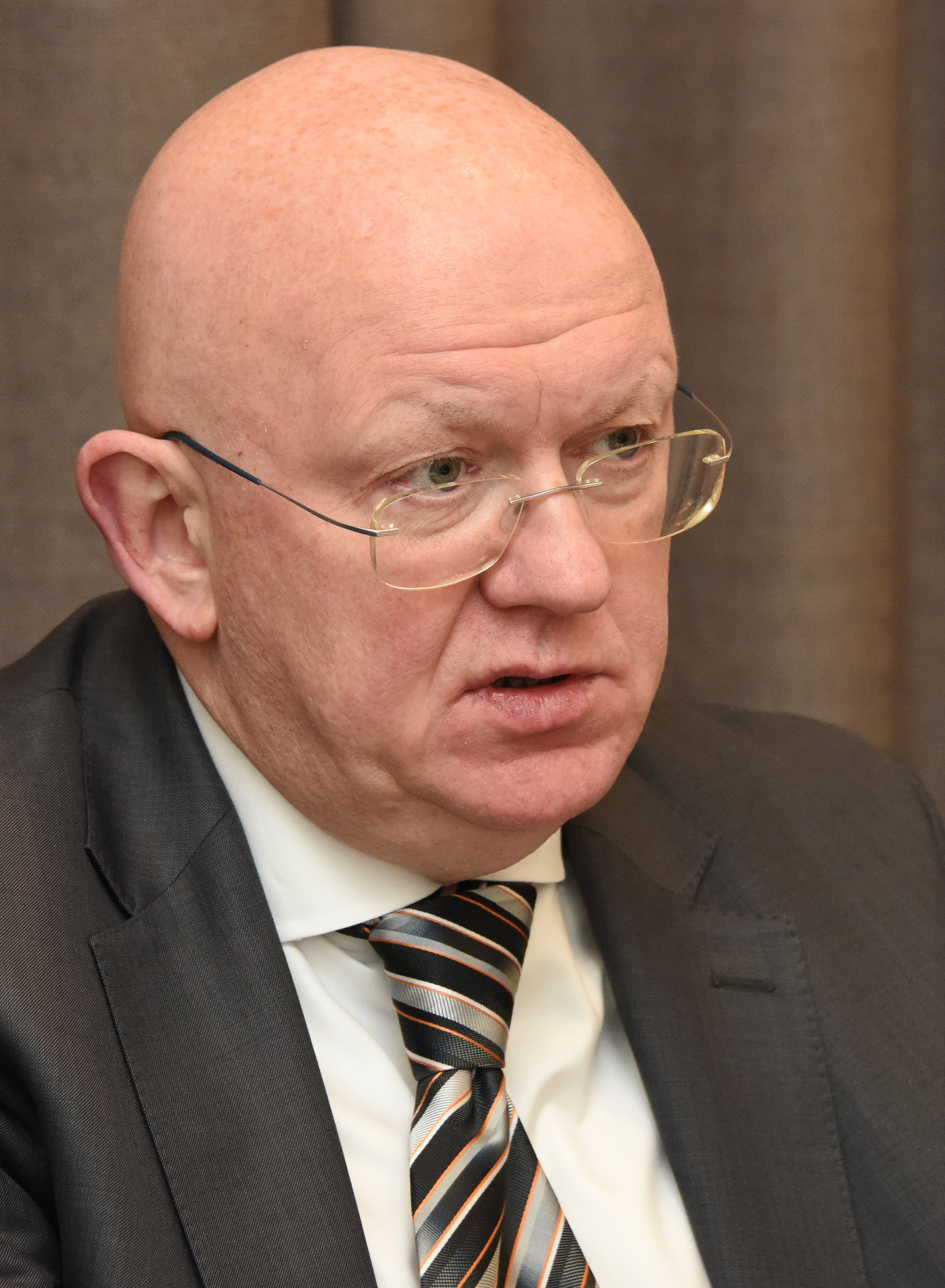
- Incumbent; Vasily Nebenzya since July 27, 2017
- Appointer: President of Russia
- Term length: At the pleasure of the president
- Formation: December 20, 1945 (72 years ago)
- First holder: Andrey Gromyko
- Website: russiaun.ru/ru

The permanent representative of the Russian Federation to the United Nations is the leader of Russia's diplomatic mission to the United Nations. Vasily Nebenzya is charged with representing Russia in the United Nations Security Council and the formal meetings of the United Nations General Assembly except the rare occasion when the most senior officials of Russia are present (such as the president of Russia or the minister of foreign affairs). The ambassador must be nominated by the president and confirmed by the Federation Council.

The position of Russian/Soviet permanent representative to the United Nations is the highest position among all the Russian ambassadors. They serve in various organizations and countries at the pleasure of the president.

Vasily Nebenzya was nominated to the position by President Vladimir Putin and was confirmed by the Federation Council. He has been serving since July 27, 2017.

== List of permanent representatives ==
=== Soviet Union ===
#	Photo	Name	Date appointed	Date presented credentials	Date until	U.N. Secretary-General	Leader
1		Andrey Gromyko	10 April 1946		May 1948	(Norway) Trygve Lie	Joseph Stalin
2		Yakov Malik	May 1948		October 1952	(Norway) Trygve Lie	Joseph Stalin
3		Valerian Zorin	October 1952		March 1953	(Norway) Trygve Lie	Joseph Stalin
3		Valerian Zorin	October 1952		March 1953	(Sweden) Dag Hammarskjöld	Joseph Stalin
4		Andrey Vyshinsky	March 1953		22 November 1954 (Died in office)	(Sweden) Dag Hammarskjöld	Georgy Malenkov
4		Andrey Vyshinsky	March 1953		22 November 1954 (Died in office)	(Sweden) Dag Hammarskjöld	Nikita Khrushchev
5		Arkady Sobolev	1955	12 April 1955	1960	(Sweden) Dag Hammarskjöld	Nikita Khrushchev
6		Valerian Zorin	1960		1963	(Sweden) Dag Hammarskjöld	Nikita Khrushchev
6		Valerian Zorin	1960		1963	(Myanmar) U Thant	Nikita Khrushchev
7		Nikolai Fedorenko	1963	7 January 1963	1968	(Myanmar) U Thant	Nikita Khrushchev
7		Nikolai Fedorenko	1963	7 January 1963	1968	(Myanmar) U Thant	Leonid Brezhnev
8		Yakov Malik	1968		November 1976	(Myanmar) U Thant	Leonid Brezhnev
8		Yakov Malik	1968		November 1976	(Austria) Kurt Waldheim	Leonid Brezhnev
9		Oleg Troyanovsky	November 1976	6 January 1977	March 1986	(Austria) Kurt Waldheim	Leonid Brezhnev
9		Oleg Troyanovsky	November 1976	6 January 1977	March 1986	(Peru) Javier Pérez de Cuéllar	Yury Andropov
9		Oleg Troyanovsky	November 1976	6 January 1977	March 1986	(Peru) Javier Pérez de Cuéllar	Konstantin Chernenko
9		Oleg Troyanovsky	November 1976	6 January 1977	March 1986	(Peru) Javier Pérez de Cuéllar	Mikhail Gorbachev
10		Yuri Dubinin	March 1986	20 March 1986	May 1986	(Peru) Javier Pérez de Cuéllar	Mikhail Gorbachev
11		Alexander Belonogov	1986		1990	(Peru) Javier Pérez de Cuéllar	Mikhail Gorbachev
12		Yuli Vorontsov	1990	22 May 1990	1991	(Peru) Javier Pérez de Cuéllar	Mikhail Gorbachev

=== Russian Federation ===
#	Photo	Name	Date appointed	Date presented credentials	Date until	U.N. Secretary-General	President
12		Yuli Vorontsov	26 December 1991	—	7 July 1994	(Peru) Javier Pérez de Cuéllar	Boris Yeltsin
12		Yuli Vorontsov	26 December 1991	—	7 July 1994	(Egypt) Boutros Boutros-Ghali	Boris Yeltsin
13		Sergey Lavrov	7 July 1994	22 September 1994	12 July 2004	(Egypt) Boutros Boutros-Ghali	Boris Yeltsin
13		Sergey Lavrov	7 July 1994	22 September 1994	12 July 2004	(Ghana) Kofi Annan	Vladimir Putin
14		Andrey Denisov	12 July 2004	3 August 2004	8 April 2006	(Ghana) Kofi Annan	Vladimir Putin
15		Vitaly Churkin	8 April 2006	1 May 2006	20 February 2017 (Died in office)	(Ghana) Kofi Annan	Vladimir Putin
15		Vitaly Churkin	8 April 2006	1 May 2006	20 February 2017 (Died in office)	(South Korea) Ban Ki-moon	Dmitry Medvedev
15		Vitaly Churkin	8 April 2006	1 May 2006	20 February 2017 (Died in office)	(Portugal) António Guterres	Vladimir Putin
—		Pyotr Ilichov (acting)	20 February 2017	—	26 July 2017	(Portugal) António Guterres	Vladimir Putin
16		Vasily Nebenzya	27 July 2017	28 July 2017	Incumbent	(Portugal) António Guterres	Vladimir Putin

== See also ==
- Permanent Mission of Russia to the United Nations
- Russia and the United Nations
- Soviet Union and the United Nations
- Consulate General of Russia, New York City
- Embassy of Russia, Washington, D.C.
- List of diplomatic missions of Russia
- List of ambassadors of Russia to the United States
- Russia–United States relations
- Soviet Union–United States relations
