= Vasily Nebenzya =

Russian diplomat (born 1962)

- Василий Небензя
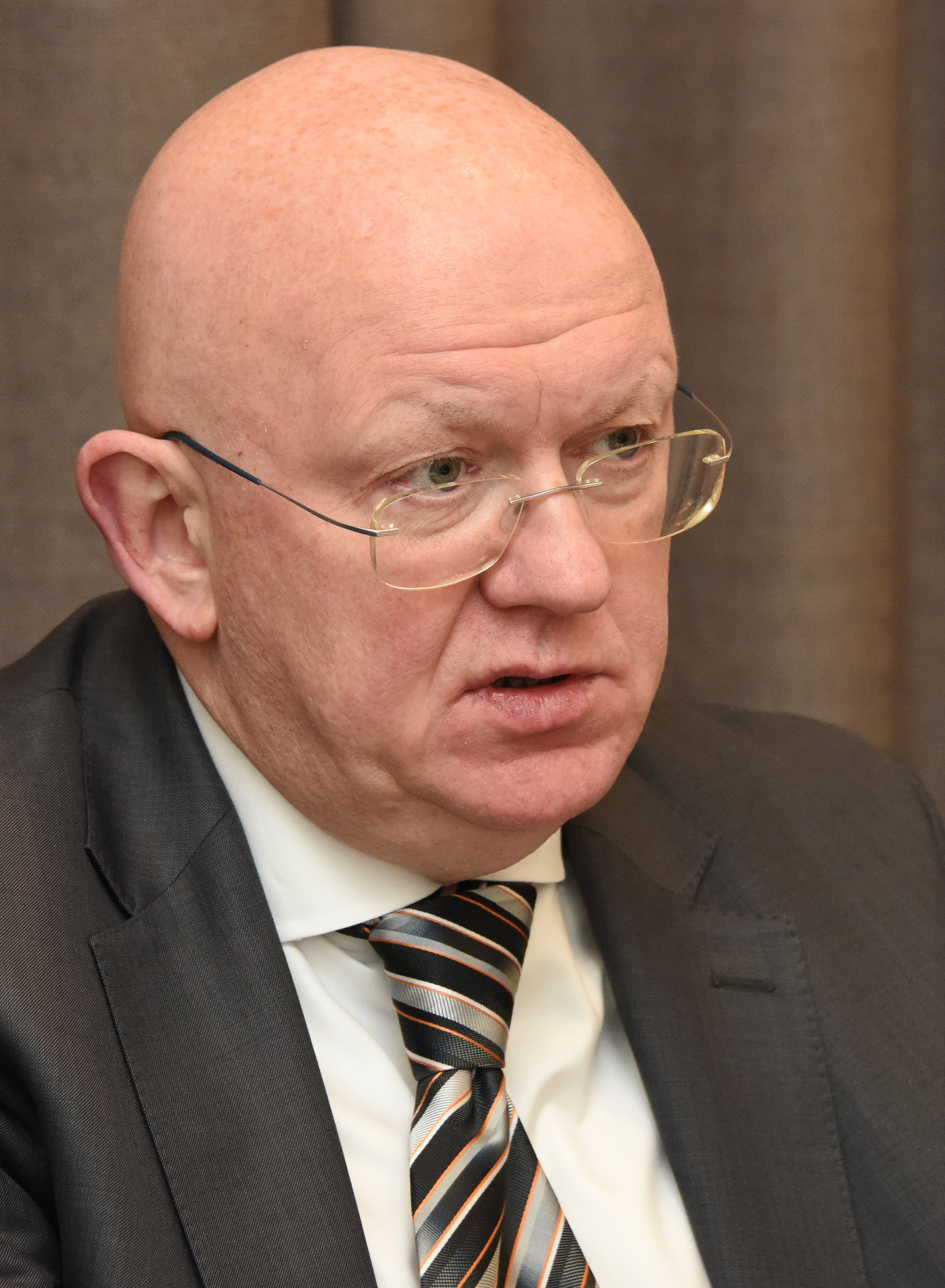
- Nebenzya in 2020

16th Permanent Representative of Russia to the United Nations
- Incumbent
- Assumed office 27 July 2017
- President: Vladimir Putin
- Preceded by: Vitaly Churkin

Deputy Minister of Foreign Affairs of the Russian Federation
- In office 3 June 2013 – 27 July 2017
- President: Vladimir Putin
- Minister: Sergey Lavrov

Personal details
- Born: 26 February 1962 (age 64) Volgograd, Russian SFSR, Soviet Union
- Education: Moscow State Institute of International Relations
- Awards: Order of Friendship

Vasily Alekseyevich Nebenzya (Russian: Василий Алексеевич Небензя; born 26 February 1962) is a Russian diplomat and the current Permanent Representative of Russia to the United Nations. His official title is Ambassador Extraordinary and Plenipotentiary.

== Life and career ==
Nebenzya was born 26 February 1962 in Volgograd to ethnic Ukrainian parents, who trace back their heritage to the Zaporizhzhian Sich. His father was Deputy Chairman of the USSR State Committee for Publishing Aleksei Andreevich Nebenzya (1923–1994). He graduated from the Moscow State Institute of International Relations in 1983. Since then he has pursued a diplomatic career.

- 1988–1990 — attaché of the USSR Embassy in Thailand.
- 1990–1991 — third Secretary Directorate for international economic relations of the Ministry of Foreign Affairs of the USSR.
- 1991–1992 — second Secretary Department of international organizations Ministry of Foreign Affairs of the USSR and Russia.
- 1993-1996 — head of Department, Department of international organizations Ministry of Foreign Affairs of Russia.
- 1996–2000 — Advisor, senior Counsellor, Permanent Mission of Russia to the UN.
- 2000–2006 — head of Department, Deputy Director of the Department of international organizations Ministry of Foreign Affairs of Russia.
- 2006–2011 — Deputy Permanent Representative of Russia to the World Trade Organization.
- 2011–2012 — Deputy Permanent Representative of Russia to the United Nations office and other international organizations in Geneva.
- 2012–2013 — Director of Department for humanitarian cooperation and human rights Ministry of Foreign Affairs of Russia.
- 2013–2017 — Deputy Minister of Foreign Affairs of Russia.
- Since 27 July 2017 — Russia's Permanent Representative to the United Nations.

== Permanent Representative of Russia to the UN ==
=== Nomination and confirmation ===
In February 2017, Russia's Permanent Representative to the UN Vitaly Churkin died. In March 2017, Nebenzya was named as one of the main candidates for the post alongside the Permanent Representative of Russia to NATO Alexander Grushko, and the Deputy Minister of Foreign Affairs Anatoly Antonov.

On 21 April 2017, the Ministry of Foreign Affairs of Russia nominated him for the post of UN Ambassador. The following month he was officially approved by the Federal Assembly of Russia.

President Vladimir Putin appointed Nebenzya as Permanent Representative to the United Nations on 27 July 2017, and he presented his credentials to the UN Secretary-General António Guterres the following day.

=== Invasion of Ukraine in 2022 ===
At the time of the Russian invasion of Ukraine in late February 2022, Nebenzya was serving as the president of the UN Security Council, a position which rotates monthly between the 15 UN member states with seats on the Council. The holder of the presidency is considered to be the "face" and spokesperson of the UNSC. On 23 February 2022 (New York time), President Vladimir Putin announced the invasion via video message while the Security Council was meeting. When the Ukrainian Representative Sergiy Kyslytsya called upon Nebenzya to "call Lavrov right now" and "do everything possible to stop the war", Nebenzya simply stated that "waking up Minister Lavrov at this time is not something I plan to do". He vetoed a proposed resolution by the UNSC condemning the invasion.

UN General Assembly
- Addressing UN General Assembly on 28 February 2022

Speaking at the Eleventh emergency special session of the United Nations General Assembly on the 2022 Russian invasion of Ukraine, Nebenzya maintained that "… there is a need to demilitarize and de-nazify Ukraine" and that "media and social networks" had "distorted and thwarted" the image of Russia's actions. On 30 September 2022, Nebenzya attempted to justify the Russian occupation of southeastern Ukraine, claiming that these Ukrainian regions had chosen to be part of Russia. According to Nebenzya, one of the purposes of the Russian invasion of Ukraine is "undermining the military capability of the Ukrainian army which poses a threat to the security and territorial integrity of Russia".

During a meeting of the Security Council on 24 November 2022, he explained the purpose of Russian strikes against Ukrainian infrastructure, saying: "We're carrying out attacks on infrastructure facilities in Ukraine in response to the country being loaded with Western weapons and unwise calls for Kyiv to wield a military victory over Russia." He claimed that "Ukraine's air defence is to blame for residential houses getting damaged and civilians getting killed in Ukraine."

At a UN Security Council meeting of 14 January 2023, Nebenzya stated that "only when the threat for Russia no longer emanates from the territory of Ukraine and when the discrimination against the Russian-speaking population of this country ends" it could stop its military actions. Nebenzya continued that "Otherwise, Moscow will get what it wants militarily". Nebenzya further claimed that Russia does not want "the destruction of Ukraine as a state, its de-Ukrainianisation and forced Russification".

On 20 September 2023, President of Ukraine Volodymyr Zelenskyy made his first appearance at the UN Security Council. Nebenzya protested Zelenskyy taking the floor, and accused the Prime Minister of Albania Edi Rama, who was serving as the council president, of turning the meeting into "a one-man stand-up show" and it would be "nothing more than a spectacle" to which Rama replied "this is not a special operation by the Albanian presidency" adding "There is a solution for this. If you agree, you stop the war and President Zelenskyy will not take the floor". Nebenzya did not agree.

=== 2023 Israel–Gaza war ===
On 1 November 2023, several weeks into the Gaza war, Nebenzya stated that Israel did not have a right to self-defense in Gaza, since it is considered an "occupying power".

== See also ==
- Permanent Mission of Russia to the United Nations
- Russia and the United Nations
- List of diplomatic missions of Russia
- Russian Ministry of Foreign Affairs

Diplomatic posts
Preceded by Pyotr Ilyichev	Permanent Representative of Russia to the United Nations; 2017–present	Incumbent
