= Eastern Bloc media and propaganda =

State control of mass communications in the USSR and its European satellites

Eastern Bloc media and propaganda was controlled directly by each country's communist party, which controlled the state media, censorship and propaganda organs. State and party ownership of print, television and radio media served as an important manner in which to control information and society in light of Eastern Bloc leaderships viewing even marginal groups of opposition intellectuals as a potential threat to the bases underlying communist power therein.

Circumvention of dissemination controls occurred to some degree through samizdat and limited reception of western radio and television broadcasts. In addition, some regimes heavily restricted the flow of information from their countries to outside of the Eastern Bloc by heavily regulating the travel of foreigners and segregating approved travelers from the domestic population.

== Background ==
=== Creation ===
Map of the Eastern Bloc (until 31 December 1992)

Bolsheviks took power following the Russian Revolution of 1917. During the Russian Civil War that followed, coinciding with the Red Army's entry into Minsk in 1919, Belarus was declared the Socialist Soviet Republic of Byelorussia. After more conflict, the Byelorussian Soviet Socialist Republic was declared in 1920. With the defeat of Ukraine in the Polish–Ukrainian War, after the March 1921 Peace of Riga following the Polish–Soviet War, central and eastern Ukraine were annexed into the Soviet Union as the Ukrainian Soviet Socialist Republic. In 1922, the Russian SFSR, Ukraine SSR, Byelorussian SSR and Transcaucasian SFSR were officially merged as republics creating the Union of Soviet Socialist Republics (Soviet Union).

At the end of World War II, all eastern and central European capitals were controlled by the Soviet Union. During the final stages of the war, the Soviet Union began the creation of the Eastern Bloc by occupying several countries as Soviet Socialist Republics that were originally effectively ceded to it by Nazi Germany in the Molotov–Ribbentrop Pact. These included eastern Poland (incorporated into two different SSRs), Latvia (became Latvia SSR), Estonia (became Estonian SSR), Lithuania (became Lithuania SSR), part of eastern Finland (became Karelo-Finnish SSR) and northeastern Romania (became the Moldavian SSR).

By 1945, these additional annexed countries totaled approximately 180,000 further square miles (465,000 km^{2}), or slightly more than the area of West Germany, East Germany and Austria combined. Other nations were converted into Soviet satellite states, such as the People's Republic of Poland, the People's Republic of Hungary, the Socialist Republic of Czechoslovakia, the People's Republic of Romania, the People's Republic of Albania, and later East Germany from the Soviet zone of German occupation. The Federal People's Republic of Yugoslavia was also wrongfully considered part of the Bloc in spite of the Tito–Stalin Split that occurred in 1948, followed by the formation of the Non-Aligned Movement.

=== Conditions ===
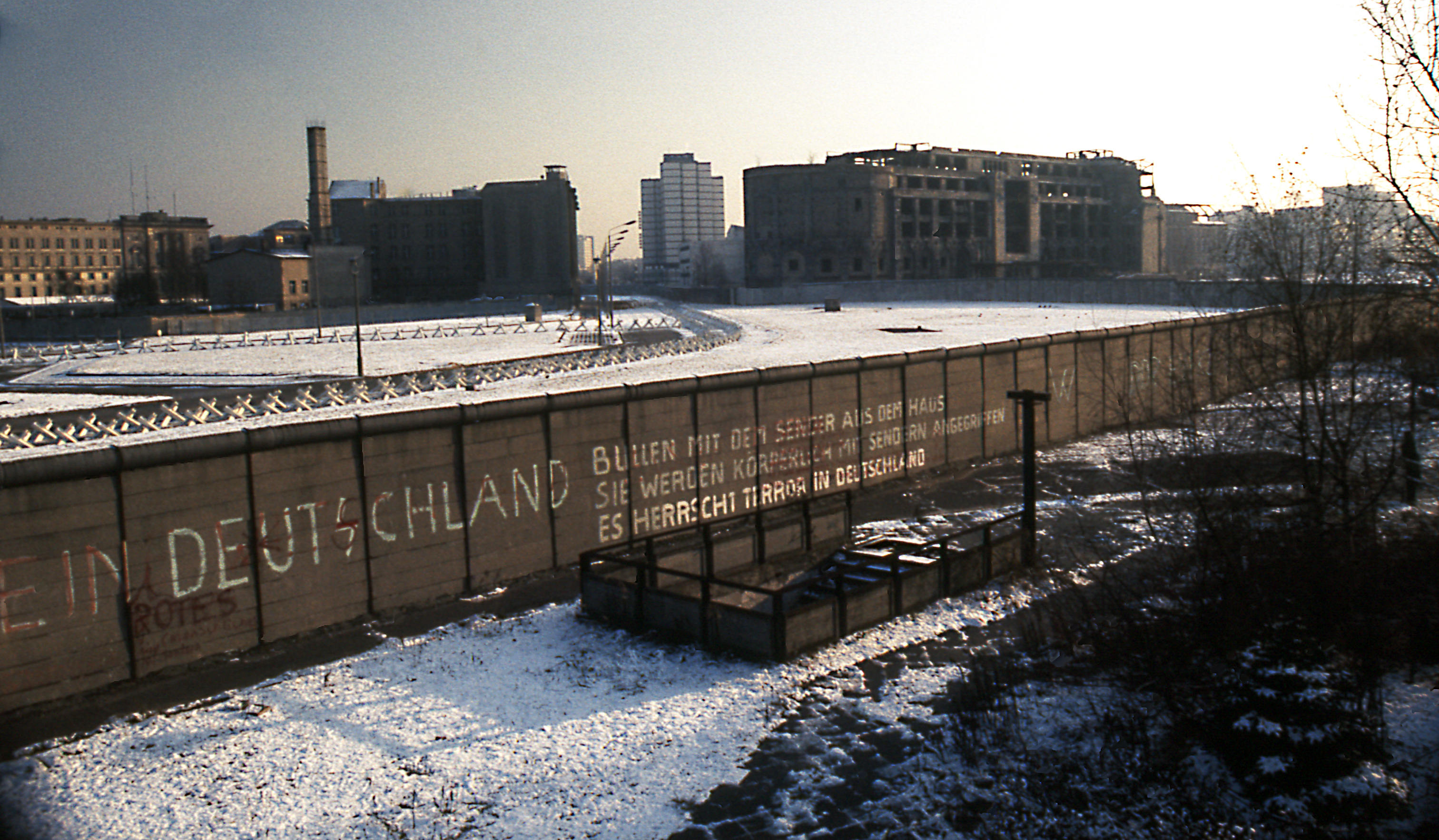
Berlin Wall 1975

Throughout the Eastern Bloc, both in the USSR and elsewhere, Russia was given prominence, and referred to as the naibolee vıdayuşayasya naciya (the most prominent nation) and the rukovodyaşy narod (the leading people). The Soviets encouraged the admiration of everything Russian and the reproduction of their own communist structural hierarchies in each of the Bloc states.

The defining characteristic of communism as implemented in the Eastern Bloc was the unique symbiosis of the state with society and the economy, resulting in politics and economics losing their distinctive features as autonomous and distinguishable spheres. Initially, Stalin directed systems that rejected Western institutional characteristics of market economies, multi-party governance (dubbed "bourgeois democracy" in Soviet parlance) and the rule of law subduing discretional intervention by the state. The Soviets mandated expropriation and etatization of private property.

The Soviet-style "replica regimes" that arose in the Bloc not only reproduced the Soviet command economy, but also adopted the methods employed by Joseph Stalin and Soviet secret police to suppress real and potential opposition. Communist regimes in the Eastern Bloc saw even marginal groups of opposition intellectuals as a potential threat because of the basis underlying communist power. The suppression of dissidence and opposition was a central prerequisite for the security of communist power within the Eastern Bloc, though the degree of opposition and dissident suppression varied by country and period.

While over 15 million Eastern Bloc residents migrated westward from 1945 to 1949, emigration was effectively halted in the early 1950s, with the Soviet approach to controlling national movement emulated by most of the rest of the Eastern Bloc. Furthermore, the Eastern Bloc experienced economic mis-development by central planners resulting in those countries following a path of extensive rather than intensive development and thus lagging far behind their western European counterparts in per capita Gross Domestic Product.

== Media and information restrictions ==
Trybuna Ludu December 13, 1981, reports Martial law in Poland

=== Media and information control ===
In the Eastern Bloc, the state owned and operated the means of mass communication. The ruling authorities viewed media as a propaganda tool, and widely practiced censorship to exercise almost full control over the information dissemination. The press in communist countries was an organ of, and completely reliant on, the state. Until the late 1980s, all Eastern Bloc radio and television organizations were state-owned (and tightly controlled), while print media was usually owned by political organizations, mostly by the local communist party.

Youth newspapers and magazines were owned by youth organizations affiliated with the communist party. The governing body in the Soviet Union was "USSR State Committee for Television and Radio Broadcasting", or USSR Gosteleradio (Государственный комитет по телевидению и радиовещанию СССР, Гостелерадио СССР), which was in charge both of Soviet TV and Radio in the Soviet Union.

The communist party exercised control over the media and was responsible for censorship. Media served as an important form of control over information and thus of society. Eastern Bloc authorities viewed the dissemination and portrayal of knowledge as vital to the survival of communism and thus stifled alternative concepts and critiques. Several state communist party newspapers were published. Radio was initially the dominant medium, with television being considered low on the priority list when compiling five-year plans during the industrialisation of the 1950s.

=== Censorship and squashing of dissent ===
Strict censorship existed in the Eastern Bloc, though it was at times circumvented by those engaging in samizdat. Censorship institutions in the countries of the Bloc were organized differently. For example, censorship in Poland was clearly identified whereas it was loosely structured, but no less efficient, in Hungary. Strict censorship was introduced in the People's Republic of Albania and Federal People's Republic of Yugoslavia as early as 1944, though it was somewhat relaxed in Yugoslavia after the Tito–Stalin split of 1948. Unlike the rest of the Eastern Bloc, relative freedom existed for three years in Czechoslovakia until Soviet-style censorship was fully applied in 1948, along with the Czechoslovak Revolution.

Throughout the Bloc, the various ministries of culture held a tight rein on writers. Cultural products reflected the propaganda needs of the state and Party-approved censors exercised strict control in the early years. During the Stalinist period, even the weather forecasts were changed if they would have otherwise suggested that the sun might not shine on May Day. Under Nicolae Ceauşescu in Romania, weather reports were doctored so that the temperatures were not seen to rise above or fall below the levels which dictated that work must stop.

In each country, leading bodies of the ruling communist party exercised hierarchical control of the censorship system. Each communist party maintained a department of its central committee apparatus to supervise media. Censors employed auxiliary tools such as: the power to launch or close down any newspaper, radio or television station, licensing of journalists through unions and the power of appointment. Party bureaucrats held all leading editorial positions. One or two representatives of censorship agencies modeled on the Soviet GLAVLIT (Main Administration for the Protection of Official and Military Secrets) worked directly in all editorial offices. No story could be printed or broadcast without their explicit approval.

Initially, East Germany presented unique issues because of rules for the occupying powers in the divided Germany (e.g. regarding media control) that prevented the outright seizure of all media outlets. The Soviet occupation administration (SVAG) directed propaganda and censorship policies to East German censorship organs through its "sector for propaganda and censorship". While the initial SVAG policies did not appear to differ greatly from those in the western occupation zones governing denazification, censorship became one of the most overt instruments used to manipulate political, intellectual and cultural developments in East Germany. Art societies and associations that had existed prior to World War II were dissolved and all new theatres and art societies had to register with SVAG. Art exhibits were put under a blanket ban unless censorship organs approved them in advance.

After East Germany's official establishment, while the original constitution provided that "censorship of the media is not to occur", both official and unofficial censorship occurred, although to a lesser extent during its later years. Thereafter, official East German censorship was supervised and carried out by two governmental organizations, the Head office for publishing companies and bookselling trade (Hauptverwaltung Verlage und Buchhandel, HV), and the Bureau for Copyright (Büro für Urheberrechte). The HV determined the degree of censorship and the method of publishing and marketing works. The Bureau for Copyright appraised the work, then decided if it or another publication was permitted to be published in East Germany or in foreign country. For theatres, a "repertory commission" was created that consisted of the Ministerium für Volksbildung (MfV), the ruling SED party, the applicable theatre union and the East German office for theatrical affairs.

After a long visa procurement process, western visitors driving over the West German border to East Germany had their car strip-searched for prohibited Western "propaganda material". Nevertheless, the East German authorities found it extremely difficult to prevent their citizens listening to Western radio stations and Western TV was available across most of the GDR. Technical and diplomatic considerations meant attempts at jamming Western Stations were (unlike in other Eastern bloc countries) soon abandoned.

In the Soviet Union, in accordance with the official ideology and politics of the Communist Party, Goskomizdat censored all printed matter, Goskino supervised all cinema, Gosteleradio controlled radio and television broadcasting and the First Department in many agencies and institutions, such as the State Statistical Committee (Goskomstat), was responsible for assuring that state secrets and other sensitive information only reached authorized hands. The Soviets destroyed pre-revolutionary and foreign material from libraries, leaving only "special collections" (spetskhran), accessible by special permit from the KGB. The Soviet Union also censored images, included removing repressed persons from texts, posters, paintings and photographs.

==== Prominent individuals ====
Throughout the Eastern Bloc, artists or those attempting to disseminate dissenting views were repressed, with a few of the more prominent victims including:

Country	Dissident	Comment
Romania	Gheorghe Ursu	poet who grew disillusioned with Romanian communist doctrine after 1949, and was repeatedly sanctioned for disobedience. In 1985, after being beaten for weeks on end by the Romanian Police, he was transported to the Jilava jail hospital, where he died of peritonitis later in the day.
Romania	Ion Valentin Anestin	His work centered on denouncing Stalin and the Soviet Union, in a series titled Măcelarul din Piaţa Roşie ("The Red Square Butcher") published by the magazine Gluma. Following the start of Soviet occupation of Romania, Anestin was barred from publishing for a five-year period (1944–1949), and ultimately imprisoned. He died soon after his release.
Romania	Vasile Voiculescu	poet who was imprisoned in 1958, at the age of 74, spending four years in prison, where he became ill, and died of cancer a few months after his release.
Romania	Lena Constante	During repeated interrogations by the Securitate, Constante tried to fend off false accusations of "Titoism" and "treason", but, the victim of constant beatings and torture (much of her hair was torn from the roots), and confronted with Zilber's testimony — which implicated her — she eventually gave in and admitted to the charges.
Romania	Anton Durcovici	Catholic clergyman openly critical of the Communist regime, Durcovici was placed under surveillance in 1947, arrested by the Securitate in 1949 during a congregation visit, died from torture and prison deprivation and was buried in an unmarked grave. Communist authorities subsequently attempted to erase all evidence of his stay in prison, and most documents were destroyed.
Romania	–	Other artists, such as Geo Bogza, used subtle imagery or allegories within their works to criticize regimes. This did not prevent state scrutiny, as with the case of Bogza coming under the scrutiny of the Securitate.
USSR	Night of the Murdered Poets	thirteen writers, poets, artists, musicians and actors were secretly executed on orders from Joseph Stalin.
USSR	Nikolai Getman	a Ukrainian artist arrested in 1946 for possessing a caricature of Joseph Stalin his friend had drawn on a cigarette box, Getman was sent to Siberian Gulag camps. He is one of the few artists to record life in the Gulag, where he survived by sketching propaganda for the authorities.
USSR	Vasyl Stus	a Ukrainian author and journalist who wrote a book that was rejected for discrepancies with Soviet ideology, was arrested in 1972, spent five years in prison, arrested again in 1980 for defending members of the Ukrainian Helsinki group, was sentenced to ten years more imprisonment and was subsequently beaten to death in a Soviet forced labor camp.
USSR	Enn Tarto	Estonian dissident who was imprisoned from 1956 to 1960, 1962 to 1967, and again from 1983 to 1988 for anti-Soviet activity.
USSR	Valeriy Marchenko	Ukrainian poet who was arrested in 1973 and charged with Anti-Soviet agitation and propaganda, jailed for six years with two years exile, jailed again in 1983 for violating Article 62 of the Soviet penal code, Anti-Soviet Agitation and Propaganda and sentenced to ten years imprisonment and five years of exile, after which he became ill, was moved to a hospital after international pressure, where he died.
USSR	Jüri Jaakson	Estonian businessman and former politician critical of Soviet rule who was executed by the Soviet Union in 1941.
USSR	Mečislovas Reinys	Lithuanian archbishop critical of Bolshveism who was arrested in 1947 and sentenced to eight years in a Soviet prison, where he died in 1953.
USSR	Metropolitan Ioann (Vasiliy Bodnarchuk)	Ukrainian arrested in 1949 for purported Ukrainian nationalist rhetoric and sentenced to 20 years of hard labor in copper mines.
Hungary	Imre Nagy	former Prime Minister who had supported Hungary's withdrawal from the Warsaw Pact during the Hungarian Revolution of 1956, was later arrested by Soviet authorities after leaving the Yugoslavian embassy, and then secretly tried, found guilty, sentenced to death and was executed by hanging in June 1958. His trial and execution were made public only after the sentence was carried out.
Hungary	József Dudás	political activist who spoke of a 25-point program ending Soviet repression in Hungary to a crowd during the Hungarian Revolution of 1956, and was executed the next year.
East Germany	Arno Esch	political writer who was imprisoned by the Soviet NKVD in 1949, sentenced to death for "counterrevolutionary activities" and executed at the Lubyanka (KGB) prison in 1951.
Bulgaria	Georgi Markov	writer and journalist who defected to the West to work for the BBC and became an outspoken critic of Bulgarian Communism. He was assassinated on Waterloo Bridge in London in 1978.
Poland	Jerzy Popiełuszko	Roman Catholic priest. His sermons, in which he criticized communist system, were routinely broadcast by Radio Free Europe, and thus became famous throughout Poland for their uncompromising stance against the regime. He was brutally murdered in 1984 by agents of Służba Bezpieczeństwa (Security Service of the Ministry of Internal Affairs).

== List of media entities ==
The major newspapers were traditionally the daily official publications of the local communist party. Newspapers served as the main party organs of record and provided official political roadmaps for officials and other readers who needed to be informed. In some countries, the press provided a significant source of income for the ruling communist parties. Radio and television was controlled by the state. The Telegraph Agency of the Soviet Union (TASS) was the central agency for collection and distribution of internal and international news for all Soviet newspapers, radio and television stations. TASS monopolized the supply of political news. It was frequently infiltrated by Soviet intelligence and security agencies, such as the NKVD and GRU. TASS had affiliates in 14 Soviet republics, including the: Lithuanian SSR, Latvian SSR, Estonian SSR, Moldavian SSR, Ukrainian SSR and Byelorussian SSR.

Despite outward similarities in press policy, large differences existed in the roles and functions of the mass media in Eastern Bloc countries. Where the press was allowed more freedom, such as in Poland, Hungary, and Yugoslavia, a national subtext and a significant element of entertainment flourished. In some cases, newspapers and magazines served as the most visible part of liberalizing forces, such as in Poland in 1956 and 1980–81, in Hungary in 1956, and in Czechoslovakia in 1968.

In many instances toward the end of the Eastern Bloc's existence, the ruling communist parties' messages in the press increasingly diverged from reality, which contributed to the declining faith of the public in communist rule. At the same time, some press in the Eastern Bloc became more open in the 1980s in countries such as Poland, Hungary and Czechoslovakia. In Yugoslavia, the press after Tito's reign turned increasingly nationalistic. Only in Romania and Albania did the press remain under tight dictatorial control right up until the end of the Eastern Bloc.

In East Germany, where initial control could be less overt because of shared allied occupation rules, the Soviet SVG set up the Deutsche Verwaltung für Volksbildung (DVV) in the fall of 1945. The SVAG and DVV controlled and approved all publication licenses needed to publish newspapers, books, journals and other materials. Those agencies also provided the top publishing priorities and would apportion paper used for printing to the various publications in accordance with those priorities. The SVAG initially licensed some private publishers which required the employment of a greater number of censors.

=== Notable Communist Party newspapers in the Soviet Union ===
Media	Country	Logo	Notes
Pravda	Russian SFSR / USSR		Official newspaper of the Central Committee of the Communist Party
Trud	Russian SFSR / USSR		Mouthpiece for the Soviet Labor Unions
APN	Russian SFSR / USSR		Press agency under the Soviet Information Bureau
Radianska Ukraina	Ukrainian SSR		Official newspaper of the Communist Party of Ukraine
Zvyazda	Byelorussian SSR		Official newspaper of the Communist Party of Belarus
Sovetskaya Belorussiya	Byelorussian SSR		Official Russian language newspaper of the Communist Party of Belarus
Moldova Socialistă	Moldavian SSR		Official newspaper of the Communist Party of Moldova
Rahva Hääl	Estonian SSR		Official newspaper of the Communist Party of Estonia
Sovetskaya Estonia	Estonian SSR		Official Russian language newspaper of the Communist Party of Estonia
Cīņa	Latvian SSR		Official newspaper of the Communist Party of Latvia
Sovetskaya Latviya	Latvian SSR		Official Russian language newspaper of the Communist Party of Latvia
Tiesa	Lithuanian SSR		Official newspaper of the Communist Party of Lithuania
Kauno Tiesa	Lithuanian SSR		Lithuanian SSR newspaper, printed in Kaunas
Czerwony Sztandar	Lithuanian SSR		Polish language newspaper to Sovietized Territories of Poland annexed by the Soviet Union
Sovetskaya Litva	Lithuanian SSR		Official Russian language newspaper of Communist Party of Lithuania
Totuus	Karelo-Finnish SSR		
Komunisti	Georgian SSR		Official newspaper of the Communist Party of Georgia
Sovetakan Hayastan	Armenian SSR		Official newspaper of the Communist Party of Armenia
Kommunist	Armenian SSR		Official Russian language newspaper of the Communist Party of Armenia
Kommunist	Azerbaijani SSR		Official newspaper of the Azerbaijan Communist Party
Bakinskiy Rabochiy	Azerbaijani SSR		Official Russian language newspaper of the Azerbaijan Communist Party
Sotsialistık Qazaqstan	Kazakh SSR		Official newspaper of the Communist Party of Kazakhstan
Kazakhstanskaya Pravda	Kazakh SSR		Official Russian language newspaper of the Communist Party of Kazakhstan
Kyrgyz Tuusu	Kyrgyz SSR		Official newspaper of the Communist Party of Kirghizia
Sovet Tojikistoni	Tajik SSR		Official newspaper of the Communist Party of Tajikistan
Kommunist Tadzhikistana	Tajik SSR		Official Russian language newspaper of the Communist Party of Tajikistan
Sovet O'zbekistoni	Uzbek SSR		Official newspaper of the Communist Party of Uzbekistan
Pravda Vostoka	Uzbek SSR		Official Russian language newspaper of the Communist Party of Uzbekistan
Sovet Türkmenistany	Turkmen SSR		Official newspaper of the Communist Party of Turkmenistan

=== Other notable newspapers in the Soviet Union ===
Media	Purpose	Country	Logo	Notes
Krasnaya Zvezda	military	Russian SFSR / USSR		Official organ of the Ministry of Defence
Vo Slavu Rodiny	military	Byelorussian SSR		-

=== Notable electronic media in the Soviet Union ===
Media	Type	Country	Logo	Notes
Radio Moscow	Radio	Russian SFSR		Official international radio station of the USSR
Soviet Central Television	TV	Russian SFSR		State-owned television broadcaster in the USSR
Programme One	TV	Russian SFSR	Programme Five	First and main television channel
All Union Programme	TV	Russian SFSR		Second television channel served nationally in the USSR
Moscow Programme	TV	Russian SFSR		Third television channel discussing events in Moscow
Fourth Programme	TV	Russian SFSR		Fourth television channel
Gosteleradio	TV/radio	Russian SFSR		Supervising television & radio broadcasting in the USSR
Telegraph Agency of the Soviet Union	wire service	Soviet Union		Press agency of the USSR
Belarusian Telegraph Agency	wire service	Byelorussian SSR		Affiliated with TASS
ELTA	wire service	Lithuanian SSR		Affiliated with TASS

=== Notable communist party newspapers in the Eastern Bloc ===
Media	Country	Logo	Notes
Laiko Vima	People's Republic of Albania		Official Greek language newspaper of the Party of Labour of Albania
Zëri i Popullit	People's Republic of Albania		Official newspaper of the Party of Labour of Albania
Rudé právo	Czechoslovak Socialist Republic		Official newspaper of the Communist Party of Czechoslovakia
Pravda	Czechoslovak Socialist Republic		Official Slovak language newspaper of the Communist Party of Czechoslovakia
Czechoslovak Press Agency	Czechoslovak Socialist Republic		Press agency controlled by the federal government through its Presidium
Lidová Demokracie	Czechoslovak Socialist Republic		Published by the Czechoslovak People's Party
Práce	Czechoslovak Socialist Republic		Published by the Revolutionary Trade Union Movement
Svobodné Slovo	Czechoslovak Socialist Republic		Official newspaper of the Czechoslovak Socialist Party
Neues Deutschland	East Germany		Official newspaper of the Socialist Unity Party of Germany
Berliner Zeitung	East Germany		East German newspaper printed in East Berlin
Rabotnichesko Delo	People's Republic of Bulgaria		Official newspaper of the Bulgarian Communist Party
Népszabadság	People's Republic of Hungary		Official newspaper of the Hungarian Working People's Party
Esti Budapest	People's Republic of Hungary		Organ of the Hungarian Working People's Party and the Budapest City Council
Trybuna Ludu	People's Republic of Poland		Official newspaper of the Polish United Workers' Party
Scînteia	People's Republic of Romania		Official newspaper of the Communist Party of Romania

=== Notable Electronic Media in the Eastern Bloc ===
Media	Type	Country	Logo	Notes
Berliner Rundfunk	radio	East Germany		State-owned radio station by the GDR, broadcasting events in East Berlin
Deutschlandsender (later Stimme der DDR)	radio	East Germany		Radio station aimed primarily to the West German audience
Radio DDR 1	radio	East Germany		First and official radio station of the GDR
Radio DDR 2	radio	East Germany		Second radio station of the GDR
DT64	radio	East Germany		East German radio station broadcasting only on FM
Radio Berlin International	radio	East Germany		Official international radio station of the GDR (final broadcast bitter about "takeover")
Radio Tirana	radio	People's Republic of Albania		Official radio station in Albania
Radio Sofia	radio	People's Republic of Bulgaria		Official international radio station in Bulgaria
First Programme	radio	People's Republic of Bulgaria		Official radio station in Bulgaria
Kossuth Rádió	radio	People's Republic of Hungary		Official radio station in Hungary
Radio Polonia	radio	People's Republic of Poland		Official international broadcasting station in Poland
Program 1 Polskiego Radia	radio	People's Republic of Poland		Official radio station in Poland
Radio București-România (Radio România Actualități)	radio	People's Republic of Romania		Official radio station in Romania
Radio București Programul 2 (Radio România Cultural)	radio	People's Republic of Romania		Started by the Romanian Radio Broadcasting Company in 1952
Radio București Programul 3 (Radio3Net)	radio	People's Republic of Romania		Started by the Romanian Radio Broadcasting Company in 1963 and rebranded in 1973
ČST1	TV	Czechoslovak Socialist Republic		First and main television station in Czechoslovakia
ČST2	TV	Czechoslovak Socialist Republic		Second television station in Czechoslovakia
DFF	TV	East Germany		First and main television station of the GDR
DFF2	TV	East Germany		Second television station of the GDR
Televizioni Shqiptar	TV	People's Republic of Albania		Main television station in Albania
BNT 1	TV	People's Republic of Bulgaria		First and main television station in Bulgaria
BNT 2	TV	People's Republic of Bulgaria		Second television station in Bulgaria
MTV 1	TV	People's Republic of Hungary		First and official television station in Hungary
MTV 2	TV	People's Republic of Hungary		Second television station in Hungary
TVP1	TV	People's Republic of Poland		First Polish TV channel (since 1952) by Telewizja Polska
TVP2	TV	People's Republic of Poland		Second Polish TV channel (since 1970) by Telewizja Polska
TVR1	TV	People's Republic of Romania		First and official television station in Romania
TVR2	TV	People's Republic of Romania		Second television station in Romania
Radio i Telewizja Polska	TV/radio	People's Republic of Poland		Supervising TV and radio broadcasts in Poland

=== Notable Media for the Youth Organizations and Movements in the Eastern Bloc and the Soviet Union ===
Media	Country	Logo	Notes
Komsomolskaya Pravda	Russian SFSR / USSR		Official organ of the Central Committee of the Komsomol
Pionerskaya Pravda	Russian SFSR / USSR		Official organ of the Vladimir Lenin All-Union Pioneer Organization
Pioner Kanch’	Armenian SSR		Armenian Pioneer daily
Noorte Hääl	Estonian SSR		Estonian Komsomol daily
Sovetskaya Molodëz	Latvian SSR		Latvian Komsomol daily
Komjaunimo Tiesa	Lithuanian SSR		Lithuanian Komsomol daily
Mladá fronta	Czechoslovak Socialist Republic		of the Socialist Union of Youth
Scînteia Tineretului	People's Republic of Romania		Romanian Union of Communist Youth newspaper
Junge Welt	German Democratic Republic		The German Free German Youth newspaper

== Control of information flow out of the Eastern Bloc ==
Beginning in 1935, Joseph Stalin effectively sealed off outside access to the Soviet Socialist Republics (and until his death), effectively permitting no foreign travel inside the Soviet Union such that outsiders did not know of the political processes that had taken place therein. During this period, and even for 25 years after Stalin's death, the few diplomats and foreign correspondents that were permitted inside the Soviet Union were usually restricted to within a few miles of Moscow, their phones were tapped, their residences were restricted to foreigner-only locations and they were constantly followed by Soviet authorities. Dissenters who approached such foreigners were arrested. For many years after World War II, even the best informed foreigners did not know the number of arrested or executed Soviet citizens, or how poorly the Soviet economy had performed.

Similarly, the regimes in Romania carefully controlled foreign visitors in order to restrict the flow of information coming out of (and into) Romania. Accordingly, activities in Romania remained, until the late 1960s, largely unknown to the outside world. As a result, until 1990, very little information regarding labour camps and prisons in Romania appeared in the West. When such information appeared, it was usually in Romanian émigré publications. Romania's Securitate secret police were able to suppress information leaking to the west about resistance to the regime. Stalinist Albania, which had become increasingly paranoid and isolated after de-Stalinization and the death of Mao Zedong, restricted visitors to 6,000 per year, and segregated those few that traveled to Albania.

== Propaganda efforts ==
Communist leaders in the Eastern Bloc openly discussed the existence of propaganda efforts. Communist propaganda goals and techniques were tuned according to the target audience. The most broad classification of targets was:

- Domestic propaganda
- External propaganda
- Propaganda of communist supporters outside the communist states

Communist Party documents reveal a more detailed classification of specific targets (workers, peasants, youth, women, etc.).

Because the communist party was portrayed under Marxist-Leninist theory as the protagonist of history pushing toward the inevitable result of historical materialism as a "vanguard of the working class", Party leaders were claimed to be as infallible and inevitable as the purported historical end itself. Propaganda often worked itself beyond agit prop plays into traditional productions, such as in Hungary after the Tito–Stalin split, where the director of the National Theatre produced a version of Macbeth in which the villainous king was revealed as none other than Yugoslavian leader Josip Broz Tito, who by then was widely hated inside the Eastern Bloc. Regarding economic woes, debilitating wage cuts following economic stagnation were referred to as "blows in the face of imperialism", while forced loans were called "voluntary contributions to the building of socialism".

Communist theoretician Nikolai Bukharin in his The ABC of Communism wrote:

The State propaganda of communism becomes in the long run a means for the eradication of the last traces of bourgeois propaganda dating from the old régime; and it is a powerful instrument for the creation of a new ideology, of new modes of thought, of a new outlook on the world.

Penetration of West German TV reception (red) in East Germany for ARD (regional channels NDR, HR, BR and SFB). Areas with no reception (dark grey) were jokingly referred to as "Valley of the Clueless" (Tal der Ahnungslosen) while ARD was said to stand for "Außer (except) Rügen und Dresden" .

Some propaganda would "retell" the western news, such as the East German television program Der schwarze Kanal ("The Black Channel"), which contained bowdlerized programs from West Germany with added communist commentary. The name "Black channel" was a play on words deriving from the term German plumbers used for a sewer. The program was meant to counter ideas received by some from West German television because the geography of the divided Germany meant that West German television signals (particularly ARD) could be received in most of East Germany, except in parts of Eastern Saxony around Dresden, which consequently earned the latter the nickname "valley of the clueless" (despite the fact that some Western radio was still available there).

Eastern Bloc leaders, including even Joseph Stalin, could become personally involved in dissemination. For example, in January 1948, the U.S. State Department published a collection of documents titled Nazi-Soviet Relations, 1939–1941: Documents from the Archives of The German Foreign Office, which contained documents recovered from the Foreign Office of Nazi Germany revealing Soviet conversations with Germany regarding the Molotov-Ribbentrop Pact, including its secret protocol dividing eastern Europe, the 1939 German-Soviet Commercial Agreement, and discussions of the Soviet Union potentially becoming the fourth Axis Power.

In response, one month later, the Soviet Information Bureau published Falsifiers of History. Stalin personally edited the book, rewriting entire chapters by hand. The book claimed, for instance, that American bankers and industrialists provided capital for the growth of German war industries, while deliberately encouraging Hitler to expand eastward. The book also included the claim that, during the Pact's operation, Stalin rejected Hitler's offer to share in a division of the world, without mentioning the Soviet offers to join the Axis. Historical studies, official accounts, memoirs and textbooks published in the Soviet Union used that depiction of events until the Soviet Union's dissolution.

The book referred to "the American falsifiers and their British and French associates", claimed "[a]s far back as in 1937 it became perfectly clear that a big war was being hatched by Hitler with the direct connivance of Great Britain and France", blasted "the claptrap of the slanderers" and stated "[n]aturally, the falsifiers of history and slanderers are called falsifiers and slanderers precisely because they do not entertain any respect for facts. They prefer to gossip and slander."

In East Germany, the Soviet SVAG and DVV initially controlled all publication priorities. In the initial months of 1946, the Soviets were unsure how to merge propaganda and censorship efforts in East Germany. The SVAG engaged in a broad propaganda campaign that moved beyond customary political propaganda to engage in the practice at unions, women's organizations and youth organizations.

== Bypassing censorship ==
=== Clandestine information passing ===
Samizdat was the clandestine copying and distribution of government-suppressed literature or other media in Eastern bloc countries. Copies were often made in small quantities of handwritten or typed documents, while recipients were expected to make additional copies. Samizdat traders used underground literature for self-analysis and self-expression under the heavy censorship of the Eastern Bloc. The practice was fraught with danger as harsh punishments were meted out to people caught possessing or copying censored materials. Former Soviet dissident Vladimir Bukovsky defined it as follows: "I myself create it, edit it, censor it, publish it, distribute it, and [may] get imprisoned for it." One of the longest-running and well-known samizdat publications was the information bulletin "Хроника текущих событий" (Khronika Tekushchikh Sobitiy; Chronicle of Current Events), which contained anonymously published pieces dedicated to the defense of human rights in the USSR. Several people were arrested in connection with the Chronicle, including Natalya Gorbanevskaya, Yuri Shikhanovich, Pyotr Yakir, Victor Krasin, Sergei Kovalev, Alexander Lavut, Tatyana Velikanova, among others.

Magnitizdat (in Russian магнитиздат) is the process of re-copying and self-distributing live audiotape recordings in the Soviet Union that were not available commercially. The process of magnitizdat was less risky than publishing literature via samizdat, since any person in the USSR was permitted to own a private reel-to-reel tape recorder, while paper duplication equipment was under the control of the state. "Tamizdat" refers to literature published abroad (там, tam, meaning "there"), often from smuggled manuscripts.

=== Western role in propaganda war ===
Western countries invested heavily in powerful transmitters which enabled broadcasters to be heard in the Eastern Bloc, despite attempts by authorities to jam such signals. In 1947, VOA started broadcasting in Russian with the intent to counter Soviet propaganda directed against American leaders and policies, and disseminate pro-Western propaganda directed against Soviet leaders and policies. These included: Radio Free Europe (RFE), the American-backed RIAS in West Berlin, the Voice of America (VOA), Deutsche Welle, Radio France International and the British Broadcasting Corporation (BBC). The Soviet Union responded by attempting aggressive, electronic jamming of VOA, along with some other Western broadcasts, in 1949. The BBC World Service similarly broadcast language-specific programming to countries behind the Iron Curtain.

RFE was developed out of a belief that the Cold War would eventually be fought by political rather than military means. In January 1950, it obtained a transmitter base at Lampertheim, West Germany and on July 4 of the same year, RFE completed its first broadcast aimed at Czechoslovakia Broadcasts were often banned in Eastern Europe and communist authorities used sophisticated jamming techniques in an attempt to prevent citizens from listening to them. In late 1950, RFE began to assemble a full-fledged foreign broadcast staff and became more than just a "mouthpiece for exiles" who had fled Eastern Bloc countries. While RFE was cleared of charges that it gave Hungarian listeners false hope during the Hungarian Revolution of 1956, its Broadcast Analysis Division was established to ensure that broadcasts were accurate and professional while maintaining the journalists' former autonomy.

A 1960 study concluded that RFE possessed considerably more listeners than the BBC or VOA. The study concluded that the BBC was regarded as the most objective and the VOA had suffered a notable decline since it stopped critical broadcasts on the communist world after the Hungarian Revolution of 1956, focusing instead on world news, American culture and jazz.

Vatican Radio played a crucial role for Catholic resistance, as a whole, behind the Iron Curtain, especially for the Catholics of the Byzantine rite, who either were forced to submit to the Eastern Orthodox Church (controlled by the Bolshevik regimes), or adhere to the Latin Catholic community (which itself faced limited rights), until better conditions would emerge (like in the Soviet Union, Yugoslavia or Romania), or were entirely suppressed (like in Albania). This radio station sent messages of hope and of patience, in a climate of continual fear, suffering and surveillance.

== Notes ==
1.The logo used here is the logo of the media in the USSR during the Eastern Bloc era. Most of the media had already dissolved or changed its name and logo.

== Sources ==
- Böcker, Anita (1998), Regulation of Migration: International Experiences, Het Spinhuis, ISBN 90-5589-095-2
- Churchill, Winston (1953), The Second World War, Houghton Mifflin Harcourt
- Cook, Bernard A. (2001), Europe Since 1945: An Encyclopedia, Taylor & Francis, ISBN 0-8153-4057-5
- Crampton, R. J. (1997), Eastern Europe in the Twentieth Century and After, Routledge, ISBN 0-415-16422-2
- Department of State (1948), Nazi-Soviet Relations, 1939–1941: Documents from the Archives of The German Foreign Office, Department of State
- Deletant, Dennis (1995), Ceauşescu and the Securitate: coercion and dissent in Romania, 1965–1989, M.E. Sharpe, ISBN 1-56324-633-3
- Dowty, Alan (1989), Closed Borders: The Contemporary Assault on Freedom of Movement, Yale University Press, ISBN 0-300-04498-4
- Frucht, Richard C. (2003), Encyclopedia of Eastern Europe: From the Congress of Vienna to the Fall of Communism, Taylor & Francis Group, ISBN 0-203-80109-1
- Graubard, Stephen R. (1991), Eastern Europe, Central Europe, Europe, Westview Press, ISBN 0-8133-1189-6
- Grenville, John Ashley Soames (2005), A History of the World from the 20th to the 21st Century, Routledge, ISBN 0-415-28954-8
- Hardt, John Pearce; Kaufman, Richard F. (1995), East-Central European Economies in Transition, M.E. Sharpe, ISBN 1-56324-612-0
- Henig, Ruth Beatrice (2005), The Origins of the Second World War, 1933-41, Routledge, ISBN 0-415-33262-1
- Krasnov, Vladislav (1985), Soviet Defectors: The KGB Wanted List, Hoover Press, ISBN 0-8179-8231-0
- Laqueur, Walter (1994), The dream that failed: reflections on the Soviet Union, Oxford University Press, ISBN 0-19-510282-7
- Lipschitz, Leslie; McDonald, Donogh (1990), German unification: economic issues, International Monetary Fund, ISBN 1-55775-200-1
- Loescher, Gil (2001), The UNHCR and World Politics: A Perilous Path, Oxford University Press, ISBN 0-19-829716-5
- Major, Patrick; Mitter, Rana (2004), "East is East and West is West?", in Major, Patrick (ed.), Across the Blocs: Exploring Comparative Cold War Cultural and Social History, Taylor & Francis, Inc., ISBN 978-0-7146-8464-2
- Miller, Roger Gene (2000), To Save a City: The Berlin Airlift, 1948–1949, Texas A&M University Press, ISBN 0-89096-967-1
- Mynz, Rainer (1995), Where Did They All Come From? Typology and Geography of European Mass Migration In the Twentieth Century; EUROPEAN POPULATION CONFERENCE CONGRES EUROPEEN DE DEMOGRAPHE, United Nations Population Division
- Nekrich, Aleksandr Moiseevich; Ulam, Adam Bruno; Freeze, Gregory L. (1997), Pariahs, Partners, Predators: German–Soviet Relations, 1922–1941, Columbia University Press, ISBN 0-231-10676-9
- O'Neil, Patrick (1997), Post-communism and the Media in Eastern Europe, Routledge, ISBN 0-7146-4765-9
- Olsen, Neil (2000), Albania, Oxfam, ISBN 0-85598-432-5
- Pike, David (1997), "Censorship in Soviet-Occupied Germany", in Gibianskii, Leonid; Naimark, Norman (eds.), The Establishment of Communist Regimes in Eastern Europe, 1944–1949, Westview Press, ISBN 0-8133-3534-5
- Philipsen, Dirk (1993), We were the people: voices from East Germany's revolutionary autumn of 1989, Duke University Press, ISBN 0-8223-1294-8
- Pollack, Detlef; Wielgohs, Jan (2004), Dissent and Opposition in Communist Eastern Europe: Origins of Civil Society and Democratic Transition, Ashgate Publishing, Ltd., ISBN 0-7546-3790-5
- Puddington, Arch (2003), Broadcasting Freedom: The Cold War Triumph of Radio Free Europe and Radio Liberty, University Press of Kentucky, ISBN 0-8131-9045-2
- Roberts, Geoffrey (2006), Stalin's Wars: From World War to Cold War, 1939–1953, Yale University Press, ISBN 0-300-11204-1
- Roberts, Geoffrey (2002), Stalin, the Pact with Nazi Germany, and the Origins of Postwar Soviet Diplomatic Historiography, vol. 4
- Roht-Arriaza, Naomi (1995), Impunity and human rights in international law and practice, Oxford University Press, ISBN 0-19-508136-6
- Shirer, William L. (1990), The Rise and Fall of the Third Reich: A History of Nazi Germany, Simon and Schuster, ISBN 0-671-72868-7
- Soviet Information Bureau (1948), Falsifiers of History (Historical Survey), Moscow: Foreign Languages Publishing House, 272848
- Turnock, David (1997), The East European economy in context: communism and transition, Routledge, ISBN 0-415-08626-4
- Wegner, Bernd (1997), From Peace to War: Germany, Soviet Russia, and the World, 1939–1941, Berghahn Books, ISBN 1-57181-882-0
- Weinberg, Gerhard L. (1995), A World at Arms: A Global History of World War II, Cambridge University Press, ISBN 0-521-55879-4
- Wettig, Gerhard (2008), Stalin and the Cold War in Europe, Rowman & Littlefield, ISBN 978-0-7425-5542-6
