= Boris Pastukhov =

Russian politician and diplomat (1933–2021)

- Борис Пастухов
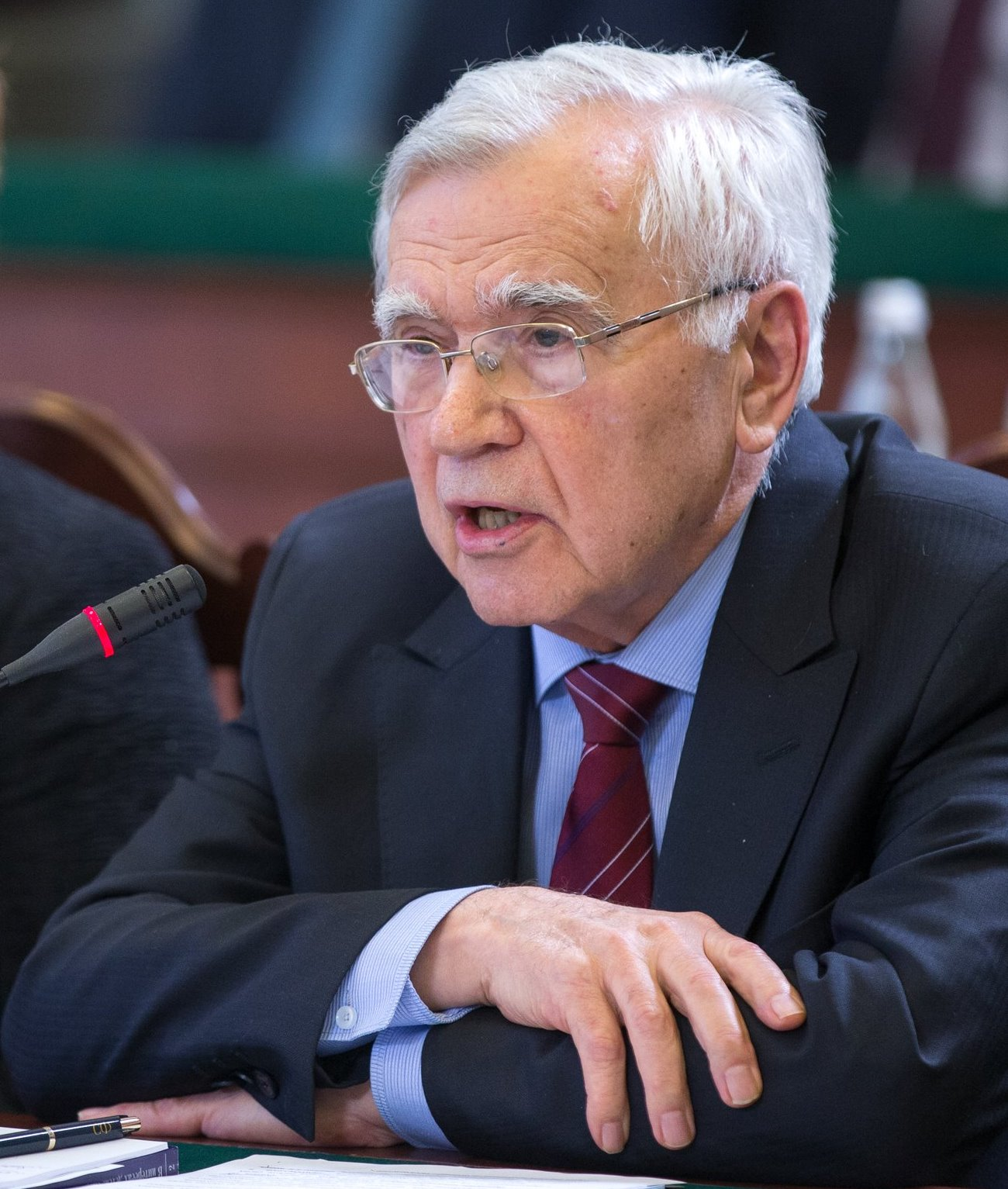
- Pastukhov in 2016

Minister for CIS Affairs
- In office 25 September 1998 – 12 May 1999
- Prime Minister: Yevgeny Primakov
- Preceded by: Anatoly Adamishin
- Succeeded by: Leonid Drachevsky

First Deputy Minister of Foreign Affairs
- In office 3 February 1996 – 25 September 1998
- Preceded by: Anatoly Adamishin
- Succeeded by: Aleksandr Avdeyev

Ambassador of the USSR/Russia to Afghanistan
- In office 15 September 1989 – 22 February 1992
- Preceded by: Yuli Vorontsov
- Succeeded by: Yevgeny Ostrovenko

Soviet Ambassador to Denmark
- In office 12 March 1986 – 15 September 1989
- Preceded by: Lev Mendelevich
- Succeeded by: Gennady Vedernikov

Chairman of the State Committee for Publishing
- In office 6 December 1982 – 24 February 1986
- Preceded by: Boris Stukalin
- Succeeded by: Mikhail Nenashev

First Secretary of the Komsomol
- In office 27 May 1977 – 8 December 1982
- Preceded by: Yevgeny Tyazhelnikov
- Succeeded by: Viktor Mishin

Personal details
- Born: 10 October 1933 Moscow, Soviet Union
- Died: 19 January 2021 (aged 87) Moscow
- Resting place: Troyekurovskoye Cemetery
- Party: United Russia
- Other political affiliations: CPSU; Fatherland – All Russia
- Education: Moscow High Technical College

Boris Nikolaevich Pastukhov (Russian: Борис Николаевич Пастухов; October 10, 1933 – January 19, 2021) was a Soviet and Russian diplomat and politician and a Komsomol member. Following the dissolution of the Soviet Union he was a member of the State Duma of the third (on the electoral list of the Fatherland – All Russia political bloc) and the fourth (on the electoral list of the United Russia party) convocations. He was also a member of the Soviet of the Union of the Supreme Soviet of the USSR (1966–1989) representing the Chelyabinsk Oblast.

== Biography ==
He was born in Moscow where he graduated from School No. 584. In 1958, he graduated from the Bauman Moscow High Technical College . He was a member of the Communist Party of the Soviet Union from 1959 to 1991.

From 1958, he was Second Secretary, and from 1959, First Secretary of the Bauman District Committee of the Komsomol. From 1961, he was Second Secretary, and from 1962, First Secretary of the Moscow City Committee of the Komsomol.

From 1964, he was Secretary of the Central Committee of the Komsomol, and from 1977 to 1982, he was First Secretary of the Central Committee of the Komsomol. From 1982 to 1986, he was Chairman of the State Committee for Publishing Printing, and Book Trade.

He was a candidate (alternate) member of the Central Committee of the Communist Party of the Soviet Union (1966-1978) and then a full (voting) Member of the Central Committee from 197 to 1986.

From March 12, 1986 to September 15, 1989, he served as Ambassador Extraordinary and Plenipotentiary of the Soviet Union to Denmark.

From September 15, 1989 to February 22, 1992, he served as Ambassador Extraordinary and Plenipotentiary of the USSR/Russia to Afghanistan.

From 1992, he served as Deputy Minister of Foreign Affairs of the Russian Federation, and from 1996, as First Deputy Minister of Foreign Affairs.

From 1998 to 1999, he served as Minister for CIS Affairs in Yevgeny Primakov's Cabinet.

In 2009, he served as Senior Vice President of the Chamber of Commerce and Industry of the Russian Federation. In 2011, he served as Advisor to the Director General of the International Trade Center of the Chamber of Commerce and Industry of Russia.

He is buried at the Troekurovskoye Cemetery in Moscow (section 8).

== Awards ==
- Order "For Merit to the Fatherland", 2nd class (October 17, 2008) — for significant contribution to the development of entrepreneurship in the Russian Federation and long-term conscientious work
- Order "For Merit to the Fatherland," 3rd class (October 10, 2003) — for active legislative activity and long-term conscientious work
- Order of Alexander Nevsky (October 11, 2018) — for significant contribution to the patriotic education of youth and active public work
- Order of Friendship (June 21, 1996) — for services to the state, significant contribution to the implementation of foreign policy and ensuring Russia's national interests, courage and dedication shown in the performance of official duty
- Order of Lenin (1981)
- Order of the Red Banner of Labour (1963, 1971, 1976)
- Order of the Red Star (November 5, 1990) — for exemplary performance of official duty and courage demonstrated in the context of the aggravation of the military-political situation in Afghanistan
- Order of Merit, 3rd Class (Ukraine, October 10, 2003) — for strengthening Ukrainian-Russian bilateral relations.
- Order of Honor (Belarus, October 8, 2003) — for significant personal contribution to the development of comprehensive cooperation between the Republic of Belarus and the Russian Federation, strengthening Belarusian-Russian friendship.
- Dank Medal (Kyrgyzstan, January 22, 1997) — for contribution to the development and strengthening of cooperation between the Kyrgyz Republic and the Russian Federation and in connection with the 5th anniversary of the formation of the Commonwealth of Independent States.
- Gratitude from the President of the Russian Federation (May 5, 2003) — for active participation in organizing and holding events for the Year of Ukraine in the Russian Federation
- Gratitude from the President of Russia (January 20, 2004) — for active and fruitful work on preparing the draft Treaty between Russia and Georgia on Friendship, Good-Neighborliness, Cooperation, and Mutual Security.
- Charter of the Commonwealth of Independent States (June 1, 2001) — for active work to strengthen and develop the Commonwealth of Independent States.
- Honorary Badge of the Komsomol
