= Pyotr Ilyichev =

Russian diplomat (born 1966)

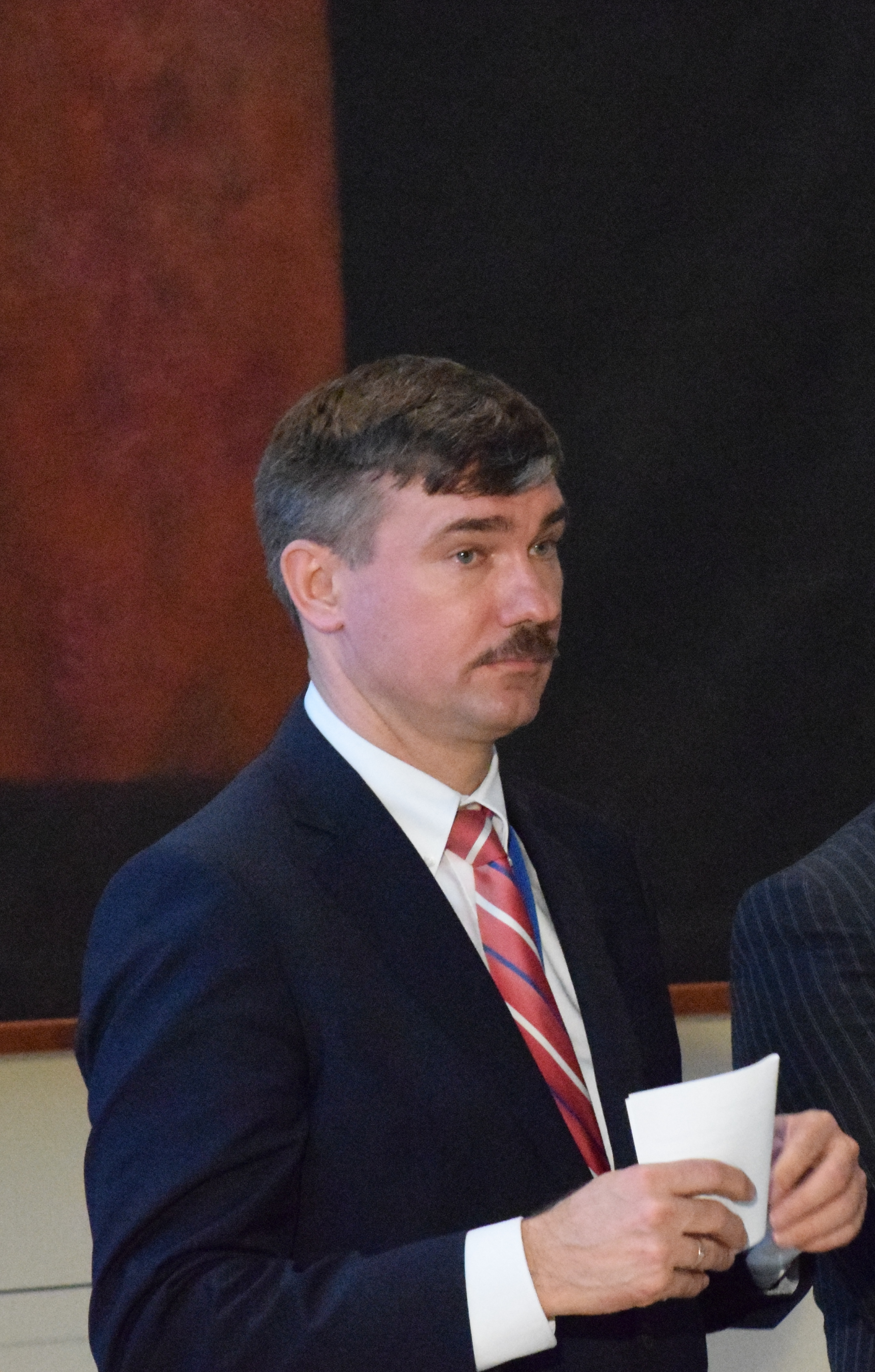
Ilyichev in 2017

Pyotr Viktorovich Ilyichev (Russian: Пётр Викторович Ильичёв; born 11 March 1966) is a Russian diplomat, first deputy of Permanent Representative of Russia to the United Nations.

From 20 February to 27 July 2017, Ilichov was the acting Representative of Russia to the United Nations.

Diplomatic posts
Preceded by Vitaly Churkin	Permanent Representative of Russia to the United Nations; 2017 (Acting)	Succeeded by Vasily Nebenzya
