= Institute of Scientific Information on Social Sciences of the Russian Academy of Sciences =

Soviet-Russian research center

Coordinates: 55.6762°N 37.5639°E

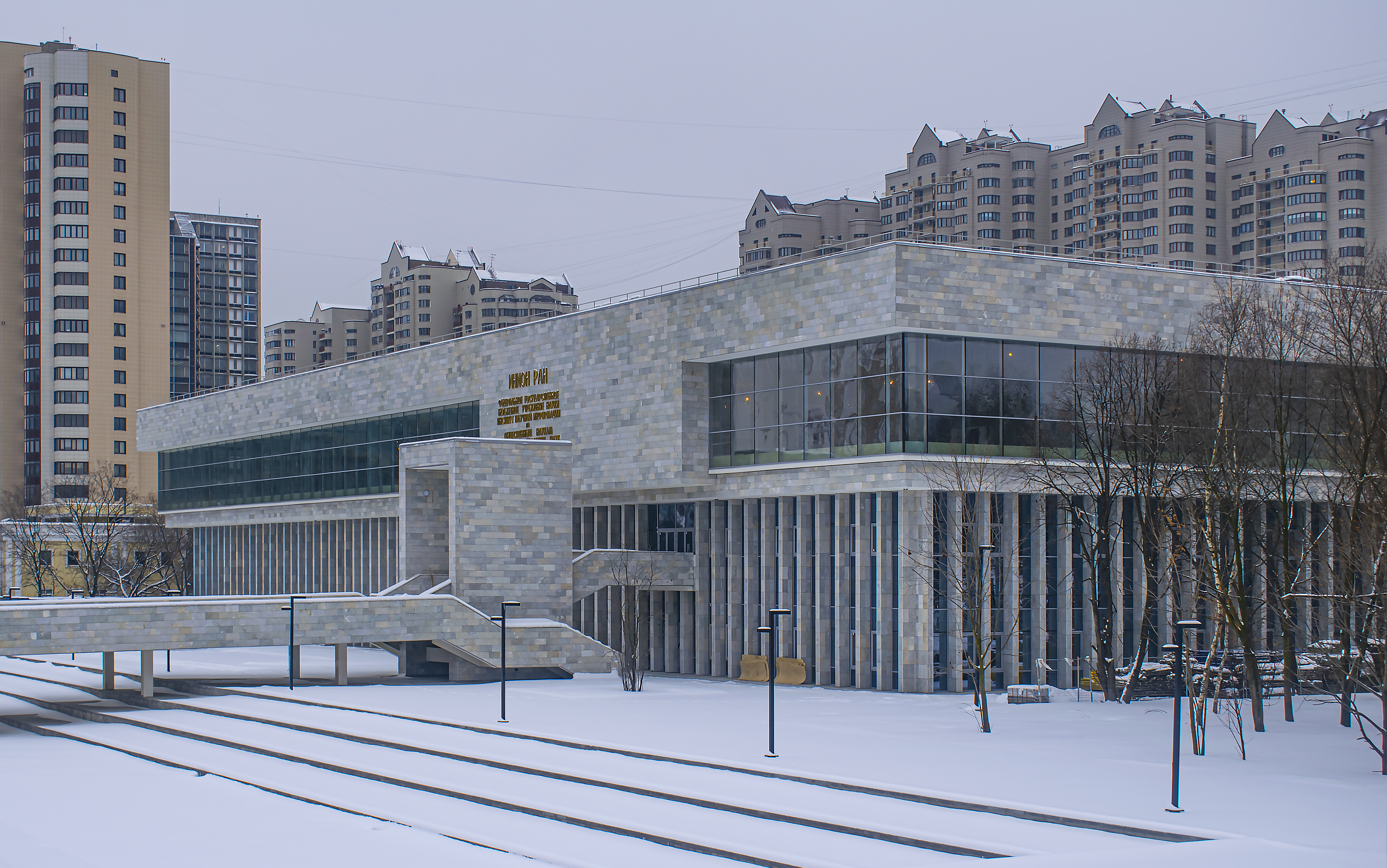
- Location: Moscow, Russia
- Website: www.inion.ru
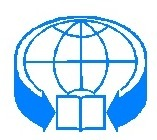

Institute of Scientific Information for Social Sciences of the Russian Academy of Sciences, INION RAN (Russian: Институт научной информации по общественным наукам РАН, ИНИОН) is a major center for research in social studies and humanities. The research center was created in 1969 as a successor to the Russian Academy's Fundamental Library of Social Sciences, which was established in 1918. (Note: В 1918—1924 — Библиотека Социалистической академии ВЦИК; 1924—1936 — Библиотека Коммунистической академии ЦИК СССР; 1936—1968 — Фундаментальная библиотека по общественным наукам Академии наук СССР; 1969—1991 — Институт научной информации по общественным наукам Академии наук СССР; с 1991 — Институт научной информации по общественным наукам Российской Академии наук.)

== History ==
The information center is known in the Russian and international scientific community for its abstract periodicals, bibliographies, and analytical reports, and for its Fundamental research library holding over 14 million items.

The INION maintains and expands its contacts with foreign scientific research and library centers in various countries, including Germany, France, U.S.A., India, and Chinese People's Republic. Cooperation is maintained on a bilateral basis, as well as within the framework of international projects. The INION's main structural units are centers that are involved in the scientific information, research, bibliography, library activities aimed at developing the social sciences and humanities.

=== Structure ===
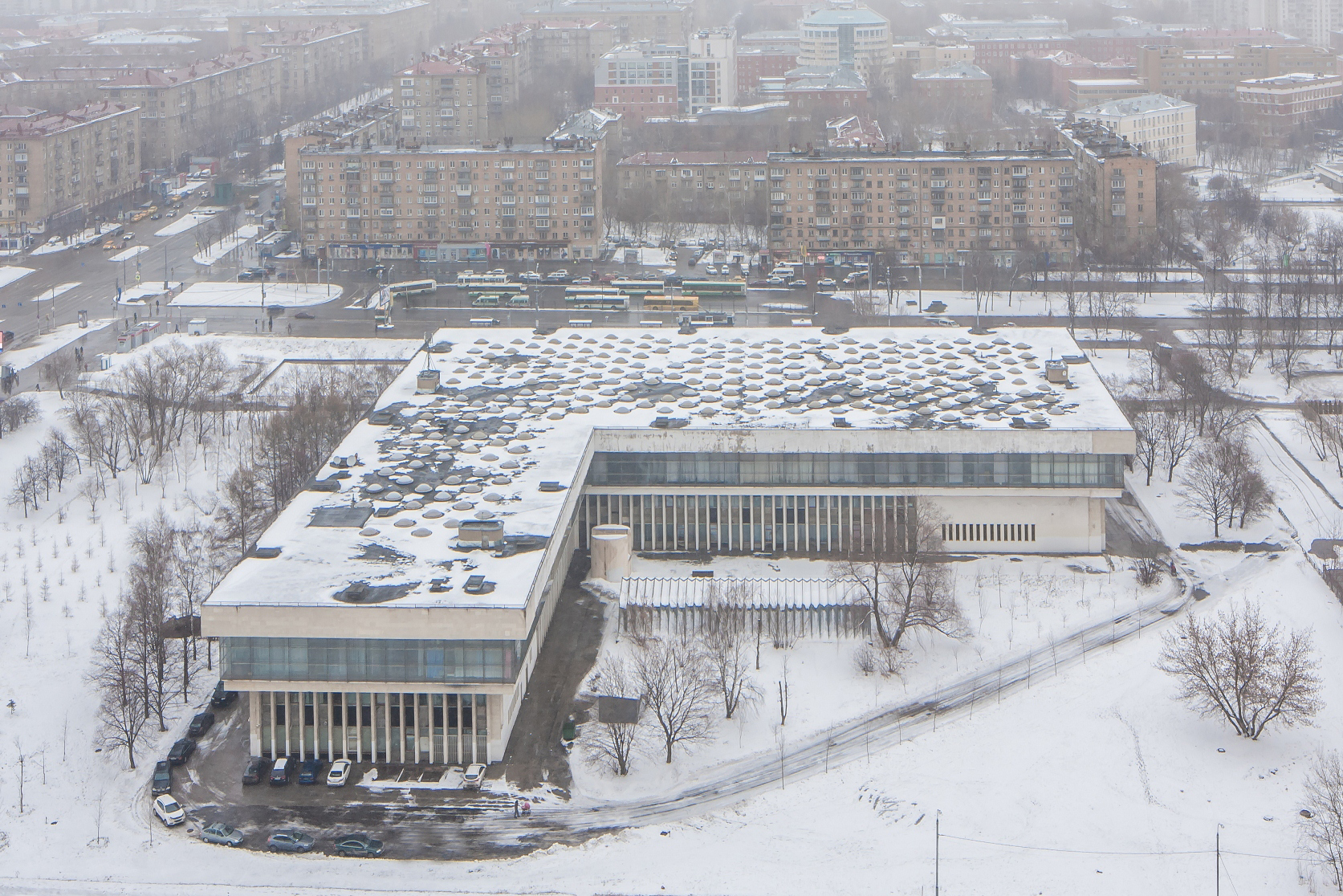
The building

- The Center of Scientific Information Studies in the Social Sciences
- The Center of Scientific Information Studies in the Humanities
- The Center of Scientific Information Studies on Global and Regional Issues
- The Center of Scientific Information Studies in Science, Education and Technologies
- The Main Library
- The Information Science Center
- The Center of Information Support of Banking and Free Enterprise Activities
- The Center of Comprehensive Research of the Russian Emigration
- The Department of Bibliography of Scientists
- The Center for Advanced Studies in the Social Sciences and Humanities
- The Department for Scientific Cooperation and International Contacts
- The Center of Russian Studies
- The Department of Post-Graduate Studies
- The Publishing Center

== 2015 fire ==
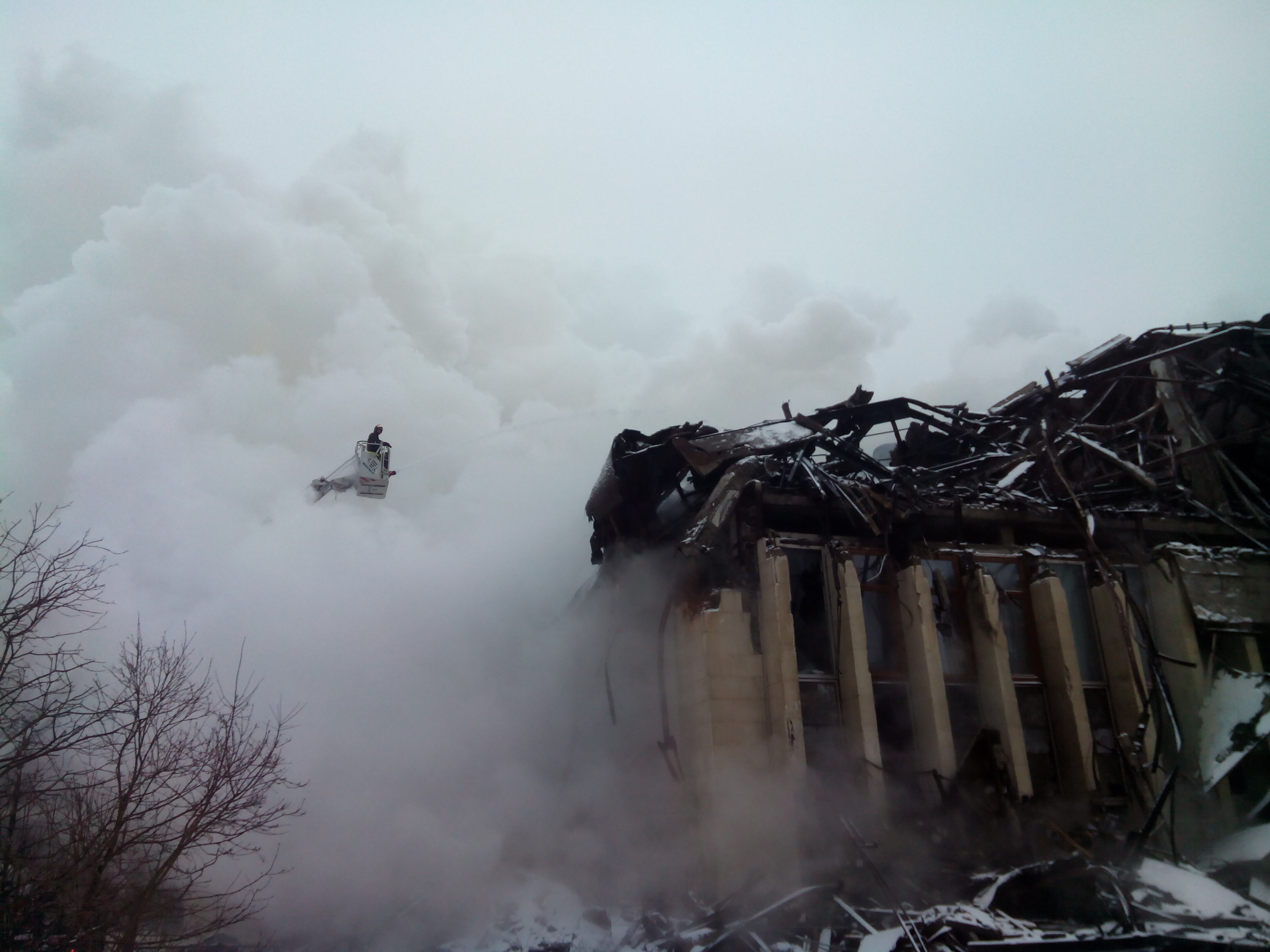
The fire

The library was partially destroyed by fire on January 30, 2015. In the fire, 5.42 million items were lost, 2.32 million of which were unique copies (or at least not present elsewhere in Russia).

== Current situation ==
Currently, INION RAN is a major research center, which also provides library, information and analytical support for scientific activities within Social Sciences and Humanities. Since the summer of 2019 its main building is under reconstruction. The INION RAN stuff consists of more than five hundred people. The average number of full-time scientists of INION RAN is more than 150 people. Users have access to about 3.7 million units in the halls of 18 library departments and bibliographic services at scientific institutes around Moscow. Since May 9, 2019, the acting director of the institute is a Corresponding Member of the Russian Academy of Sciences, Doctor of Science in Economics Alexey V. Kuznetsov.

== See also ==
- List of libraries in Russia
