= The Stalin School of Falsification =

1937 book by Leon Trotsky

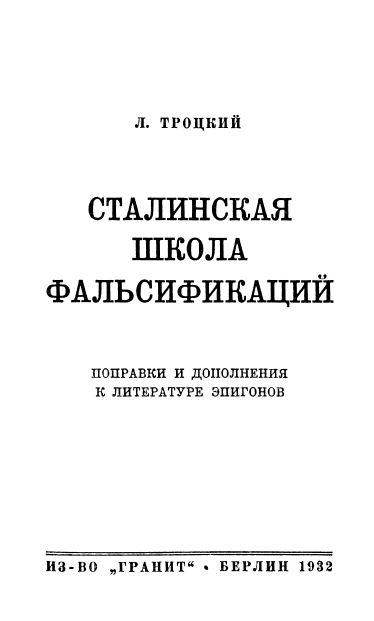
- 1932 title page
- Author: Leon Trotsky
- Language: Russian
- Publication date: 1932
- OCLC: 749088834

The Stalin School of Falsification (Russian: Сталинская школа фальсификаций, romanized: Stalinskaya shkola falsifikatsy) is a 1932 book by Russian revolutionary Leon Trotsky. Written after Trotsky's expulsion from the Soviet Union, the book contains a detailed account of how historians chosen by Joseph Stalin rewrote revolutionary history. A well-known example from the book concerns the revolutionary contributions by Trotsky himself about which Stalin had written glowingly in 1918, but whose special value he denied by 1924.

== Publication history ==
The book was initially published in Russian at Berlin in 1932. A translation in English by Max Shachtman was published in 1937 by Pioneer Publishers. In 1974, New Park in London published another edition.
