= State Committee for Publishing =

Agency in charge of literature releases and trade in the Soviet Union

Goskomizdat (Russian: Госкомиздат, an abbreviation for Государственный комитет по делам издательств, полиграфии и книжной торговли СССР, Gosudarstvenny komitet po delam izdatelstv, poligrafii i knizhnoy torgovli SSSR, "State Committee for Publishing, Printing, and Book Trade of the USSR") was the State Committee for Publishing in the Soviet Union.

It had control over publishing houses, printing plants, the book trade, and was in charge of the ideological and political censorship of literature.

== Goskomizdat chairmen ==
- 1949–1953 – Leonid Pavlovich Grachev
- 1963–1965 – Pavel Konstantinovich Romanov
- 1965–1970 – Nikolai Alexandrovich Mikhailov
- 1970–1982 – Boris Ivanovich Stukalin
- 1982–1986 – Boris Nikolaevich Pastukhov
- 1986–1989 – Mikhail Fedorovich Nenashev
- 1989–1990 – Nikolay Ivanovich Efimov
- 1990–1991 – Mikhail Fedorovich Nenashev

== See also ==
- Samizdat
- Glavlit
- Eastern Bloc information dissemination
- Eastern Bloc media and propaganda
- Propaganda in the Soviet Union
- Censorship in the Soviet Union
