= First Department =

Agency in charge of scientific, technical and publishing workplace secrecy in the USSR

Soviet poster: "Be vigilant. Even walls are listening nowadays. Chat and gossip are not far from high treason. DO NOT CHAT!"

The First Department (Russian: первый отдел) was in charge of secrecy and political security of the workplace of every enterprise or institution of the Soviet Union that dealt with any kind of technical or scientific information (plants, R&D institutions, etc.) or had printing capabilities (e.g., publishing houses).

Every branch of the Central Statistical Administration and its successor the State Statistics Committee (Goskomstat) also had a First Department to control access, distribution, and publication of official economic, population, and social statistics. Copies of especially sensitive documents were numbered and labeled or stamped as secret or "For official use only". In some cases, the "official use" version of documents mimicked the public use versions in format but provided much more detailed information.

The first departments were a part of the KGB and not subordinated to the management of the enterprise or institution. Among its functions was control of access to information considered state secret, of foreign travel, and of publications. The First Department also kept account of the usage of copying devices (xerographers, printing presses, typewriters, etc.) to prevent unsanctioned copying, including samizdat.

== See also ==
- Censorship in the Soviet Union
- Spetskhran
