= Spetskhran =

Restricted library and archival materials in the USSR

Spetskhran (Russian: Спецхран an abbreviation for "Special Storage Section", отдел специального хранения) were limited access collections and archival reserves in libraries and archives of the Soviet Union, as part of the system of censorship in the Soviet Union.

Access to materials from Special Storage was conditional on special permission: a person had to either have the corresponding level of security access or to have written permission from the First Department from the person's job.

Special Storage was for two major types of publications: those deemed "ideologically dangerous" and classified information whose disclosure could threaten the economy and defense of the state. Examples:

- Early Soviet publications associated with the "banned" names (Leon Trotsky, Nikolai Bukharin, etc.)
- Early Russian non-communist publications
- Russian émigré publications
- Foreign language publications deemed threatening to the Soviet State.
- Foreign scientific and technical publications were normally available to general readership, with "threatening" pages cut out, and full versions available from spetskhran.
- Various classified publications, such as Soviet classified dissertations ("Диссертация для служебного пользования"), classified technical references, etc.

== See also ==
- Index Librorum Prohibitorum
