= Alexander Belonogov =

Soviet and Russian diplomat

- Александр Белоногов
- Born: 15 May 1931 (age 95)
- Occupation: Diplomat
- Political party: Communist Party of the Soviet Union (1954–1991)

Alexander Mikhailovich Belonogov (born 15 May 1931) is a retired Soviet and Russian diplomat.

In 1954–1962 served at the Treaty Section of the Soviet Ministry of Foreign Affairs. In 1962–1967 served as Secretary of the Soviet Embassy in London. In 1967–1978 served at the Foreign Policy Planning Office of the Soviet Ministry of Foreign Affairs. In 1978–1979 served as head of the African and Middle Eastern Section of the USSR Ministry of Foreign Affairs. In 1979–1984 served on the staff of the US Section of the Soviet Ministry of Foreign Affairs.

After 1984 served mostly abroad. In 1984, diplomatic relations were reestablished between the Soviet and the Egyptian government (severed in 1981), and Belonogov was appointed Ambassador to Egypt, a post he held until 1986. In 1986–1990 served as Permanent Representative of the USSR to the UN. In 1990–1992 served as Vice Minister of Foreign Affairs at a time the Soviet Union was officially dissolved. During the 1991 Soviet coup d'état attempt he sided with the State Committee on the State of Emergency, and traveled to Beijing to request diplomatic support for the coup from China. In 1992–1998 served as Russian Ambassador to Canada. In 1998 retired from active service. In 2008, he published his memoirs from the time he served Ambassador to Egypt.
