= Igor Lyakin-Frolov =

Russian diplomat

- Игорь Лякин-Фролов
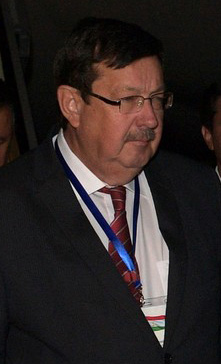
- Lyakin-Frolov in 2018

Ambassador of Russia to Tajikistan
- In office 1 August 2013 – 16 August 2022
- President: Vladimir Putin
- Preceded by: Yuri Popov
- Succeeded by: Semyon Grigoriev

Permanent Plenipotentiary of Russian to the Collective Security Treaty Organization
- In office 23 August 2010 – 11 July 2013
- President: Dmitry Medvedev; Vladimir Putin
- Preceded by: Aleksandr Rannikh
- Succeeded by: Viktor Vasilyev

Ambassador of Russia to Botswana
- In office 29 September 2003 – 29 February 2008
- President: Vladimir Putin
- Preceded by: Valery Kalugin
- Succeeded by: Anatoly Korsun

Ambassador of Russia to Burundi
- In office 22 May 1995 – 24 August 1999
- President: Boris Yeltsin
- Preceded by: Artur Vesyolov
- Succeeded by: Gennady Gumenyuk

Personal details
- Born: 10 September 1948 (age 78) Moscow
- Education: Moscow State Institute of International Relations
- Awards: Order of Alexander Nevsky; Order of Honour; Order of Friendship

Igor Semenovich Lyakin-Frolov (Russian: Игорь Семёнович Лякин-Фролов; born 10 September 1948) is a Russian diplomat.

== Biography ==
Lyakin-Frolov worked in the Soviet foreign ministry from 1978 until 1991, then in the Russian foreign ministry from 1992 to 1995. Since then, he has held the positions of Ambassador of Russia to Burundi from 1995 to 1999, ambassador to Botswana from 2003 to 2005, the Permanent Plenipotentiary to the Collective Security Treaty Organization from 2010 to 2013, and the ambassador to Tajikistan from 2013 to 2022.

Speaks English, French and Chinese languages.

== Awards ==
- Decoration For Impeccable Service (2004)
- Order of Honour (2012)
- Order of Friendship (2017)
- Order of Alexander Nevsky (2022)
