= Valery Loshchinin =

Soviet and Russian diplomat (1940–2023)

- Валерий Лощинин
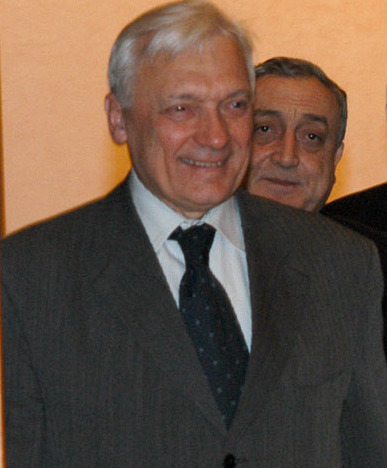
- Loshchinin in 2005

Permanent Representative of Russia to the UN Office and other International Organizations in Geneva
- In office 26 December 2005 – 5 December 2011
- Preceded by: Leonid Skotnikov
- Succeeded by: Aleksey Borodavkin

Permanent Representative of Russia to the Conference on Disarmament
- In office 26 December 2005 – 5 December 2011
- Preceded by: Leonid Skotnikov
- Succeeded by: Aleksey Borodavkin

Permanent Representative of Russia to International Organizations in Vienna
- In office 18 March 1999 – 7 April 2001
- Preceded by: Oleg Sokolev
- Succeeded by: Grigory Berdennikov

Ambassador of Russia to Belarus
- In office 25 November 1996 – 24 February 1999
- Preceded by: Igor Saprykin
- Succeeded by: Vyacheslav Dolgov

Personal details
- Born: 11 September 1940 Moscow, Russian SFSR, Soviet Union
- Died: 14 March 2023 (aged 82)
- Education: Belarusian State University; Diplomatic Academy of the Ministry of Foreign Affairs
- Awards: Honored Employee of the Diplomatic Service of the Russian Federation; Order "For Merit to the Fatherland" Third and Fourth Class; Order of Alexander Nevsky; Order of Friendship; Order of the Friendship of Peoples (Belarus); Order of Honor (Belarus)

Valery Vasilyevich Loshchinin (Russian: Валерий Васильевич Лощинин; 11 September 1940 – 14 March 2023) was a Soviet and Russian diplomat. He served in various diplomatic roles from 1965 onwards, and was Ambassador of Russia to Belarus between 1996 and 1999, and Permanent Representative of Russia to International Organizations in Vienna from 1999 to 2001. He was also a deputy minister of Foreign Affairs from 2001 to 2002, First Deputy Minister of Foreign Affairs from 2002 to 2005, Permanent Representative of Russia to the UN Office and other International Organizations in Geneva, and concurrently Permanent Representative of Russia to the Conference on Disarmament, from 2005 to 2011.

== Career ==
Loshchinin was born on 11 September 1940, in Moscow, then part of the Russian Soviet Federative Socialist Republic, in the Soviet Union. He graduated from the Belarusian State University in 1964, and the following year entered the Soviet diplomatic service as an employee of the Byelorussian Soviet Socialist Republic's Ministry of Foreign Affairs in 1965, becoming third secretary there. Loshchinin studied at the Diplomatic Academy of the Ministry of Foreign Affairs, graduating in 1977, and joining the Soviet Ministry of Foreign Affairs that year. Between 1989 and 1995 he was deputy Permanent Representative of the Soviet Union, and after the dissolution of the Soviet Union in 1991, the Russian Federation, to the UN Office and other International Organizations in Geneva.

From 1995 to 1996, Loshchinin was director of the Foreign Ministry's Second European Department. This was followed by a posting from 25 November 1996 to 24 February 1999 as an ambassador of Russia to Belarus. From 18 March 1999 to 7 April 2001, Loshchinin was the Permanent Representative of Russia to International Organizations in Vienna.

On 7 April 2001, Loshchinin was appointed a deputy minister of Foreign Affairs. On 17 October 2001, he was appointed a secretary of state in this role. On 22 February 2002, he was further promoted to become First Deputy Minister of Foreign Affairs. He had responsibility for supervising bilateral relations with the Commonwealth of Independent States countries, relations with the Federal Assembly, and the federal subjects of Russia, socio-political organizations, personnel, consular issues, and issues of state protocol. He was released from this work on 26 December 2005, and was that same day appointed the Permanent Representative of Russia to the UN Office and other International Organizations in Geneva, and concurrently Permanent Representative of Russia to the Conference on Disarmament. He held this post until 5 December 2011.

After retiring from the Ministry of Foreign Affairs, Loshchinin served as assistant to the Chairman of the Federation Council from 2012 until 2015.

Loshchinin died on 14 March 2023, at the age of 82. Loshchinin's obituary by the Russian Foreign Ministry noted that he was "an outstanding diplomat and statesman." In addition to his native Russian, Loshchinin spoke English and French.

== Honours and awards ==
Over his career Loshchinin had received several awards and honours. He received the Order of Friendship on 5 April 1999, and the Order "For Merit to the Fatherland" Fourth Class on 21 September 2003. He received the next level of the award, the Order "For Merit to the Fatherland" Third Class, on 12 March 2010. On 8 September 2015, he was awarded the Order of Alexander Nevsky.

Belarus awarded Loshchinin their Order of the Friendship of Peoples on 25 August 2005, and on 9 December 2015 he was awarded the Belarusian Order of Honor, receiving the award from the Belarusian ambassador to Russia Igor Petrishenko at a ceremony at the Embassy of Belarus, Moscow on 11 February 2016. Loshchinin also received the honorary title Honored Employee of the Diplomatic Service of the Russian Federation, on 10 February 2012.
