= Russia–Tajikistan relations =

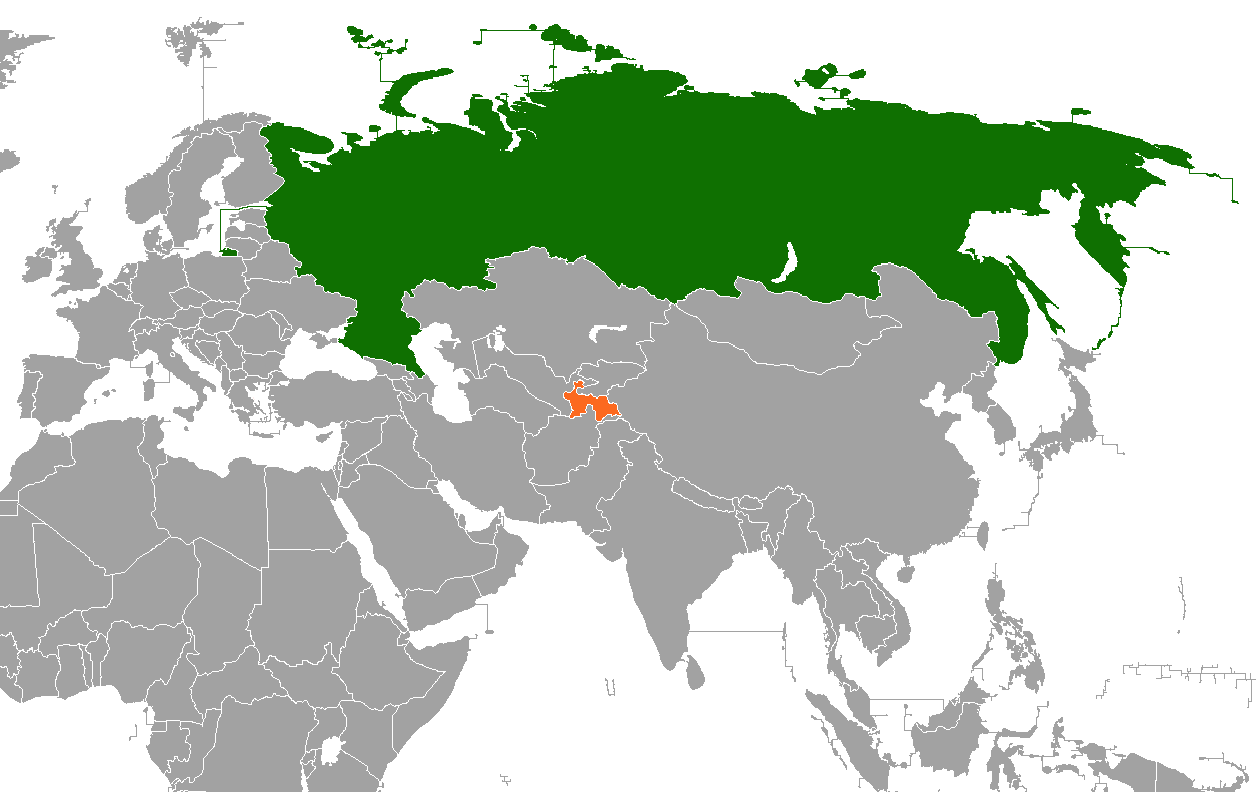

- Russia: Tajikistan

Diplomatic mission
- Embassy of Russia, Dushanbe: Embassy of Tajikistan, Moscow

Envoy
- Ambassador of the Russian Federation to Tajikistan Semyon Grigoriev: Ambassador of Tajikistan to the Russian Federation Davlatshoh Gulmakhmadzoda

Russia–Tajikistan relations (Note: Russian: Российско-таджикские отношения, romanized: Rossijsko-tadžikskije otnošenija; Tajik: Муносибатҳои Тоҷикистон бо Русия, romanized: Munosibathoyi Tojikiston bo Rusiya) are the bilateral relations between the Russian Federation and Tajikistan.

Both countries were members of the Soviet Union from the 1920s to 1991, as well as the preceding Russian Empire.

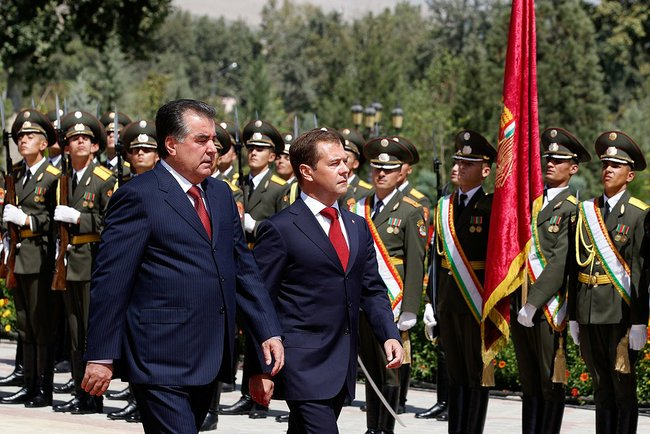
Dmitry Medvedev meets Emomali Rahmon in Tajikistan. September 2011.

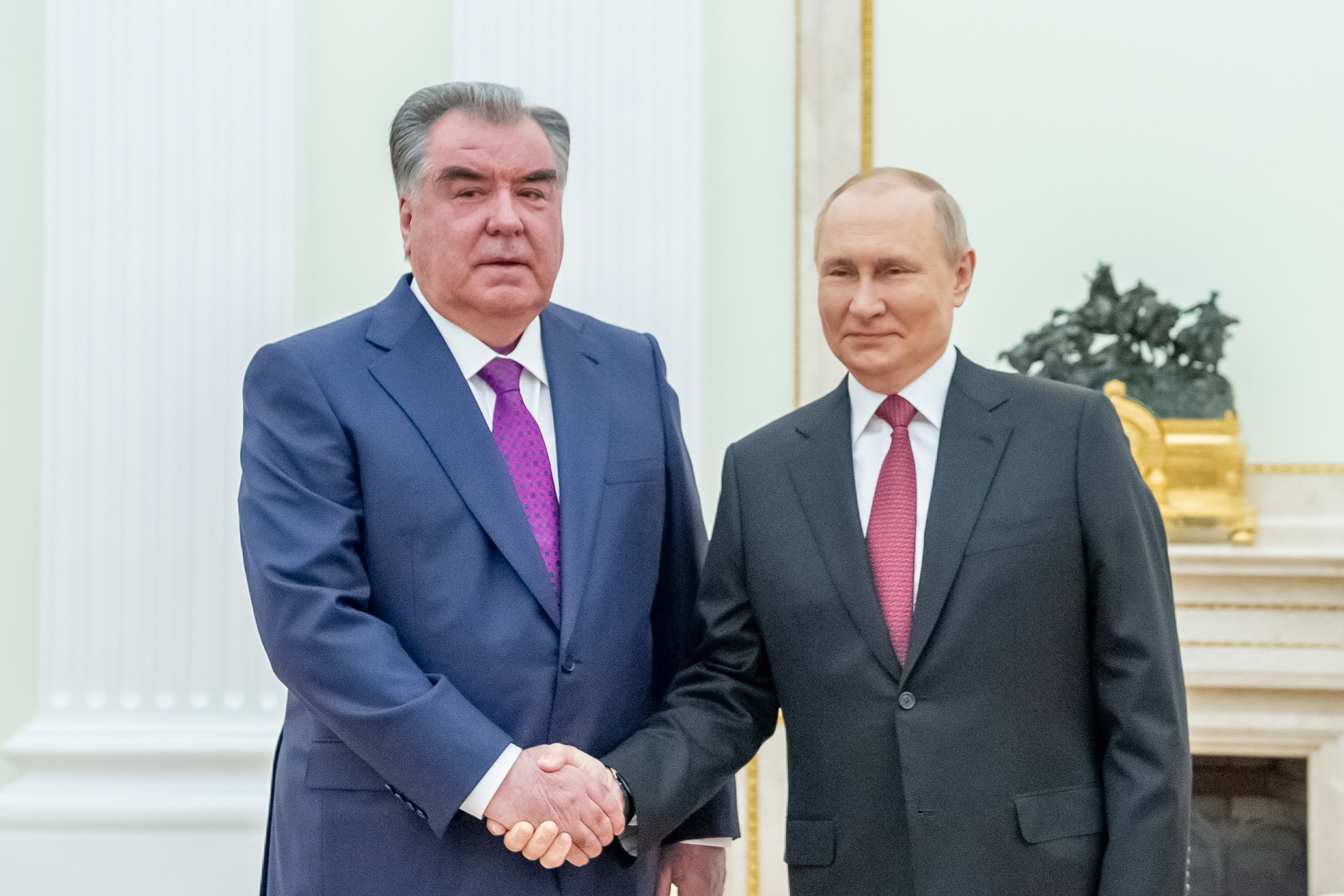
Emomali Rahmon and Russian President Vladimir Putin in Moscow, Russia, May 2022

Both countries are close allies and members of the Shanghai Cooperation Organisation, the military alliance formed by the Collective Security Treaty Organization, and the Commonwealth of Independent States. Tajikistan hosts Russian military units and infrastructure in Central Asia. Tajikistan and Russia also work closely together in issues concerning Afghanistan and are partners in anti-terrorism, anti-narcotics, and intelligence operations.

== History ==
Relations between Russia and what is now Tajikistan began with the Russian conquest of Central Asia during the 1800s. Tajikistan was ruled by the Emirate of Bukhara, which was conquered and made a protectorate by the Russian Empire in 1873. During this period, Russia imported large amounts of cotton from Tajikistan. Russian troops were involved in putting down several rebellions, including many Jadidist revolts. In 1916, there were many clashes in Bukhara over civilians being drafted into the Russian Army to serve in World War I, as well as unfair taxation.

During the Russian Civil War, Basmachi revolutionaries in Kokand rebelled from Russian rule, forming the Turkestan Autonomy. The Red Army launched several offensives against this new state throughout the late 1910s and early 1920s, eventually annexing it into the Soviet Union. A new republic was created for Tajiks, known as the Tajik Soviet Socialist Republic.

Soviet rule was highly centralised around Moscow and the Russian SFSR, and dissent against the USSR authorities led to the 1990 Dushanbe riots. After the collapse of the Soviet Union, Tajikistan declared independence from Moscow in September 1991.

Since 1992, Russia has allowed Tajik nationals dual citizenship of Russia and Tajikistan.

On May 25, 1993, a Treaty of Friendship, Cooperation and Mutual Assistance was signed between the two countries.

Tajikistan is highly dependent on the remittances coming from Russia. In 2012, it received US$3.595 billion in migrant remittances, equalling some 48% of its GDP. Some 1.5 million Tajiks work abroad, mostly in Russia.

After the International Criminal Court issued an arrest warrant for Russian President Vladimir Putin during the Russia's invasion of Ukraine in March 2023, Putin will be subject to arrest by the Tajik authorities if he ever visits the country. Tajikistan is a signatory of the ICC Rome Statute while Russia does not after it withdrew in 2016 after its annexation of Crimea in 2014.

The current Ambassador of Russia to Tajikistan is Semyon Grigoryev. The current Ambassador of Tajikistan to Russia is Davlatshoh Gulmakhmadzoda.

The suspects in the Crocus City Hall attack were officially identified as citizens of Tajikistan. On 25 March 2024, Tajik authorities arrested nine people from Vahdat District on suspicion of involvement with the attackers. Russia has a large number of Central Asian migrant workers, including those from Tajikistan. The precarious position of Tajik migrants increased after the Crocus City Hall attack.

== Resident diplomatic missions ==
of Russia in Tajikistan

- Dushanbe (Embassy)
- Khujand (Consulate-General)

of Tajikistan in Russia

- Moscow (Embassy)
- Moscow (Consulate-General)
- Novosibirsk (Consulate-General)
- Saint Petersburg (Consulate-General)
- Ufa (Consulate-General)
- Yekaterinburg (Consulate-General)

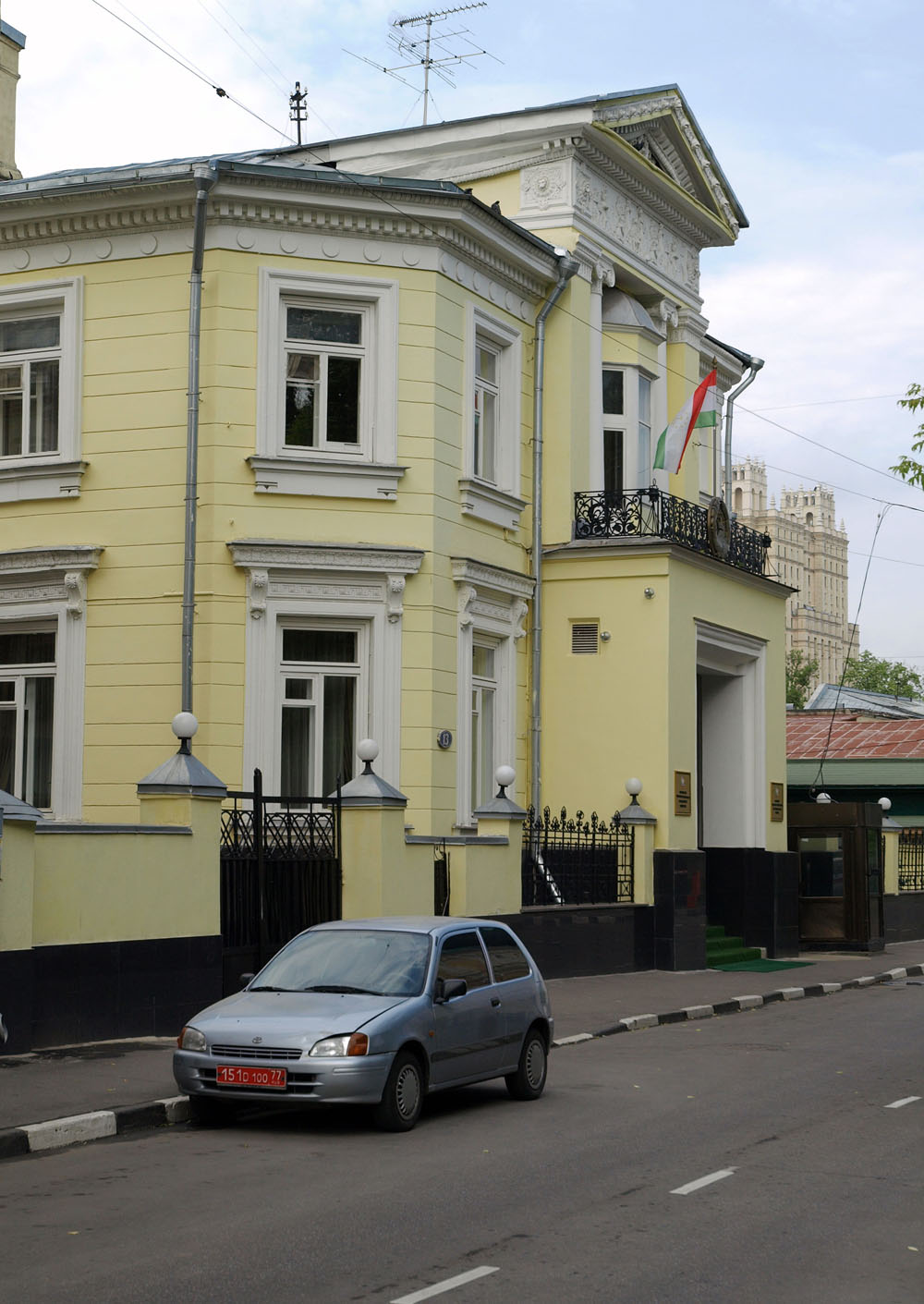
Embassy of Tajikistan in Moscow

Consulate-General of Tajikistan in Moscow

== See also ==
- Foreign relations of Russia
- Foreign relations of Tajikistan
- Immigration to Russia
- Illegal immigration to Russia
- List of ambassadors of Russia to Tajikistan
