= Marrakech Platform =

African anti-terror initiative

- Formation: 2022
- Type: Intergovernmental platform
- Region served: Africa
- Members: African states
- Parent organization: United Nations Office of Counter-Terrorism
- Website: www.un.org/counterterrorism

The Marrakech Platform is an intergovernmental initiative established in 2022 in Marrakesh, Morocco, to enhance regional cooperation in counter-terrorism across the African continent. The platform facilitates the exchange of information, expertise, and best practices among African countries to address shared security challenges related to terrorism and violent extremism.

Jointly supervised by the Kingdom of Morocco and the United Nations Office of Counter-Terrorism (UNOCT), the Marrakech Platform serves as a regional forum for dialogue and coordination. It aims to promote a comprehensive and collaborative approach to counter-terrorism, tailored to the evolving threats facing Africa.

== History ==
The Marrakech Platform was established in 2022 as a joint initiative between the Kingdom of Morocco and the United Nations Office of Counter-Terrorism to address the growing threat of terrorism and violent extremism in Africa. The platform was conceived as a mechanism to foster regional cooperation and capacity-building among African states.

Since its inception, the platform has held multiple sessions aimed at reinforcing dialogue and operational coordination. The third session, held in Fez, Morocco, saw participation from around 60 delegations, including UN Member States, African partners, and international organizations, reflecting increasing international confidence in the initiative.

== Objectives ==
The platform seeks to:

- Improve coordination among African states on counter-terrorism policies and operations.
- Strengthen institutional capacities through training and technical assistance.
- Facilitate the sharing of intelligence and threat assessments.
- Support the development of national and regional counter-terrorism strategies.

== Significance ==
The UNOCT identifies Africa as a priority region in its global counter-terrorism strategy. During the third high-level meeting of the Marrakech Platform, Under-Secretary-General Vladimir Voronkov acknowledged Morocco’s support for the initiative and highlighted the platform's role in advancing regional cooperation. He described the Marrakech Platform as a valuable contribution to multilateral efforts in addressing terrorism on the continent. Voronkov emphasized that the complex and evolving nature of the terrorist threat in Africa necessitates coordinated, multi-agency, and multilateral responses.

== Sessions ==
=== First Session ===
The inaugural high-level meeting of the Marrakech Platform was held in Marrakesh, Morocco, in 2022. It marked the official launch of the initiative, bringing together heads of counter-terrorism and security agencies from African countries, along with representatives from the United Nations Office of Counter-Terrorism. The meeting aimed to establish a framework for regional cooperation, strengthen institutional capacities, and promote the exchange of information and expertise in counter-terrorism. The launch underscored the commitment of Morocco and the UNOCT to support African-led efforts to combat terrorism and violent extremism.

=== Second Session ===
The second high-level meeting of heads of counter-terrorism and security agencies in Africa was held in Tangier, Morocco, starting on June 3, 2023. It saw wide participation from heads of counter-terrorism and security agencies from various African countries, as well as representatives from international and regional organizations concerned with counter-terrorism. Discussions focused on enhancing the capabilities of African countries in counter-terrorism, sharing best practices, and developing new mechanisms for regional cooperation. Morocco's hosting of the second meeting of the Marrakech Platform embodies the kingdom's commitment to combating terrorism at both regional and international levels.

=== Third Session ===
The third high-level meeting of heads of counter-terrorism and security agencies in Africa was held in Fez, starting on June 4, 2024. It witnessed wide participation from representatives of African countries and international and regional organizations. The focus was on:

- Exchanging information and expertise in counter-terrorism.
- Enhancing cooperation among African countries in this field.
- Developing new strategies to combat terrorism and extremism.
- Utilizing modern technologies in counter-terrorism efforts.

During the opening of the third session, the Minister of Foreign Affairs, Nasser Bourita, highlighted the royal vision for African cooperation. Bourita emphasized that the Marrakech Platform aligns perfectly with the insightful vision of His Majesty King Mohammed VI, based on the principles of African belonging and Africa's ability to find solutions to its challenges and take necessary initiatives in this direction.

== Development ==
Since its establishment, the Marrakech Platform has expanded both in scope and participation. The increasing involvement of United Nations Member States, African governments, and regional and international organizations reflects its growing role as a trusted framework for fostering regional cooperation in counter-terrorism.
