= Honored Employee of the Diplomatic Service (Russia) =

Honored Employee of the Diplomatic Service of the Russian Federation
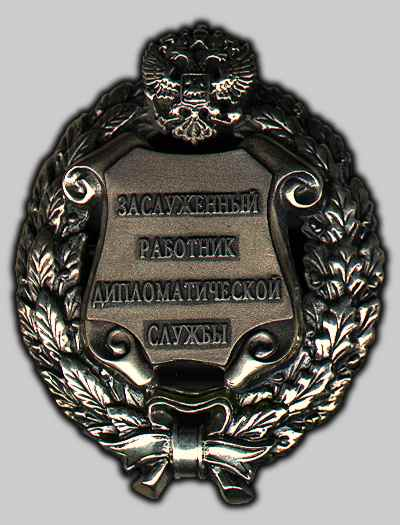
- Honored Employee of the Diplomatic Service of the Russian Federation
- Type: Honorary title
- Presented by: Russian Federation
- Eligibility: Employees of the diplomatic service
- Status: Active
- Established: 30 March 1998
- First award: 15 June 1999
- Final award: 5 May 2025

Highlights
- Total: 57

Honored Employee of the Diplomatic Service of the Russian Federation is an honorary title included in the system of state awards of the Russian Federation.

== Grounds for Award ==
The title "Honored Employee of the Diplomatic Service of the Russian Federation" is awarded to highly professional employees of the diplomatic service of the Russian Federation for personal merit in:

- Developing and successfully implementing a foreign policy course that allows defending and promoting the interests of the Russian Federation in the world and ensuring its leading position in major international organizations;
- Developing and strengthening political and economic ties between the Russian Federation and foreign states;
- Protecting the interests of the state, the rights of citizens, and legal entities of the Russian Federation abroad;
- Organizing foreign policy events with the participation of the president of the Russian Federation;
- Educating and training qualified personnel for the diplomatic service of the Russian Federation.

As a rule, the honorary title "Honored Employee of the Diplomatic Service of the Russian Federation" is awarded no earlier than 20 years from the start of professional activity, and provided that the person nominated for the award has awards (incentives) from federal government bodies, other federal state bodies, or government bodies of the constituent entities of the Russian Federation.

== Procedure for Awarding ==
Honorary titles of the Russian Federation are awarded by decrees of the President of the Russian Federation based on submissions made to him as a result of reviewing the petition for awarding and the proposal of the Commission under the President of the Russian Federation for State Awards.

== History of the Title ==
The honorary title was established by Decree of the President of the Russian Federation of March 30, 1998, No. 319 "On Amendments to the Decree of the President of the Russian Federation of December 30, 1995 No. 1341 "On the Establishment of Honorary Titles of the Russian Federation, Approval of Regulations on Honorary Titles and Descriptions of the Badge for Honorary Titles of the Russian Federation"".

By the same decree, the initial Regulations on the honorary title were approved, which stated:

The honorary title "Honored Worker of the Diplomatic Service of the Russian Federation" is awarded to highly professional diplomatic service employees for merit in the development and implementation of foreign policy of the Russian Federation, protecting the interests of the state, the rights of citizens, and legal entities abroad, training diplomatic personnel, and having served in the diplomatic service for 20 years or more.

The current Regulations on the honorary title were approved by Decree of the President of the Russian Federation of September 7, 2010, No. 1099 "On Measures to Improve the State Awards System of the Russian Federation".

== Breast Badge ==
The breast badge has a uniform shape for honorary titles of the Russian Federation and is made of silver, 40 mm high and 30 mm wide. It is in the shape of an oval wreath formed by laurel and oak branches. The crossed ends of the branches are tied with a ribbon at the bottom. At the top of the wreath is the State Coat of Arms of the Russian Federation. On the obverse, in the central part, a cartouche is superimposed on the wreath with the inscription – the name of the honorary title.

On the reverse side, there is a pin for attaching the breast badge to clothing. The breast badge is worn on the right side of the chest.

== See also ==
- List of Honored Employee's of the Diplomatic Service of the Russian Federation (on the Russian Wikipedia)
- Ministry of Foreign Affairs (Russia)
- Permanent Representatives of Russia to international organisations

== Reading list ==
- Shchegolev, K. A. (2009). Modern Awards of Russia: Traditions and Continuity. History of Awards. M.: Veche. pp. 369–370. ISBN 978-5-9533-3696-3.
- Vinokurov, V. A. (2012). The System of State Awards of the Russian Federation: History, Modernity and Development Prospects. M.: Delo. p. 243. ISBN 978-5-7749-0725-0.
- Goncharov, A. I. (2010). The Award System of the Russian Federation. M.: Posev. p. 254.
