= Nasser Bourita =

Moroccan diplomat (born 1969)

His Excellency Nasser Bourita
- ناصر بوريطة
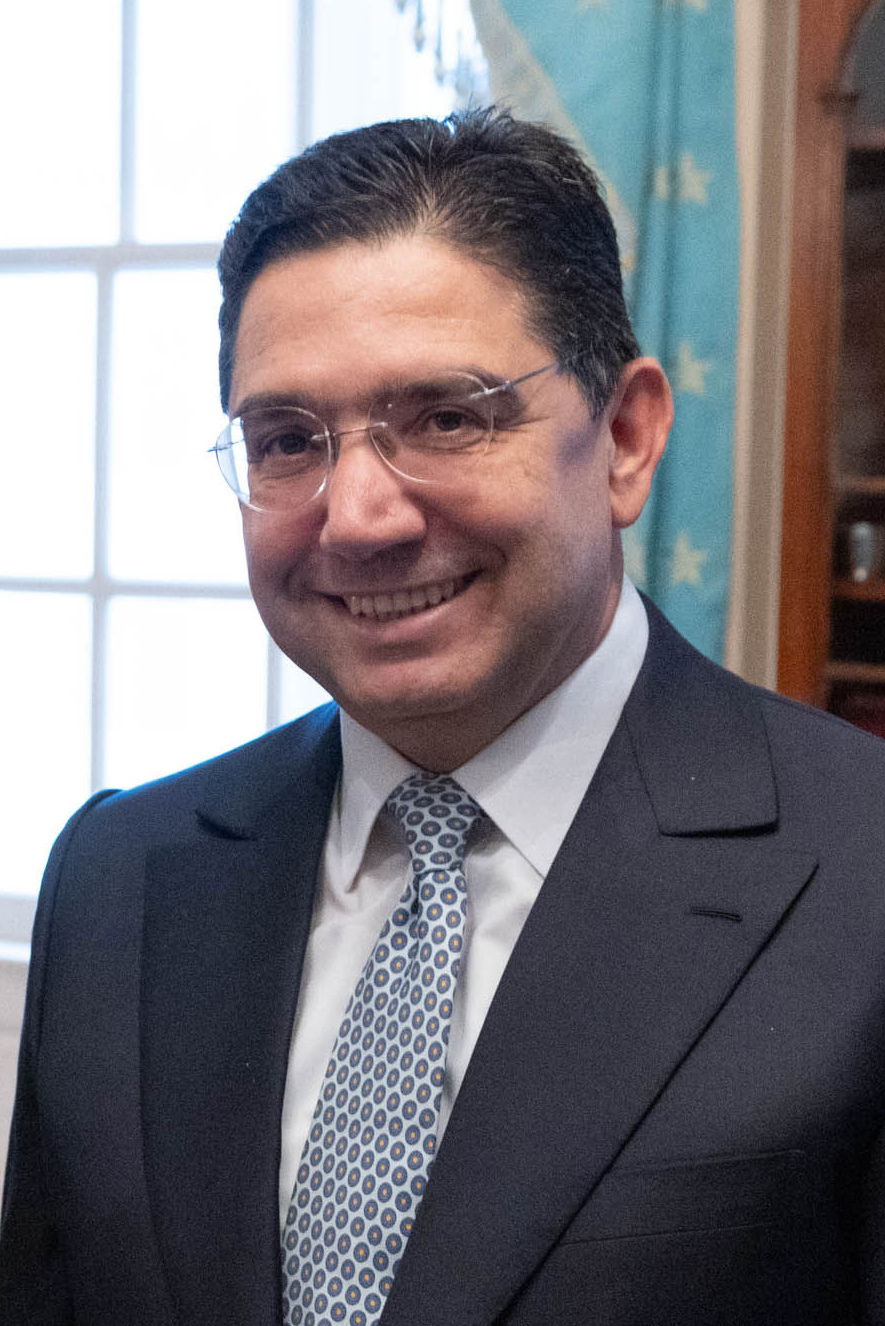
- Bourita in 2024

Minister of Foreign Affairs, African Cooperation and Moroccan Expatriates
- Incumbent
- Assumed office 5 April 2017
- Monarch: Mohammed VI
- Prime Minister: Saadeddine Othmani; Aziz Akhannouch
- Preceded by: Salaheddine Mezouar

Personal details
- Born: 27 May 1969 (age 57) Taounate, Morocco
- Education: Mohammed V University

Nasser Bourita (Arabic: ناصر بوريطة; born 27 May 1969) is a Moroccan diplomat serving as the Minister of Foreign Affairs, African Cooperation and Moroccan Expatriates since 5 April 2017.

== Education ==
Bourita was born in Taounate, Morocco. In 1991, he obtained his bachelor's degree in public law from the Mohammed V University in Rabat.

== Career ==
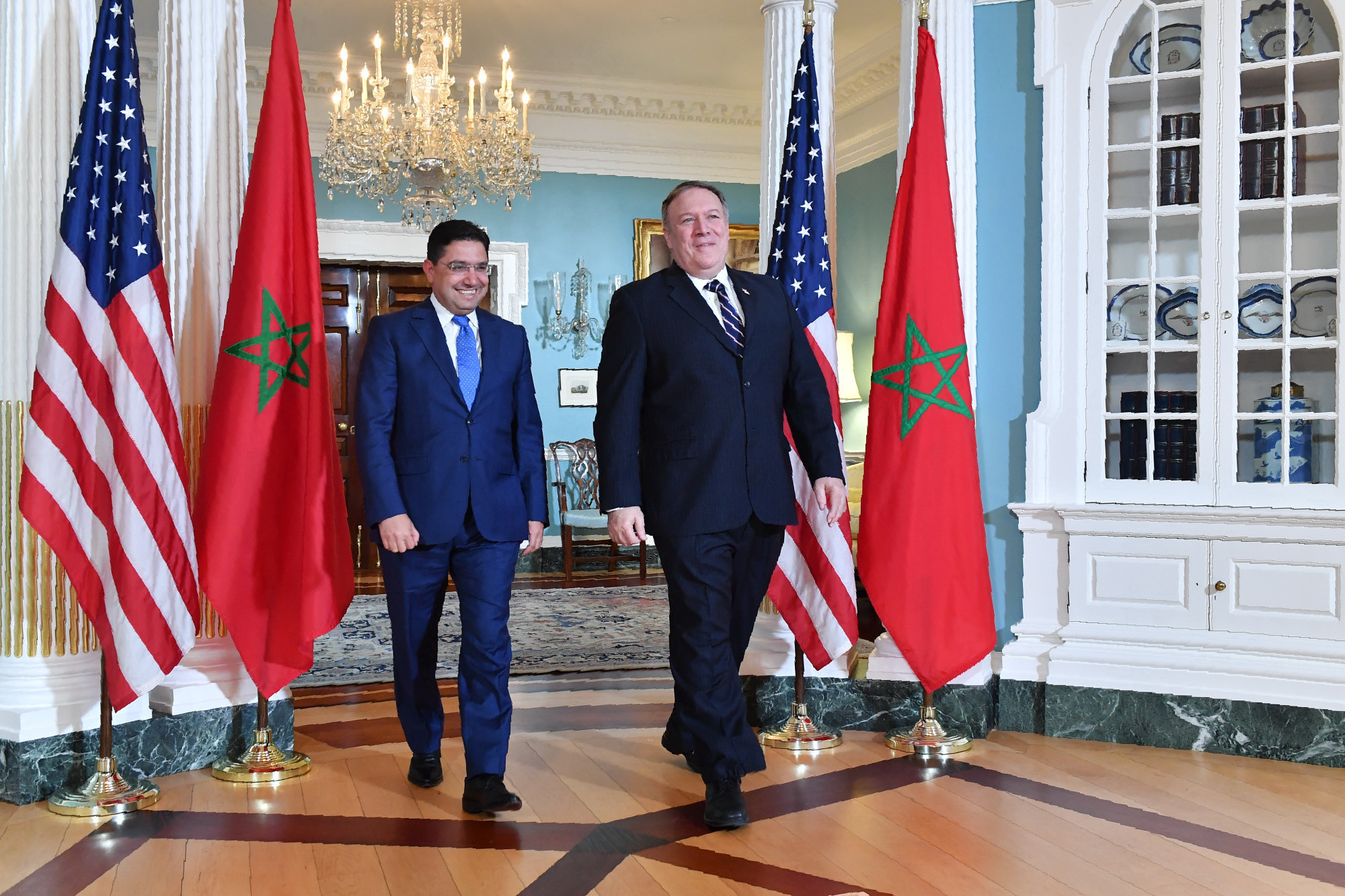
Secretary Pompeo meets with Moroccan Foreign Minister Nasser Bourita, at the Department of State, September 17, 2018

Bourita joined the Directorate of Multilateral Cooperation at the Ministry of Foreign Affairs in Rabat in 1992. From 1995 to 2002, he was the first secretary at the Moroccan Embassy in Vienna. In 2002, he was head of the United Nations Main Organs Department. In 2002, he was also appointed advisor to the Moroccan Mission to the European Communities in Brussels. From December 2003 to 2006, Bourita was head of Division of the UN.

He was appointed Secretary General of the Ministry of Foreign Affairs and Cooperation in 2011 and then Minister Delegate to the Minister of Foreign Affairs and Cooperation in 2016. In 2017, Bourita was named Minister of Foreign Affairs in the government of Saadeddine Othmani.

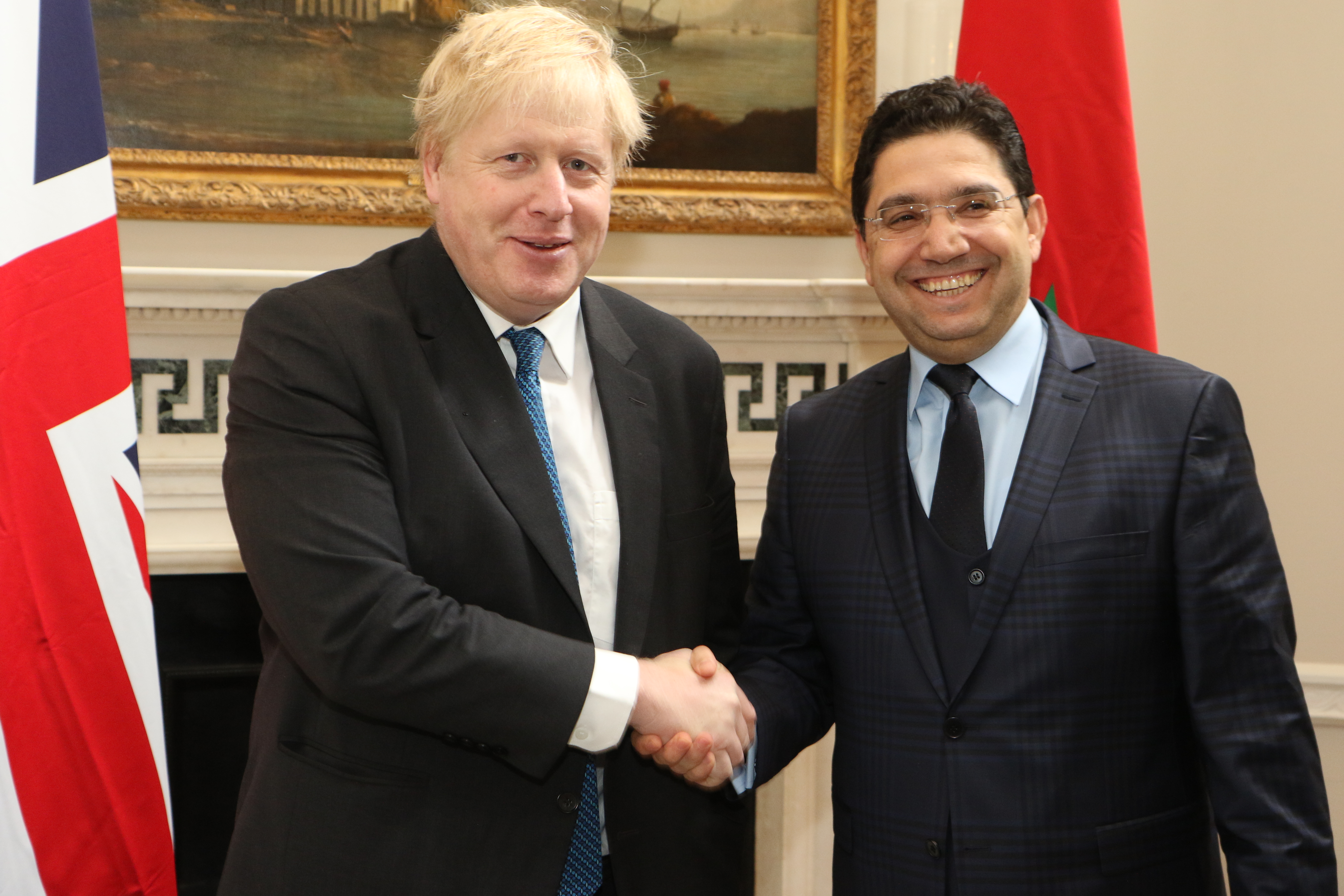
UK Foreign Secretary Boris Johnson meeting Moroccan Foreign Minister Nasser Bourita in London, 3 May 2018

During his tenure, Morocco severed diplomatic relations with Iran over alleged support for the Polisario Front. Bourita also frequently received letters of credence from foreign ambassadors. In November 2018, he attended the inaugural Paris Peace Forum.

On 7 October 2021, he was reappointed head of Moroccan Foreign Affairs in the government of Aziz Akhannouch.

On 29 October 2022, Bourita arrived in Algeria, to participate in the preparatory meeting of foreign ministers for the Arab League Council. He also represented the king, at the 2022 Arab League summit and was welcomed by Abdelmadjid Tebboune.

On 11 November 2022, Bourita attended the 5th Paris Peace Forum. On 21 November 2022, Bourita met with the US Ambassador to Morocco, Puneet Talwar, at the Ministry of Foreign Affairs in Rabat.

In March 2023, the moderate Islamist Justice and Development Party (PJD), which formerly led government from 2011 to 2021, accused Bourita of "defending the zionist entity [Israel]... at a time the Israeli occupation continues its criminal aggression against our Palestinian brothers". The royal cabinet subsequently issued a statement rebuking the PJD, adding that Morocco's foreign policy was a prerogative of the king and would not be "subject to blackmail".

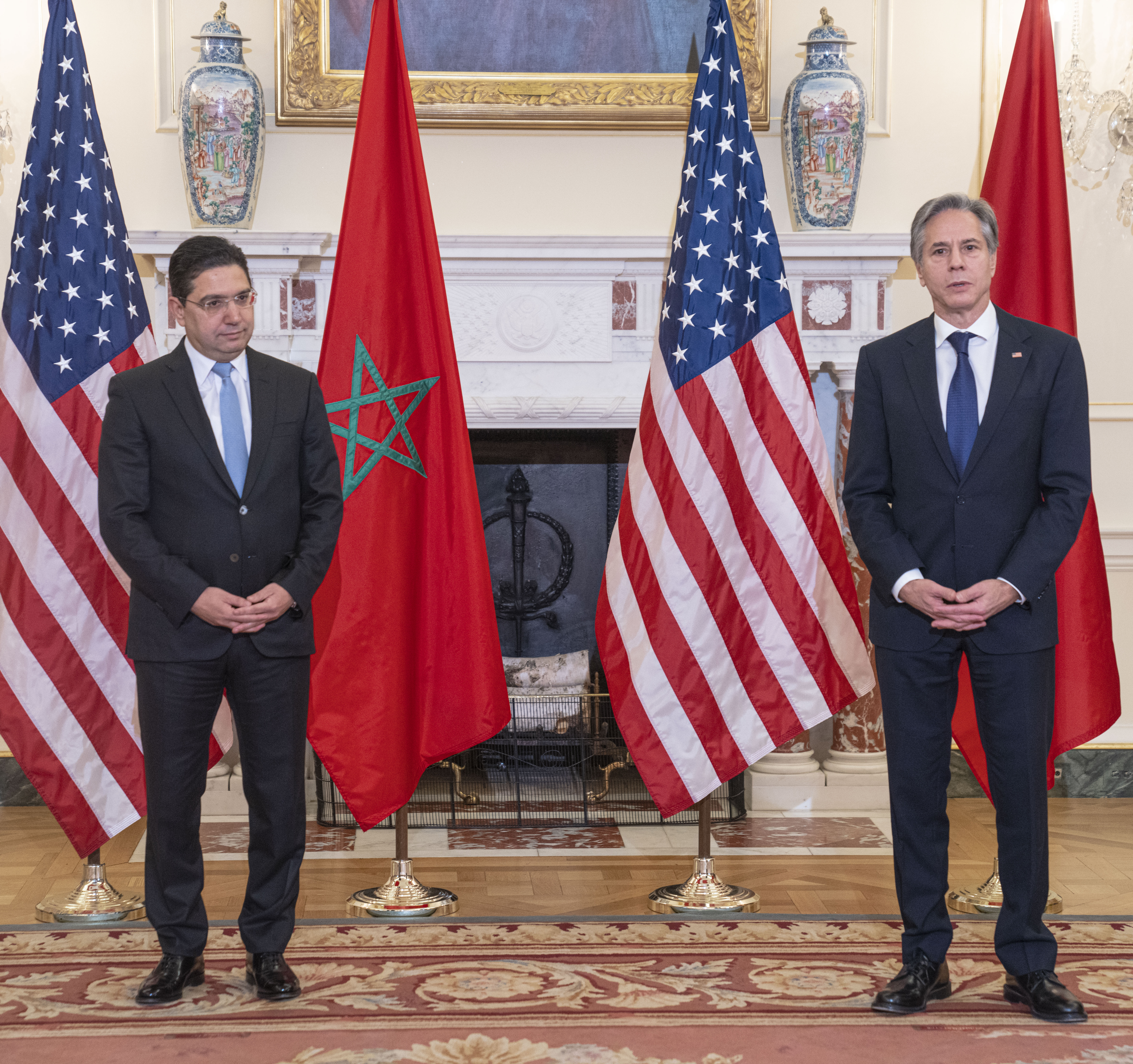
Secretary of State Antony Blinken meets with Moroccan Foreign Minister Nasser Bourita at the U.S. Department of State in Washington, D.C., on November 22, 2021

On 11 October 2023, Arab foreign ministers held an emergency meeting in Cairo, headed by Morocco, to discuss ways to stop the escalation in the Palestinian territories, and the targeting of civilians during the Gaza war. This meeting was chaired by Nasser Bourita, by the request of Morocco and Palestine. Bourita spoke with U.S. Secretary of State Antony J. Blinken, both discussed efforts to prevent a regional escalation and secure the release of hostages. On 21 October, Bourita and other world leaders along with the United Nations took part in the Cairo peace summit to de-escalate the war.

On 4 June 2024, Bourita delivered a speech at the Marrakech Platform, highlighting the cooperation between African countries to fight terrorism. This mirrored his contribution to the Platform in 2023. He praised the strategic partnership between Morocco and the United Nations Office of Counter-Terrorism.

== Personal life ==
Bourita is married and has two children. He speaks Arabic, French, English and Spanish.
