= List of ambassadors of Russia to Abkhazia =

Ambassador of the Russian Federation to the Republic of Abkhazia
- Emblem of the Russian Foreign Ministry
- Incumbent; Vyacheslav Gladkov since 26 June 2026
- Ministry of Foreign Affairs; Embassy of Russia in Sukhumi
- Style: His Excellency; The Honourable
- Reports to: Minister of Foreign Affairs
- Seat: Sukhumi
- Appointer: President of Russia
- Term length: At the pleasure of the president
- Website: Embassy of Russia in Abkhazia

The ambassador of Russia to Abkhazia is the official representative of the president and the government of the Russian Federation to the president and the government of Abkhazia.

The ambassador and his staff work at large in the Russian embassy in Sukhumi. The current Russian ambassador to Abkhazia is Mikhail Shurgalin, incumbent since 31 May 2022.

== History of diplomatic relations ==
Following the dissolution of the Soviet Union in 1991, Russia and Georgia developed diplomatic relations. Tensions arose over Russia's support for the separatist regions of Abkhazia and South Ossetia, culminating in the Russo-Georgian War in August 2008, resulting in de facto control over the two regions. While most of the international community considers Abkhazia and South Ossetia to be de jure Georgian territories under Russian occupation, Russia and four other UN member states consider them to be independent. Russia officially recognized Abkhazia as independent on 6 August 2008, and established official diplomatic relations on 9 September 2008. Semyon Grigoryev was appointed the first ambassador to Abkhazia on 25 October 2008. Grigoriyev presented his Letters of Credence to President of Abkhazia, Sergey Bagapsh on 16 December 2008. The Russian embassy in Sukhumi opened on 1 May 2009.

== List of representatives of Russia to Abkhazia (2008–present) ==
Name	Title	Appointment	Termination	Notes
Semyon Grigoryev	Ambassador	25 October 2008	30 March 2018	Credentials presented on 16 December 2008
Aleksey Dvinyanin	Ambassador	30 March 2018	17 March 2022	Credentials presented on 15 May 2018
Maksim Litvinov	Chargé d'affaires	17 March 2022	31 May 2022	
Mikhail Shurgalin	Ambassador	31 May 2022	26 June 2026	Credentials presented on 21 July 2022
Vyacheslav Gladkov	Ambassador	26 June 2026		
