= UN Counter-Terrorism Implementation Task Force =

The UN Counter-Terrorism Implementation Task Force (CTITF) was an instrument designed to roll out the UN Global Counter-Terrorism Strategy.

Since its formation in 2005, the task force brought forth different initiatives that assist in the Counter Terrorism Strategy including the UN Counter Terrorism Handbook. Its working groups have offered workshops and presented reports that are designed to assist important UN actors, member states and stakeholders in the fight against terrorism.

== History ==
Before the CTITF was formed, the Security Council of the UN legally bound all member states through resolutions relating to the United Nations Charter. The resolutions included;

The United Nations Security Council Resolution 1267, adopted in October 1999 requires the Taliban in Afghanistan to stop providing refuge to terrorist organizations and demand that they cooperate in bringing terrorists to justice. This resolution also imposes aviation actions and financial sanctions on the Taliban. It also established the Security Council Committee.

The United Nations Security Council Resolution 1373, adopted in September 2001 under Chapter VII of the United Nations Charter. The aims of this resolution is to hinder terrorist actions. This resolution calls on states to adjust national laws to better combat terrorism and focuses on regulating immigration laws to contain the spread of terrorism. It also place legal obligations on member states requiring them to freeze any financial assets of terrorist and supporters, deny travel means or safe havens for terrorists, and prevent their weapon supply and recruitment.

These resolutions began the formation of branches in the United Nations to combat terrorism.

In 2005, the Secretary- General Kofi Annan created the United Nations Counter Terrorism Implementation Task Force. It was later endorsed by the General Assembly in 2006 through the United Nations Global Counter-Terrorism Strategy, to ensure that all terrorism units in the UN work together to increase the efficiency and range.

On 15 June 2017, the General Assembly established the United Nations Office of Counter-Terrorism (UNOCT), transferring the CTITF, as well as the United Nations Counter-Terrorism Centre (UNCCT), from the UN Department of Political Affairs to UNOCT.

== Makeup ==
The Secretary General appoints a senior United Nations official to act as the chair of the task force. The task force is divided into approximately 38 member entities including the World Bank, the Youth Envoy and the World Health Organization (WHO). and INTERPOL. The CTITF is divided into 4 subgroups; the United Nations Security Council, the Secretariat, the Agencies Programmes Funds and Observers. The goal of the CTITF is to maximize each of the entity's comparative advantage by delivering as one to help Member States implement the four pillars of the Global Strategy.

== Pillars of the CTITF ==
The intent of Counter Terrorism Implementation Task Force is to help states in the UN enforce the 4 building blocks that make up Global Strategy. The four Pillars are;

- Pillar 1- Methods of being aware of the circumstances that encourage possibilities of terrorism.
- Pillar 2- Methods preventing and combating terrorism.
- Pillar 3- Methods that allow states to be better equipped to fight terrorism and how the United Nations can help.
- Pillar 4- Methods that enforce the rule of law as the foundation of fighting terrorism and ensuring all have human rights.

The Counter Terrorism Implementation Task Force is responsible for ensuring all needs of member states in the United Nations are met and policies are supported.

== Status of Working Groups ==
The status of working groups has implemented a project on harmonized border management, compiling all recent international conventions, and best practices in an applicable, user-friendly format to help interested states build the institutional and procedural mechanisms for an effective border management system A working arrangement on harmonized border management has been completed by the working group. This idea will continue to be maximized through ongoing consultations with member states and international organizations.

== Entities ==
Entities of the United Nations Counter Terrorism Implementation Task Force involve;

Mobility and processing of people

Because the processes that allow travel and economic and cultural exchanges is exploited by terrorists, measures that are put in place to prevent terrorism have become explicitly linked to the management and regulation of movement across borders. These measures include implementing passenger integrated border-management systems, issuing secure travel documents, promoting exchange of information among stakeholders, training, and capacity-building. Improving in areas like this can help heighten security and immigration systems while also allowing the cross-border movement of people. Some of these measures are technologically complex, but more basic systems can be achieved in traditional areas of migration- management with a view to enhancing overall capacity

Movement and processing of goods

Global trade, as well as the international supply chain are vulnerable to manipulation by terrorists. In order to minimize this vulnerability, a range of measures should be taken, including ensuring receipt of advance electronic cargo information about inbound, outbound and transit shipments; employing a consistent risk-management approach to address threats to cargo security; using non-intrusive detection equipment; promoting cooperation among customs administrations (e.g. by performing outbound inspection of high-risk containers and cargo); and establishing partnerships with the private sector for the implementation of secure practices at every stage of the supply chain, through Authorized Economic Operator (AEO). The implementation of these and other measures is key in order to maximize security in international trade and facilitate the movement of goods across borders programmes

Maritime security

Over 90 per cent of the total goods traded internationally is transported from source to destination along the world's main global sea-trading routes he security of the maritime domain is therefore classified as a major problem of global importance. The aims of maritime security are to detect and deter security threats; to take preventive measures against security incidents affecting ships or port facilities; and to safeguard passengers, crews, ships and their cargoes, port facilities and the people who work and live in port areas, while still allowing for the safe and efficient movement of maritime trade. Effective implementation of the relevant legislative and practical security measures is necessary in order to prevent unlawful acts against the passengers and crew of ships engaged in international voyages and against the port facilities that serve them.

Early warning and alert systems

Border security is a dynamic and constantly changing process because the illegal cross-border movement of people affects not only the security, but also economic and social welfare of states. Comprehensive early-warning and alert systems are therefore key components of effective border management systems. They strengthen the collective capacity of states to detect, and combat terrorism, by facilitating inter-agency cooperation and the timely sharing and exchange of pertinent, reliable information, allow the enabling important decisions to be taken in a reasonable manner

Many international organizations with a border-control mandate and utilize early- warning and alert systems. Those tools include the WCO CEN and RILO networks; IMOSOLAS, LRIT and AIS; the Consolidated Lists of the Security Council “sanctions” committees, and the “I-24/7” secure global communications system, SLTD database and Notices regime of the International Criminal Police Organization (INTERPOL)

== Working Groups ==
The United Nations Secretariat, agencies, funds and programmes, and affiliated organizations contribute to the implementation of the United Nations Global Counter-Terrorism Strategy both through their individual mandates and through their membership in the Counter-Terrorism Implementation Task Force (CTITF)

Integrated Assistance for Countering Terrorism is an important working group in the Task force. The working group consists of representatives from different UN entities involved in putting the counter terrorism strategy in action for countries who wish to receive help from the UN.

In 2014, the inter-agency working groups of the CTITF were reformed in 2014 to help improve efficiency and effectiveness of the entities' in achieving results.

Some of the working groups currently in place include;

Border Management and Law Enforcement relating to Counter-Terrorism

This working group strives to allow guidance to Member States on implementation of legal, institutional and practical counter-terrorism-related border control measures required. It focuses on the following areas: terrorist mobility; integrity and security of travel documents; illicit movement of cash and bearer negotiable instruments; movement and processing of goods; illicit movement of small arms, light weapons, ammunition, explosives and weapons of mass destruction; aviation and maritime security; early-warning and alert systems. This Working Group was established to help Member States strengthen their border-management and border-control systems as set out in Pillar II, in paragraphs 4,5, 7, 8, 13 to 16 and Pillar III, in paragraphs 2, 4 and 11 to 13 of the United Nations Global Counter-Terrorism Strategy

Countering the Financing of Terrorism

This working group incorporates various international organizations and other united nations entities to reverse the funding of various forms of terrorism. This working group ensures the standard to countering the finance of terrorism is met according to the International Convention for the Suppression of the Financing of Terrorism and the Financial Action Task Force. The actions of the working group includes coordinating with different entities on the subject of repression of terrorism finances. From February 2007 to December 2008, multiple meetings took place with banks, financial intelligence, law enforcement, criminal justice experts, national security intelligence etc. to establish how to efficiently fight the financing of terrorism.

The conclusions from these meeting as to how to suppress terrorism financially include; the criminalization of terrorist financing, the enhancement of domestic and international cooperation, value transfer systems, non-profit organizations, and the freezing of assets. Based on the conclusions, the International Monetary Fund was able to prepare an action plan with motions for the employment of the above conclusions.

Foreign Terrorist Fighters (FTF)

This working group was formed on September 24, 2014, when Resolution 2178 was formed to monitor and control terrorism threats and foreign terrorist fighters. The definition of Foreign terrorist fighters is people who travel to a state outside of their own to involve themselves in terrorist activities (i.e. planning, preparing, perpetration terrorist acts, receiving or providing terrorism training etc.) The Security Council has stated that terrorist groups such as the Islamic state, Al-Qaida etc. have attracted over 30,000 foreign terrorist fighters.

National and Regional Counter-Terrorism Strategies

On June 29, 2012, the national and regional efforts to combat terrorism was expanded due to the encouragement from the General Assembly. This working group is used to assist in unrolling national counterterrorism strategies.

Preventing and Responding to WMD Terrorist Attacks

This working group is used to monitor the success of the UN strategies in response to terrorist attacks (nuclear, chemical, biological, radiological or any other type of weapons used). The group has formed a communal exchange of information among other UN entities and working groups such as knowledge on existing activities and emergency plans in response to WMD attacks.

Preventing Violent Extremism and Conditions Conducive to the Spread of Terrorism

Since February 2015, this working group has aided in the Secretary General's efforts to prevent violent extremism. The working group gave input on the effects of extremism and the causes of it. They also provided advice on how to assist member states in preventing violent extremism.

Promoting and Protecting Human Rights and the Rule of Law While Countering Terrorism

This working group was formed by member states to assure human rights are protected and the rule of law is obeyed. Pillar IV of the CTITF plays a large role in the implementation. The goal of this group is to gather information exchange on human rights and the rule of law capacity building surrounding the concept of counter terrorism. This working group has now set in place a support and assistance function available to member states to ensure human rights and the rule of law is well established. In April 2013, a global project was launched by this working group called Capacity Building and Training of Law Enforcement Officials on Human Rights, the Rule of Law and the Prevention of Terrorism. The goal of this project is to properly train law enforcement officials in charge of counter terrorism on human rights.

Protection of Critical Infrastructure Including Internet, Vulnerable Targets and Tourism Security

This working group's role is to uphold confidentiality, respecting human rights under international law. Their goals are to control efforts, both regionally and internationally to counter terrorism in its various forms on the internet as well as improve security of vulnerable targets such as infrastructure and public places. The objectives are to;

- establish ways to expedite the development and sharing of the most efficient methods on the protection of vulnerable sites, public spaces or critical infrastructure that are important to the state or internationally.
- fortify the competence of public and private sectors and to augment the development of public and private partnerships on protection of critical infrastructure, including Internet, cyber and tourism security, to prevent and react in an efficient manner to possible risks and threats to related facilities. This includes promoting awareness and comprehension of the balance required between economic and security issues.
- improve responsiveness and flexibility by having methods in place of planning, prevention, crisis management and recovery
- promote the exchange of information.
- support states in the implementation of the provisions of the UN Global Counter-Terrorism Strategy that are relevant to the working group's focus areas.

Supporting and Highlighting Victims of Terrorism

The role of this working group is to provide support and aids to victims of terrorism. They promote the rights of the victims through media platforms, workshops etc. The mandate of this working group is stated within Pillar I and Pillar IV stating the strategy seeks to “promote international solidarity in support of victims”, stress “the need to promote and protect the rights of victims of terrorism and their families and facilitate the normalization of their lives” and sees the “dehumanization of victims of terrorism” as a major concern that leads to the spread of terrorism.

Legal and Criminal Justice Responses to Terrorism

The three roles of this working group are; to help coordination in the UN regarding activities of various entities in the UN that are involved in supporting legal and criminal justice in response to terrorism, developing an approach for the UN in dealing with legal and criminal justice matters with regards to terrorism and to give advice and legal assistance to member states with involving legal and criminal justice regarding terrorism.

Gender Sensitive Approach to Preventing and Countering Terrorism

This working group was created because women began playing a more important role in the fight against terrorism as they are influential in regards to families, communities and governments. This working group is still in formation.

Working Group on Communications

This working group examines the adequacy of a communication and is allocated by the Human Rights Council Advisory Committee. Consisting of five independent and qualified experts representing five regional groups (geographically), the members, appointed for three years, meet twice a year for five business days to judge the adequacy and quality of communication. This includes examining if communication separately or in cooperation with other communications demonstrates a consistency of authentic and gross violations of human rights. As of 2017, the working group consists of Mario L. Coriolano (Argentina), Mikhael Lebedev (Russian Federation), Katharina Pabel (Austria), Changrok Soh (Rebulic of Korea) and Imeru Tamrat Yigezu (Ethiopia). This working group is still in formation.
