= Mikhail Ulyanov =

Mikhail Ulyanov may refer to:

- Mikhail Ulyanov (actor), actor
- Mikhail Ivanovich Ulyanov, diplomat
