= Vasily Sidorov =

Russian diplomat (1945–2020)

- Василий Сидоров

Permanent Representative of Russia to the UN Office and other International Organizations in Geneva
- In office 18 December 1997 – 31 July 2001
- Preceded by: Sergey Krylov
- Succeeded by: Leonid Skotnikov

Personal details
- Born: 2 January 1945 Moscow, Russian Soviet Federative Socialist Republic, USSR
- Died: 12 April 2020 (aged 75)
- Education: Moscow State Institute of International Relations

Vasily Sergeyevich Sidorov (Russian: Василий Сергеевич Сидоров; 2 January 1945 – 12 April 2020) was a Soviet and Russian diplomat. He served in various diplomatic roles since the 1970s, particularly with the United Nations bodies in New York and Geneva, ending his career as Permanent Representative of Russia to the UN Office and other International Organizations in Geneva.

== Diplomatic career ==
Sidorov was born on 2 January 1945 in Moscow, then in the Russian Soviet Federative Socialist Republic, in the Soviet Union. He studied at Moscow State Institute of International Relations, graduating from the faculty of international economic relations in 1967 and entering the Ministry of Foreign Affairs. He was initially assigned to work in the Fifth European Department, until being transferred overseas in 1968 to work in the Soviet embassy in Greece. This posting lasted until 1973, when he returned to the Soviet Union, and the Fifth European Department. He was again sent abroad, this time to the United States, in 1976, where he worked as the second, and later the first secretary of the Soviet's Permanent Mission to the United Nations in New York. This post lasted until 1981, when Sidorov returned to the Soviet Union and worked in the Office of International Organizations at the Ministry of Foreign Affairs, rising from first secretary, adviser, section head, department head and finally deputy head of the entire office. On 26 March 1991 he was appointed to the diplomatic rank of Envoy Extraordinary and Plenipotentiary 2nd class.

Sidorov returned overseas in 1991, heading to New York once more as deputy and then first deputy Permanent Representative of the Soviet Union to the United Nations. With the dissolution of the Soviet Union in late 1991, Sidirov remained in post, representing the Russian Federation, with the rank of Envoy Extraordinary and Plenipotentiary 1st class from 20 June 1994, and then Ambassador Extraordinary and Plenipotentiary from 2 March 1995, until November 1995 when he returned to Russia and was appointed a Deputy Minister of Foreign Affairs. On 18 December 1997 Sidirov took up his final posting as Permanent Representative of Russia to the United Nations Office and other International Organizations in Geneva. To prepare for his new post, he was dismissed as a deputy minister on 28 January 1998. On 17 April 1998 he was also appointed as Russia's representative to the Conference on Disarmament in Geneva, concurrently with his other posting. He held these posts in Geneva until his retirement in 2001. He was officially released from his duties on 31 July 2001.

== Retirement and death ==
Sidorov had served as Deputy Chairman of the National Committee of the Russian Federation for the Decade of International Law since July 1997. He had also been a Member of the Council on Foreign and Defence Policy. In addition to his native Russian, Sidorov spoke English, Greek and French. In retirement he worked at the telecommunications company MegaFon as Director for Foreign Economic Relations since 2001.

Vasily Sidorov died on 12 April 2020. In its obituary the Russian Ministry of Foreign Affairs described him as "a highly qualified diplomat, a sensitive leader, a confident and firm defender of Russia's position and interests."
