= Permanent Representatives of Russia to international organisations =

The following is a list of permanent representatives of Russia to international organisations.

== United Nations ==
The permanent representatives of the Russian Federation to the United Nations in the New York City, United States and representatives of the Russian Federation in the Security Council of the United Nations

1. Yuli Vorontsov (until 23 July 1994, № 1536)
2. Sergey Lavrov (7 July 1994, № 1475 - 12 July 2004, № 871)
3. Andrey Denisov (12 July 2004, № 873 - 8 April 2006, № 334)
4. Vitaly Churkin (8 April 2006, № 336 - 20 February 2017)
5. Pyotr Ilichov (Acting) (20 February 2017 - 27 July 2017)
6. Vasily Nebenzya (from 27 July 2017, № 340)

== UN office in Geneva ==
Russia's permanent representative to the UN Office and other International Organizations in Geneva, Switzerland

1. Yevgeny Makeyev (until 19 October 1993, № 1663)
2. Andrey Kolosovsky (11 October 1993, № 1664 - 11 December 1996, № 1664)
3. Sergey Krylov (11 December 1996, № 1665 - 3 September 1997, № 977)
4. Vasily Sidorov (18 December 1997, № 1344 - 31 July 2001, № 941)
5. Leonid Skotnikov (31 July 2001, № 942 - 26 December 2005, № 1528)
6. Valery Loshchinin (26 December 2005, № 1529 - 5 December 2011, № 1583)
7. Aleksey Borodavkin (5 December 2011, № 1585 - 31 January 2018, № 34)
8. Gennady Gatilov (from 31 January 2018, № 35)

== UNESCO ==
The permanent representatives of the Russian Federation to the United Nations Educational, Scientific and Cultural Organization (UNESCO) - Russia's permanent representative to UNESCO in Paris, France

1. Vladimir Lomeiko (until 22 September 1993, № 1402)
2. Mikhail Fedotov (22 September 1993, № 1403 - 24 January 1998, № 67)
3. Yevgeny Sidorov (24 January 1998, № 68 - 4 June 2002, № 549)
4. Vladimir Kalamanov (4 June 2002, № 551 - 28 January 2009, № 93)
5. Eleonora Mitrofanova (28 January 2009, № 94 - 19 September 2016, № 478)
6. Aleksandr Kuznetsov (19 September 2016, № 479 - 12 January 2023, № 7)
7. Rinat Alyautdinov (from 12 January 2023, № 8)

== UN International Organisations in Vienna ==
The permanent representatives of the Russian Federation to international organizations in Vienna, Austria

1. Roland Timerbaev (until 10 February 1992, № 130)
2. Yuri Zaitsev (10 February 1992, № 132 – 24 March 1995, № 315)
3. Oleg Sokolev (24 March 1995, № 316 – 18 March 1999, № 359)
4. Valery Loshchinin (18 March 1999, № 360 – 7 April 2001, № 409)
5. Grigory Berdennikov (7 April 2001, № 410 – 9 January 2007, № 13)
6. Aleksandr Zmeyevsky (9 January 2007, № 14 – 26 July 2011, № 989)
7. Vladimir Voronkov (26 July 2011, № 990 – 7 August 2017, № 368)
8. Mikhail Ulyanov (from 23 January 2018, № 19)

== UN Office in Nairobi ==
The permanent representatives of the Russian Federation to international organizations in Nairobi, Kenya (representatives are concurrently appointed ambassador to Kenya)

1. Vladimir Kitaev (until 1 September 1992, № 1040)
2. Boris Mayorsky (1 September 1992, № 1041 - 21 July 1998, № 858)
3. Boris Tsepov (21 July 1998, № 859 - 5 December 2000, № 1969)
4. Aleksandr Ignatyev (5 December 2000, № 1970 - 27 July 2005, № 882)
5. Valery Yegoshkin (27 July 2005, № 883 - 23 December 2010, № 1585)
6. Aleksandr Makarenko (23 December 2010, № 1586 - 4 May 2018, № 191)
7. Dmitry Maksimychev (from 4 May 2018, № 192 — 20 August 2024, № 710)
8. Vsevolold Tkachenko (from 20 August 2024, № 711)

== United Nations Economic and Social Commission for Asia and the Pacific ==
Russia's permanent representative to the United Nations Economic and Social Commission for Asia and the Pacific (ESCAP) in Bangkok, Thailand (representatives are concurrently appointed ambassador to Thailand)

1. Oleg Bostorin (until 6 September 1997, № 999)
2. Valery Malygin (6 September 1997, № 1000 - 29 January 2001, № 84)
3. Yevgeny Ostrovenko (29 January 2001, № 85 - 9 November 2004, № 1420)
4. Yevgeny Afanasyev (9 November 2004, № 1421 - 3 February 2010, № 134)
5. Aleksandr Mariyasov (3 February 2010, № 135 - 25 August 2014, № 579)
6. Kirill Barsky (25 August 2014, № 580 - 2 November 2018, № 628)
7. Yevgeny Tomikhin (from 2 November 2018, № 629)

== European Union ==
Permanent representative of the Russian Federation to the European Union in Brussels, Belgium

1. Ivan Silayev (18 December 1991, № 303 - 7 February 1994, № 249)
2. Vasily Likhachev (5 May 1998, № 490 - 11 March 2003, № 317)
3. Mikhail Fradkov (14 May 2003, № 526 - 5 March 2004, № 299)
4. Vladimir Chizhov (15 July 2005, № 802 — 26 September 2022, № 665)
5. Kirill Logvinov (acting, 26 September 2022 — November 2024)
6. Karen Malayan (acting, from November 2024)

== Organization for Security and Co-operation in Europe ==
Russia's permanent representative to the Organization for Security and Co-operation in Europe (OSCE) in Vienna, Austria

1. Yuri Ushakov (13 May 1996, № 705 - 6 January 1998, № 8)
2. Oleg Belous (6 January 1998, № 9 - 4 June 2001, № 642)
3. Aleksandr Alekseyev (4 June 2001, № 643 - 9 April 2004, № 516)
4. Aleksey Borodavkin (9 April 2004, № 518 - 26 March 2008, № 412)
5. Anvar Azimov (31 July 2008, № 1156 - 7 June 2011, № 709)
6. Andrey Kelin (7 June 2011, № 710 - 5 August 2015, № 406)
7. Aleksandr Lukashevich (from 5 August 2015, № 407)

== Commonwealth of Independent States ==
The permanent representatives of the Russian Federation to the statutory and other bodies of the Commonwealth of Independent States in Minsk, Belarus

1. Vyacheslav Vorobyev (11 December 1996, № 1662 - 22 July 2003, № 822)
2. Yevgeny Belov (28 July 2003, № 845 — 14 July 2009, № 802)
3. Sergey Kopeiko (14 July 2009, № 803 -?)
4. Igor Gromyko (28 December 2009, № 1508 — 3 February 2014, № 51)
5. Andrey Shvedov (3 February 2014, № 52 — 17 August 2018, № 486)
6. Andrey Grozov (from 17 August 2018, № 487)

== Council of Europe ==
The permanent representatives of the Russian Federation to the Council of Europe in Strasbourg, France

1. Yevgeny Prokhorov (16 December 1996, № 1697 - died 21 May 1998)
2. Andrey Vdovin (13 October 1998, № 1221 - 31 May 2001, № 622)
3. Aleksandr Orlov (31 May 2001, № 623 - 3 January 2007, № 1)
4. Aleksandr Alekseyev (3 January 2007, № 2 — 1 October 2015, № 497)
5. Ivan Soltanovsky (1 October 2015, № 498 — 22 November 2022, № 843)

== NATO ==
The permanent representatives of the Russian Federation to the North Atlantic Treaty Organization (NATO) in Brussels, Belgium (representatives were concurrently appointed ambassador to Belgium between 1990 and 2003)

1. Nikolay Afanasevsky (24 July 1990, № 365 — 3 October 1994, № 1959)
2. Vitaly Churkin (3 October 1994, № 1960 — 25 February 1998, № 198)
3. Sergey Kislyak (25 February 1998, № 199 - 11 March 2003, № 321)
4. Konstantin Totsky (16 May 2003, № 530 - 9 January 2008, № 7)
5. Dmitry Rogozin (9 January 2008, № 8 - 23 December 2011, № 1680)
6. Alexander Grushko (since 23 October 2012, № 1435 — 22 January 2018, № 17)

Representative of the Russian Federation to the High Command Allied Powers in Europe

1. Leonty Shevtsov (1995–1997)
2. Anatoly Krivolapov (1997–1999)
3. Viktor Loginov (1999–2003)

Senior military representative of the Russian Federation to NATO

1. Viktor Zavarzin (1997-2002)
2. Valentin Kuznetsov (2002-2008)
3. Alexey Maslov (2008-2011)
4. Aleksandr Burov (Acting) (2011-2013)
5. Valery Evnevich (2013-2014)
6. Aleksandr Burov (Acting) (from 2014)

== Organisation for the Prohibition of Chemical Weapons ==
Russia's permanent representative to the Organisation for the Prohibition of Chemical Weapons in The Hague, Netherlands (representatives are concurrently appointed ambassador to the Netherlands)

1. Aleksandr Khodakov (17 April 1998, № 408 - 20 August 2003, № 975)
2. Kirill Gevorgian (20 August 2003, № 976 - 5 November 2009, № 1238)
3. Roman Kolodkin (5 November 2009, № 1239 — 15 September 2015, № 462)
4. Aleksandr Shulgin (from 15 September 2015, № 463 — 5 December 2023, № 930)
5. Vladimir Tarabrin (from 5 December 2023, № 931)

== Conference on Disarmament ==
The permanent representatives of the Russian Federation to the Conference on Disarmament in Geneva, the Swiss Confederation (representatives have been concurrently appointed as Permanent Representatives of the Russian Federation to the United Nations Office and other international organizations in Geneva since 1998)

1. Grigory Berdennikov (1993 - 3 February 1998, № 133)
2. Vasily Sidorov (17 April 1998, № 407 - 31 July 2001, № 941)
3. Leonid Skotnikov (31 July 2001, № 942 - 26 December 2005, № 1528)
4. Valery Loshchinin (26 December 2005, № 1529 - 5 December 2011, № 1583)
5. Aleksey Borodavkin (5 December 2011, № 1585 - 31 January 2018, № 34)
6. Gennady Gatilov (from 31 January 2018, № 35)

== Eurasian Economic Community ==
Permanent representative of the Russian Federation to the Eurasian Economic Community

1. Yevgeny Mikhailov (17 July 2002, № 747 — 1 February 2012, № 137)

== Food and Agriculture Organization and the World Food Programme ==
Permanent representative of the Russian Federation to the Food and Agriculture Organization of the United Nations (FAO) and World Food Programme (WFP) (representatives were concurrently appointed ambassador to Italy between 2006 and 2012)

1. Aleksey Meshkov (2 September 2006, № 961 — 14 December 2012, № 1663)
2. Aleksandr Gorban (7 April 2014, № 215 — 6 October 2017)
3. Viktor Vasilyev (24 April 2018, № 173 — 3 October 2023, № 738)
4. Igor Golubovsky (from 3 October 2023, № 739)

== Organisation of Islamic Cooperation ==
Permanent representative of the Russian Federation to the Organisation of Islamic Cooperation (formerly the Organisation of Islamic Conference) in Jeddah, Kingdom of Saudi Arabia (representatives were concurrently appointed ambassador to Saudi Arabia between September 2011 and December 2018)

1. Kamil Iskhakov (14 July 2008, № 1089 — 6 September 2011, № 1165)
2. Oleg Ozerov (6 September 2011, № 1166 — 20 February 2017, № 75)
3. Sergei Kozlov (20 February 2017, № 77 — 20 December 2018, № 738)
4. Ramazan Abdulatipov (20 December 2018, № 739 — 17 July 2023, № 523)
5. Turko Daudov (from 17 July 2023, № 524)

== Collective Security Treaty Organization ==
Plenipotentiaries of the Russian Federation to the Collective Security Treaty Organization

1. Igor Khalevinski (22 February 2004, № 257 - 3 April 2006, № 317)
2. Aleksandr Rannikh (3 April 2006, № 317 - 23 August 2010, № 1050)
3. Igor Lyakin-Frolov (23 August 2010, № 1050 — 11 July 2013, № 623)
4. Viktor Vasilyev (21 October 2013, № 791 — 13 June 2018, № 301)

Permanent Plenipotentiaries of the Russian Federation to the Collective Security Treaty Organization

1. Andrey Shvedov (21 February 2019, № 73 — 21 September 2021, № 537)
2. Mikael Agasandyan (from 21 September 2021, № 538 — 9 April 2024, № 250)
3. Viktor Vasilyev (from 9 April 2024, № 251)

== Arab League ==
Plenipotentiary of the Russian Federation to the League of Arab States in Cairo, Egypt (representatives concurrently appointed as Ambassador to Egypt)

1. Mikhail Bogdanov (18 October 2005, № 1216 - 12 June 2011, № 789)
2. Sergei Kirpichenko (7 September 2011, № 1171 - 2 September 2019)
3. Georgy Borisenko (27 April 2020, № 291)

== African Union ==
Plenipotentiary of the Russian Federation to the African Union in Addis Ababa, Ethiopia (representatives concurrently appointed as Ambassador to Ethiopia)

1. Mikhail Afanasyev (9 November 2006, № 1256 - 29 October 2010, № 1304)
2. Valery Utkin (29 October 2010, № 1305 — 23 June 2014, № 455)
3. Vsevolod Tkachenko (23 June 2014, № 456 — 27 March 2019, № 133)
4. Yevgeny Terekhin (from 27 March 2019, № 134)

== Organization of American States ==
Permanent observers of the Russian Federation to the Organization of American States in Washington, D.C., U.S. (observers have been concurrently appointed Ambassador to the United States between 1992 and 1994, and since 1998)

1. Vladimir Lukin (7 May 1992, Presidential order № 218-p - 8 February 1994, № 255)
2. Vladimir Chernyshyov (7 December 1994, № 2165 - 31 August 1997)
3. Yuri Ushakov (16 December 1998, № 1591 - 31 May 2008, № 866)
4. Sergey Kislyak (26 July 2008, № 1122 — 21 August 2017, № 394)
5. Anatoly Antonov (21 August 2017, № 395 — 10 October 2024, № 862)
6. Aleksandr Kim (10 October 2024 — 6 March 2025) (Chargé d'affaires)
7. Alexander Darchiev (from 6 March 2025, № 121)

== Latin American Integration Association ==
Observers of the Russian Federation to the Committee of representatives of Latin American Integration Association (observers are concurrently appointed Ambassador to Uruguay)

1. Boris Golovin (1 October 1993, № 1520 - 13 April 1999 № 473)
2. Yevgeny Astakhov (9 August 1999, № 1023 - 31 July 2000, № 1404)
3. Yan Burlyai (31 July 2000, № 1405 - 26 September 2005, № 1127)
4. Sergei Koshkin (26 September 2005, № 1128 — 5 November 2013, № 824)
5. Aleksei Labetsky (15 January 2014, № 22 — 10 January 2018, № 10)
6. Nikolai Sofinsky (10 January 2018, № 11 — 5 October 2020, № 598)
7. Andrey Budayev (5 October 2020, № 599 — 22 April 2025, № 258)
8. Aleksey Isakov (from 22 April 2025, № 259)

== Association of Southeast Asian Nations ==
Permanent representatives of the Russian Federation to the Association of Southeast Asian Nations (ASEAN) in Jakarta, Indonesia (representatives were concurrently appointed Ambassador to Indonesia between 2009 and 2017)

1. Aleksandr Ivanov (20 January 2009, № 71 — 11 October 2012, № 1398)
2. Mikhail Galuzin (25 October 2012, № 1438 — 7 August 2017, № 354)
3. Aleksandr Ivanov (7 August 2017, № 355 — 28 March 2023, № 207)
4. Evgeny Zagaynov (from 28 March 2023, № 208)

== World Tourism Organization ==
Permanent representatives of the Russian Federation to the World Tourism Organization in Madrid, Spain (representatives are concurrently appointed Ambassador to Spain)

1. Yury Korchagin (3 February 2014, № 53 — 18 November 2022, № 835)

== World Trade Organization ==
Permanent representatives of the Russian Federation to the World Trade Organization (WTO) in Geneva, Switzerland

1. Gennady Ovechko (17 February 2014, № 83 — 5 December 2019, № 580)
2. Dmitry Lyakishev (5 December 2019, № 581 — 1 March 2024, № 151)
3. Nikolai Platonov (from 1 March 2024, № 152)

== International Seabed Authority ==
Permanent representatives of the Russian Federation to the International Seabed Authority in Kingston, Jamaica (representatives are concurrently appointed Ambassador to Jamaica)

1. Vladimir Vinokurov (14 March 2016, № 121 - 24 May 2021, № 307)
2. Sergei Petrovich (from 24 May 2021, № 314)
