= List of ambassadors of Russia to Tajikistan =

Ambassador of the Russian Federation to the Republic of Tajikistan
- Emblem of the Russian Foreign Ministry
- Incumbent; Semyon Grigoryev since 16 August 2022
- Ministry of Foreign Affairs; Embassy of Russia in Dushanbe
- Style: His Excellency; The Honourable
- Reports to: Minister of Foreign Affairs
- Seat: Dushanbe
- Appointer: President of Russia
- Term length: At the pleasure of the president
- Website: Embassy of Russia in Tajikistan

The ambassador extraordinary and plenipotentiary of the Russian Federation to Tajikistan is the official representative of the president and the government of the Russian Federation to the president and the government of Tajikistan.

The ambassador and his staff work at large in the Embassy of Russia in Dushanbe. There is a consulate general in Khujand. The post of Russian ambassador to Tajikistan is currently held by Semyon Grigoryev, incumbent since 16 August 2022.

== History of diplomatic relations ==
With the dissolution of the Soviet Union in 1991, diplomatic relations between the Russian Federation and the Republic of Tajikistan were first established on 8 April 1992. The first ambassador, Mecheslav Senkevich, was appointed on 18 March 1992.

== Representatives of the Russian Federation to Tajikistan (1992–present) ==
Name	Title	Appointment	Termination	Notes
Mecheslav Senkevich	Ambassador	18 March 1992	3 October 1996	
Yevgeny Belov	Ambassador	3 October 1996	28 April 2000	
Maksim Peshkov	Ambassador	8 June 2000	23 May 2005	
Ramazan Abdulatipov	Ambassador	23 May 2005	6 March 2009	Credentials presented on 24 June 2005
Yury Popov	Ambassador	6 March 2009	1 August 2013	Credentials presented on 14 May 2009
Igor Lyakin-Frolov	Ambassador	1 August 2013	16 August 2022	Credentials presented on 5 October 2013
Semyon Grigoryev	Ambassador	16 August 2022		Credentials presented on 21 November 2022
