= UN Global Counter-Terrorism Strategy =

The UN Global Counter-Terrorism Strategy (UNGCTS) was adopted by the United Nations General Assembly on 8 September 2006. It is reviewed by the General Assembly every two years.

== In the news ==
- On 22 February 2017, newly-installed Secretary-General António Guterres declared that a new Office of Counter-Terrorism would soon be formed with gender-balanced staff in order "to review the capability of the UN system to assist Member States, upon their request, in implementing the GCTS in a balanced manner". He said that "terrorism cannot and should not be associated with any nationality, culture, religion or ethnic group." The new office will have a new official, who "will be appointed by the Secretary-General with the consent of the 193-nation body because it's a General Assembly mandate," said a press officer.
- The G7 meeting at Taormina in late May 2017 produced as one of its efforts a statement on the Manchester Arena bombing, which occurred scant days before. Point nine of 15 mentioned the resolve of the participants to reinforce cooperation among themselves and intensify their partnership. They would continue to support the GTCS.
