= Mikhail Ivanovich Ulyanov =

Russian diplomat

Mikhail Ulyanov
- Михаил Ульянов
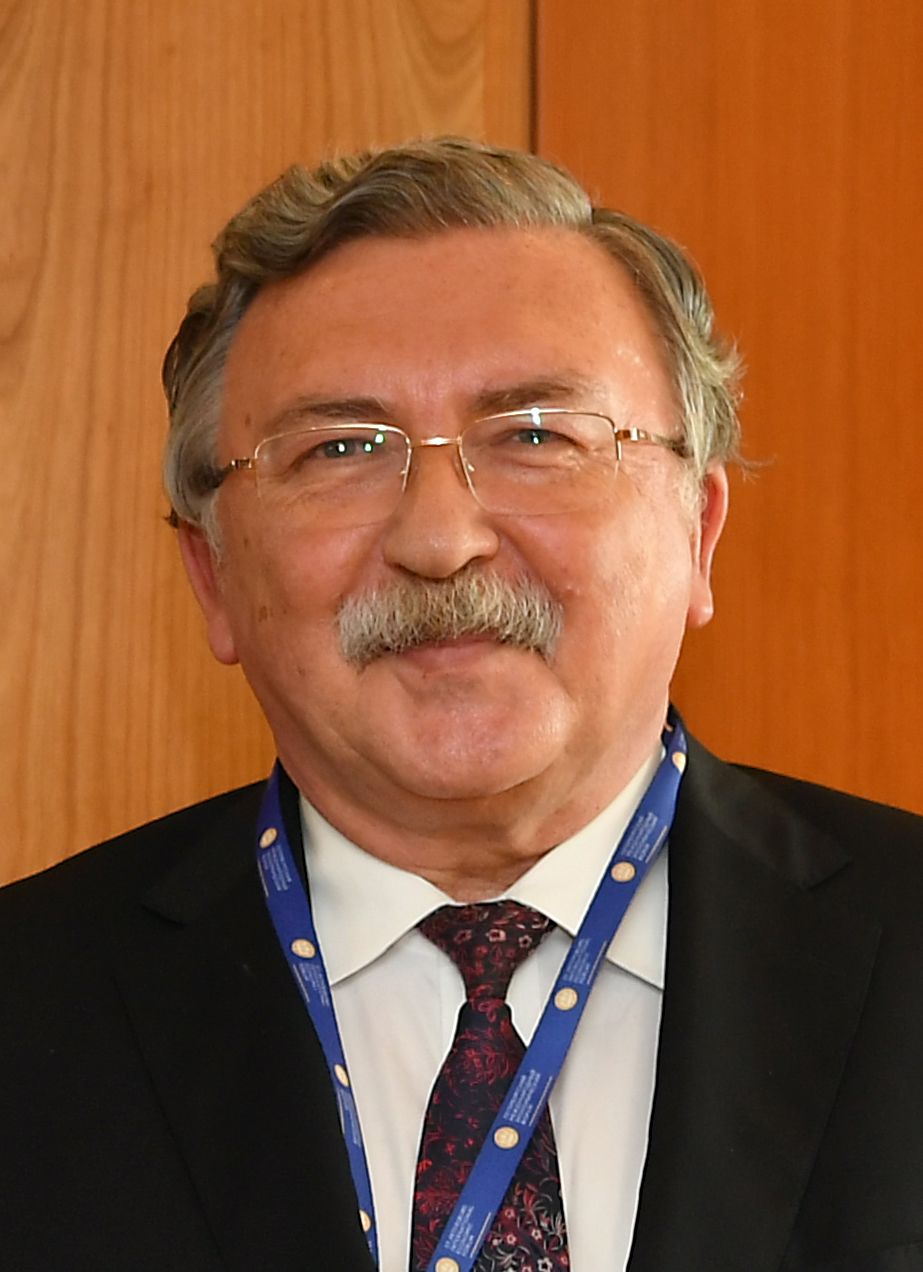
- Ulyanov in 2020

Russia's Permanent Representative to International Organizations in Vienna
- Incumbent
- Assumed office 23 January 2018
- President: Vladimir Putin
- Preceded by: Vladimir Ivanovich Voronkov

Personal details
- Born: Mikhail Ivanovich Ulyanov; Михаил Иванович Ульянов; 23 August 1958 (age 68) Moscow, Soviet Union
- Children: 1
- Awards: Order of Friendship (2012)

Mikhail Ivanovich Ulyanov (Russian: Михаил Иванович Ульянов; born 23 August 1953) is a Russian foreign service officer who since 2018 has served as Russia's Permanent Representative to International Organizations in Vienna.

== Biography ==
Mikhail Ulyanov graduated from the Moscow State Institute of History and Archives (MGIAI) in 1980.

From January 2004 to September 2006 he was a Deputy Director of the Department for Security and Disarmament Affairs of the Russian Foreign Ministry.

Since September 2006, he has been the head of the Russian delegation at the Vienna talks on military security and arms control.

From 2011 till 2014, he was Director of the Department for Security and Disarmament Affairs of the Russian Foreign Ministry.

From 2014 till 2017, he was Director of the Department for Non-Proliferation and Arms Control of the Russian Foreign Ministry.

Since 23 January 2018 he served as Russia's Permanent Representative to international organizations in Vienna (Austria).

=== During the Russian war against Ukraine ===
On 12 August 2022, he declared that anti-Russian sanctions had completely failed. On August 20, 2022, in response to the publication of the President of Ukraine Volodymyr Zelenskyy about the US armed assistance to Ukraine, Ulyanov wrote on the official Twitter channel: "No mercy for the Ukrainian population!" He subsequently deleted his post, apologizing and saying: "I forgot who I'm dealing with". Analyst Olga Lautman commented on the removal: "The Chekist war criminal apologized for admitting that Russian military targets are Ukrainians. This part was to be kept secret." Mykhailo Podolyak, adviser to the head of the President's Office in Ukraine, noted that the call for genocide of the Ukrainian people is unacceptable. Ulyanov called attempts to accuse him of calling for the genocide of the Ukrainian people outrageous, claiming his words "No mercy for the Ukrainian population" meant that the US supposedly does not have mercy for Ukrainians due to its armed assistance, not that he doesn't want mercy for Ukrainians.

=== Interactions with NAFO ===
On June 19, 2022 Ulyanov responded on Twitter to a member of the pro-Ukrainian online movement NAFO, saying: "You pronounced this nonsense. Not me." Other members of NAFO then proceeded to mock Ulyanov for this comment, with it rapidly becoming a meme as well as the first NAFO motto. Ulyanov later took a temporary break from Twitter.
