= Vladimir Titov (diplomat) =

Russian diplomat (1958–2025)

- Владимир Титов
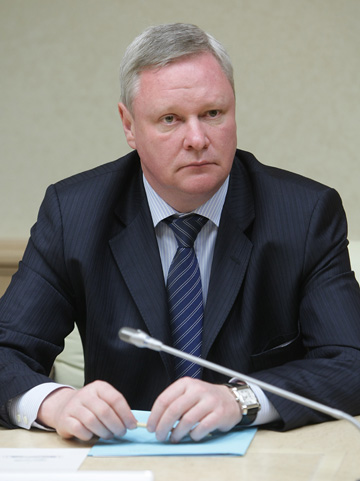
- Titov in 2010

First Deputy Minister of Foreign Affairs
- In office 22 April 2013 – 29 July 2024
- Preceded by: Andrey Denisov
- Succeeded by: Sergei Butin

Deputy Minister of Foreign Affairs
- In office 19 October 2005 – 22 April 2013

Russian Ambassador to Bulgaria
- In office 31 December 1999 – 25 May 2004
- Preceded by: Leonid Kerestedzhyants
- Succeeded by: Anatoly Potapov

Personal details
- Born: 4 April 1964 Moscow, Soviet Union
- Died: 6 February 2025 Moscow, Russia
- Education: MGIMO

Vladimir Gennadievich Titov (Russian: Владимир Геннадиевич Титов; 28 July 1958 – February 6, 2025) was a Russian diplomat who served as First Deputy Minister of Foreign Affairs of the Russian Federation from April 22, 2013 to July 29, 2024. He held the title Ambassador Extraordinary and Plenipotentiary since 2004.

== Biography ==
He was born on July 28, 1958 in Moscow. He graduated from MGIMO in 1980. In addition to Russian, he spoke English and Swedish.

He has been with the Ministry of Foreign Affairs since 1980. In 1991-1997 he served as Minister-Counselor of the Russian Embassy in Sweden. In 1997-1999 he served as director of the Second European Department of the Russian Ministry of Foreign Affairs. In 1999-2004 he served as Ambassador Extraordinary and Plenipotentiary of the Russian Federation to Bulgaria. In 2004-2005 he served as Director of the Personnel Department, Member of the Board of the Russian Ministry of Foreign Affairs. From October 19, 2005 to April 22, 2013 he served as Deputy Minister of Foreign Affairs of Russia. In 2009-2012 he was a member of the Presidential Commission to Counter Attempts to Falsify History to the Detriment of Russia's Interests. From April 22, 2013 to July 29, 2024 he served as First Deputy Minister of Foreign Affairs of the Russian Federation. As Deputy Minister, he oversaw relations with European countries and administrative issues. He died on February 6, 2025 at the age of 66.

== Awards ==
- Order of Stara Planina, 1st class (April 16, 2004, Bulgaria);
- Order of Honour (July 3, 2008) — for great contribution to the implementation of the foreign policy of the Russian Federation and many years of conscientious work.
- Russian Federation Presidential Certificate of Honour (June 12, 2011) — for great contribution to the implementation of the foreign policy of the Russian Federation and many years of conscientious work.
- Order "For Merit to the Fatherland", 4th class (May 2, 2014) — for achieved labor successes, significant contribution to the socio-economic development of the Russian Federation, implementation of the foreign policy of the Russian Federation, services in the humanitarian sphere, strengthening the rule of law and order, active public work, many years of conscientious work.
- Order "For Merit to the Fatherland", 3rd class (July 16, 2018) - for a major contribution to the implementation of the foreign policy of the Russian Federation.
- Order of Alexander Nevsky (July 10, 2023) - for a major contribution to the implementation of the foreign policy of the Russian Federation and many years of conscientious diplomatic service.
