= Sergei Butin =

Russian diplomat (born 1964)

- Сергей Бутин

First Deputy Minister of Foreign Affairs
- Incumbent
- Assumed office 17 August 2024
- Preceded by: Vladimir Titov

Deputy Minister of Foreign Affairs
- In office 22 May 2023 – 17 August 2024

Personal details
- Born: 4 April 1964 (age 62)
- Education: Moscow State University

Sergei Vladimirovich Butin (Russian: Сергей Владимирович Бутин; born April 4, 1964) is a Russian diplomat. Ambassador Extraordinary and Plenipotentiary (2020) and serving as First Deputy Minister of Foreign Affairs of the Russian Federation since August 17, 2024.

== Biography ==
He graduated from the Institute of Asian and African Countries at Moscow State University (1987). Has been in diplomatic service since 1996. Speaks Japanese and English.

In 1998-2004 he served as Vice-Consul of the Russian Federation in Niigata, Japan. In 2007-2010 he was the head of Department in the General Secretariat (Department) of the Russian Foreign Ministry. In 2010-2011 he served as Consul General of the Russian Federation in Niigata, Japan. In 2011-2013 he served as Minister-Counselor of the Russian Embassy in Japan. In 2013-2017 he served as Deputy Director of the General Secretariat (Department), Head of the Secretariat of the Minister of Foreign Affairs. In 2017-2023 he served as Director of the General Secretariat (Department), Head of the Secretariat of the Minister of Foreign Affairs. From May 22, 2023 to August 17, 2024 he served as Deputy Minister and Chief of Staff of the Minister of Foreign Affairs of the Russian Federation. From August 17, 2024 - First Deputy Minister of Foreign Affairs of the Russian Federation.

== Awards ==
- Order of Alexander Nevsky (12 May 2023) — For great contribution to the implementation of the foreign policy of the Russian Federation and many years of conscientious diplomatic service.
- Order of Friendship (30 May 2018) — For great contribution to the implementation of the foreign policy of the Russian Federation and many years of conscientious work.
- Medal of the Order "For Merit to the Fatherland" 2nd class (10 February 2012) — For courage and high professionalism demonstrated in the performance of official duty in an emergency situation in Japan.
- Russian Federation Presidential Certificate of Honour (1 April 2024) — for services in the implementation of the foreign policy of the Russian Federation.
- Honorary Worker of the Ministry of Foreign Affairs of Russia.
