= Alexander Grushko =

Russian diplomat

- Александр Грушко
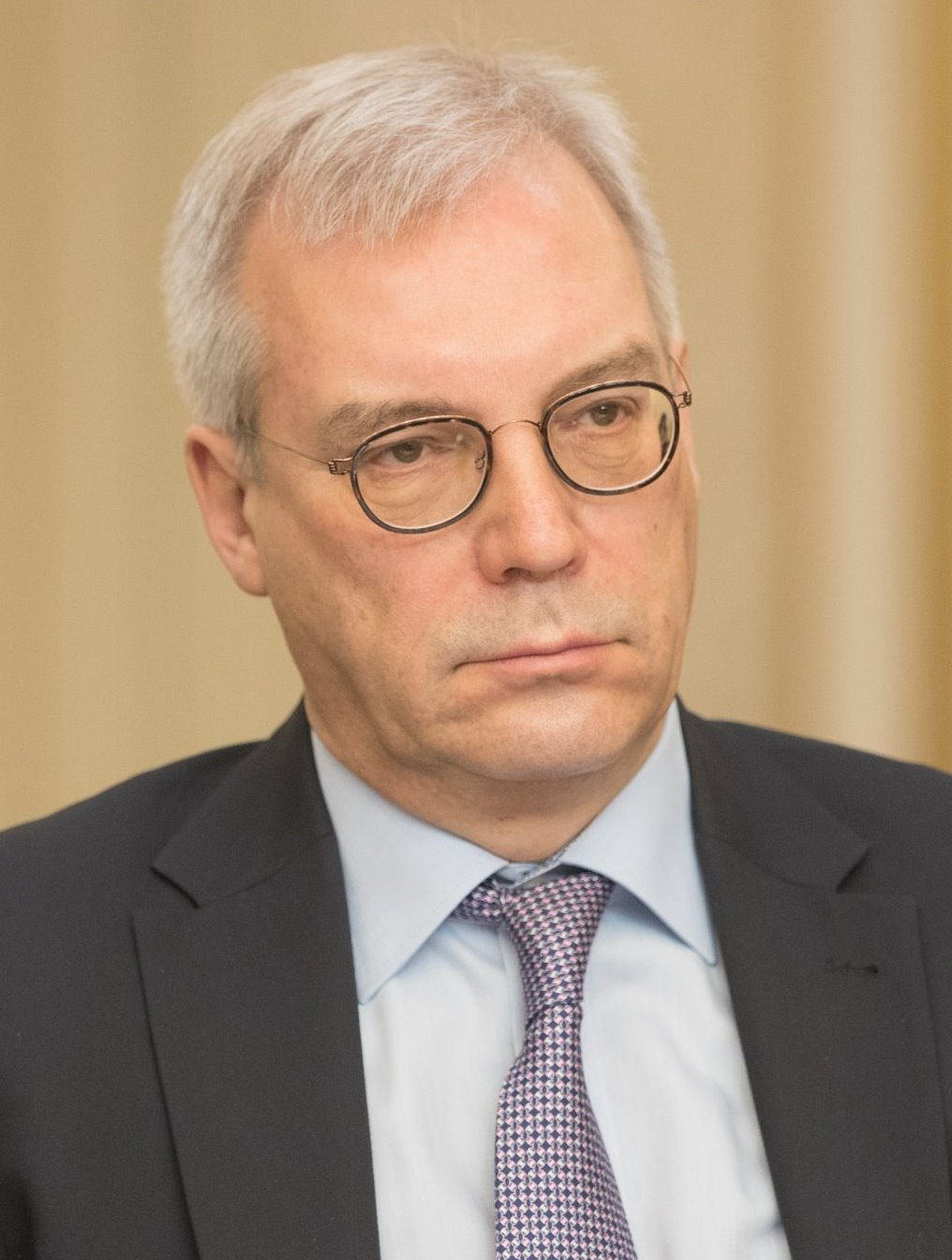
- Grushko in 2018

Deputy Minister of Foreign Affairs
- Incumbent
- Assumed office 22 January 2018
- In office 6 September 2005 – 23 October 2012
- Minister: Sergey Lavrov

Russian Envoy to NATO
- In office 23 October 2012 – 22 January 2018
- President: Vladimir Putin
- Preceded by: Dmitry Rogozin
- Succeeded by: Vacant

Personal details
- Born: Alexander Viktorovich Grushko; 25 April 1955 (age 71) Moscow, Soviet Union
- Education: Moscow State Institute of International Relations
- Occupation: Diplomat

Alexander Viktorovich Grushko (Russian: Александр Викторович Грушко; born 25 April 1955) is a Russian diplomat, and is currently Deputy Minister of Foreign Affairs, since 22 January 2018. Previously, he was the Permanent Representative of Russia to NATO, serving from 2012 to 2018.

== Biography ==
Born in the family of Viktor Grushko (1930–2001) — a Soviet spy, former First Deputy Chairman of the KGB.

In 1977 he graduated from the Moscow State Institute of International Relations. In the same year he entered the diplomatic service.

From 1995 to 1996 he was head of the Department of Security And Disarmament Affairs at the Russian Foreign Ministry.

From 1996 to 2000 he was head of the Russian delegation for military security and arms control in Vienna.

From 2000 to 2001 he was Deputy Director of the pan-European cooperation Department of the Russian Foreign Ministry.

From 2002 to 2005 he was Director of the Department of pan-European cooperation of the Russian Foreign Ministry.

From 2005 to 2012 he was Deputy Minister of Foreign Affairs of Russia.

From 23 October 2012 to 22 January 2018 he was Permanent Representative of Russia to NATO in Brussels.

On 22 January 2018, he was re-appointed as Deputy Minister of Foreign Affairs of Russia.

== Personal life ==
Alexander Grushko is married, has a son and a daughter. Since 2004 he has the rank of Ambassador Extraordinary and Plenipotentiary.

Grushko speaks Russian, English and Dutch.

== Honors and awards ==
- Medal of the Order "For Merit to the Fatherland", 2nd class (1996);
- Order of Friendship (2000);
- Gratitude to the Central Election Commission (2008);
- Order of Honour (2012);
- Presidential Certificate of Honour (2015).

Diplomatic posts
Preceded by Dmitry Rogozin	Russian Envoy to NATO; 2012–2018	Succeeded by None
