= Semyon Grigoryev =

Russian diplomat

Semyon Vyacheslavovich Grigoriyev (Russian: Семён Вячеславович Григорьев; born 1960), is a Russian diplomat and was the first Russian ambassador to Abkhazia, serving between 2008 and 2018. He has served as ambassador to Tajikistan since 2022.

== Career ==
Grigoriyev graduated from the Moscow State Institute of International Relations in 1983, and went on to work at the Ministry of Foreign Affairs in a position at the Soviet embassy in Kabul, Afghanistan.

From 1990 – 1997 he was third, second and first secretary at the Soviet and Russian embassies in Tehran, Iran.

From 2003 – 2006, he was deputy director of the Fourth Department of the CIS Countries at the Russian foreign ministry, and from 2006 – 2008, he was an adviser-envoy at the Embassy of Russia in Kabul.

From February 2008, he was again deputy director of the Fourth Department of the CIS Countries, specialising in issues relating to Abkhazia and South Ossetia. On 25 October 2008, Russian president Dmitry Medvedev appointed Grigoriyev as the first ambassador of Russia to Abkhazia, after Russia recognised Abkhazian and South Ossetian independence following the war in August 2008. Grigoriyev presented his Letters of Credence to President of Abkhazia, Sergey Bagapsh on 16 December 2008.

Grigoriyev speaks Russian, English, Dari and Pashtu.
