= Vladimir Ivanovich Voronkov =

Russian diplomat

Vladimir Voronkov
- Владимир Воронков
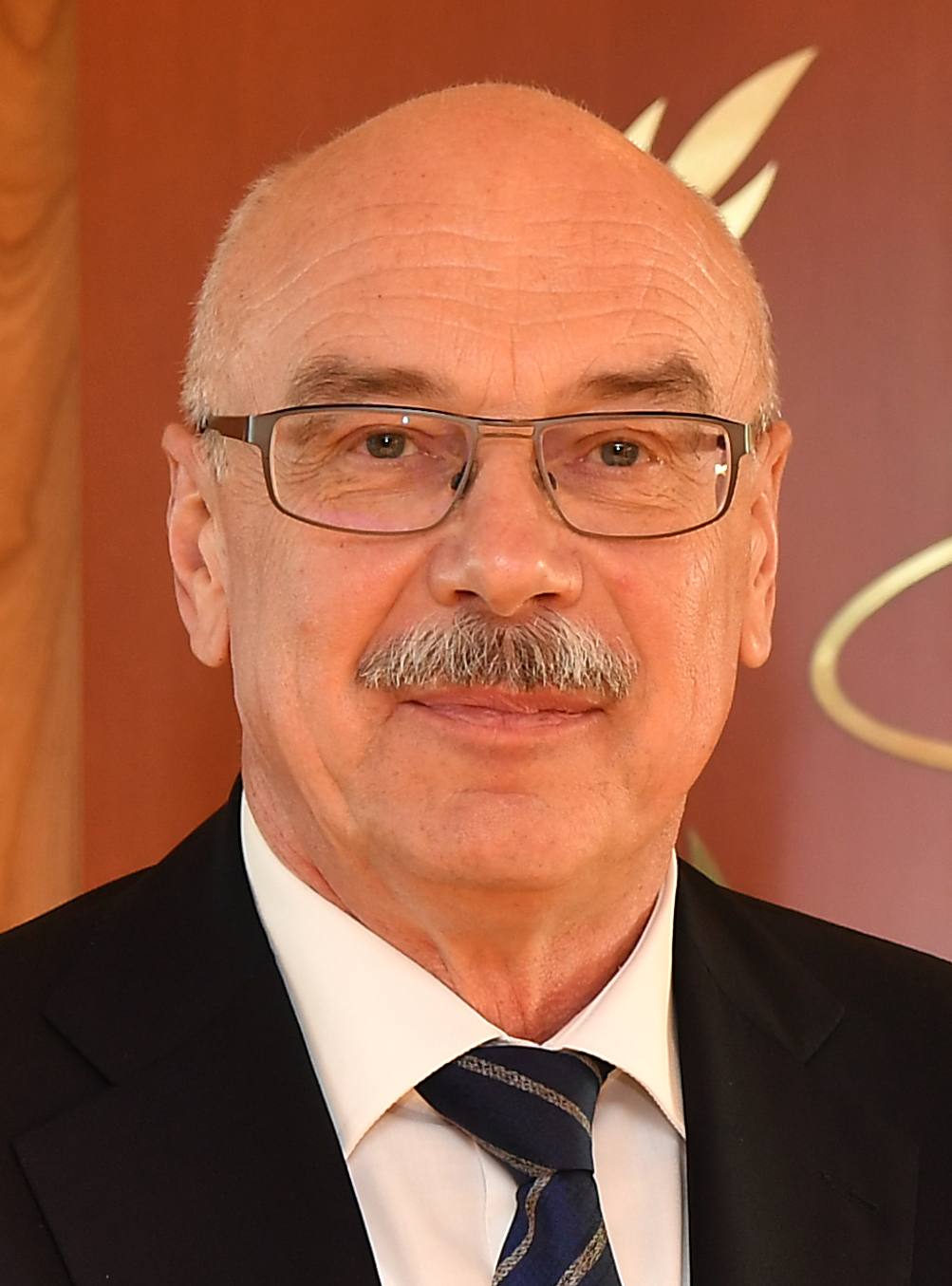
- Voronkov in 2020

1st Under-Secretary for the United Nations Counter-Terrorism Office
- Incumbent
- Assumed office TBA

Russia's Permanent Representative to International Organizations in Vienna
- In office 26 July 2011 – 7 August 2017
- President: Vladimir Putin
- Preceded by: Alexander Zmeyevsky
- Succeeded by: Mikhail Ivanovich Ulyanov

Personal details
- Born: Vladimir Ivanovich Voronkov; Владимир Иванович Воронков; 23 June 1953 (age 73) Moscow, Soviet Union
- Education: Moscow State University (1975)
- Awards: Order of Friendship (2013)

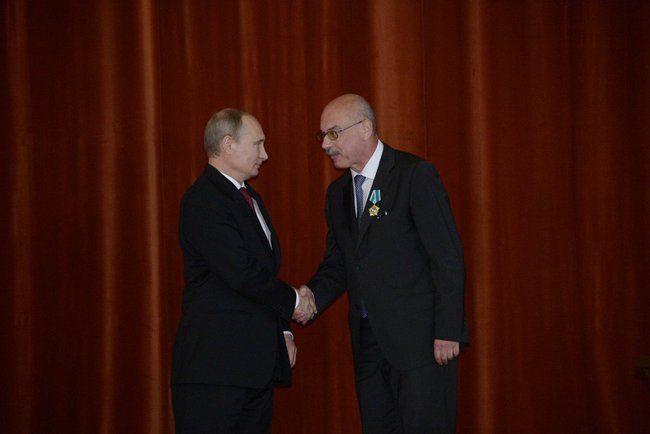
Voronkov receives the Order of Friendship from Vladimir Putin in 2014.

Vladimir Ivanovich Voronkov (Russian: Влади́мир Ива́нович Воронко́в; born 21 June 1953) is a Russian foreign service officer who, since 2011, has served as Russia's Permanent Representative to International Organizations in Vienna. In June 2017, the United Nations named Voronkov as the first Under-Secretary-General for the new United Nations Office of Counter-Terrorism (UNOCT).

== Early life and education ==
Voronkov was born in Moscow, the son of two history professors. His father, Ivan Alexandrovich Voronkov (1921–1983), was a department head at Moscow State University (MSU), and his mother taught at the Institute of Asian and African Studies at MSU. Vladimir Voronkov earned bachelor's, master's, and doctoral degrees in history at MSU. In 1974–1975 and 1977–1978, he studied at the University of Warsaw. His thesis concerned the Polish Peasant Party in 1918–1922. He is fluent in English and Polish.

== Career ==
After earning his doctorate, Voronkov joined the Institute of Economics at the Soviet Academy of Sciences and became a Polish interpreter for the Central Committee, interpreting for Central Party Chairmen Leonid Brezhnev and Konstantin Chernenko.

Voronkov joined the Soviet Ministry of Foreign Affairs in 1989 and, until 1994, worked as a press attaché in Poland at the Soviet and then Russian Embassy. Since 1994, he has held various positions with the Foreign Ministry in Moscow, Poland, and Vienna. From 2008 to 2011, he served as Director of the Department of European Cooperation at the Ministry. In 2011, he was appointed Permanent Representative of the Russian Federation to the UN and other International Organizations in Vienna.

In June 2017, UN Secretary-General António Guterres appointed Voronkov to serve as the first Under-Secretary-General of the UN Counter-Terrorism Office, which was created on 15 June 2017. It was predicted a Russian would get the position, as Russia was the only country favored to receive the post, being the only permanent member of the UN Security Council that did not have one of its nationals holding a major UN position.

== Personal life ==
Voronkov is married to Irina Pavlovna Voronkova (née Fomicheva) and has a daughter, Daria.

In 2002, he was made a Knight of the Order of Merit of Poland.

== Diplomatic ranks ==
- Envoy Extraordinary and Plenipotentiary Class 2 (15 January 2002)
- Envoy Extraordinary and Plenipotentiary Class 1 (25 May 2006)
- Ambassador Extraordinary and Plenipotentiary (17 January 2011)
