= Leonid Skotnikov =

Russian judge (born 1951)

Leonid Skotnikov (Леони́д Скотников; born 26 March 1951) is a Russian judge who served on the United Nations International Court of Justice in The Hague, Netherlands between 2006 and 2015.

== Biography ==
Leonid Skotnikov graduated from MGIMO USSR Ministry of Foreign Affairs in 1974. He speaks English and French.

The main part of his career worked in the legal service of Ministries of Foreign Affairs of the USSR and the Russian Federation.

- In 1991-1992 - Director of the Legal Department of the Russian Foreign Ministry.
- From March 18, 1992 to April 17, 1998 - Ambassador Extraordinary and Plenipotentiary of the Russian Federation to Netherlands.
- In 1998-2001 - Director of the Legal Department Ministry of Foreign Affairs of Russia, member of the Board of the Ministry of Foreign Affairs of Russia.
- From July 31, 2001 to December 26, 2005 - permanent representative of Russia at the UN office and other international organizations in Geneva.
- From 6 February 2006 to 6 February 2015 - Member of the International Court of Justice.
- Currently serving as an ad hoc judge in two cases before the International Court of Justice.

== Education ==
Skotnikov attained a diploma in international law from the Moscow Institute of International Relations in 1974. In 1990 received a fellowship at the Center for International Affairs, Harvard University.

== Publications ==
- The Right of Self-Defence and the New Security Imperatives, In: International Affairs Vol. 9, 2004;
- Legal Limits of the Use of Force, In: International Affairs Vol. 11, 2003;
- Entering the XXI Century: Primacy of Law in International Relations In: International Affairs Vol. 12, 2000;
- Primacy of Law in Politics (Miverfasser), In: International Affairs Vol. 4, 1989.
