= United Nations Office of Counter-Terrorism =

Office of the United Nations Secretariat in Charge of Counter-Terrorism

- Abbreviation: UNOCT
- Formation: 15 June 2017
- Type: Secretariat office
- Legal status: Active
- Headquarters: Headquarters of the United Nations, New York City, New York, United States
- Head: Under-Secretary-General for Counter-Terrorism Vladimir Ivanovich Voronkov
- Website: un.org/counterterrorism/

The United Nations Office of Counter-Terrorism (UNOCT) is an office of the United Nations Secretariat that is responsible for promoting international cooperation in counterterrorism efforts, examining the causes and effects of terrorism and violent extremism, and organizing efforts to prevent terrorism and extremism. It was established in 2017 in a resolution approved by the UN General Assembly. Vladimir Ivanovich Voronkov is the current Under-Secretary-General of the UNOCT, appointed on 21 June 2017.

Under the UNOCT are the UN Counter-Terrorism Implementation Task Force (CTITF) and the UN Counter-Terrorism Centre (UNCCT).

== History ==
The UNOCT was approved in a UN General Assembly resolution on 15 June 2017 as part of an initiative by Secretary-General António Guterres to transfer counterterrorism functions out of the Department of Political and Peacebuilding Affairs (DPPA).

== Structure ==
The UNOCT is divided into various divisions and units including:

- Under Secretary General (USG)
  - Chief of the Office of the Under-Secretary-General for Counter-Terrorism (OUSG)
    - Front Office
      - Communications Unit
    - Resource Mobilization and Donor Relations Section
    - Evaluation and Compliance Unit
  - Field Coordination Section
    - UNOCT Programme Offices
      - Baghdad: PRR
      - Budapest: CT Travel, TAM, Cyber, CFT
      - Doha: Int’l Hub on BI to CT
      - Doha: Parliamentary Engagement
      - Madrid: VT, Sports, VoT, Weapons
      - Nairobi: PCVE
      - Rabat: CT Training in Africa, CT Investigations, Fusion Cells
  - Deputy to the Under Secretary General and Director (DUSG)
    - CTED Liaison Section
      - EU-UN Global Terrorism Threats Facility
    - Director of the United Nations Counter-Terrorism Centre (UNCCT)
      - Deputy Director of the UNCCT
        - Programme Management Unit (PMU)
        - Strategic Coordination Section
          - Prosecution, Rehabilitation and Reintegration Unit (PRR)
        - Preventing & Countering Violent Extremism Section (PCVE)
          - Asia-Pacific Unit
          - PCVE Unit
          - Victims of Terrorism Unit (VOT)
        - Countering Terrorism Section
          - Border Security and Management Unit (BSM)
          - Countering the Financing of Terrorism Unit (CFT)
          - Cybersecurity & New Technologies Unit
          - Europe & Central Asia Unit
          - Middle East & North Africa Unit (MENA)
          - Countering Terrorist Use of Weapons Unit
    - Chief of the Special Projects and Innovation Branch (SPIB)
      - Countering Terrorist Travel Section (CTT)
        - CT Travel Unit
        - goTravel ICT Unit
        - Threat Assessment Models Unit (TAM)
      - External Partnerships Section (EPS)
      - Special Projects Section
        - Law Enforcement Unit (Fusion Cells, CT Investigations, Autonomous & Remotely Operated Systems)
        - Parliamentary Engagement Unit
        - Sports Unit
        - Surge Capacity Unit
        - Vulnerable Targets Unit (VT)
    - Chief of the Policy, Knowledge Management and Coordination Branch (PKMCB)
      - International Hub on Behavioral Insights (BI Hub)
      - Counter Terrorism Compact Unit
      - Knowledge Management & Strategic Support Section (KMSSS)
        - Knowledge Management Unit
        - Strategic Support Unit
      - Regional Conferences Section (RCS)
      - Regional Support Section (RSS)
        - Americas & CARICOM Unit
        - Asia-Pacific Unit
        - Central Asia and non-EU countries Unit
        - East, Central & Southern Africa Unit
        - European Union (EU countries and entities) Unit
        - MENA Unit
        - South Asia Unit
        - West Africa Unit
    - HRGS Human Rights and Gender Section (HRGS)
      - Human Rights Unit
      - Gender Unit
    - Strategic Planning & Programme Support Section (SPPSS)

== See also ==
- United Nations Office on Drugs and Crime
