= Ministry of Foreign Affairs (Russia) =

Executive ministry of the Russian government

Ministry of Foreign Affairs of the Russian Federation
- Министерство иностранных дел Российской Федерации; Ministerstvo inostrannykh del Rossiiskoi Federatsii
- Ministry flag

- Ministry emblem

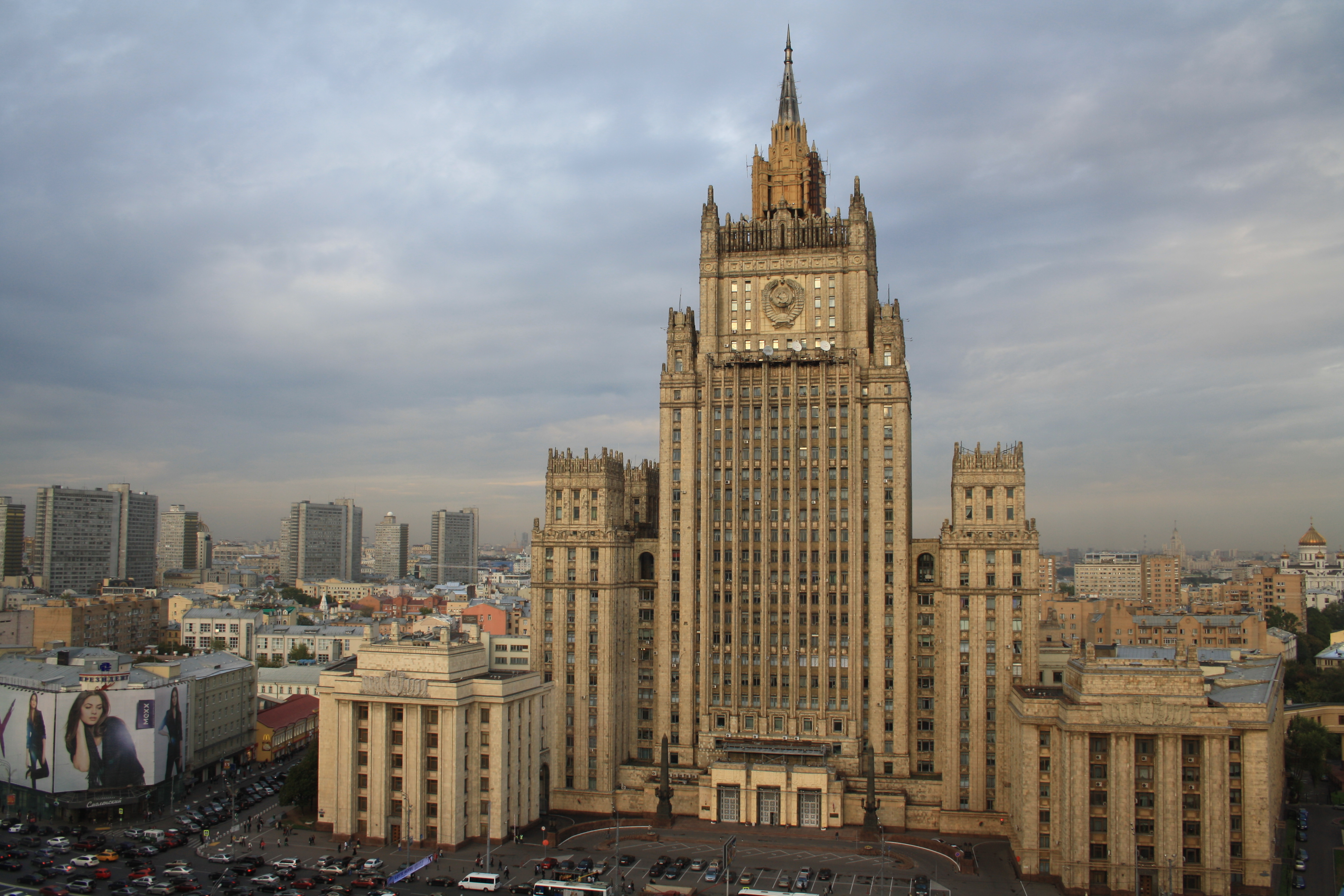
- Ministry of Foreign Affairs main building

Agency overview
- Formed: 1549; 477 years ago (original); 25 December 1991; 34 years ago (current form)
- Preceding agencies: Collegium of Foreign Affairs; Ministry of External Relations (1991)
- Jurisdiction: President of Russia
- Headquarters: 32/34 Smolenskaya-Sennaya Square, Moscow; 55°44′46″N 37°35′3″E
- Minister responsible: Sergei Lavrov, Minister of Foreign Affairs
- Deputy Ministers responsible: Sergei Butin, First Deputy Minister; Georgy Borisenko; Yevgeny Ivanov; Aleksandr Pankin; Alexander Grushko; Sergei Vershinin; Andrei Rudenko
- Agency executives: Alexey Ostrovsky, Director-General; Yevgeny Ivanov, State Secretary
- Child agency: Federal Agency for the Commonwealth of Independent States Affairs, Compatriots Living Abroad, and International Humanitarian Cooperation
- Website: www.mid.ru

The Ministry of Foreign Affairs of the Russian Federation (MFA Russia; Russian: Министерство иностранных дел Российской Федерации, МИД России, romanized: Ministerstvo inostrannykh del Rossiiskoi Federatsii. MID Rossii) is the central government institution charged with leading the foreign policy and foreign relations of Russia.

It is a continuation of the Ministry of Foreign Affairs of the Russian Soviet Federative Socialist Republic, which was under the supervision of the Soviet Ministry of External Relations. Sergei Lavrov is the current foreign minister.

== Structure ==
The structure of the Russian MFA central office includes divisions, which are referred to as departments. Departments are divided into sections. Russian MFA Departments are headed by Directors and their sections by Heads. According to Presidential Decree 1163 of 11 September 2007, the Ministry is divided into 39 departments. Departments are divided into territorial (relations between Russia and foreign countries, grouped according to conventional regions) and functional (according to assigned functions). Each department employs 30-60 diplomats.

In addition, there are four divisions under the Ministry of Foreign Affairs of Russia: the Main Production and Commercial Department for servicing the diplomatic staff under the Ministry of Foreign Affairs of Russia, the Diplomatic Academy of the Ministry of Foreign Affairs of Russia, the Moscow State Institute of International Relations, the Foreign Ministry College and the Russian Center for International Scientific and Cultural Cooperation.

Outside the departmental structure, there are Ambassadors for special assignments, each responsible for a particular issue of international relations (for example, the Georgian-Abkhaz settlement). The ambassadors for special assignments report directly to the deputy ministers.

== Functioning ==
The Ministry of Foreign Affairs is a federal executive authority responsible for the development and implementation of state policy and normative-legal regulation in the field of international relations of the Russian Federation

The President of the Russian Federation is the head of the Foreign Ministry.

The main function of the ministry is to develop an overall foreign policy strategy, submit relevant proposals to the President and implement the foreign policy course.

The Ministry of Foreign Affairs operates directly and through diplomatic representations and consular offices of the Russian Federation, representations of the Russian Federation to international organisations, and territorial offices of the Russian Ministry of Foreign Affairs on the territory of Russia. The MFA system includes the central office; foreign institutions; territorial offices; organisations subordinate to the MFA of Russia, which ensures its work on Russian territory. The Ministry of Foreign Affairs is guided by the Constitution, federal constitutional laws, federal laws, acts of the President and the Government, and international treaties.

The Ministry of Foreign Affairs is headed by the Minister of Foreign Affairs, who is appointed to the post by the President on the proposal of the Prime Minister. The Minister is personally responsible for the implementation of the powers entrusted to the Ministry of Foreign Affairs and the implementation of state policy in the relevant area of work. The Minister has deputies, also appointed by the President.

=== Minister of Foreign Affairs ===
The Minister of Foreign Affairs is the head of the Foreign Ministry. The Minister represents Russia in bilateral and multilateral negotiations and signs international treaties; divides responsibilities between his deputies and the Director-General; approves regulations for the structural subdivisions of the central apparatus; and appoints senior officials from the central apparatus, foreign agencies and territorial bodies.

=== Russia's Permanent Mission to the United Nations ===
The Permanent Mission of Russia to the United Nations is one of the most important foreign offices of the Ministry of Foreign Affairs. The Permanent Mission conducts negotiations on behalf of the Russian Federation on the most important problems of international relations. The Representative Office is headed by the Permanent Representative appointed by the President on the proposal of the Minister for Foreign Affairs. The Permanent Representative represents Russia in all UN structures, including meetings of the Security Council. In special cases, the Minister for Foreign Affairs himself may take his place.

In terms of the number of staff, the Russian mission is one of the largest at the UN. There is even a secondary school with a study of English.

== Overseas schools ==
The ministry operates a network of overseas schools for children of Russian diplomats.

== First Deputy Foreign Ministers of the Russian Federation ==
Name	Date
Fyodor Shelov-Kovedyayev	1991 October 19 – 1992 October 16
Pyotr Aven	1991 November 11 – 1992 February 22
Anatoly Adamishin	1992 October 16 – 1994 November 14
Igor Ivanov	1993 December 30 – 1998 September 24
Boris Pastukhov	1996 February 3 – 1998 September 25
Aleksandr Avdeyev	1998 October 30 – 2002 February 21
Vyacheslav Trubnikov	2000 June 28 – 2004 July 29
Valery Loshchinin	2002 February 22 – 2005 December 26
Eleonora Mitrofanova	2003 May 21 – 2004 August 13
Andrei Denisov	2006 April 8 – 2013 April 22
Vladimir Titov	2013 April 22 – 2024 August 2

=== Current First Deputy Foreign Minister ===
- Sergei Butin (since 17 August 2024)

== Deputy Foreign Ministers of the Russian Federation ==
Name	Date
Boris Kolokolov	1981 April 24 – 1996 February 21
Georgy Kunadze	1991 March 20 – 1993 December 30
Andrey Kolosovsky	1991 June 18 – 1993 September 16
Georgy Mamedov	1991 December 26 – 2003 June 5
Boris Pastukhov	1992 February 22 – 1996 February 3
Sergei Lavrov	1992 April 3 – 1994 November 3
Vitaly Churkin	1992 June 4 – 1994 November 11
Sergey Krylov	1993 October 8 – 1996 December 20
Aleksandr Panov	1993 December 30 – 1996 October 15
Albert Chernyshyov	1993 December 30 –1996 June 13
Nikolay Afanasevsky	1994 November 3 – 1999 January 6
Viktor Posuvalyuk	1994 November 14 – 1999 August 1
Yury Dubinin	1994 December 20 – 1996 June 13
Vasily Sidorov	1995 November 9 – 1998 January 28
Yuri Zubakov	1996 February 3 – 1998 September 14
Ivan Kuznetsov	1996 February 26 – 1997 April 14
Grigory Karasin	1996 July 27 – 2000 March 25
Aleksandr Avdeyev	1996 December 20 – 1998 October 30
Ivan Sergeyev	1997 April 14 – 2001 November 17
Yury Ushakov	1998 January 28 – 1999 March 2
Yury Proshin	1998 May 25 – 1999 August 2
Vasily Sredin	1998 October 30 – 2001 October 17
Leonid Drachevsky	1998 November 16 – 1999 May 25
Yevgeny Gusarov	1999 January 6 – 2002 October 7
Sergei Ordzhonikidze	1999 March 2– 2002 February 26
Ivan Ivanov	1999 July 6 – 2001 September 13
Grigory Berdennikov	1999 October 18 – 2001 April 2; 1992 March 27 –1993 September 16
Viktor Kalyuzhny	2000 May 31 – 2004 July 29
Aleksey Fedotov	2000 July 7 – 2004 March 11
Valery Loshchinin	2001 April 7 – 2002 February 22
Anatoly Safonov	2001 October 4 – 2004 August 13
Aleksandr Saltanov	2001 October 17 – 2011 May 5
Andrey Denisov	2001 December 28 – 2004 July 12
Anatoly Potapov	2002 January 14 – 2004 February 17
Sergey Razov	2002 March 18 – 2005 June 10
Yury Fedotov	2002 June 7 – 2005 June 9
Vladimir Chizhov	2002 November 10 – 2005 July 15
Sergei Kislyak	2003 July 4 – 2008 July 26
Doku Zavgayev	2004 February 17 – 2004 August 13
Aleksandr Alekseyev	2004 August 13 – 2007 January 3
Aleksandr Yakovenko	2005 August 5 – 2011 January 24
Vladimir Titov	2005 October 19 – 2013 April 22
Aleksandr Losyukov	2007 January 3 – 2008 March 26; 2000 March 23 – 2004 March 2
Aleksey Borodavkin	2008 March 26 – 2011 December 5
Gennady Gatilov	2011 January 24 – 2018 January 31
Mikhail Bogdanov	2011 June 12 – 2025 July 9
Igor Morgulov	2011 December 22 – 2022 September 13
Aleksey Meshkov	2012 December 25 – 2017 October 23; 2001 September 6 – 2004 January 20
Vasily Nebenzya	2013 June 1 – 2017 July 26
Oleg Syromolotov	2015 March 19 – 2023 May 19
Anatoly Antonov	2016 December 29 – 2017 August 21

=== Current Deputy Foreign Ministers ===
- Yevgeny Ivanov (5 October 2017 – present)

- (State-Secretary; relations with CIS countries, relations with other state bodies)

- Sergei Ryabkov (15 August 2008 – present)

- (relations with American countries and security and disarmament issues)

- Aleksandr Pankin (23 October 2017 – present)

- (relations with European organizations, countries of Western and Southern Europe)

- Alexander Grushko (6 September 2005 – 23 October 2012; 22 January 2018 – present)

- (relations with European countries, the EU, the OSCE, NATO and the Council of Europe)

- Sergei Vershinin (27 March 2018 – present)
- Andrei Rudenko (19 September 2019 – present)

- (relations with Asian countries)

- Mikhail Galuzin (25 November 2022 – present)

- (relations with CIS countries)

- Dmitry Lyubinsky (18 August 2025 – present)

- (relations with Central and Eastern European countries, human rights issues and countering new challenges and threats)

== General Directors of the Ministry of Foreign Affairs of the Russian Federation ==
Name	Date
Doku Zavgayev	13 August 2004 – 23 September 2009
Mikhail Vanin	23 September 2009 – 6 April 2012
Sergey Mareyev	6 April 2012 – 22 August 2015
Sergey Vyazalov	22 August 2015 – 5 February 2024

=== Current General Director of the Ministry of Foreign Affairs ===
- Alexey Ostrovsky (5 February 2024 – present)

== Gallery ==
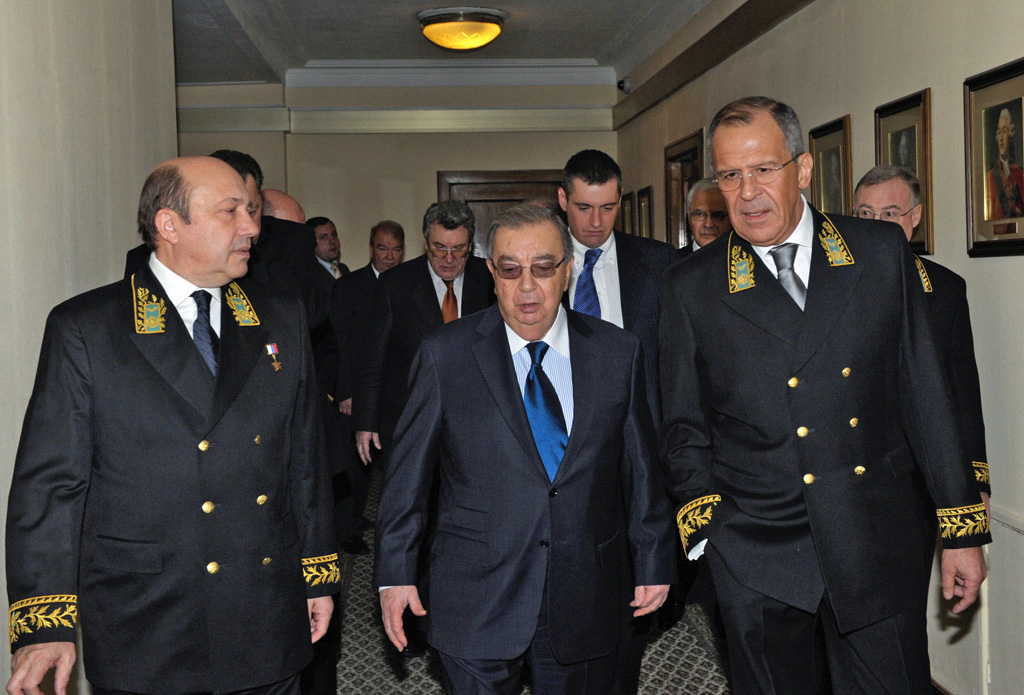
(From right:) Minister Sergei Lavrov with former ministers Yevgeny Primakov and Igor Ivanov.

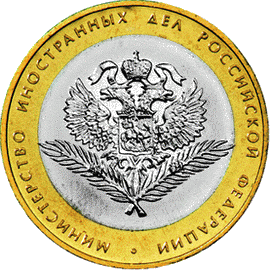
Bank of Russia's 10-ruble commemorative coin: "200th Anniversary of Founding the Ministries in Russia"

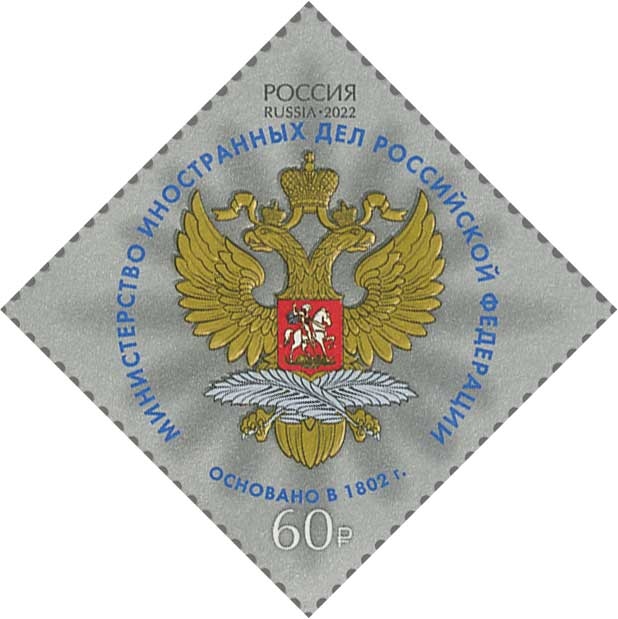
Russian Post's commemorative stamp of the “Ministry of Foreign Affairs of the Russian Federation” from 2022

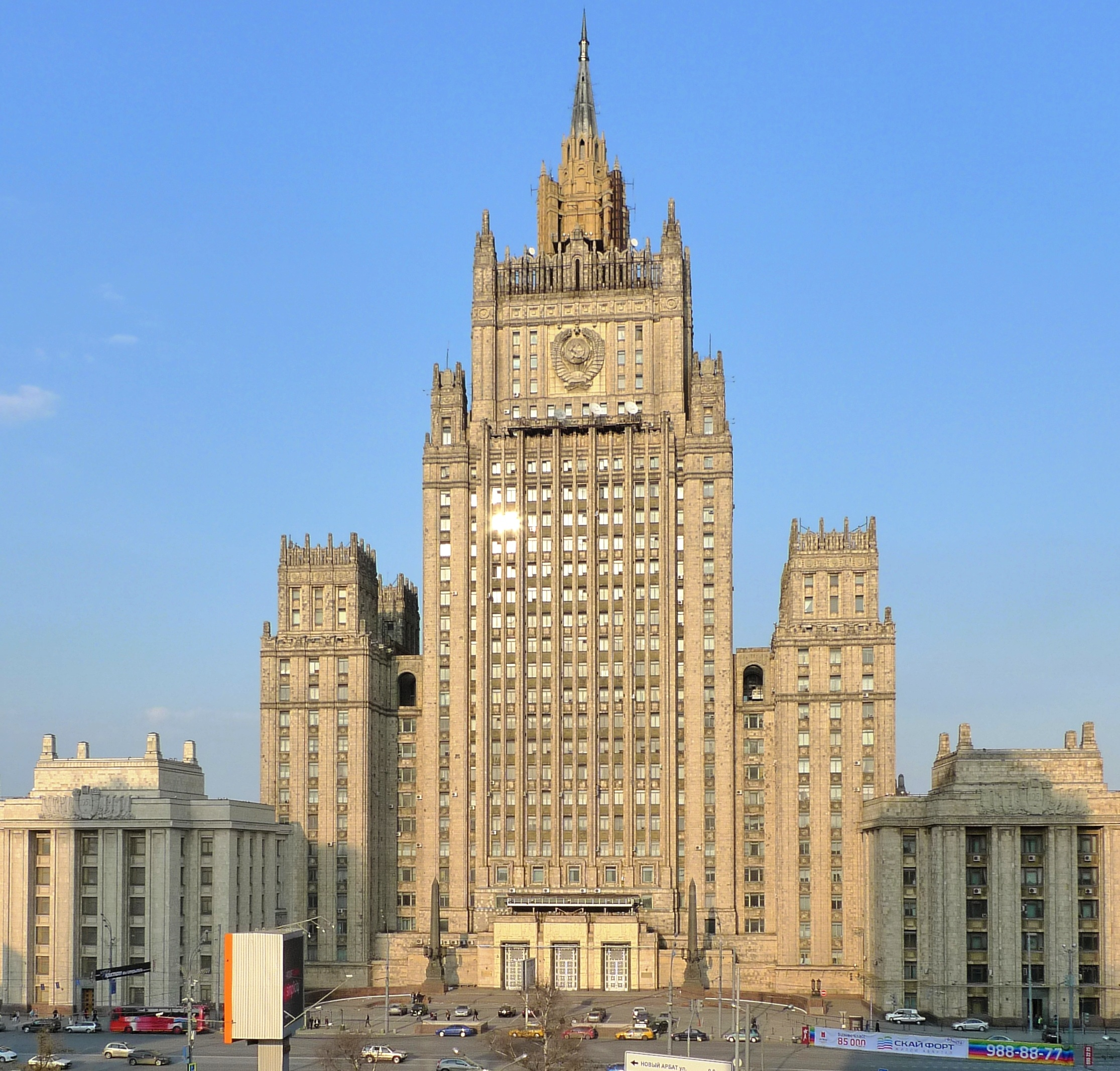
Headquarters in Moscow

== See also ==
- Permanent Mission of Russia to the United Nations
- Foreign Intelligence Service of the Russian Federation (SVR)
- Foreign relations of Russia

In connection with the Moscow building that houses the Ministry's main office:

- All-Russia Exhibition Centre
- Hotel Leningradskaya
- Ministry of Heavy Industry of Russia
- Moscow State University
- Palace of Soviets
- Academy of Science (Riga)
- Seven Sisters (Moscow)
- Triumph-Palace
- Warsaw Palace of Culture and Science
