= International reactions to the 2018 North Korea–United States summit =

Coordinates: 01°14′58″N 103°49′28″E

2018 North Korea–United States Singapore Summit Singapore Summit
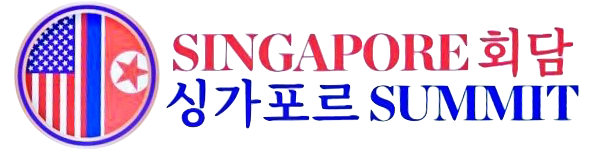
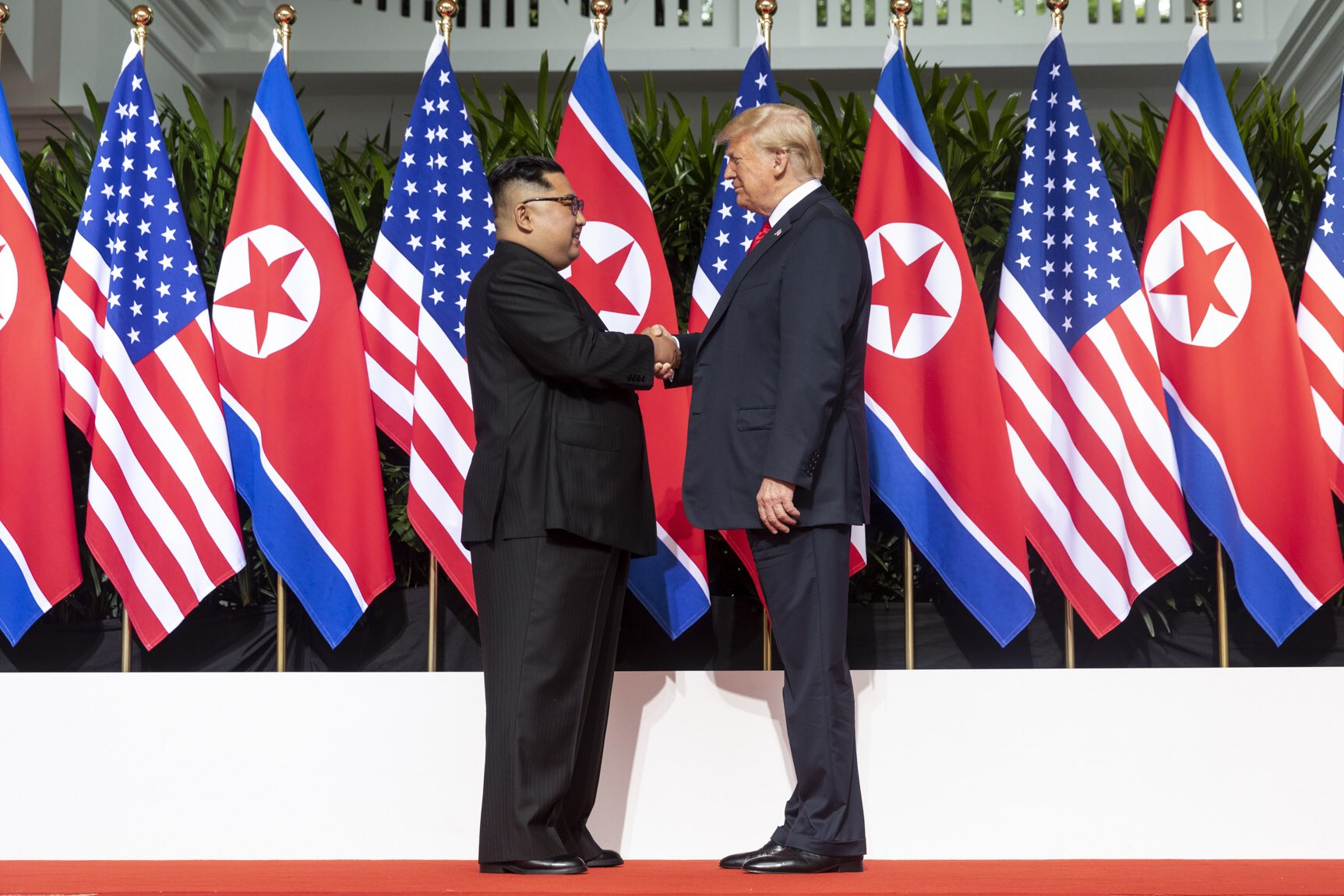
- Kim Jong Un and Donald Trump shaking hands at the start of the summit
- Host country: Singapore
- Date: June 12, 2018; 09:00 SGT (01:00 UTC)
- Venues: Capella Hotel
- Participants: (United States) Donald Trump (North Korea) Kim Jong Un

The leaders of some countries or their representatives or spokespersons released public statements about the 2018 North Korea–United States summit. The summit received a mixed international reaction, with many countries expressing praise or hope for achieving a peace deal from the summit.

== Pre-summit ==
=== Countries ===
==== Australia ====
Foreign Minister Julie Bishop argued that the Trump–Kim summit is a tough diplomatic solution, and that might bring concrete commitments to complete a verifiable denuclearization. It should be achieved for world peace. The denuclearization of the Korean Peninsula should be done even if it is a long drawn out diplomatic process.

==== China ====
General Secretary of the Chinese Communist Party Xi Jinping had a dialogue with President Donald Trump on March 11 about the 2018 North Korea–United States summit. China expressed its appreciation for attempts at resolving the North Korean nuclear issue through diplomacy with the North Korea–United States summit. The White House also believes that North Korea will keep its promise to suspend ICBM launches and North Korean nuclear tests before the North Korea–United States summit in May.

==== Germany ====
Chancellor of Germany Angela Merkel expressed her opinion about Kim–Trump talks; she views "gleams of hope" of achieving the resolution of North's nuclear weapons. Merkel also remarked, "it would be marvellous if we could experience a détente".

==== Japan ====
Shortly after the summit was announced, Prime Minister of Japan Shinzō Abe told reporters he appreciated "North Korea's change" and attributed the diplomatic change in tone to the coordinated sanctions campaign by the United States, Japan, and South Korea. Abe, however, cautioned Trump not to strike a compromise on North Korea's missile program that would leave Japan exposed to shorter-range missiles that do not reach the US mainland or relieve pressure on North Korea too soon before complete denuclearization. Abe also expressed a desire to hold a bilateral meeting with North Korea on the issue of abductions of Japanese citizens, pressing Trump to raise the matter at the summit.

==== Russia ====
Minister of Foreign Affairs Sergey Lavrov embraced the meeting, saying that "it is a step in the right direction" instead of "fire and fury". He also expressed that a legal arrangement between the US and North Korea would be crucial for normalizing the perilous situation around the Korean Peninsula. On May 31, 2018, Sergey Lavrov met with Kim Jong Un in Pyongyang to discuss denuclearization by easing sanctions to speed up the process of disarmament, and in turn, he received a favorable response from the North Korean leader. Lavrov invited the North Korean leader to visit Russia. He told Kim that Moscow supported peace and progress on the Korean peninsula and highly valued a declaration signed by Pyongyang and Seoul. Earlier, Lavrov met with his North Korean counterpart Ri Yong-ho and others at the Supreme People's Assembly building in the North Korean capital. Lavrov and his deputy Igor Morgulov paid their respects at a monument to Soviet soldiers in Pyongyang's Moranbong Park. The Russian Foreign Ministry said earlier Lavrov and Ri were expected to discuss "vital issues of bilateral relations and key international and regional issues".

President Vladimir Putin pledged to ensure that the talks would be a success, suggesting that all regional players such as Russia should provide North Korea with guarantees in order to have a fruitful meeting. He called for the international community to help North Korea economically as they abandon their nuclear weapons program.

==== Singapore ====
Defence Minister Ng Eng Hen announced that they would be willing to pay a certain amount of budget for the US and North Korean delegations' residence and meeting place for the success of the historic Trump–Kim summit.

==== South Korea ====
South Korean President Moon Jae-in expressed hopes for both Trump and Kim to take "bold decisions" in their first meeting, acknowledging the "long process" of North Korea's denuclearization. On the Monday preceding the talks he discussed the summit with Trump in a 40-minute phone call in which Moon told him that the South Korean people were praying to "create a miraculous result" in the talks. Following the announcement of cancellation by Trump of the summit in late May, Moon stated that he was left perplexed and felt "very regrettable" as he and Kim held a second and unplanned summit at Panmunjom to help resolve the lapse of disagreement between Kim and Trump. South Korea hailed the summit as "talks of the century" during the summit.

==== United States ====
National Security Advisor John R. Bolton said that the meeting should focus on denuclearization similar to Libya in 2003. He stated if denuclearized, he would ship the nuclear weapons to Oak Ridge, Tennessee. However, he also warned that if not prepared for serious discussion, the meeting could be short.

Representative Adam Schiff (D-California) said Trump deserved credit for bringing North Korea to the negotiating table.

Several lawmakers and foreign policy experts voiced concerns about the wisdom of agreeing to a summit with insufficient preparations by lower-level officials, mainly due to the lack of trust between the United States and North Korea. Some said Trump could be setting himself up for failure, due to doubts over whether North Korea will willingly give up a formidable atomic arsenal that Kim Jong Un has made central to North Korea's standing in the world.

==== Vatican City ====
On June 10, 2018, Pope Francis expressed hope that the Trump–Kim summit will "contribute to the development of a positive path that will assure a future of peace for the Korean Peninsula and the entire world".

=== International organizations ===
==== European Union ====
A European Parliament delegation led by MEP Nirj Deva acknowledged that they had several secret meetings with senior officials in North Korea for three years with the aim of mitigating the risks imposed by the North Korean nuclear weapons programme. Austrian MEP Paul Rübig, deputy chair of the committee, suggested that the United Nations take part in the Trump-Kim summits to give them an international horizon.

== Post-summit ==
=== Countries ===
==== Australia ====
Australia's Prime Minister Malcolm Turnbull praised Mr. Trump with the resolution of the problematic Denuke issue of DPRK by Trump way as an incredibly persuasive and influential drive. Turnbull defined Mr. Trump as a real deal-maker. Foreign minister Julie Bishop expressed that the Australian government would be willing to assist its expertise to assist in the verification process of the denuclearization of the Korean Peninsula when North Korea's ICBM nuclear weapons are eventually removed.

==== Canada ====
Canadian Prime Minister Justin Trudeau has announced his support for the summit, "We support the continuing efforts by the president on North Korea, (and) we look forward to looking at the details of the agreement".

==== China ====
China, through its Foreign Ministry spokesman Geng Shuang, has announced that it is considering sanctions relief for North Korea. As per the UN Security Council resolutions to North Korea, China conceives that the current sanction measures can be adjusted by Trump and Kim's signing of a joint statement. China has always rigorously complied with all UN resolutions on North Korea so far; however, China has long feared that a collapse of the isolated DPRK could push waves of refugees into northeastern China or unnecessary nuclear war.

==== India ====
The Ministry of Foreign Affairs praised the meeting, but called for an end for the nexus between Pakistan and North Korea, stating, "India welcomes the United States-DRPK summit in Singapore. This is a positive development. India has always supported all efforts to bring peace and stability in the Korean Peninsula through dialogue and diplomacy. We hope that the outcome will be implemented, thus paving the way for lasting peace and stability in the Korean Peninsula. We also hope that the resolution of the Korean Peninsula issue will take into account and address our concerns about proliferation extending India's neighborhood."

==== Iran ====
Government spokesman Mohammad Bagher Nobakht was distrustful of the United States, said "We don't know what type of person the North Korean leader is dealing with. It is not clear that he would not cancel the agreement before returning home."

==== Israel ====
Israeli Prime Minister Benjamin Netanyahu stated on Twitter, "I commend US President Donald Trump on the historic summit in Singapore. This is an important step in the effort to rid the Korean peninsula of nuclear weapons."

==== Italy ====
Italian Prime Minister Giuseppe Conte praised the summit via Twitter, "Today is a historic day for peace and security in the world. Thank you President Donald Trump."

==== Japan ====
Japan's Prime Minister Shinzō Abe announced that he was satisfied with Trump's commitment to the previous meeting with him and through a joint statement with Malaysia he hoped "that the meeting would be successful in bringing progress to the solution of issues related to nuclear armament and missiles". Regarding humanitarian issues, there were 13 Japanese citizens abducted from Japan to North Korea.

==== Malaysia ====
Malaysian Prime Minister Mahathir Mohamad, also welcoming the summit, said "the world should not treat North Korea leader Kim Jong-un with skepticism and instead learn from his new attitude towards bringing about peace". In a joint press conference in Tokyo with Japan, he said: "We hoped for a successful outcome from the historic meeting", adding that "Malaysia will re-open their embassy in North Korea as an end to the diplomatic row over the assassination of Kim Jong-nam last year".

==== North Korea ====
North Korea's Rodong Sinmun devoted a four-page feature to the summit in its Wednesday edition, welcoming its results. The article carried the text of the declaration in full. In addition, it mentioned security guarantees and Trump's pledge to cease the joint military exercises with South Korea. It failed to mention the promise Kim had allegedly made to Trump about closing down a test site for missile engines, however.

==== Philippines ====
Philippine Presidential spokesperson Harry Roque issued the statement which is "We welcome the landmark summit between US President Donald Trump and DPRK leader Kim Jong Un in Singapore," and stressed that "History has indeed been written." and "At the same time, this is but the beginning of a peace process." The Philippines government is ready and willing to grant its support toward bringing it to final fruition.

==== Russia ====
The Russian Deputy Foreign Minister Sergei Ryabkov issued a formal statement applauding Trump–Kim's decision, detailing that it was required to finish any provocative operation on the Korean Peninsula. Sergei also summarised that the US–DPRK summit galvanizes Korean Peninsula settlement of peace.

==== Singapore ====
Prime Minister Lee Hsien Loong congratulated both leaders in separate letters sent to them on the successful outcome of the summit and wished both countries success in implementing the agreement signed. He also thanked Singaporeans and those who worked on the summit.

On June 25, the Ministry of Foreign Affairs announced that the total cost of the summit was S$16.3 million instead of the earlier estimate of S$20 million.

==== South Korea ====
South Korea's presidential office Blue House and president Moon Jae-in announced that the outcome of the Trump-Kim summit reflected the "bold determination of the two leaders", and that Moon is able to see Kim Jong Un's sincerity for commitment of the decisive, proactive actions for the denuclearization process. However, Moon stressed that about 65 years of hostility with complex nuclear ICBM issue would not be resolved by a single summit, but would require continuous cooperation for the denuclearization process. South Korean officials and US White House press secretary Sarah Huckabee Sanders confirmed that the war games which is named of "Ulchi Freedom Guardian"(UFG) operation would be suspend following Trump-Kim summit in Singapore as per the denuclearisation process on Korea peninsula. South Korea president Moon Jae-in supported the success of Trump-Kim summit although there are diverse of opinions. Moon believes that most South Koreans support his direction for peace on the Korean Peninsula, as demonstrated in the results of the local South Korean elections that had just taken place a day after the summit in which his party had won 13 out of 17 local elections. Kyunghyang Shinmun, a liberal newspaper, said that Trump and Kim have started a "march of peace" that would lead to a permanent cessation of hostilities. The Chosun Ilbo expressed concern that as a result of Trump's concessions, the North would keep its nuclear weapons program permanently. It described the summit as "dumbfounding and nonsensical". The Democrats party in South Korea is currently getting the high rate of approval rating which is 80% of the population, and president Moon Jae-in's political party believe that it would be time to pursue a vigorous détente of peace on the Korean Peninsula.

==== Taiwan ====
The Ministry of Foreign Affairs of Taiwan issued a news report expressing its pleasure at the specific consensus reached between the United States and North Korea at the summit meeting, and will continue to cooperate with the international community as a means of promoting regional peace and stability. The senior officials of the Republic of China who are familiar with the national security of Taiwan pointed out that Tsai Ing-wen, the President of Taiwan, has been using the various channels to grasp the relevant information of the summit and has maintained close and unimpeded contacts with relevant countries.

==== Thailand ====
Thailand's Ministry of Foreign Affairs stated in a press release that "this epoch-making summit reflects the strong commitment of the two leaders to achieve sustained peace, stability and prosperity on the Korean Peninsula with denuclearisation as the key step". Prime Minister Prayut Chan-o-cha said that the summit was "a good sign to the world, if [Supreme Leader Kim Jong Un and President Donald Trump] can practice what they agreed".

==== Ukraine ====
The President of Ukraine, Petro Poroshenko, greeted the meeting with praise, "I congratulate the results of the historic meeting between the US President and the leader of the DPRK in Singapore. Thanks to the decisive leadership of President Trump, the path to peace in the Korean peninsula is no longer so impossible." But he later added the restriction: "I hope that the US security guarantees in connection with the denuclearization of the peninsula will take into account the drawbacks of the Budapest Memorandum on Security Safeguards in Ukraine."

==== United Kingdom ====
Foreign Secretary Boris Johnson took to Twitter after the summit ended and said in a tweet, "Welcome the news that President Trump and Kim Jong Un have held constructive talks in Singapore. The DPRK's commitment to complete denuclearization of the Korean Peninsula is an important first step towards a stable and prosperous future."

The UK's Conservative MEP Nirj Deva, who for the past 30 months has been engaged in behind the scenes negotiations to defuse tensions between North and South Korea, hailed the meeting between North Korean leader Kim Jong Un and US President Donald Trump as historic. He congratulated both leaders for their willingness to engage in optimistic diplomacy, without pre-conditions.

==== United States ====
Fred and Cindy Warmbier, the parents of Otto Warmbier, praised Trump for his comments about the family and stated that they hope something positive comes from this. Arkansas senator Tom Cotton praised the summit as a positive step. Trump tweeted that the summit helped the world to avert a "nuclear catastrophe" and thanked Chairman Kim for the "historic" meeting.

On June 28, more than two weeks after the summit United States Secretary of State Mike Pompeo rebuked President Trump's tweet and states that North Korea is still a nuclear threat.

==== Vietnam ====
The Foreign Ministry spokeswoman Le Thi Thu Hang praised the summit, "Vietnam highly appreciates the outcome of the historic summit between North Korea and the U.S. in Singapore".

=== International organizations ===
==== Association of Southeast Asian Nations ====
Foreign ministers of ASEAN countries welcomed the Trump-Kim summit as a "significant first step towards the realisation of lasting peace and stability on a denuclearised Korean peninsula". They also valued the significance of the promises between two leaders "unwavering commitment to a complete denuclearisation of the Korean peninsula" and "providing security guarantees to North Korea". The remarks announced four days after the event.

==== European Union ====
European Union diplomatic chief Federica Mogherini issued the statement that EU praised the summit between US President Donald Trump and North Korean leader Kim Jong Un. It is "crucial and necessary step" for denuclearization of the Korean peninsula. EU will be ready to "facilitate and support the follow-on negotiations and other steps" for a peace settlement.

==== International Atomic Energy Agency ====
The IAEA director general Yukiya Amano welcomed the "Joint Statement of President Trump of the United States and Chairman Kim of the DPRK which includes the DPRK's commitment towards complete denuclearization of the Korean Peninsula" He also added that "IAEA will stand ready to undertake any verification activities in the DPRK's nuclear program."

==== NATO ====
NATO (North Atlantic Treaty Organization) Secretary General Jens Stoltenberg welcomes US-DPRK summit, backs denuclearized peninsula and Jens added that "NATO strongly supports all efforts leading towards the eventual denuclearization of the Korean Peninsula."

==== United Nations ====
United Nations (UN) Secretary-General António Guterres welcomed the USA–DPRK summit and expressed that it is "a crucial milestone" for peace of the world. Guterres urged the significance of "seize this momentous opportunity" and UN will assist utterly to achieve the goal of dismantling DPRK's nuclear weapons program.
