= Gontar =

Gontar is a Russian occupational surname that refers to a roofer or shingler. The occupational meaning is obsolete, as with many such surnames including the equivalent in English Shingler, and German Schindler. Gontar derives from Russian gont (гонт), shingle, from Polish gont, shingle, from Middle High German gant, beam, from Latin cantherius, rafter, from Greek kanthelion (κανθήλιον), rafter. The English word gantry also derives from the Latin cantherius.

The same slavic word for shingle, and the surname, also exist in Ukrainian as both Gontar and Hontar, and in Polish, Gontar. The Ukrainian spelling "Гонтар" is pronounced close to what would be in English Hontar, reflecting the kind of difference in Horowitz and Gorowitz, and H versus G in other versions of that name.

75% of people bearing the Gontar spelling live in Russia, at 3,192. Yet 99% of people bearing the Hontar spelling live in Ukraine, and more than double the bearers of the Gontar spelling worldwide.

Notable people with the surname include:

- Abram Yutkovich Gontar (1908–1981), Soviet Jewish poet and novelist of Ukrainian origin, participant in the Kengir uprising
- Anastasiia Gontar, Russian Paralympic swimmer
- Anna Hontar, Ukrainian Paralympic swimmer
- Nikolai Gontar (born 1949), Russian footballer
- Olga Gontar (born 1979), Belarusian rhythmic gymnast
- Viktor Petrovich Gontar (1905–1987), son-in-law of Nikita Khrushchev; from 1954, administrative director of the Russian Drama Theater and Kyiv Opera; later administrative director of the National Philharmonic of Ukraine

== See also ==
- Gonchar
