= Lenin Statue (Kotka) =

The Lenin Statue located in Kotka, Finland, is a monument to Vladimir Lenin sculpted by the Estonian sculptor Matti Varik. The statue was unveiled on 26 August 1979, and was a gift from Tallinn, one of Kotka's sister cities. The statue is a bust and stands over two meters tall. It is made of bronze and granite. The statue was originally located in the western part of Kotka's city center, on Kotkansaari island, in a small park on Pohjoispuistokatu Street. It is believed that Lenin stayed overnight in a wooden house next to the park in the early 1900s. In 2022, the city of Kotka decided to relocate the statue to the regional museum. Proposals to move the statue were made because it was seen as offensive to the memory of those who perished as victims of Soviet war crimes.

== History ==
The idea for the statue began when the political leadership of the Soviet Union promised a statue to Kotka. After that, Kotka's sister city Tallinn was ordered to donate it. The statue was unveiled by the Soviet Union's ambassador, Vladimir Sobolev, who gave a speech praising the good relations between Finland and the Soviet Union. On behalf of Kotka, the statue was received by city council chairman Arvi Forss. The speech for the handover was given by Karl Vaino, the first secretary of the Communist Party of the Estonian Soviet Socialist Republic. Among the invited guests were the ambassadors of Poland, East Germany, and Czechoslovakia, as well as the governor of the Kymi province, Erkki Huurtamo.

The statue was vandalized in the 1980s, when it was covered in red paint.

In Finland, Lenin statues in public outdoor spaces existed in Kotka and Turku. In addition, two Lenin statues are on display indoors at the Lenin Museum in Tampere.

== Lenin's Missing Arm ==
In 1995, as part of the Port of Kotka art exhibition, a sculpture by Polish sculptor Krzysztof Bednarski called Lenin's Missing Arm was unveiled near the Lenin statue. From a certain angle, the arm of the sculpture appeared to be connected to the Lenin statue. The materials used were bronze and granite. This work was also removed in October 2022.
