= Viktor Avilov =

Viktor Avilov may refer to:

- Viktor Avilov (diplomat)
- Viktor Avilov (actor)
