= Denis Gonchar =

Russian diplomat

- Денис Гончар

Russian Ambassador to Belgium
- Incumbent
- Assumed office 29 July 2025
- President: Vladimir Putin
- Preceded by: Aleksandr Tokovinin

Personal details
- Born: Denis Vladimirovich Gonchar; 9 November 1973 (age 53)
- Education: Moscow State Institute of International Relations
- Awards: Medal of the Order "For Merit to the Fatherland" Second Class; Russian Federation Presidential Certificate of Honour; Letter of Gratitude from the President of the Russian Federation

Denis Vladimirovich Gonchar (Russian: Денис Владимирович Гончар; born 9 November 1973) is a Russian diplomat who has served as Russian Ambassador to Belgium since 2025.

Gonchar graduated from the Moscow State Institute of International Relations in 1996, and began working for the Ministry of Foreign Affairs that year. He went on to serve both in the central office of the ministry, and in several overseas postings. He was Minister-Counselor at the Embassy of Russia in the USA from 2015 to 2018. He briefly served as chargé d'affaires following the withdrawal of Sergey Kislyak as Russian ambassador to the United States, and until the arrival of Kislyak's replacement, Anatoly Antonov. Gonchar returned to Russia in 2018, and was deputy director of the Fourth Department of CIS Countries at the central ministry until April 2019, when he became the department's director. He was appointed to the diplomatic rank of Ambassador Extraordinary and Plenipotentiary in February 2024.

On 29 July 2025, Gonchar was appointed the Russian Ambassador to Belgium. He presented his credentials to King Philippe on 17 September 2025. He speaks English, Arabic, and French, in addition to his native Russian. He was awarded the Medal of the Order "For Merit to the Fatherland" Second Class in 2021.
