= List of ambassadors of Russia to Luxembourg =

Ambassador of the Russian Federation to the Grand Duchy of Luxembourg
- Emblem of the Russian Foreign Ministry
- Incumbent; Dmitry Lobanov since 17 September 2020
- Ministry of Foreign Affairs; Embassy of Russia in Luxembourg
- Style: His Excellency; The Honourable
- Reports to: Minister of Foreign Affairs
- Seat: Luxembourg
- Appointer: President of Russia
- Term length: At the pleasure of the president
- Website: Embassy of Russia in Luxembourg

The ambassador of Russia to Luxembourg is the official representative of the president and the government of the Russian Federation to the grand duke and the government of Luxembourg.

The ambassador and his staff work at large in the Russian embassy in Luxembourg. The current Russian ambassador to Luxembourg is Dmitry Lobanov, incumbent since 17 September 2020.

== History of diplomatic relations ==
Russian relations with Luxembourg date back into the nineteenth century, when as part of the Concert of Europe, the Russian Empire was one of the signatories to the Treaty of London in 1867, making it one of the guarantors of the borders of the Grand Duchy and its neutrality. Formal diplomatic relations were established in 1891, and after the Russian Revolution in 1917 and the emergence of the Soviet Union, an exchange of diplomats was agreed in 1935. Relations were interrupted for a time by the Second World War, during which time Luxembourg was occupied by Axis forces.

Following the German invasion of Luxembourg on 10 May 1940, a Luxembourg government in exile was established in London. On 13 October 1942 the Soviet ambassador to the Allied governments, Aleksandr Bogomolov, was accredited to the Luxembourg government in exile. Relations were restored in 1946, albeit with a non-resident ambassador, Soviet affairs prior to 1956 being handled by the ambassador to Belgium, who had dual accreditation. It was not until late 1960 that the mission was upgraded to the level of an embassy, with Pavel Gerasimov appointed as ambassador on 28 June 1961. With the dissolution of the Soviet Union at the end of 1991, the Russian Federation emerged as the Soviet Union's legal successor. The incumbent ambassador of the Soviet Union to Luxembourg, Chinghiz Aitmatov, continued as representative of Russia until 1994.

== List of representatives (1936–present) ==
=== Soviet Union to Luxembourg (1936–1991) ===
Name	Title	Appointment	Termination	Notes
Yevgeny Rubinin	Plenipotentiary	21 September 1936	15 July 1940	
Second World War – Diplomatic relations interrupted (1940–1942)
Aleksandr Bogomolov	Envoy	13 October 1942	30 November 1943	As Soviet ambassador to the Allied governments
Viktor Lebedev	Envoy	30 November 1943	17 November 1945	As Soviet ambassador to the Allied governments
Mikhail Sergeyev	Envoy	17 November 1945	12 July 1946	Non-resident, ambassador to Belgium dually accredited
Aleksey Pavlov	Envoy	12 July 1946	27 April 1950	Non-resident, ambassador to Belgium dually accredited
Viktor Avilov	Envoy	24 January 1953	16 May 1956	Non-resident, ambassador to Belgium dually accredited
Ivan Melnik	Envoy	16 May 1956	28 June 1961	
Pavel Gerasimov	Ambassador	28 June 1961	29 September 1962	
Igor Yezhov	Ambassador	29 September 1962	21 March 1967	
Ivan Fillipov	Ambassador	21 March 1967	21 August 1969	
Yevgeny Kosarev	Ambassador	21 August 1969	19 September 1979	
Kamo Udumian	Ambassador	19 September 1979	7 August 1987	
Aleksandr Avdeyev	Ambassador	7 August 1987	5 October 1990	
Chinghiz Aitmatov	Ambassador	5 October 1990	25 December 1991	

=== Russian Federation to Luxembourg (1991–present) ===
Name	Title	Appointment	Termination	Notes
Chinghiz Aitmatov	Ambassador	25 December 1991	6 January 1994	
Aleksei Glukhov	Ambassador	6 January 1994	23 July 1997	
Oleg Krivonogov	Ambassador	23 July 1997	9 November 2001	
Yuri Kapralov	Ambassador	9 November 2001	25 July 2005	
Eduard Malayan	Ambassador	25 July 2005	16 September 2009	
Aleksandr Shulgin	Ambassador	16 September 2009	2 September 2012	
Mark Entin	Ambassador	2 October 2012	20 January 2016	
Viktor Sorokin	Ambassador	20 January 2016	17 September 2020	
Dmitry Lobanov	Ambassador	17 September 2020		
