= List of ambassadors of Russia to China =

Russian Ambassador to China
- Emblem of Ministry of Foreign Affairs of Russia

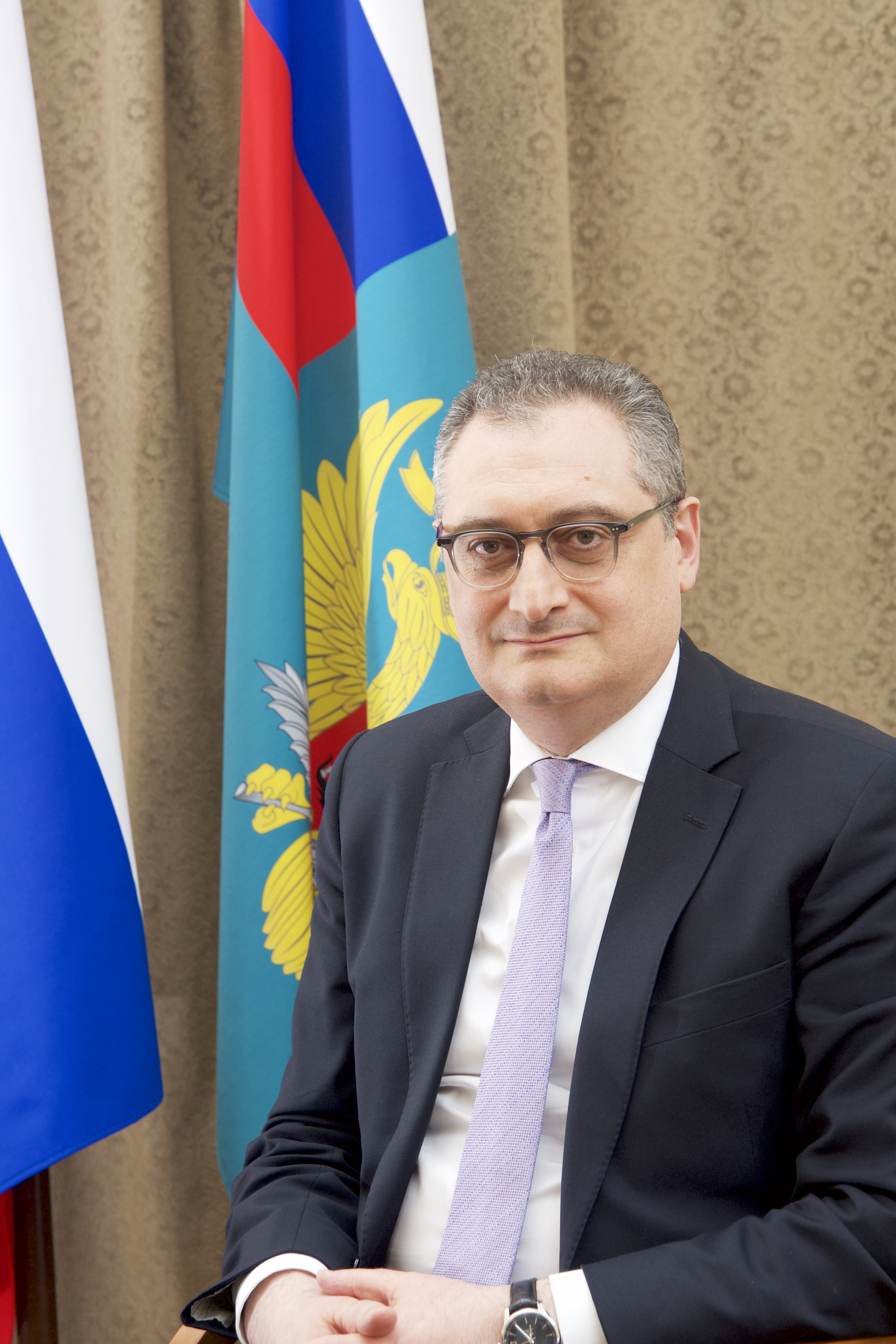
- Incumbent; Igor Morgulov since 13 September 2022
- Ministry of Foreign Affairs; Embassy of Russia in Beijing
- Style: His Excellency
- Residence: Beijing
- Appointer: President of Russia
- Term length: At the president's pleasure
- Deputy: Ivan Zhelokhovtsev (Deputy Head of Mission)
- Website: Embassy of Russia in China

The ambassador extraordinary and plenipotentiary of the Russian Federation to the People's Republic of China (PRC) is the official representative of the president and the government of the Russian Federation to the president and the government of China.

The ambassador and his staff work at large in the Embassy of Russia in Beijing. There are consulates general in Shanghai, Guangzhou, Shenyang and Hong Kong. The post of Russian ambassador to China is currently held by Igor Morgulov, incumbent since 13 September 2022.

== History of diplomatic relations ==
Diplomatic exchanges between Russia and China began in the seventeenth century, with the occasional dispatch of embassies and missions. One of the earliest was that of Fyodor Baykov in the 1650s. Relations were put on a more permanent footing with the opening of the Russian mission in Peking in 1860. Relations were interrupted by the Russian Revolution in 1917, and with the Bolshevik seizure of power, the existing missions in China ceased to be recognised by the Soviets. They nevertheless continued to operate on behalf of Russian émigrés into the 1920s. Diplomatic relations were established between the Soviet Union and the Republic of China, with the visit of representatives from 1921, before being broken off briefly between 1929 and 1932. The mission was raised to the level of an embassy in 1941, and continued after the establishment of the People's Republic of China. With the dissolution of the Soviet Union in 1991, diplomatic relations have continued between the People's Republic of China and the Russian Federation.

== List of representatives ==
Below are the list of ambassadors from the Tsardom of Russia era to the present day.

=== Tsardom of Russia to China (1658–1721) ===
| Name | Title | Appointment | Termination | Notes |
|---|---|---|---|---|
| Fyodor Baykov | Chief of mission | 1658 | 1658 | |
| Nikolai Spathari | Chief of mission | 1675 | 1678 | |
| Lev Izmailov | Chief of mission | 16 June 1719 | 13 March 1721 | |

=== Russian Empire to China (1721–1912) ===
| Name | Title | Appointment | Termination | Notes |
|---|---|---|---|---|
| Ivan Lang | Resident | 2 March 1721 | August 1722 | |
| Sava Vladislavich | Resident | 1725 | 1728 | |
| Vasily Bratishchev | Chief of mission | 30 May 1756 | 4 October 1757 | |
| Ivan Kropotov | Chief of mission | 1762 | 1763 | |
| Yury Golovkin | Ambassador | 17 February 1805 | 1807 | |
| Yevfimy Putyatin | Envoy | 1857 | 1858 | |
| Nikolai Ignatyev | Special Envoy | 1859 | 1861 | |
| Lev Ballyuzek | Resident Minister | 1861 | 1863 | |
| Aleksandr Vlangali | Envoy | 30 November 1863 | 5 October 1873 | |
| Yevgeny Byutsov | Chargé d'affaires | 21 April 1869 | October 1870 | |
| Aleksandr Koyander | Chargé d'affaires | 5 October 1873 | 23 March 1874 | |
| Yevgeny Byutsov | Envoy | 23 March 1874 | 10 November 1882 | |
| Aleksandr Koyander | Chargé d'affaires | 31 March 1878 | 8 April 1881 | |
| Karl Weber | Envoy | 10 November 1882 | 15 October 1883 | |
| Sergei Popov | Envoy | 15 October 1883 | 19 March 1886 | |
| Nikolai Ladyzhensky | Chargé d'affaires | 19 March 1886 | 23 November 1886 | |
| Aleksey Kumani | Envoy | 23 November 1886 | 1 April 1890 | |
| Konstantin Kleimenov | Envoy | 1 April 1890 | September 1891 | |
| Arthur Cassini | Envoy | 17 November 1891 | 3 October 1896 | |
| Aleksandr Pavlov | Chargé d'affaires | 3 October 1896 | 24 November 1898 | |
| Alexey Shpeyer | Envoy | 6 November 1897 | 8 June 1898 | |
| Mikhail von Giers | Envoy | 24 November 1898 | 29 September 1901 | |
| Pavel Lessar | Envoy | 29 September 1901 | 1 March 1905 | |
| Georgy Planson | Chargé d'affaires | 27 November 1902 | February 1903 | |
| Grigory Kozakov | Envoy | April 1905 | May 1905 | |
| Dmitry Pokotilov | Envoy | May 1905 | 7 March 1908 | |
| Yevgeny Golubev | Chargé d'affaires | 8 March 1908 | 30 August 1908 | |
| Ivan Korostovets | Envoy | 30 August 1908 | 1912 | |
| Mikhail Shchekin | Chargé d'affaires | 2 June 1910 | 22 September 1910 | |

=== Russian Empire to the Republic of China (1912–1917) ===
| Name | Title | Appointment | Termination | Notes |
|---|---|---|---|---|
| Vasily Krupensky | Envoy | 1912 | 1916 | |
| Nikolai Kudashev | Envoy | 1916 | 26 November 1917 | Continued as de facto representative until 1920 |

=== Soviet Russia to the Republic of China (1921–1922) ===
| Name | Title | Appointment | Termination | Notes |
|---|---|---|---|---|
| Aleksandr Paykes | Diplomatic representative | December 1921 | 1922 | |
| Adolph Joffe | Diplomatic representative | 6 July 1922 | 3 June 1923 | |

=== Soviet Union to the Republic of China (1922–1949) ===
| Name | Title | Appointment | Termination | Notes |
|---|---|---|---|---|
| Lev Karakhan | Diplomatic representative | 3 June 1924 | 10 September 1926 | |
| Aleksey Chernykh | Diplomatic representative | 1926 | 1927 | |
Diplomatic relations interrupted (1927–1932)
| Dmitry Bogomolov | Diplomatic representative | 20 February 1933 | 7 October 1937 | |
| Ivan Luganets-Orelsky | Diplomatic representative | 23 November 1937 | 10 July 1939 | |
| Alexander Panyushkin | Diplomatic representative Ambassador after 9 May 1941 | 28 August 1939 | 3 April 1945 | |
| Apollon Petrov | Ambassador | 3 April 1945 | 25 February 1948 | |
| Nikolai Roshchin | Ambassador | 25 February 1948 | 2 October 1949 | |

=== Soviet Union to the People's Republic of China (1949–1991) ===
| Name | Title | Appointment | Termination | Notes |
|---|---|---|---|---|
| Nikolai Roshchin | Ambassador | 2 October 1949 | 13 June 1952 | |
| Alexander Panyushkin | Ambassador | 13 June 1952 | 10 March 1953 | |
| Vasili Kuznetsov | Ambassador | 10 March 1953 | 3 December 1953 | |
| Pavel Yudin | Ambassador | 3 December 1953 | 15 October 1959 | |
| Stepan Chervonenko | Ambassador | 15 October 1959 | 13 April 1965 | |
| Sergey Lapin | Ambassador | 13 April 1965 | 12 April 1967 | |
| Vasily Tolstikov | Ambassador | 16 October 1970 | 24 July 1978 | |
| Ilya Shcherbakov | Ambassador | 24 July 1978 | 11 March 1986 | |
| Oleg Troyanovsky | Ambassador | 11 March 1986 | 7 August 1990 | |
| Nikolai Solovyov | Ambassador | 7 August 1990 | 25 December 1991 | |

=== Russian Federation to the People's Republic of China (1991–present) ===
| Name | Title | Appointment | Termination | Notes |
|---|---|---|---|---|
| Nikolai Solovyov | Ambassador | 25 December 1991 | 24 January 1992 | |
| Igor Rogachyov | Ambassador | 24 January 1992 | 10 June 2005 | |
| Sergey Razov | Ambassador | 10 June 2005 | 21 April 2013 | |
| Andrey Denisov | Ambassador | 22 April 2013 | 13 September 2022 | |
| Igor Morgulov | Ambassador | 13 September 2022 | | |

== See also ==
- Representative Office in Taipei for the Moscow-Taipei Coordination Commission on Economic and Cultural Cooperation
