= Gonchar =

Gonchar (Belarusian: Гонча́р) is a Russian-language occupational surname, literally meaning "potter". Notable people with the surname include:

- Andrey Gonchar (mathematician)
- Denis V. Gonchar
- Sergei Gonchar
