= Embassy of Russia, Luxembourg =

Embassy of the Russian Federation in Luxembourg Посольство Российской Федерации в Люксембурге Ambassade de la Fédération de Russie à Luxembourg
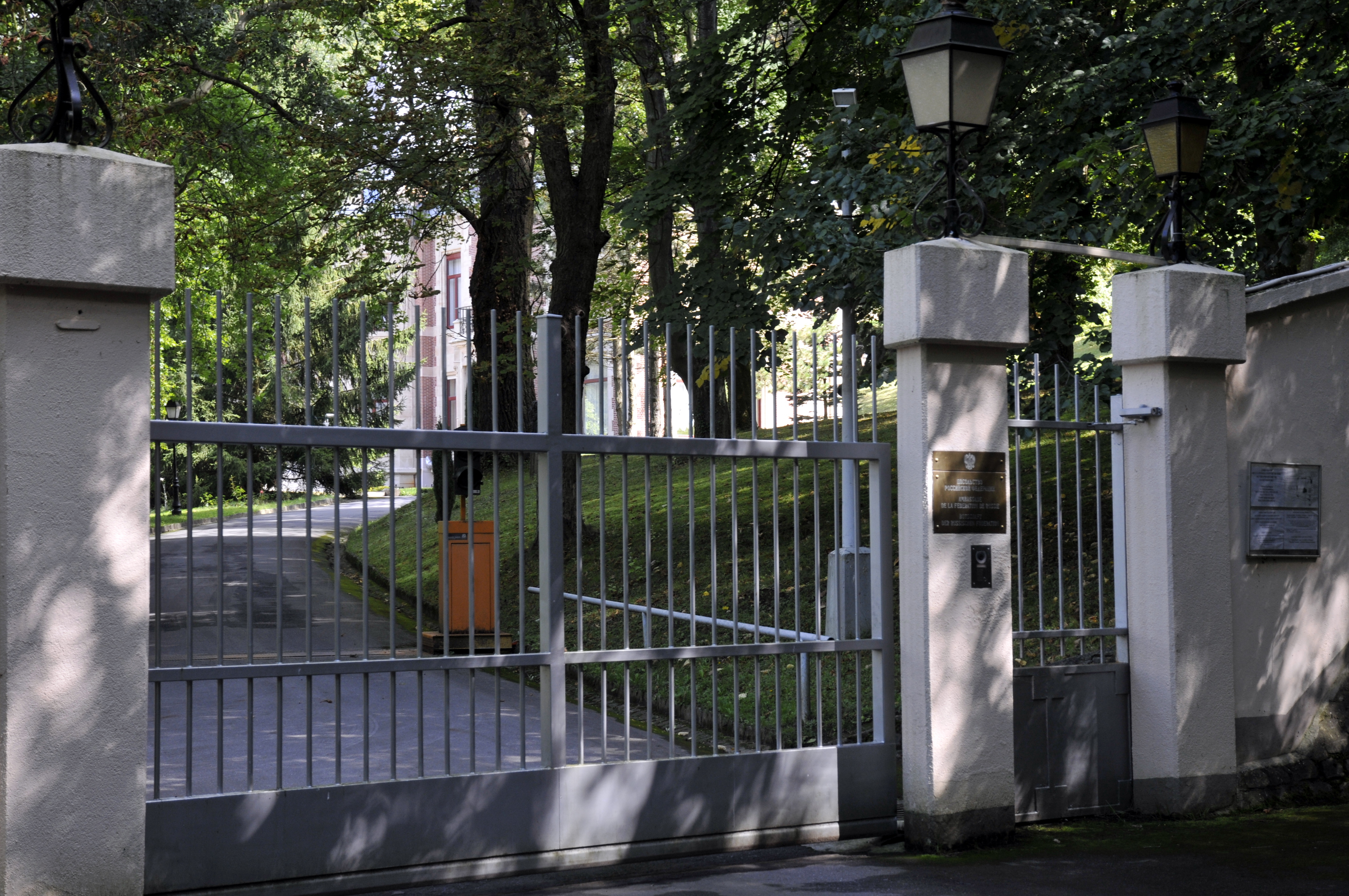
- Location: Beggen, Luxembourg
- Address: Château de Beggen
- Coordinates: 49.6435°N 6.1385°E
- Ambassador: Mark Entin

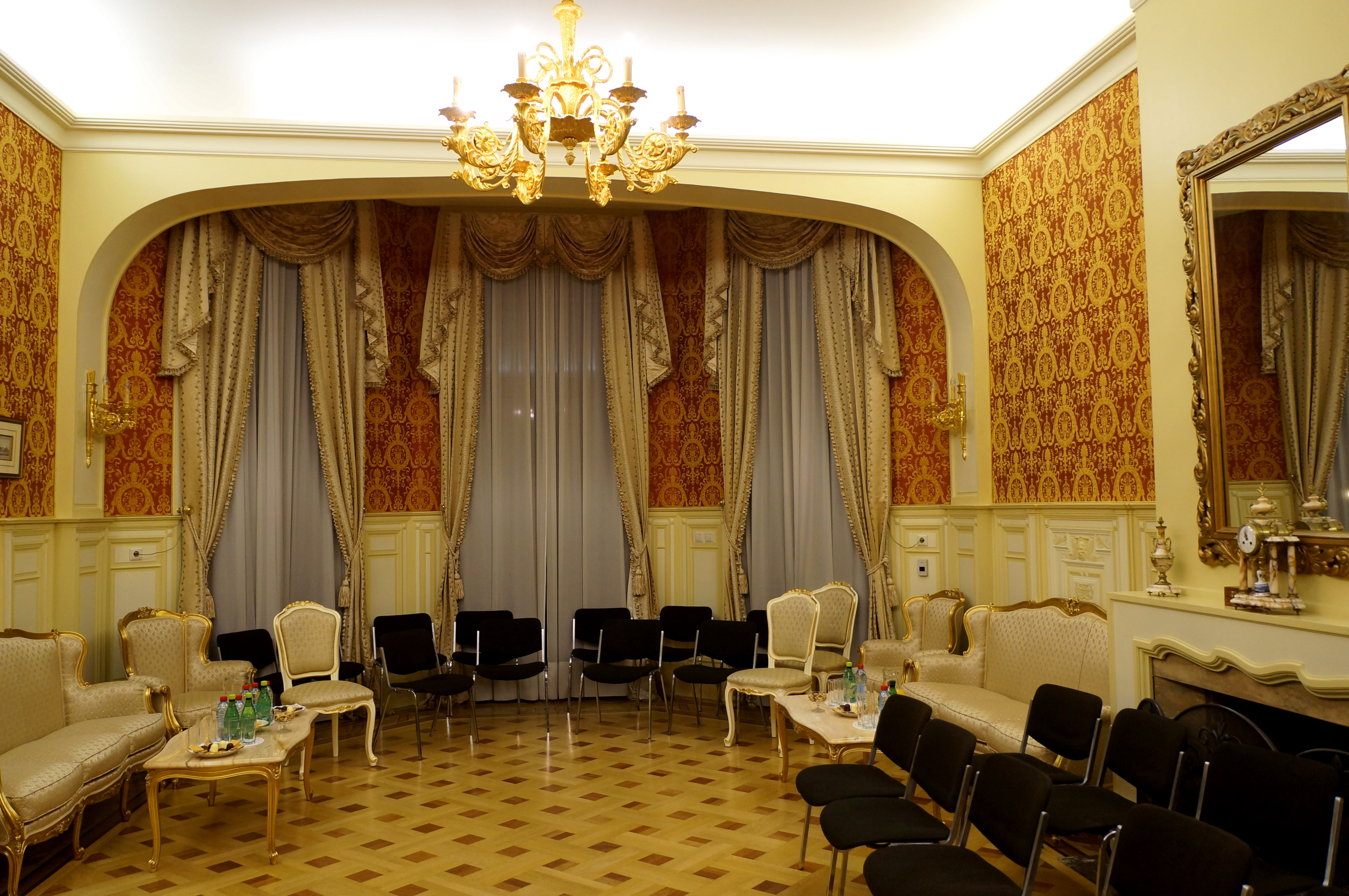
Reception Hall in the Embassy of Russia in Luxembourg

The Embassy of Russia in Luxembourg is the diplomatic mission of the Russian Federation to the Grand Duchy of Luxembourg. The mission is located in the historic Château de Beggen.

== History of Château de Beggen ==
The site on which the château is located was purchased in the 18th century by Pierre Bourgeois, the owner of the first paper mill in Senningen, and another paper mill was built on this site. The mill was powered by water from the Donnersbach, which flowed from the side of Grünewald; it operated into the first decades of the 19th century. The property was purchased by Auguste Dutreux before 1851.

The property was purchased on 23 October 1865 by Metz & Co, and in 1866 the Donnersbach was redirected to supply the company's steel mill at Dommeldange. During the 1880s, Émile Metz built a villa on the site; however, this burned to the ground in January 1894. From 1894 to 1895, Wynand Janssens, an architect from Brussels, built the present château in a historicist style reminiscent of Vaux-le-Vicomte and Château de Fontainebleau. When Metz died in 1904, the property passed to his widow Edmée Tesch. When Mme Tesch died in 1919, in the absence of direct heirs the property was bequeathed equally to Emile Mayrisch (the Director General of ARBED) and Gaston Barbanson. Barbanson bought Mayrisch's share in the property in 1923, and lived in the property until 10 May 1940, when Nazi Germany invaded and occupied Luxembourg. The Barbanson family fled south to France, and from 1940 to 1944 the property was occupied by the Wehrmacht. From October 1944 to September 1945 units of the US Army were stationed in the property.

When Barbanson died in 1946, his widow and daughter waived their rights of inheritance, and the property passed to a charitable fund set up in 1913 by Edmée Tesch. On 2 March 1948, the governing council of the fund decided to sell the property, and in 1949 a Belgian businessman bought the property for 4.2 million Belgian francs. From 1950 to 1956 the property was utilised as a hotel named Hôtel des Forges. The hotel was rented during 1951 as the first headquarters of the High Authority of the European Coal and Steel Community, predecessor of the European Commission, that had just been born.

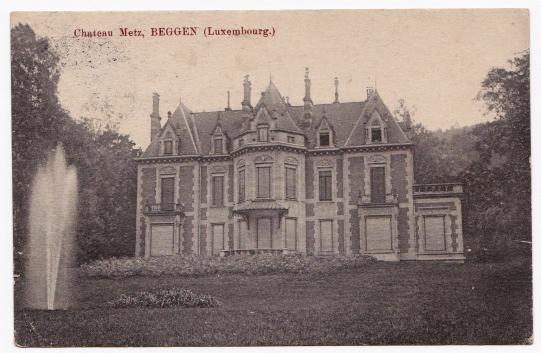
The Château de Beggen (then called Château Metz) in 1913

In 1956 the château was rented by the Soviet Union to allow their diplomatic mission in Luxembourg to open. During the Hungarian Revolution of 1956 the mission was attacked by a group of demonstrators, and the ground floor of the château sustained considerable damage. On 5 June 1973 the château and an adjacent 2.8 hectare plot of land was sold to the Embassy of the Soviet Union for 8.5 million francs.

From 2005 to 2009 the château underwent extensive renovation and reconstruction, and the interiors were restored to their former glory. During the works, which cost some four million euros, embassy staff worked temporarily in other buildings on the site. The ambassador, who normally utilised the château as his official residence, was also required to find other accommodations, and embassy functions were hosted in the Grand Théâtre. The damaged mosaics in the château were restored using expensive procedures; rotten wooden doors, walls and ceilings were reproduced; and the château was fitted with furniture manufactured in Italy and accessories purchased in the antiques markets. Emile Hengen of Tageblatt called the renovated château the 'most magnificent' embassy in Luxembourg.

In September 2009, the château was a major attraction of European Heritage Days in Luxembourg, and some 300 members of the public visited the property.

== See also ==
- List of ambassadors of Russia to Luxembourg
- List of castles in Luxembourg
