= Oleg Krivonogov =

Soviet and Russian diplomat (1938–2021)

- Олег Кривоногов

Ambassador of Russia to Luxembourg
- In office 6 September 1997 – 9 November 2001
- Preceded by: Aleksei Glukhov
- Succeeded by: Yuri Kapralov

Personal details
- Born: 27 July 1938 Moscow, Russian SFSR, Soviet Union
- Died: 7 May 2021 (aged 82)
- Education: Moscow State Institute of International Relations

Oleg Viktorovich Krivonogov (Russian: Олег Викторович Кривоногов; 27 July 1938 – 7 May 2021) was a Soviet and Russian diplomat. He served in various diplomatic roles from 1961 onwards, and was Ambassador of Russia to Luxembourg between 1997 and 2001.

== Career ==
Krivonogov was born on 27 July 1938 in Moscow, then part of the Russian Soviet Federative Socialist Republic, in the Soviet Union. He studied at Moscow State Institute of International Relations, graduating in 1961, and entering the diplomatic service. His first post with the Ministry of Foreign Affairs was as a duty assistant at the Soviet embassy in Cambodia. On his return to the USSR in 1964 he was appointed third secretary of the Ministry's South-East Asia Department, holding this post until 1967, when he became the third secretary of the USSR's Permanent Mission to the United Nations Office and other international organizations in Geneva. He was attached to the mission until 1972, over which period he advanced to the post of second secretary.

Krivonogov was recalled to the USSR in 1972, and became first secretary and counselor of the Ministry's Department of International Economic Organizations. He held this position until 1978, when he became first secretary and counselor at the Soviet Union's embassy in France. His next posting, on his return to the USSR in 1983, was as head of a sector, then deputy head, of the Ministry's First European Department. This appointment was followed by his return to France as minister counselor in the embassy in 1987. He was in post during the dissolution of the Soviet Union in 1991, following which he represented the interests of the Russian Federation. He served in this role until 1993. He then returned to Russia and in 1994 was appointed director of the Russian Ministry of Foreign Affairs's First European Department. On 10 November 1995, he was appointed to the diplomatic rank of ambassador extraordinary and plenipotentiary. This was followed by his appointment, on 6 September 1997, as ambassador of Russia to Luxembourg. He held this post until 9 November 2001, at which point he retired.

Over the course of his career, Krivonogov was awarded the Medal "For Labour Valour" and the Medal "In Commemoration of the 850th Anniversary of Moscow". Krivonogov died on 7 May 2021. His obituary by the Russian Ministry of Foreign Affairs described him as "a bright, wonderful person, an extraordinary leader, a talented diplomat, a wonderful professional, an excellent mentor, a reliable and loyal comrade."
