= Andrey Denisov =

Russian diplomat

- Андрей Денисов
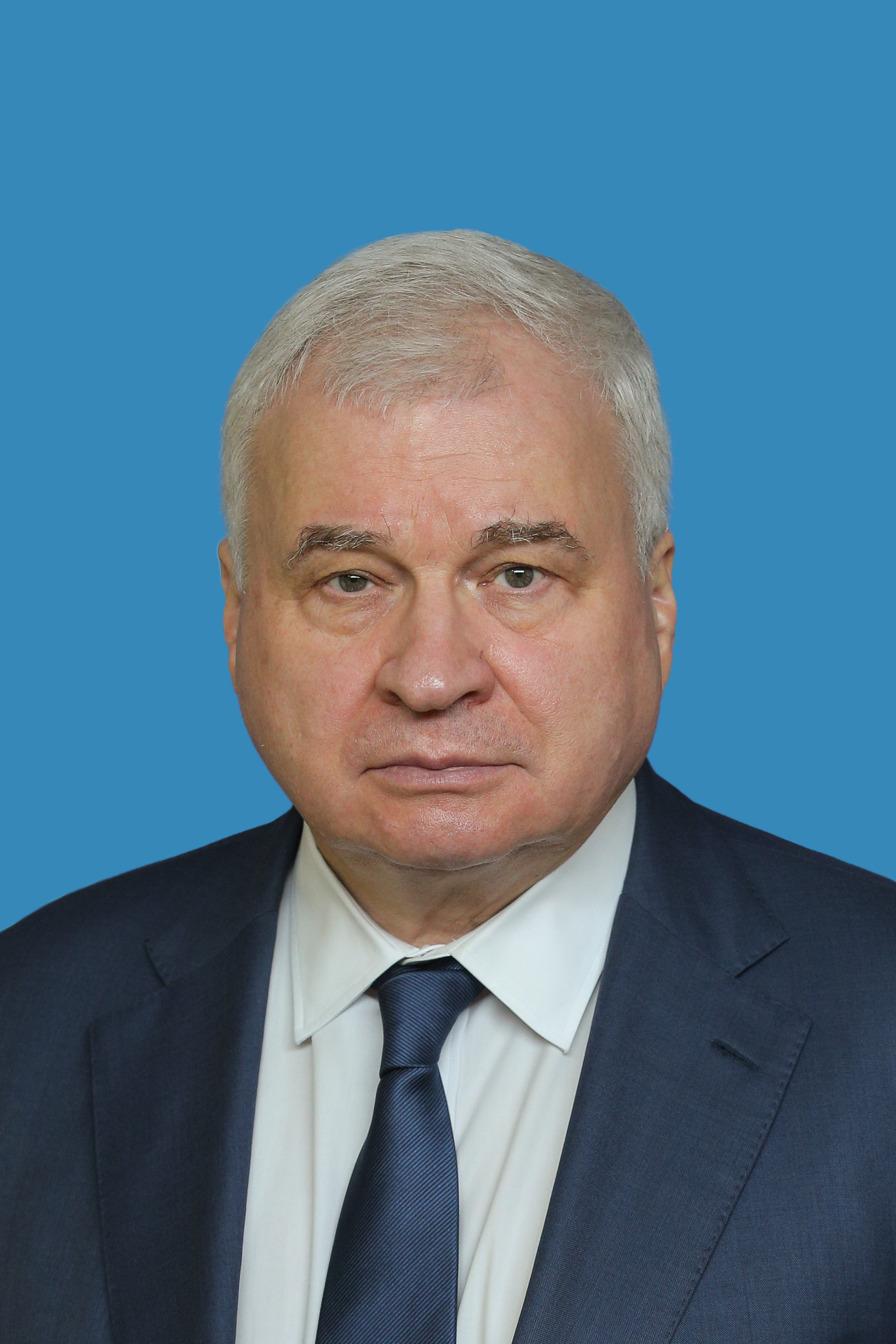
- Denisov in 2022

Senator from Saratov Oblast
- Incumbent
- Assumed office 16 September 2022
- Preceded by: Sergei Arenin

Russian Ambassador to China
- In office 22 April 2013 – 13 September 2022
- President: Vladimir Putin
- Prime Minister: Dmitriy Medvedev; Mikhail Mishustin
- Preceded by: Sergei Razov
- Succeeded by: Igor Morgulov

Russian Ambassador to the United Nations
- In office 12 July 2004 – 8 April 2006
- President: Vladimir Putin
- Prime Minister: Mikhail Kasyanov; Mikhail Fradkov
- Preceded by: Sergey Lavrov
- Succeeded by: Vitaly Churkin

Personal details
- Born: Andrey Ivanovich Denisov; October 3, 1952 (age 74) Kharkov, Ukrainian SSR, Soviet Union
- Education: Moscow State Institute of International Relations
- Occupation: Diplomat

Andrey Ivanovich Denisov (Russian: Андре́й Ива́нович Дени́сов; born October 3, 1952) is a Russian diplomat and politician, who served as the Russian Ambassador to China from April 22, 2013 to September 13, 2022 and Russian Ambassador to the United Nations from July 12, 2004 to April 6, 2006. He is fluent in Chinese, as well as English, apart from his native language. Since September 2022 he has been the Senator from Saratov Oblast on the Federation Council.

== Career timeline ==
- From 1973 to 1981, he was translator, as well as an economic and trade representative of the Soviet Union in China.
- From 1981 to 1991, Expert of the International Department of the Central Committee of the CPSU in the People's Republic of China.
- From 1992 to 1997, he served as a senior counselor at the Russian Embassy in China.
- During the period of 1997 to 2000, he was the Director of the Economic Cooperation Department of the Ministry of Foreign Affairs of Russia.
- During that time, he concurrently served as a member of the administrative board of the Ministry of Foreign Affairs of Russia.
- From May 2000 to December 2001, he was the Russian Ambassador to Egypt.
- From December 2001 to July 2004, he was the Deputy Minister of Foreign Affairs.
- From 2004 to 2006, he was the Permanent Representative of the Russian Federation to the United Nations.
- From 2006 to 2013, he was the First Deputy Foreign Minister of the Russian Federation.
- From 2013 to 2022, he was Ambassador Extraordinary and Plenipotentiary of the Russian Federation to the People's Republic of China.
- Since 2022 — senator from the executive branch of the Saratov region.

== Sanctions ==
Sanctioned by Canada under the Special Economic Measures Act (S.C. 1992, c. 17) in relation to the Russian invasion of Ukraine for Grave Breach of International Peace and Security. and in December 2022 the EU sanctioned Andrey Denisov in relation to the 2022 Russian invasion of Ukraine.

== Awards and honors ==
- Order of Merit to the Fatherland, 3rd class (21 March 2022)
- Order of Merit to the Fatherland, 4th class (9 October 2007)
- Order of Honour (29 October 2010)
- Order of Friendship (30 December 2012)
- Medal "For Merit in Perpetuating the Memory of the Fallen Defenders of the Fatherland" (2008)
- Russian Federation Presidential Certificate of Honour (29 September 2008)
- Honorary Diploma of the Government of the Russian Federation (18 September 2002)
- Gratitude of the President of the Russian Federation (3 April 2008)

== Footnotes ==
Diplomatic posts
| Preceded by Sergey Arenin | Senator from Saratov Oblast; 2022–present | Succeeded by Incumbent |
| Preceded by Sergey Razov | Russian Ambassador to China; 2013–2022 | Succeeded by Igor Morgulov |
| Preceded by Sergey Lavrov | Permanent Representative of Russia to the United Nations; 2004–2006 | Succeeded by Vitaly Churkin |
