= Nikolay Afanasevsky =

Russian diplomat

- Николай Афанасьевский
- Afanasevsky in 1997

Russian Ambassador to Poland
- In office March 2002 – 23 June 2005
- President: Vladimir Putin
- Preceded by: Sergey Razov
- Succeeded by: Vladimir Grinin

Russian Ambassador to France
- In office 18 December 1998 – 20 February 2002
- President: Boris Yeltsin; Vladimir Putin
- Preceded by: Yuri Ryzhov
- Succeeded by: Aleksandr Avdeyev

Russian Ambassador to Belgium
- In office 24 June 1990 – 3 October 1994
- President: Mikhail Gorbachev; Boris Yeltsin
- Preceded by: Feliks Bogdanov
- Succeeded by: Vitaly Churkin

Personal details
- Born: October 1, 1940 Moscow, Russian SFSR, Soviet Union
- Died: June 23, 2005 (aged 64)
- Resting place: Troyekurovskoye Cemetery
- Education: Moscow State Institute of International Relations

Nikolay Nikolaevich Afanasevsky (Russian: Николай Николаевич Афанасьевский; 1 October 1940 – 23 June 2005) was a Russian diplomat.

Born in Moscow, Afanasevsky graduated from the Moscow State Institute of International Relations in 1964 and went on to work in various diplomatic posts in the central offices of the Ministry of Foreign Affairs and abroad.

From 1990 to 1992, he was the ambassador of the Soviet Union in Belgium and continued as the Russian ambassador until 1994. He served as ambassador to France from January 1999 to March 2002, and was appointed as ambassador of Russia to Poland from March 2002 until his death in Warsaw on 23 June 2005.
