= Anatoly Antonov =

Russian diplomat (born 1955)

- Анатолий Антонов
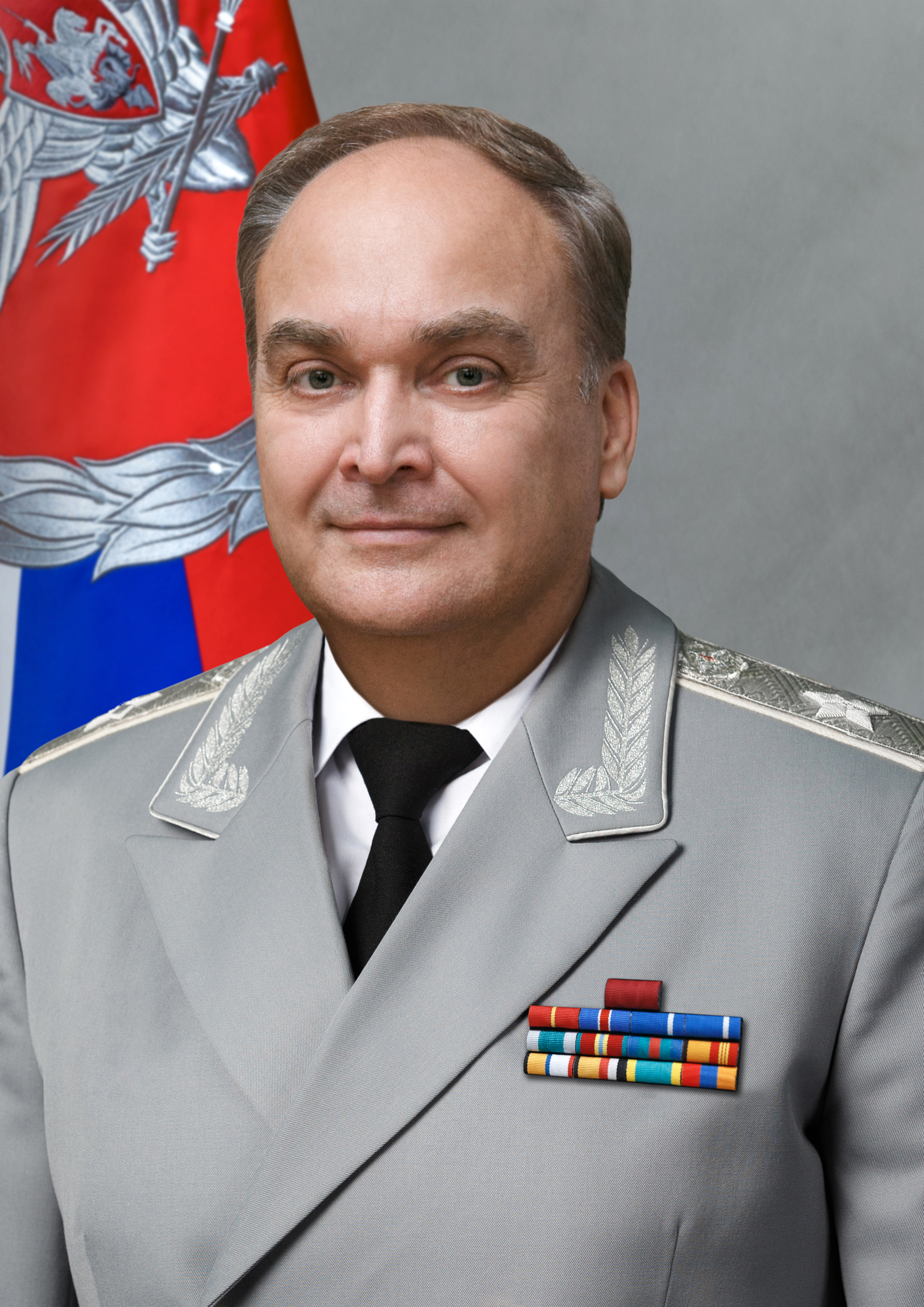
- Antonov in 2014

Ambassador of Russia to the United States
- In office 9 September 2017 – 10 October 2024
- President: Vladimir Putin
- Preceded by: Sergey Kislyak
- Succeeded by: Alexander Darchiev

Deputy Minister of Foreign Affairs
- In office 28 December 2016 – 21 August 2017
- Minister: Sergey Lavrov

Deputy Minister of Defence
- In office 2 February 2011 – 28 December 2016
- Minister: Sergey Shoigu

Personal details
- Born: Anatoly Ivanovich Antonov; 15 May 1955 (age 71) Omsk, Russian SFSR, Soviet Union
- Education: Moscow State Institute of International Relations
- Awards: Merit for Fatherland (4th grade); Order of Honour

Military service
- Allegiance: Soviet Union; Russia
- Branch/service: Russian Armed Forces
- Years of service: 1990—present
- Rank: 1st class Active State Councillor of the Russian Federation

Anatoly Ivanovich Antonov (Russian: Анатoлий Ивaнович Антoнов, IPA: [ɐnɐˈtolʲɪj ɪˈvanəvʲɪtɕ ɐnˈtonəf]; born 15 May 1955) is a Russian military official and diplomat who served as the Ambassador of Russia to the United States from 2017 to 2024. He was appointed by presidential decree on 21 August 2017, succeeding Sergey Kislyak, and took up his post in Washington, D.C. on 1 September. He was previously a Deputy Minister of Defence and Deputy Minister of Foreign Affairs.

He has the civilian service rank of 1st class Active State Councillor of the Russian Federation. Since 2015, he has been under sanctions of the European Union and Canada, in response to Russia's military intervention in Ukraine. He has a reputation for being a tough negotiator and a hardliner.

== Early life and education ==
Antonov was born on 15 May 1955 in Omsk, USSR. In 1978, Antonov graduated from the Moscow State Institute of International Relations (MGIMO), and in 1983 received a master's degree.

In 2012, he earned his doctorate of political science from the Institute of World Economy and International Relations in Moscow. His doctoral dissertation was entitled Controlling nuclear weapons as a factor in ensuring national and international security. He is fluent in English and Burmese.

== Career ==
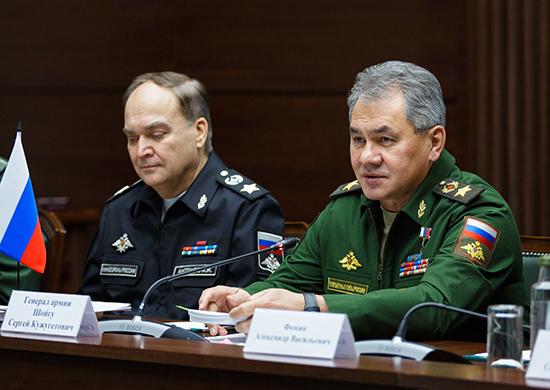
Antonov with Russian Defense Minister Sergei Shoigu in 2016

Antonov began his diplomatic career after earning his undergraduate degree in 1978. He spent the next 30 years at the Soviet Ministry of Foreign Affairs and its successor, the Russian Ministry of Foreign Affairs, where his area of speciality was control of nuclear, chemical and biological weapons. In 2004, he was appointed Director of the Department for Security and Disarmament.

On 2 February 2011, he was promoted by a Presidential Decree to become Deputy Minister of Defence of the Russian Federation.

As Deputy Minister of Defense, he was personally sanctioned by the European Union following Russia's military intervention in Ukraine. He had accused NATO in December 2014 of turning Ukraine into a "frontline of confrontation" with Russia.

On 28 December 2016, he was appointed Deputy Minister of Foreign Affairs.

In March 2017, he was named as one of the candidates for the post of Permanent Representative of Russia to the United Nations, after the death of Vitaly Churkin. However, in the end, it was decided to appoint Vasily Nebenzya to this post.

== Ambassador to the United States ==
=== Nomination and confirmation ===
Antonov is considered a hardliner against the West, earning him a reputation as a "Bull Terrier." In early autumn 2016, he was considered to be the next Russian Ambassador to the United States as the Kremlin assumed that Hillary Clinton would win the presidential election and, therefore, bilateral relations would remain strained. However, despite the fact that Donald Trump won the election, Antonov was still chosen to take over the post from Sergey Kislyak, who had been the ambassador since 2008. In February 2017, Antonov was named the main candidate for this post. On 11 May 2017, the Russian Foreign Ministry formally submitted Antonov to the Federal Assembly, which voted to endorse him as ambassador on 18 May following a closed session of the State Duma's foreign policy committee.

On 21 August 2017, Vladimir Putin formally appointed Antonov as the Ambassador of Russia to the United States by presidential decree.

=== Term ===
Antonov was recalled to Moscow on 17 March 2021 after US President Joe Biden called Putin a "killer." The decision to return Antonov to Washington, D.C. was made following the results of the 2021 Russia–United States summit.

On 20 February 2022, Antonov denied that Russia was planning an invasion of Ukraine.

After the Russian invasion of Ukraine, Antonov has since rejected the notion that Russia's invasion was failing, condemned rising "Russophobia," and lamented a post-Soviet era in which Russia was "naive", trusted the West, and watched its stature decline.

In February 2023, Antonov claimed that the U.S. government was attempting to demonise Russia and "fuel the Ukrainian crisis" by accusing Moscow of crimes against humanity.

Antonov was relieved of duty on 10 October 2024, with a replacement not yet named at the time. In a letter dated 29 June, Antonov wrote that his "assignment [was] coming to an end".

== Diplomatic Rank and Civil Service Class ==
Ambassador Extraordinary and Plenipotentiary (July 12, 2007).

Active State Councillor of the Russian Federation, 1st class (January 27, 2014).

== Awards ==
- Order "For Merit to the Fatherland" IV class
- Order of Alexander Nevsky
- Order of Military Merit
- Order of Honour (twice)
- Order of Friendship
- Medal "For the Return of Crimea"
- Jubilee Medal "70 Years of the Armed Forces of the USSR"
- Medal "Participant of the military operation in Syria"
- Medal "For strengthening combat Commonwealth"
- Medal "For distinction in military service" I class
- Medal "For distinction in military service" II class
- Medal "For distinction in military service" III class

Diplomatic posts
Preceded by Sergey Kislyak	Russian Ambassador to the United States; 21 August 2017 – 10 October 2024	Succeeded by Alexander Darchiev
