= Viktor Avilov (diplomat) =

Soviet diplomat

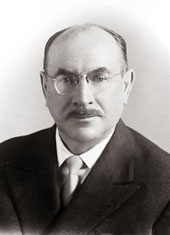
Viktor Ivanovich Avilov

Viktor Ivanovich Avilov (Russian: Виктор Иванович Авилов) (May 1, 1900 – 24 April 1997) was a Soviet diplomat.

Avilov graduated from Saratov University in 1928 and went on to study at the Higher Diplomatic School of the People's Commissariat of Foreign Affairs. After graduation, he went on to work at the People's Commissariat of Foreign Affairs.

After serving as Adviser to the Soviet embassy in Paris, he was Ambassador of the Soviet Union to Belgium, in concurrency to Luxembourg from 24 January 1953 to 9 October 1958.

Returning to Moscow at the end of his mission, where he joined the Press Department of the Ministry of Foreign Affairs, he was appointed as Ambassador of the Soviet Union to Austria, and held this position from 16 June 1960 until 30 June 1965.
