= Vitaly Churkin =

Russian diplomat (1952–2017)

- Виталий Чуркин
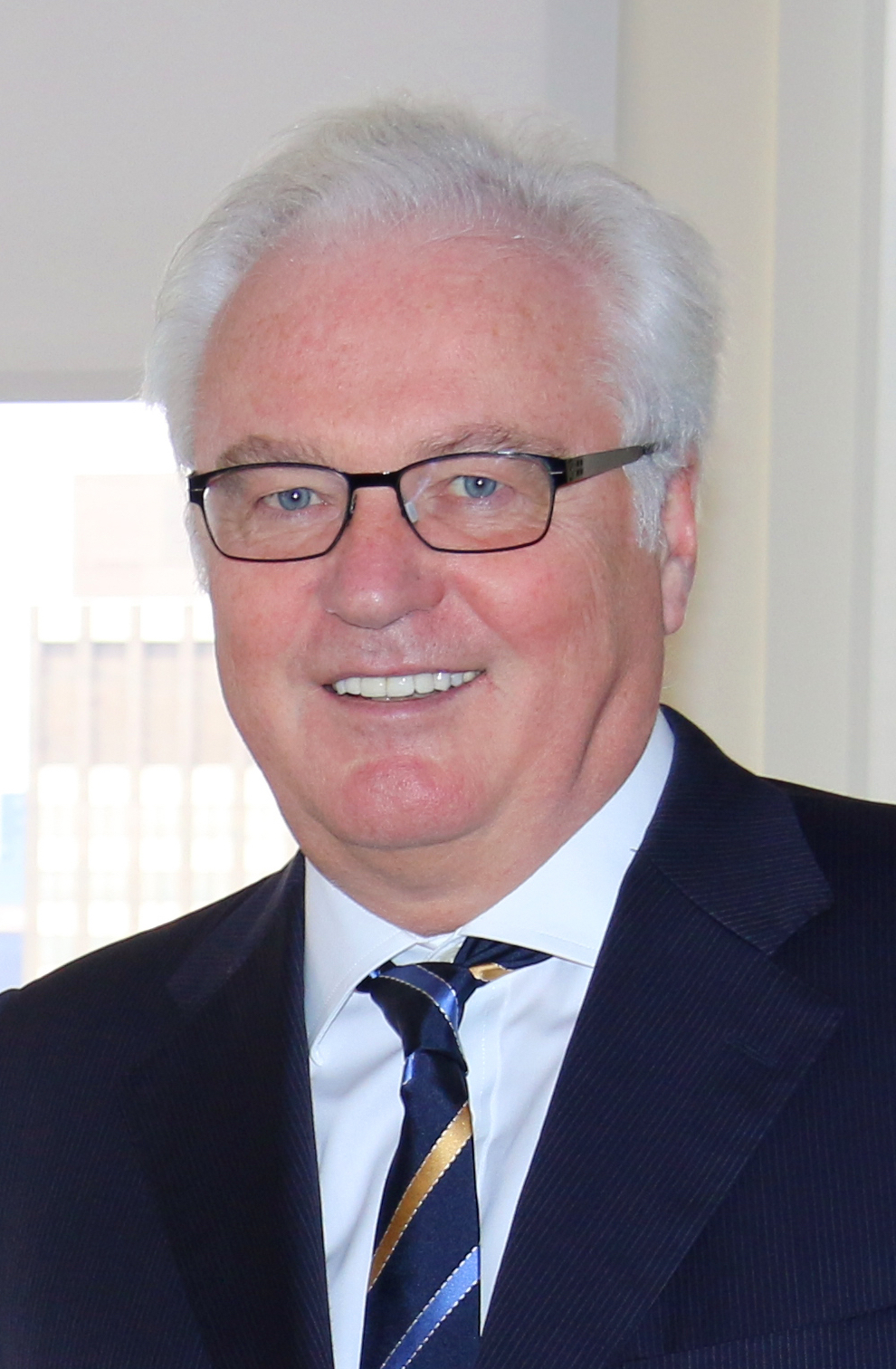
- Churkin in 2015

Ambassador of Russia to the United Nations
- In office 1 May 2006 – 20 February 2017
- President: Vladimir Putin; Dmitry Medvedev; Vladimir Putin
- Preceded by: Andrey Denisov
- Succeeded by: Vasily Nebenzya

Ambassador of Russia to Canada
- In office 23 August 1998 – 5 June 2003
- President: Boris Yeltsin; Vladimir Putin
- Preceded by: Alexander Belonogov
- Succeeded by: Georgiy Mamedov

Ambassador of Russia to Belgium
- In office 3 October 1994 – 25 February 1998
- President: Boris Yeltsin
- Preceded by: Sergey Kislyak
- Succeeded by: Nikolay Afanasevsky

Personal details
- Born: 21 February 1952 Moscow, Russian SFSR, Soviet Union
- Died: 20 February 2017 (aged 64) New York City, U.S.
- Education: Moscow State Institute of International Relations; Diplomatic Academy of the Ministry of Foreign Affairs of the Soviet Union
- Awards: Order "For Merit to the Fatherland"; Order of Courage; Order of Honour; Order of the Serbian Flag

Vitaly Ivanovich Churkin (Note: In this name that follows East Slavic naming customs, the patronymic is Ivanovich and the family name is Churkin.) (Russian: Виталий Иванович Чуркин, IPA: [vʲɪˈtalʲɪj ɪˈvanəvʲɪtɕ ˈtɕurkʲɪn]; 21 February 1952 – 20 February 2017) was a Russian diplomat. He served as Russia's Permanent Representative to the United Nations from 2006 until his death in 2017. Previously he was Ambassador-at-Large at the Ministry of Foreign Affairs of the Russian Federation (2003–2006), Ambassador to Canada (1998–2003), Ambassador to Belgium and Liaison Ambassador to NATO and WEU (1994–1998), Deputy Foreign Minister and Special Representative of the President of the Russian Federation to the talks on Former Yugoslavia (1992–1994), and Director of the Information Department of the Ministry of Foreign Affairs of the USSR/Russian Federation (1990–1992).

Churkin was fluent in English, French and Mongolian. As a child actor, he starred in three films The Blue Notebook, Nol tri, and A Mother's Heart.

== Early life and career ==
Vitaly Churkin as Kolya Yemelyanov and Mikhail Kuznetsov as Vladimir Lenin in the 1963 Soviet film The Blue Notebook.

Churkin was born in Moscow. In 1963, at age 11, he played Kolya Yemelyanov in the Lev Kulidzhanov film The Blue Notebook, about Vladimir Lenin. In 1964, he acted in a movie, Nol tri, about paramedics. In 1967, he played a peasant boy, Fedka, in Mark Donskoy's movie, A Mother's Heart, about Vladimir Lenin, and then he stopped his artistic career to concentrate on English language studies.

He graduated from the Moscow State Institute of International Relations in 1974, and began working for them then, and he received a PhD in History from the USSR Diplomatic Academy in 1981. Subsequently, he was Director of the Information Department of the Ministry of Foreign Affairs of the Soviet Union and the Russian Federation. He also served as a spokesman for the Russian Foreign Ministry, and he was Deputy Foreign Minister from 1992 to 1994.

Vitaly Churkin, with support from Yuri Dubinin, is known to have organized future U.S. President Donald Trump's first visit to the Soviet Union in July 1987. (Note: In January 1986, Dubinin sent Donald Trump a message in which Dubinin stated that "the leading Soviet agency for international tourism, Goskomturist, is interested in creating a joint project for the construction and management of a large hotel in Moscow." Goskomturist (Russian: Госкомтурист) or Intourist was run by the KGB.) (Note: After Donald Trump traveled to Russia and visited Moscow and St. Petersburg in 1987, he began organizing sporting events through representatives with Vladimir Putin and Sergey Chemezov's Sovintersport which was a portmanteau for Soviet, International, Export, and Sport and held a monopoly on Soviet sports athletes competing in the West. One event included the former Tour de Jersey which became the Tour de Trump and included Soviet bicyclists with their KGB agent Sergey Chemizov.)

Churkin was Russia's Ambassador to Belgium from 1994 to 1998, and the Ambassador to Canada from 1998 to 2003. Subsequently, he served as Ambassador-at-Large at the Ministry of Foreign Affairs from 2003 to 2006. He replaced Andrey Denisov as the Permanent Representative to the United Nations on 1 May 2006, when he presented his credentials to the Secretary-General of the United Nations, Kofi Annan. He was the Chairman of the Senior Officials of the Arctic Council.

== Chernobyl testimony ==
Churkin won some notoriety in 1986 when, as a 34-year-old second secretary, he was selected by Soviet Ambassador Anatoly Dobrynin to testify before the United States Congress on the Soviet man-made Chernobyl disaster. This was reported as the first time in history a Soviet official had testified before a Congressional committee of the U.S. House of Representatives. The choice of Churkin, then a relatively junior diplomat, was due to his reputation as the most fluent English-speaker in the Soviet embassy; media reported he possessed "an array of English slang". Churkin's performance was filled with denials, deflections and whataboutist rhetoric, which led to his being parodied in Mark Alan Stamaty's Washingtoon, a political cartoon series in The Washington Post, as Vitaly "Charmyourpantsoff".

== Actions as a United Nations representative ==
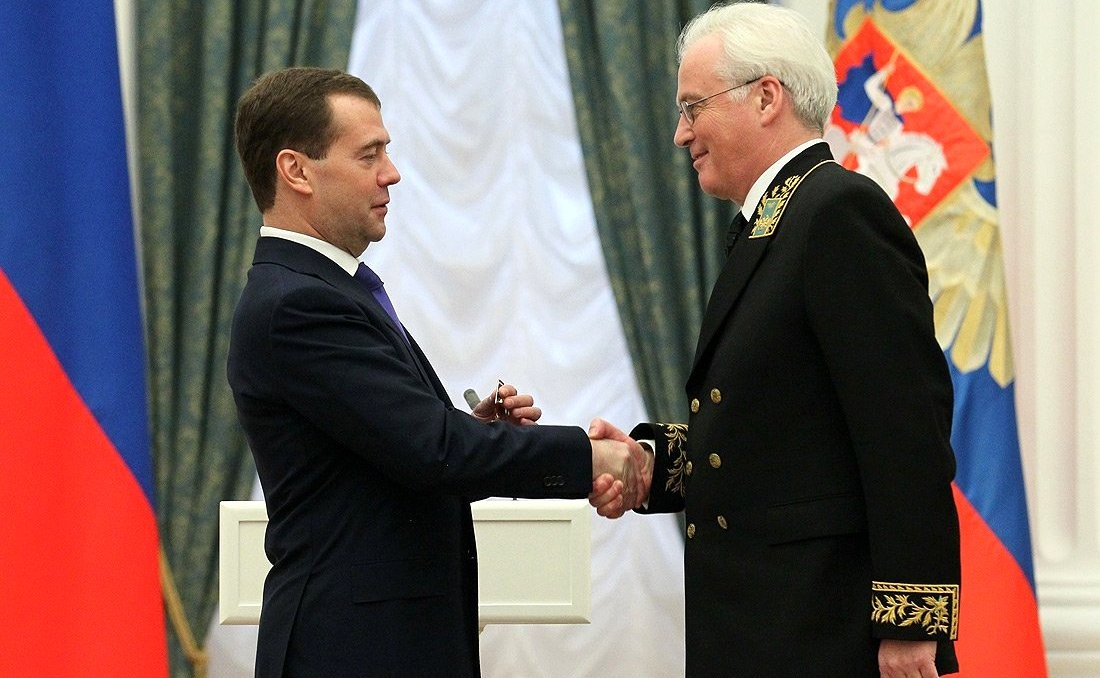
Churkin awarded the order "For Merit to the Fatherland" IV class, 20 February 2012

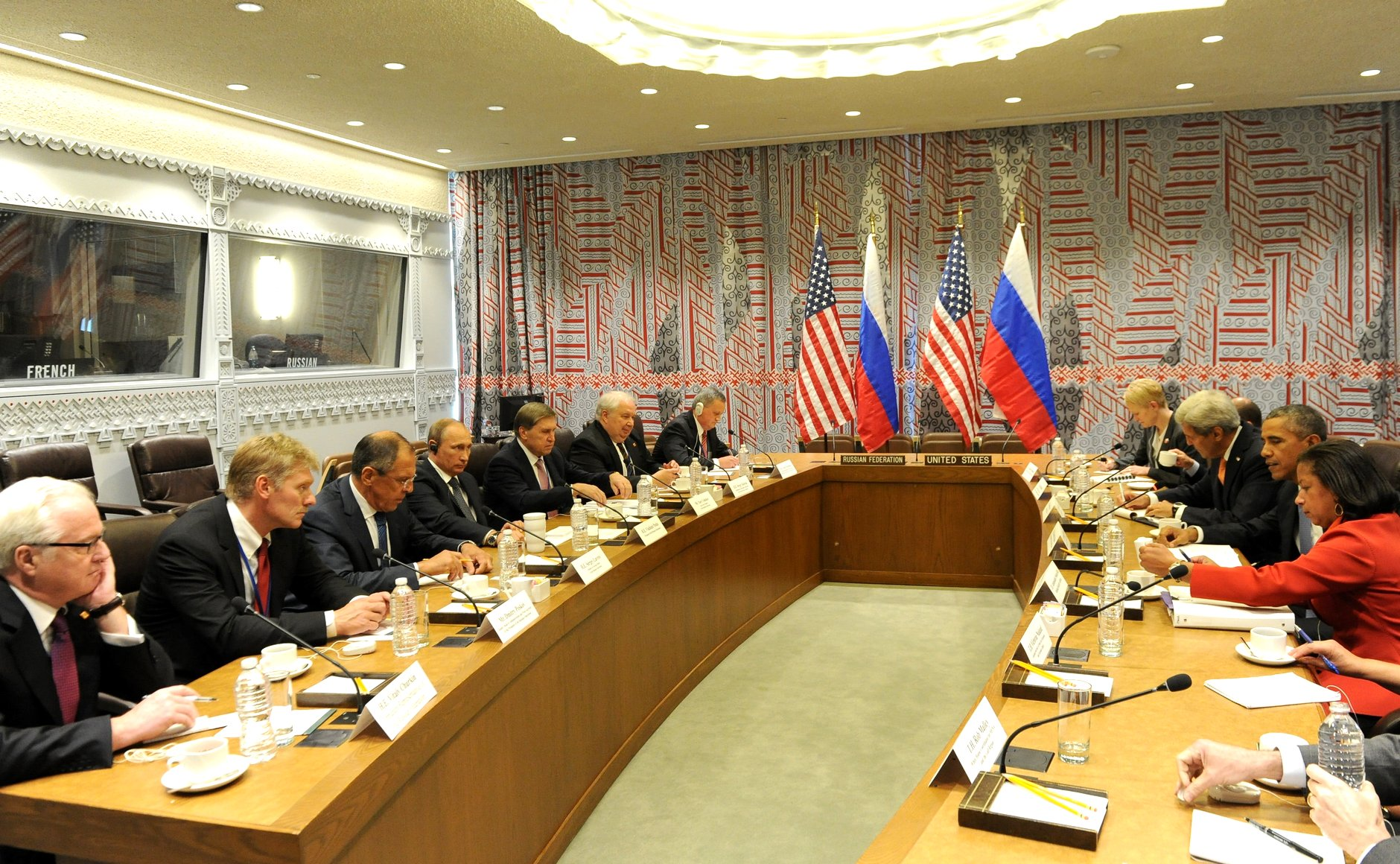
Barack Obama meets with Vladimir Putin, Churkin and other Russian representatives to discuss Syria and ISIL, 29 September 2015

=== Georgia ===
In 2008, during the Russo-Georgian War, Churkin proposed a draft resolution imposing a weapons embargo on Georgia. The draft was criticized by the United States who saw it as "a ploy to divert attention from the fact Moscow had yet to pull out of Georgian territory outside two breakaway regions". The draft was officially introduced on 9 September 2009, and no actions were taken on it.

=== Crimea ===
On 13 March 2014, Churkin was questioned by Arseniy Yatsenyuk on whether Crimea had a right to hold a referendum which would determine Crimea's status as a part of either Russia or Ukraine.

On 20 March 2014, amid the impending annexation of Crimea by Russia, he responded to the CNN anchor Christiane Amanpour's criticism of him and his daughter, a state-funded Russia Today journalist Anastasia Churkina.

=== Iran ===
On 25 June 2014, Churkin commented on the first round of talks regarding the Iranian nuclear program, saying that the talks between the P5+1 states and Iran were successful. The talks were held by him and six other diplomats in Vienna from 16 to 20 June and he said that the second round would begin on 2 July and end thirteen days later.

=== Iraq ===
On 12 June 2014, Churkin briefed on the crisis in Baghdad, Iraq, saying that there was no threat to his colleague Nickolay Mladenov, who is the head of the UN's political mission in that country. He also noted that the violence there erupts further north.

=== Srebrenica massacre ===
During the Yugoslav Wars—in the Srebrenica massacre—about 7,500 people were killed by Bosnian Serb troops in a span of eleven days. It was later found to be an act of genocide by the International Court of Justice. The UK sponsored a resolution, the purpose of which was to commemorate the twentieth anniversary of the massacres in Srebrenica and that would have emphasized acceptance of those tragic events as genocide as a prerequisite for national reconciliation in Bosnia and Herzegovina. The Russian Federation, after Serbian President Tomislav Nikolić sent a letter to Russian President Vladimir Putin, was the only country on the security council that was against the resolution (China and three other countries abstained): Churkin issued a veto on his country's behalf at the UN Security Council on 8 July 2015.

== Career timeline ==
- 1974 – Graduated from the Moscow State Institute of International Relations
- 1974 – Joined the USSR Foreign Ministry
- 1974–1979 – Staff member of the USSR delegation to the Strategic Arms Limitation Talks
- 1979–1982 – Third secretary, US desk, USSR Foreign Ministry
- 1981 – PhD in history from the USSR Diplomatic Academy
- 1982–1987 – Second, first secretary, USSR Embassy in Washington DC
- 1985 – Undertook a speaking tour of United States universities invited by USGov
- 1987–1989 – Staff member, International Department, CPSU Central Committee
- 1989–1990 – Special adviser to the USSR Minister of Foreign Affairs
- 1990–1991 – Director, Information Department, Spokesman of the USSR Foreign Ministry
- 1992–1994 – Deputy Foreign Minister of the Russian Federation, Special Representative of the President of the Russian Federation to the talks on Former Yugoslavia
- 1994–1998 – Ambassador of Russia to Belgium, Liaison Ambassador to NATO and WEU
- 1998–2003 – Ambassador of Russia to Canada
- 2003 – April 2006 – Ambassador-at-Large, MFA, Chairman of Senior Arctic Officials, Arctic Council, Senior Official of Russia at the Barents/Euro-Arctic Council
- 8 April 2006 – Permanent Representative of Russia to the United Nations, Representative of the Russian Federation at the UN Security Council Diplomatic rank — Ambassador Extraordinary and Plenipotentiary (1990)

== Death ==
Churkin died in New York City on 20 February 2017, on the eve of his 65th birthday. The immediate cause was heart failure, according to Russian diplomat Sergei Ordzhonikidze. The Russian Foreign Ministry noted that Churkin died while at work and expressed condolences to Churkin's family. India's Permanent Representative to the UN, Syed Akbaruddin, also expressed his condolences, calling Churkin a "friend" and a "stalwart diplomat". Former President Barack Obama's UN Ambassador, Samantha Power, tweeted that she was "devastated" and described Churkin as a "diplomatic maestro" who did all he could to bridge U.S.-Russia differences. Britain's ambassador to the UN, Matthew Rycroft, tweeted that he was "absolutely devastated", describing Churkin as "a diplomatic giant & wonderful character". American financier and child sex offender Jeffrey Epstein, with whom Churkin had met several times from 2015 until 2017, sent an email to tech billionaire Peter Thiel stating, "As you read my Russian ambassador friend died. Life is short, start with dessert."

On 21 February 2017, the New York City Medical Examiner's Office released the preliminary results of an autopsy performed on Churkin, which states that the cause of death needed further study, which often indicates the need for toxicology tests. A gag order pursuant to a request of the U.S. State Department and the United States Mission to the United Nations suppressed public disclosure of the cause and manner of death, citing Churkin's posthumous diplomatic immunity; Russia maintained that the information was private and that disclosing details of the autopsy results could hurt his reputation. Churkin was posthumously awarded the Russian Order of Courage on 21 February 2017 and the Order of the Serbian Flag 1st class.

Churkin was the fifth Russian diplomat posted abroad to die unexpectedly, in a remarkably similar fashion, since November 2016, the first such death having occurred on the morning of the U.S. presidential election, 8 November 2016, inside the Russian consulate in NYC – a fact that caused conspiracy theorists to try to detect a pattern. The apparent pattern was followed by a sudden death of Russian ambassador to Sudan Migayas Shirinskiy in the capital Khartoum in August 2017. Hours after Shirinskiy's death, Russia's government-owned news agency TASS published a list of names and brief biographies of senior Russian diplomats (naming five), who had died "of natural causes" "in the past two years" (in fact, since 30 May 2016, the day when Russian Chargés d'affaires ad interim to Ukraine Andrei Vorobyov, aged 57, died suddenly in Moscow), that included Churkin. His death was likewise cited in a list published in early May 2017 by USA Today as one in a series of "dozens of high-profile" Russians' deaths, such as GRU chief Igor Sergun's (January 2016), in "the past three years in Russia and abroad in suspicious circumstances".

== See also ==
- List of current permanent representatives to the United Nations

== Notes ==
Diplomatic posts
Preceded by Nikolay Afanasevsky	Ambassador of Russia to Belgium; 1994–1998	Succeeded by Sergey Kislyak
Preceded by Alexander Belonogov	Ambassador of Russia to Canada; 1998–2003	Succeeded by Georgiy Mamedov
Preceded by Andrey Denisov	Permanent Representative of Russia to the United Nations; 2006–2017	Succeeded by Pyotr Ilichov (acting)
