= Vladimir Sobolev (diplomat) =

Soviet diplomat (1924–2010)

Ambassador of the Soviet Union to Belgium
- In office 8 July 1971 – 30 April 1975
- Preceded by: Fyodor Molochkov
- Succeeded by: Sergey Romanovsky

Ambassador of the Soviet Union to Finland
- In office 11 June 1979 – 17 June 1988
- Preceded by: Vladimir Stepanov
- Succeeded by: Boris Aristov

Personal details
- Born: 1 October 1924 Kainsk, Novonikolayevsk Governorate, RSFSR, Soviet Union
- Died: 23 June 2010 (aged 85) Moscow, Russia
- Party: CPSU

Vladimir Mikhailovich Sobolev (Russian: Владимир Михайлович Соболев; 1 October 1924, Kainsk – 23 June 2010, Moscow) was a Soviet diplomat who worked in the embassy to Algeria, and served as the Soviet Ambassador to Belgium (July 1971 to April 1975) and to Finland (June 1979 to June 1988).

== Awards and honors ==
- Three Orders of the Badge of Honour
- Two Orders of the Red Banner of Labour
- Order of Friendship of Peoples
- Order of the Patriotic War, 1st class
- Order of the Red Banner
