= Igor Morgulov =

Russian diplomat (born 1961)

- Игорь Моргулов
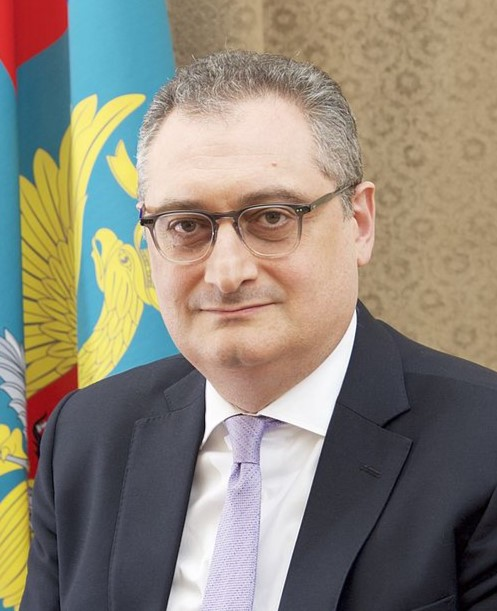
- Morgulov in 2016

Russian Ambassador to China
- Incumbent
- Assumed office September 13, 2022
- President: Vladimir Putin
- Prime Minister: Mikhail Mishustin
- Preceded by: Andrei Denisov

Vice Minister of Foreign Affairs of Russia
- In office December 22, 2011 – September 13, 2022

Personal details
- Born: Igor Vladimirovich Morgulov; 4 May 1961 (age 65) Alma-Ata, Kazakh SSR, Soviet Union (now Almaty, Kazakhstan)
- Education: Moscow State University
- Occupation: Diplomat

Igor Vladimirovich Morgulov (Russian: Игорь Владимирович Моргулов; born May 4, 1961) is a Russian diplomat, who was appointed Russian Ambassador to China in September 2022.

== Diplomatic career ==
In 1983, he graduated from the Institute of Asian and African Countries at Moscow State University. From 1984, he worked in the Ministry of Foreign Trade of the USSR, including the trade representation of the Soviet Union in China.

From 1989 to 1991, he worked as an assistant-translator and senior assistant at the Chinese sector of the International Department of the Central Committee of the CPSU. Following the dissolution of the Soviet Union in 1991, he was assigned to the Foreign Ministry of Russia and held various diplomatic positions in the central office in the ministry, and in diplomatic missions in China, Japan and the United States. From 2005 to 2006, he served as the chief advisor to the First Department of Asia of the Russian Foreign Ministry, which carried responsibilities in dealing relations with China, North Korea, South Korea and Mongolia. In 2006, he was appointed as Minister Counselor of the Russian Embassy in China. From 2009 to 2011, he was the director of the First Asian Department of the Foreign Ministry of Russia.

In December 2011, he was appointed as the Vice Minister of Foreign Affairs of Russia and at the same time, worked as chairman of the interdepartmental commission for ensuring the participation of Russia within the Shanghai Cooperation Organisation. In a 2015 interview with Interfax, he stated that Russia would not hold a dialogue with Japan on the Kuril Islands dispute as it was "settled 70 years ago", but was ready to continue negotiations on a peace treaty between Japan and Russia. In 2018, he was involved in Japan-Russia vice-ministerial level consultations with Vice Minister for Foreign Affairs of Japan Takeyoshi Mori.

On September 13, 2022, President of Russia Vladimir Putin appointed Morgulov as the Russian Ambassador to China, succeeding Andrei Denisov. On October 31, he presented his credentials to the Director-General of the Protocol Department of the Foreign Ministry of China Hong Lei. In an April 2022 interview, during the 2022 Russian invasion of Ukraine, Morgulov stated that the "friendship between Moscow and Beijing was based on overlapping basic interests and that it would not be affected by changes in the external environment."

== Personal life ==
He is married and has two children, and is fluent in English and Chinese.

== Awards and honors ==
- Order of Merit to the Fatherland, 4th class (2022)
- Order of Alexander Nevsky (2020)
- Order of Honour (2013)
- Order of Friendship (2015)
- Medal of the Order "For Merit to the Fatherland", 2nd class (2007)
- Russian Federation Presidential Certificate of Honour (2011)
- Gratitude of the President of the Russian Federation (2011, 2021)
- Gratitude of the Government of the Russian Federation (2009)
- Order of Holy Prince Daniel of Moscow, 3rd class (2021)
