= Sergey Kislyak =

Russian diplomat and politician (born 1950)

- Сергей Кисляк
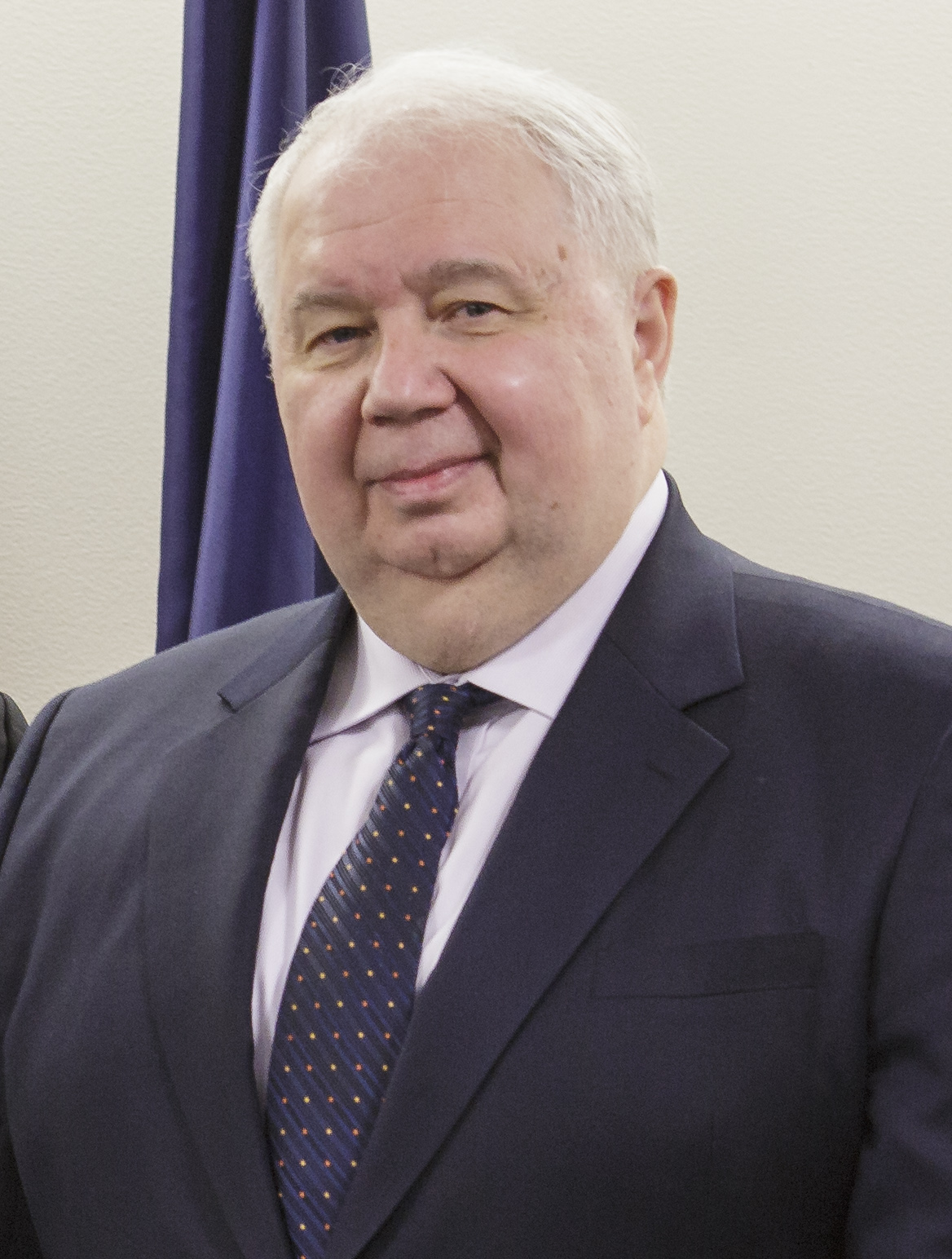
- Kislyak in 2016

Russian Federation Senator from the Republic of Mordovia
- In office 20 September 2017 – September 2026 Serving with Pyotr Tultayev
- Preceded by: Nikolay Petrushkin
- Succeeded by: Andrey Kelin

Russian Ambassador to the United States
- In office 26 July 2008 – 21 August 2017
- President: Dmitry Medvedev; Vladimir Putin
- Preceded by: Yuri Ushakov
- Succeeded by: Anatoly Antonov

Deputy Minister of Foreign Affairs
- In office 2003–2008
- President: Vladimir Putin; Dmitry Medvedev
- Minister: Igor Ivanov; Sergey Lavrov

Russian Ambassador to Belgium
- In office 25 February 1998 – 28 May 2003
- President: Boris Yeltsin
- Preceded by: Vitaly Churkin
- Succeeded by: Vadim Lukov

Personal details
- Born: Sergey Ivanovich Kislyak; Сергей Иванович Кисляк; 7 September 1950 (age 76) Moscow, Soviet Union
- Children: 1
- Education: Moscow Engineering Physics Institute

Sergey Ivanovich Kislyak (Russian: Серге́й Ива́нович Кисля́к, IPA: [sʲɪrˈɡʲej ɪˈvanəvʲɪtɕ kʲɪˈslʲak]; born 7 September 1950) is a Russian senior diplomat and politician. Since September 2017, he has represented Mordovia in the Federation Council, the upper chamber of the Russian legislature. Previously he served as the Ambassador of Russia to the United States from 2008 to 2017. From 2003 to 2008, he was the Deputy Minister of Foreign Affairs, and from 1998 to 2003, he served as the Ambassador of Russia to Belgium and Russia's Head of Mission to NATO.

Dubbed "the diplomat's diplomat" by CNN, Kislyak was Russia's highest level presence in the U.S. during his nine-year tenure in Washington, D.C., a period of increasing political tension between the two countries. Kislyak became a key figure in the investigation of Russian interference in the 2016 United States elections, receiving significant media coverage while denying that Russia was behind the hacking of the Democratic National Committee. However, Kislyak's meetings with advisers to then President-elect Donald Trump became a subject of investigation by U.S. intelligence officials. In May 2017, Trump held a meeting with Kislyak and Sergei Lavrov and disclosed classified information about ISIS, an incident which was leaked to the press and became a scandal.

After nearly a decade in the U.S., Kislyak returned to Moscow in July 2017 and was formally relieved of his duties in August, succeeded by Deputy Minister of Foreign Affairs Anatoly Antonov.

== Early life ==
Kislyak was born in Moscow, to Ukrainian parents. He graduated from the Moscow Engineering Physics Institute in 1973 and the USSR Academy of Foreign Trade in 1977.

== Diplomatic career ==
Kislyak joined the diplomatic service in 1977, working with the Soviet Ministry of Foreign Affairs. From 1981 to 1985, he was the Second Secretary at the Permanent Mission of the Soviet Union to the United Nations in New York City. From 1985 to 1989, Kislyak was the First Secretary, Counsellor at the Embassy of the Soviet Union in Washington, D.C.

From 1989 to 1991, Kislyak was the deputy director of the Department of International Organisations at the Soviet Foreign Ministry. From 1991 to 1993, he was the deputy director of the Department of International Scientific and Technical Cooperation at the Russian Ministry of Foreign Affairs. From 1993 to 1995, Kislyak was the Director of the Department of International Scientific and Technical Cooperation. From 1995 to 1998, he was the Director of the Department of Security Affairs and Disarmament at the Russian Foreign Ministry.

In 1998, Kislyak was the ambassador of Russia to Belgium with a residence in Brussels, and he also served as the Permanent Representative of the Russian Federation to NATO. From 2003 to 2008, Kislyak served as a Deputy Ministry of Foreign Affairs. He was Russia's negotiator on the six-party Iran denuclearization talks prior to his appointment as ambassador to the United States.

=== Ambassador to the United States ===
Kislyak became the ambassador of Russia to the United States on 26 July 2008, when he was appointed by then Russian president Dmitry Medvedev.

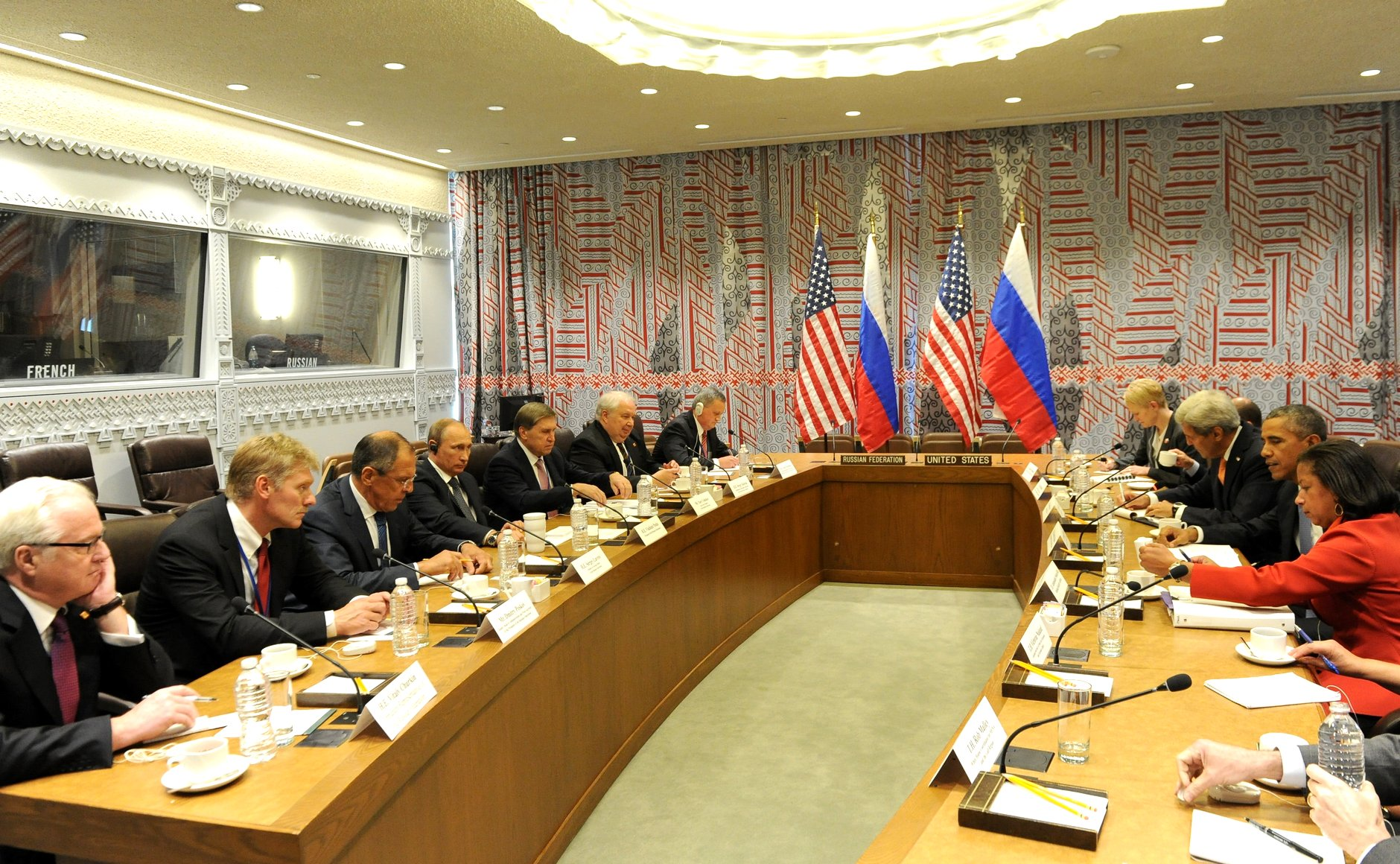
President Barack Obama meets with Vladimir Putin, Sergey Lavrov, Sergey Kislyak and other Russian representatives to discuss Syria and ISIL on September 29, 2015.

For many years, Kislyak held a low profile in the press but socialized in Washington, D.C. diplomatic circles, known for his lavish parties at the Russian compound at Pioneer Point, Maryland. Kislyak has been called an experienced and polished diplomat who is friendly but aggressive in promoting Russian interests. The New York Times called Kislyak "the most prominent, if politically radioactive, ambassador in Washington." According to a Times profile in March 2017, "He has interacted with American officials for decades and been a fixture on the Washington scene for the past nine years, jowly and cordial with an easy smile and fluent if accented English, yet a pugnacity in advocating Russia's assertive policies." According to a profile in Politico, people who know Kislyak describe the ambassador "as intelligent but an unyielding advocate for the Kremlin line."

As the veteran ambassador to the United States, Kislyak became the subject of intense scrutiny and media coverage in 2017 in the wake of allegations that Russia interfered in the 2016 U.S. presidential election, and that he held meetings with top advisers to then president-elect Donald Trump. In February 2017, Michael T. Flynn was forced to resign as National Security Adviser when it emerged he lied about meetings with Kislyak. John Beyrle, the U.S. ambassador to Russia from 2008 to 2012, said that Kislyak is "a professional diplomat, not a politician. I'm sure he's surprised to have acquired such notoriety recently. I'm sure he's probably not enjoying his time in the limelight."

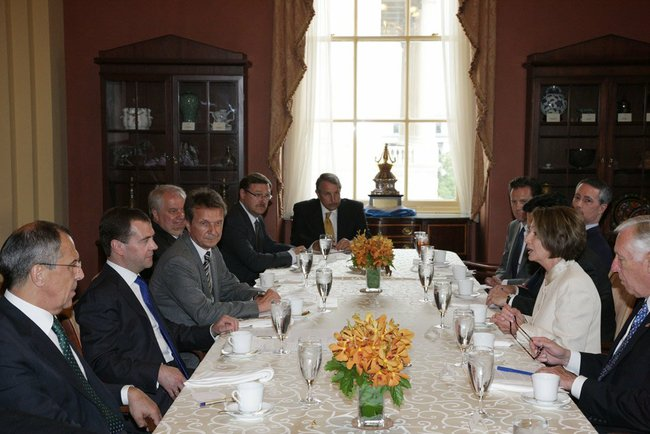
Meeting with Nancy Pelosi and other congressional leaders

On 10 May 2017 immediately after meeting with Henry Kissinger and one day after firing FBI director James Comey, U.S. president Donald Trump invited Kislyak and Sergei Lavrov to meet with him in the Oval Office. This meeting received significant coverage as it was closed to U.S. press, but the Russians brought in a photographer from state agency TASS, and released photos of Trump, Kisylak and Lavrov laughing together. On 15 May, it was revealed that during this meeting, Trump disclosed classified information about ISIL's bomb-making capabilities without taking the appropriate protocols, which was leaked to the press.

In the fall of 2016, replacements for Kislyak were being considered as it was planned for him to end his lengthy tenure in D.C. In May 2017, General Anatoly Antonov, the deputy minister of foreign affairs was approved to succeed him as ambassador to the United States. Antonov, who has been called a "Bull Terrier" because of his reputation as a hardliner, is expected to take a more aggressive approach to negotiations with the United States.

Kislyak returned to Moscow at the end of July 2017. On 21 August 2017, Putin formally released Kislyak from his duties as ambassador by decree of the President of Russia.

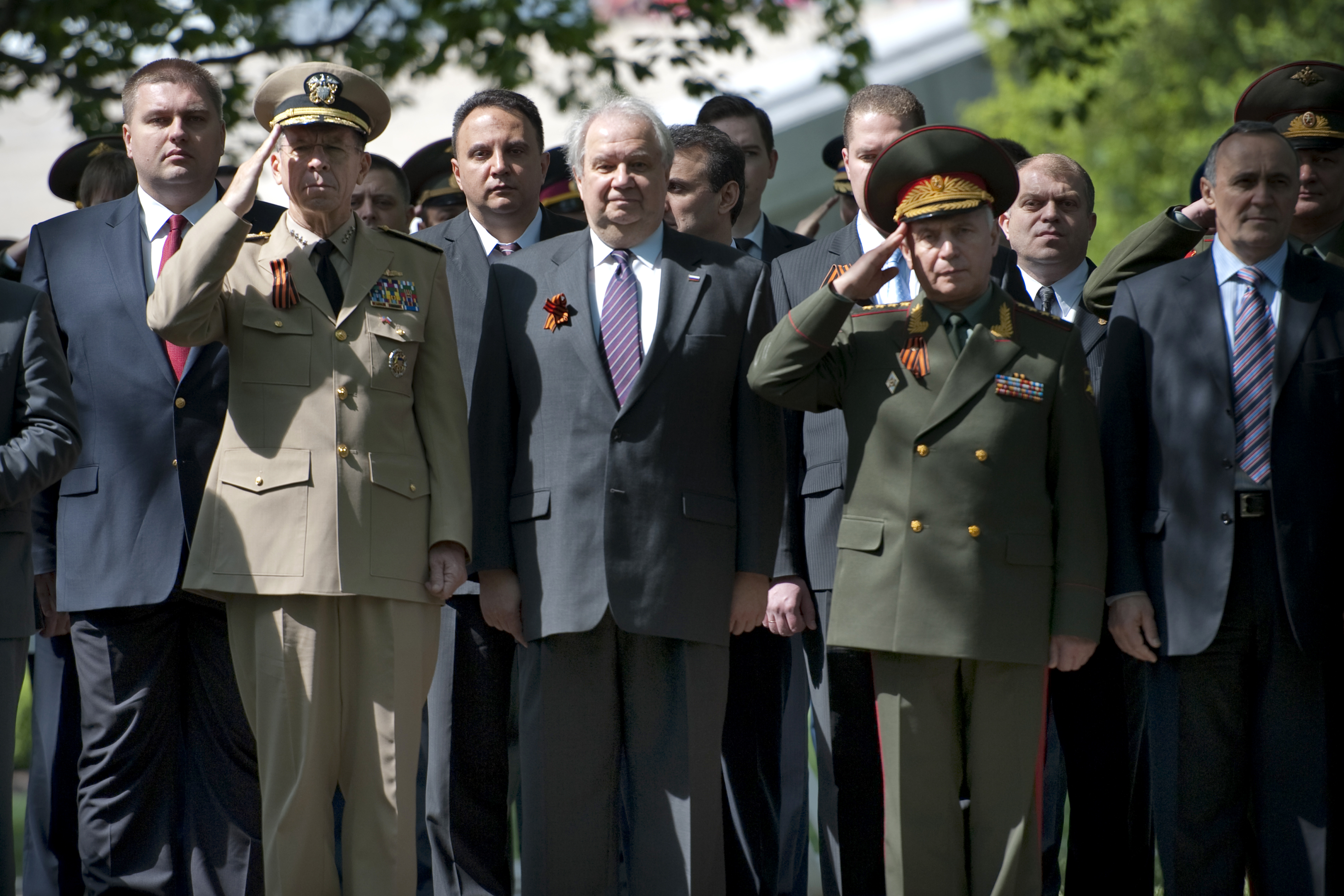
U.S. Navy Adm. Mike Mullen, chairman of the Joint Chiefs of Staff, and Kislyak at Arlington National Cemetery on April 23, 2010

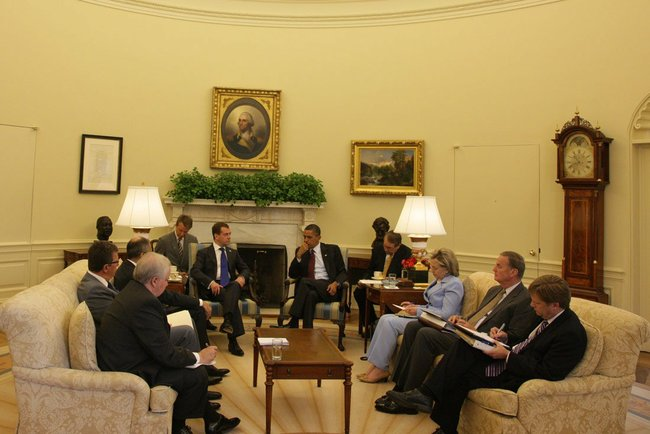
President Obama and Secretary of State Hillary Clinton with Russian president Dmitry Medvedev and Kislyak on June 24, 2010

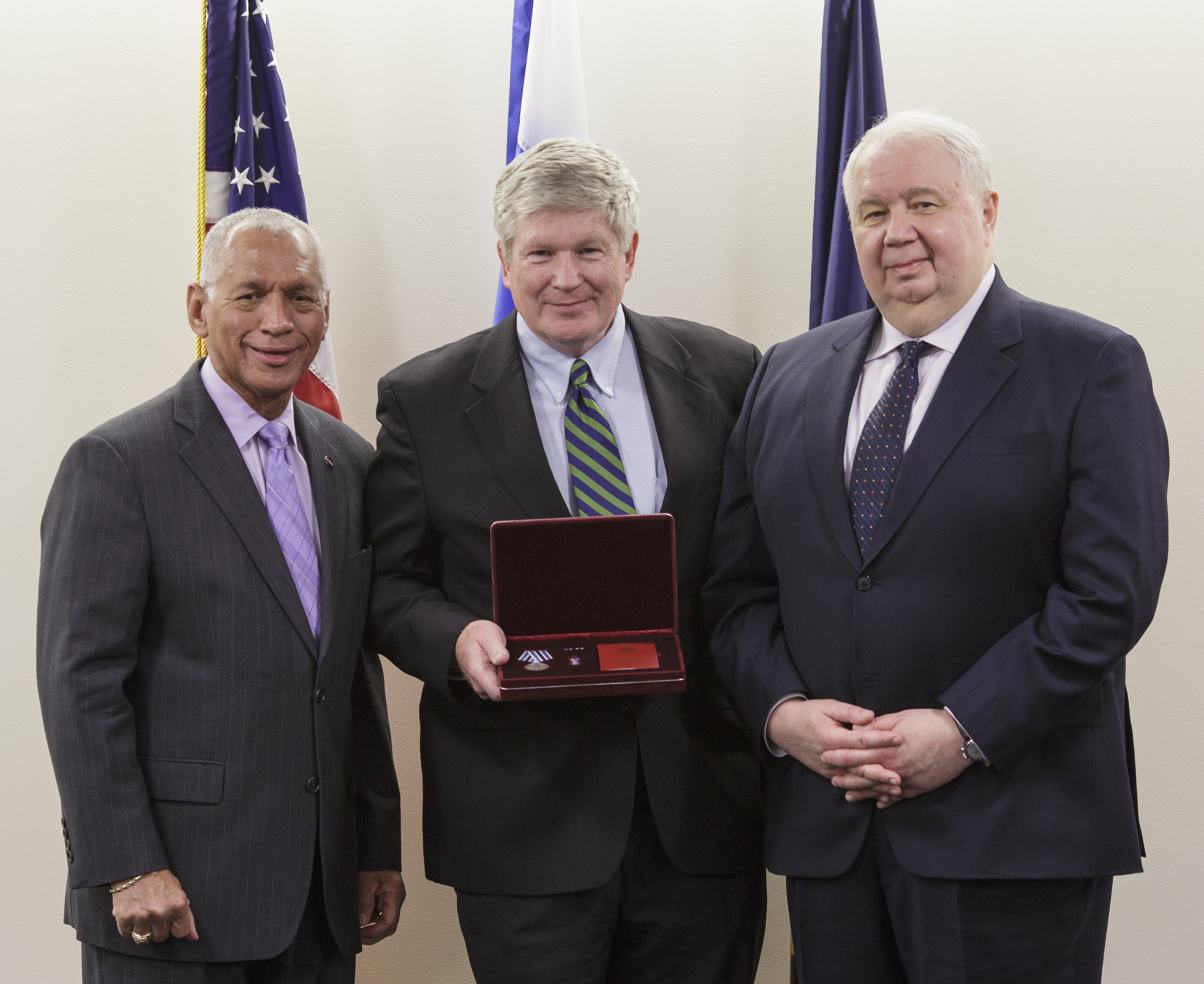
Kislyak, NASA Administrator Charles Bolden and William Shepherd after Shepherd was awarded the Russian Medal "For Merit in Space Exploration", December 2, 2016

==== 2016 US Presidential election controversy ====
Kislyak has emerged as a central figure in the scandal involving Russian interference in the 2016 U.S. presidential election, particularly through his contacts with Donald Trump officials including Jeff Sessions, Michael Flynn and Jared Kushner. Sessions, later the United States Attorney General, denied any contact with Russian officials during the campaign but was forced to recuse himself from the Russian investigation after the Justice Department acknowledged he had spoken with Kislyak twice in 2016.

In July 2016, Kislyak held a "diplomacy conference" at the Republican National Convention in Cleveland, during which his interactions with Trump officials became the subject of denial and controversy. In a speech in October 2016 in Detroit, Kislyak denied ever meeting with anyone involved in the Trump campaign. However, it later emerged that J. D. Gordon and Carter Page had spoken with Kislyak at the RNC. Kislyak did not attend the 2016 Democratic National Convention.

In a November 2016 speech at Stanford University, Kislyak denied that Russia had interfered in the 2016 U.S. elections. In the same speech, Kisylak accused the United States of waging a "huge propaganda campaign against Russia" and stated that the American-Russian relationship was currently at "the worst point in our relations after the end of the Cold War. You've re-entered a policy of containing Russia … You've tried to contain Russia through economic pressure and through sanctions."

On 29 December 2016, the same day that the United States announced new sanctions against Russia for interfering with the election, Kislyak and then-U.S. National Security Advisor designate Michael Flynn had multiple telephone conversations and exchanged text messages. The phone calls are the subject of an investigation by U.S. counterintelligence agents. White House Press Secretary Sean Spicer stated in early January 2017 that the calls related to arranging a conversation between Donald Trump and Vladimir Putin. However, Kislyak's calls were monitored under standard foreign intelligence practice, and it was revealed that Flynn and Kislyak had discussed sanctions. On 13 February 2017, Flynn was forced to resign from his position as National Security Advisor over his communication with Kislyak.

On 1 March 2017, The Washington Post reported that Attorney General Jeff Sessions had spoken twice to Ambassador Kislyak, once in July 2016 and once in September 2016, during Sessions' tenure as US senator on the Senate Armed Services Committee. During Sessions' Senate Judiciary Committee confirmation hearing on 10 January 2017, Sessions was questioned under oath about "possible contacts between members of President Trump's campaign and representatives of Moscow" and expressed no knowledge of such contact. On 2 March, The New York Times later reported that Kislyak met with Flynn and Kushner in December 2016, which the White House said was to establish a diplomatic line of communication with the Trump administration. That same day, Sessions agreed to recuse himself from any involvement with the federal investigation into Russian election interference.

On 26 May 2017, The Washington Post reported that U.S. intelligence officials had, in the course of monitoring Kislyak in December, overheard him discussing a request from Jared Kushner to establish a secret, secure channel to communicate with the Kremlin that would not be monitored by U.S. intelligence. Kislyak was reporting Kushner's request to use "diplomatic facilities in the United States" when it was intercepted by U.S. intelligence. According to the report, "Kislyak reportedly was taken aback by the suggestion of allowing an American to use Russian communications gear at its embassy or consulate — a proposal that would have carried security risks for Moscow as well as the Trump team." The Washington Post said that Russian officials occasionally leak "false information into communication streams it suspects are monitored as a way of sowing misinformation and confusion among U.S. analysts," but that U.S. officials stated it was unclear what Kislyak would have gained by falsely reporting such an encounter at a time when the Kremlin was envisioning improved diplomatic relations under the incoming Trump administration. The New York Times reported that it had confirmed Kislyak's report with three officials.

==== Allegations of espionage ====
Kislyak's connection to Russian intelligence has been debated in the United States. CNN alleged that U.S. intelligence officials have claimed Kislyak is a leading Russian spy and spy recruiter, which Russian officials have denied. According to ABC News, former U.S. ambassadors and analysts contradicted with "strong skepticism" the claim that Kislyak is a spy. According to Newsweek, "People who have worked closely with Kislyak doubt the ambassador was up to anything more than just doing his job" and quoted former U.S. ambassador to Russia Michael McFaul as saying "On political involvement, I personally don't think he crossed any lines". Russian officials "expressed anger" at the allegations against their ambassador, with Russian Foreign Ministry spokeswoman Maria Zakharova calling it "the low professional standards of the American news media."

German-American author and former KGB spy Jack Barsky, however, evaluated Kislyak as a "very experienced operative" and told CNN that when Kislyak was sent to the United States in the early 1980s as a low-level diplomat, it is certain he would have been either a KGB agent or reporting directly to the KGB. James Clapper, former U.S. Director of National Intelligence, stated that Kislyak "oversees a very aggressive intelligence operation in this country ... and so to suggest that he is somehow separate or oblivious to that is a bit much".

According to Bloomberg's Leonid Bershidsky, during former FBI Director James Comey's Congressional testimony on June 8, 2017, Comey "made it clear he didn't consider Russian Ambassador Sergey Kislyak to be an intelligence officer ... Comey said it was not improper for an incoming national security adviser to be in touch with a foreign diplomat. He also said, twice, that a story in a February issue of The New York Times, headlined "Trump Campaign Aides Had Repeated Contacts With Russian Intelligence" and quoting unnamed officials, was gravely flawed. And he stated that closing the investigation into former National Security Adviser Michael Flynn's contacts with Kislyak wouldn't be likely to impede the overall investigation into Russian interference; the two investigations, he added, were "touching but separate".

== Political career ==
On 21 August 2017, the same day Kislyak's term as Russian ambassador to the United States ended, he announced his plans to enter politics as a candidate for the Federation Council of Russia representing the Republic of Mordovia, one of Russia's federal subjects. He visited Mordovia and met with Vladimir Volkov, the interim Head of the Republic of Mordovia, and toured venues under construction for the 2018 FIFA World Cup. The election was scheduled for 10 September. The two other candidates were Mikhail Sezganov, chief federal inspector for Mordovia, and Pyotr Tultayev, mayor of Saransk, the republic's capital.

After winning the election, Vladimir Volkov officially announced that he would appoint Sergey Kislyak, the new Senator from Mordovia.

=== Sanctions ===
He was sanctioned by the UK government in 2022 in relation to the Russo-Ukrainian War.

== See also ==
- Mueller Report
- Foreign electoral intervention
- Russia–United States relations
- Timeline of Russian interference in the 2016 United States elections
- Timeline of Russian interference in the 2016 United States elections (July 2016 – election day)
- Timeline of post-election transition following Russian interference in the 2016 United States elections
- Timeline of investigations into Trump and Russia (January–June 2017)
- Timeline of investigations into Trump and Russia (July–December 2017)
- Timeline of investigations into Trump and Russia (January–June 2018)
- Timeline of investigations into Trump and Russia (July–December 2018)
- Timeline of investigations into Trump and Russia (2019–2020)

Diplomatic posts
Preceded by Yuri Ushakov	Russian Ambassador to the United States; 26 July 2008 – 21 August 2017	Succeeded by Anatoly Antonov
