= List of ambassadors of Russia to Belgium =

Ambassador of the Russian Federation to the Kingdom of Belgium
- Emblem of the Russian Foreign Ministry
- Incumbent; Denis Gonchar since 29 July 2025
- Ministry of Foreign Affairs; Embassy of Russia in Brussels
- Style: His Excellency; The Honourable
- Reports to: Minister of Foreign Affairs
- Seat: Brussels
- Appointer: President of Russia
- Term length: At the pleasure of the president
- Formation: 1853
- First holder: Mikhail Khreptovich
- Website: Embassy of Russia in Belgium

The ambassador extraordinary and plenipotentiary of the Russian Federation to the Kingdom of Belgium is the official representative of the president and the government of the Russian Federation to the king and the government of Belgium.

The ambassador and his staff work at large in the Embassy of Russia in Brussels. There is a consulate general in Antwerp. As of September 2025, Denis Gonchar is the Russian ambassador to Belgium. He presented his credentials to King Philippe on 17 September 2025.

== History of diplomatic relations ==
Diplomatic relations between the Russian Empire and Belgium were first established in 1853, with the first envoy to Belgium, Mikhail Khreptovich, appointed on 11 April 1853. The last imperial envoy, Dmitry Nelidov, continued to represent Russia as an agent of the Russian Provisional Government after the February Revolution in 1917, but ceased to be recognised by the new Soviet government after the October Revolution later that year. Diplomatic relations were established between the Soviet Union and Belgium in 1935, and a new representative, Yevgeny Rubinin was appointed on 2 November that year. His tenure came to an end with the German invasion and subsequent occupation of Belgium in 1940. Relations were restored once more in 1941 after the Soviet Union entered the war on the side of the allies, with Aleksandr Bogomolov appointed envoy to the Belgian government in exile in London. By early 1943 the mission had been upgraded to an embassy. Relations continued after the war, and with the dissolution of the Soviet Union in 1991, the incumbent Soviet ambassador, Nikolai Afanasevsky, continued as the representative of the Russian Federation until 1994.

== List of representatives (1853–present) ==
=== Russian Empire to Belgium (1853–1917) ===
Name	Title	Appointment	Termination	Notes
Mikhail Khreptovich	Envoy	11 April 1853	17 July 1856	
Aleksandr Rikhter	Envoy	17 July 1856	16 April 1859	
Nikolay Orlov	Envoy	3 July 1859	13 December 1869	
Andrey Bludov	Envoy	13 December 1869	30 March 1886	
Lev Urusov	Envoy	3 June 1886	19 November 1897	
Nikolai Girs	Envoy	4 December 1897	20 September 1910	
Ivan Kudashev	Envoy	20 September 1910	17 February 1916	
Dmitry Nelidov	Envoy	10 March 1916	3 March 1917	

=== Russian Provisional Government to Belgium (1917) ===
Name	Title	Appointment	Termination	Notes
Dmitry Nelidov	Envoy	3 March 1917	26 November 1917	

=== Soviet Union to Belgium (1935–1991) ===
Name	Title	Appointment	Termination	Notes
Yevgeny Rubinin	Envoy	2 November 1935	15 July 1940	
Aleksandr Bogomolov	Envoy	18 October 1942	30 November 1943	Envoy to the Belgian government in exile in London; Ambassador in 1943
Viktor Lebedev	Ambassador	30 November 1943	6 January 1945	
Mikhail Sergeyev	Ambassador	20 March 1945	12 July 1946	
Aleksei Pavlov	Ambassador	18 August 1946	25 April 1950	
Viktor Avilov	Ambassador	24 January 1953	9 October 1958	
Sergey Afanasyev	Ambassador	9 October 1958	31 August 1962	
Pavel Gerasimov	Ambassador	29 September 1962	25 March 1967	
Vasily Grubyakov	Ambassador	31 March 1967	28 January 1969	
Fyodor Molochkov	Ambassador	28 June 1969	8 July 1971	
Vladimir Sobolev	Ambassador	8 July 1971	30 April 1975	
Sergey Romanovsky	Ambassador	30 April 1975	30 October 1984	
Sergey Nikitin	Ambassador	30 November 1984	25 May 1987	
Feliks Bogdanov	Ambassador	25 May 1987	8 June 1990	
Nikolay Afanasevsky	Ambassador	24 June 1990	25 December 1991	

=== Russian Federation to Belgium (1991–present) ===
Name	Title	Appointment	Termination	Notes
Nikolay Afanasevsky	Ambassador	25 December 1991	3 October 1994	
Vitaly Churkin	Ambassador	3 October 1994	25 February 1998	
Sergey Kislyak	Ambassador	25 February 1998	28 May 2003	
Vadim Lukov	Ambassador	30 September 2004	27 October 2009	
Aleksandr Romanov	Ambassador	18 December 2009	16 June 2016	
Aleksandr Tokovinin	Ambassador	16 June 2016	29 July 2025	
Denis Gonchar	Ambassador	29 July 2025		
