= Ivan Kropotov =

Russian diplomat (1724–1769)

Ivan Ivanovich Kropotov (Russian: Ива́н Ива́нович Кропотов) (1724–1769) was a Russian diplomat, translator and courtier. He was the head of diplomatic missions of Russian Empire to Qing Dynasty China in the 1760s. He was widely recognized by his contemporaries for his translations of Molière into Russian, and acted in several plays staged at the Russian Imperial Court.

== Biography ==
Born to the family of hereditary military officers, he enlisted in the Leib Guard in 1740. In 1757, he fought and was injured in the Battle of Gross-Jägersdorf. He was discharged in 1758 as Captain-Poruchik, an VIII-grade officer. At this time, he had already been recognized for his translations of theatrical plays from the French.

From 1762 to 1764, he was the Head of Russian forces on the Chinese border. At this time, there were no direct diplomatic connections between Russia and China, and the necessary issues were resolved via Ivan Kropotov. On his return, Kropotov became an Ordonnanz to Empress Catherine the Great who favored his involvement with theatre. In 1767, he was sent to China to sign a commercial treaty, and he died on his way back in 1769.

== Translations ==
He was known to the wider public of his time for his translations of plays by Molière (namely The Miser, The School for Husbands, The School for Wives published under one cover in St Petersburg in 1757 and 1788, and Tartuffe issued in 1757 and 1758) and by Ludvig Holberg.

== Family ==
He married Natalia Gagarina, daughter of Prince Peter Ivanovich Gagarin.

== Sources ==
- Кропотов И. И. в справочном издании: Дипломатический словарь, т. 2. М., 1971. (Kropotov I. I., an entry in the Diplomatic Dictionary, vol. 2, Moscow 1971, in Russian).
