= Jakob Suritz =

Soviet ambassador

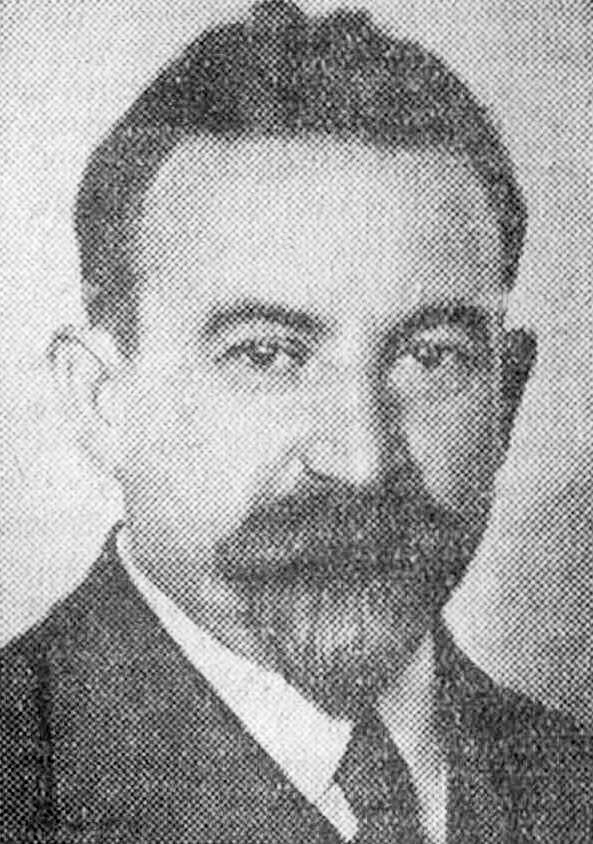
- Jakob Suritz in 1937

Plenipotentiary Representative of the USSR in the German Reich
- In office 1934–1937
- Premier: Vyacheslav Molotov
- Preceded by: Lev Khinchuk
- Succeeded by: Konstantin Yurenev

Plenipotentiary Representative of the USSR in the French Republic
- In office 1937–1940
- Premier: Vyacheslav Molotov
- Preceded by: Vladimir Potemkin
- Succeeded by: Aleksandr Bogomolov

Personal details
- Born: 11 December 1882 Dvinsk, Russian Empire
- Died: 2 January 1952 (aged 69) Moscow, Soviet Union
- Party: Communist Party of the Soviet Union (1917–1952)
- Spouse: Elizaveta Nikolaevna Karpova
- Children: Elizaveta Surits; Hedda Suritz
- Profession: Revolutionary, diplomat

Jakob Suritz (11 December 1882 – 2 January 1952), also known by the Russian version of his name, Yakov Zakharovich Surits (Яков Захарович Суриц), was a Soviet diplomat best known for serving as the Soviet ambassador to France during the Danzig crisis.

== Revolutionary Diplomat ==
Suritz was born in Dvinsk in the Russian empire (modern Daugavpils, Latvia) into a middle class Jewish family. His father, Zakhary Suritz owned a jewelry store, and his mother, Reizi Suritz was a house wife. He was at first active in the main Jewish socialist group in the Russian empire, the General Jewish Labour Bund, which he joined in 1902. In 1903, he joined the Menshevik faction of the Russian Social Democratic Party. In 1905, he took part in the Revolution of 1905. In 1907, he was arrested for his revolutionary activities and exiled to the Tobolsk Governorate in Siberia. In 1908, he married Elizaveta Nikolaevna Karpova, by whom he had two daughters. In 1910, he was released from internal exile and went to Germany to study philosophy at the University of Heidelberg. After the February Revolution of 1917, he returned to Russia.

After the October Revolution of 1917, Suritz defected and joined the Bolsheviks along with his friends Ivan Maisky and Alexander Troyanovsky, both of whom also served as ambassadors for the Soviet Union. In 1917, the new Bolshevik Foreign Commissar Leon Trotsky disbanded the Ministry of Foreign Affairs and created the Narkomindel (Narodnyi Komissariat Inostrannykh Del-People's Commissariat for Foreign Affairs) in its place. Trotsky demanded that all Russian diplomats abroad swear loyalty to the new regime or be fired; the vast majority chose the latter option. Suffering from a serious shortage of experienced diplomats, Trotsky was forced to recruit former Mensheviks such as Suritz into the Narkomindel to serve as diplomats. Suritz had no experience as a diplomat and was only recruited because he was fluent in German and French (the latter being the language of diplomacy at the time).

Suritz initially served as the Soviet minister to Denmark. Subsequently, Suritz was sent to Kabul to serve as the first Soviet minister to Afghanistan. Suritz was described having "arrived like a hurricane" in Kabul in December 1919 as he sent out to convince the Emir Amanullah Khan that he should align Afghanistan with Soviet Russia against the British empire. The fact that the Emir Amanullah had just been defeated in the Third Anglo-Afghan War of 1919 greatly aided Suritz's efforts. From 1920 to 1922, Suritz was also a member of the Turkestan Commission of the All-Russian Central Executive Committee. From 29 May 1922 to 27 April 1923, Suritz served as the Soviet minister in Oslo.

== Ambassador in Ankara ==
From 14 June 1923 to 19 June 1934, Suritz served as the Soviet ambassador to Turkey. Rudolf Nadolny, the German ambassador in Ankara reported: "My Russian colleague Jakob Suritz was a very nice man...I immediately became friends with him and we later made a gentleman's pact that he would only pursue political interests in Turkey, supporting me in my economic endeavors, and I in turn would back him in politics. We both remain faithful to this agreement, which borne rich fruits" .

In April 1926, Suritz formally opened the new Soviet embassy, which was the first embassy in Ankara. Mustafa Kemal Atatürk had moved the Turkish capital to Ankara, but for some times afterwards the embassies remained in Istanbul as other governments believed that Ankara was only a temporary capital. The decision to move the Soviet embassy in Turkey from Istanbul to Ankara was a gesture of friendship towards the new Turkish republic as a sign that the Soviet Union supported Kemal's claim that Ankara was the new capital of Turkey. The new Soviet embassy was built in a style that gave it an "ultra-modern appearance" with "soaring porches" that resembled the "wings of an airplane". The modernist style of the Soviet embassy that had no links to any of the architectural styles of the Russian past was intended to symbolize that the Soviet Union represented a rupture with the past and was the start of something new. Likewise, the modernism of the Soviet embassy was intended to symbolize the universalism of Communism as the modernist look of the Soviet embassy could just as easily being seen in any other structure built in a modernist style anywhere else in the world. Finally, the new Soviet embassy in Ankara was meant to symbolize the way that a backward nation was modernizing under the new Bolshevik regime with its modernist style serving as a symbol of progress and advancement. At the time, the Soviet embassy was unlike any other building in Ankara and caused a sensation when it was opened.

Suritz was close to President Mustafa Kemal Atatürk and arranged for him along with his premier İsmet İnönü to attend a lavish banquet at the Soviet embassy in 1927 to honor the 10th anniversary of the October revolution. Soviet leaders in the 1920s saw Britain as their principle enemy and Kemal 's Turkish nationalist policies, which often pitted him against Britain, led to an informal Soviet-Turkish alliance. The Soviet Union was committed to the destruction of the established international system, and the Soviets allied themselves to any nation that wished to challenge the international order such as Germany in Europe, Turkey in the Middle East and China in Asia. During the Greek-Turkish war of 1920-1922, Britain supported Greece while the Soviet Union supported Turkey. However, Kemal did not wish for a complete break with Britain not the least because he did not want Turkey to become too dependent upon the Soviet Union and he preferred to rebuild the strained Anglo-Turkish relations after the League of Nations decided the Mosul dispute in favor of Britain in 1926. At one ball at the Çankaya Mansion, Kemal was careful enough to place himself between Suritz seated on his left and the British ambassador, Sir George Clerk, seated on his right to symbolize his desire to be desire to keep Turkey in-between the Soviet Union and Great Britain. Clerk noted that anywhere else in the world such events "would scarcely warrant recording in an official dispatch, but Angora [Ankara] is not other places". In 1929, Suritz negotiated and signed a secret alliance with Turkey.

To celebrate the 10th anniversary of the proclamation of the Turkish Republic in 1923, on 26 October 1933 Suritz hosted an elaborate party in Istanbul where the Soviet Black Sea Fleet sailed down the Bosporus, bringing the Defense Commissar, Marshal Kliment Voroshilov as the guest of honor. Suritz greeted Marshal Voroshilov as he landed in Istanbul while a 25-gun salute was fired in his honor. The reception of the Soviet delegation in Istanbul was described as friendly with large crowds cheering the visitors. Most notably, the wives and daughters of the Politburo members went along on the trip to Turkey "in great exception against Stalin's ban against junketing" as the correspondent of Time put it. Upon landing in Istanbul, the wives and daughters were taken away by "the svelte Mrs. Suritz" who had them all redressed in the latest styles of Paris as she felt that the Moscow fashions would make a terrible impression in Turkey. Afterwards, the Soviet party travelled on to Ankara where at a ball at the Soviet embassy hosted by Suritz and his wife with the guest of honor being President Kemal, the wives and daughters of the Soviet delegation were described being "having shone like Soviet Cinderellas".

== Ambassador in Berlin ==
In 1934, he was appointed as the Soviet ambassador to Germany. On 26 October 1934, Suritz arrived at the Reich Chancellery to present his credentials as the ambassador of the Union of Soviet Socialist Republics to Adolf Hitler. Suritz had a difficult time in Berlin as a Jew and a Communist, and frequently had to invoke diplomatic immunity in his disputes with the German authorities. However, within the diplomatic community in Berlin, Suritz was well regarded as an intellectual who had a passion for collecting French Impressionist paintings. Suritz had a very close friendship with the American ambassador in Berlin, William E. Dodd, who like him was an intellectual turned diplomat. In his diary, Dodd wrote that Suritz was the "brightest of local diplomats" and "an impeccable gentleman in all respects". As Suritz spoke no English while Dodd spoke no Yiddish or Russian, the two talked in German, their common language. Dodd was a deeply unhappy man as he came to detest Nazi Germany, which ultimately led to his recall to the United States in 1937. Dodd came to lean on Suritz as one of the few fellow ambassadors whom he shared his feelings about his posting. Unknown to ambassador Dodd, his daughter Martha Dodd who had come with him to Berlin was recruited to work as a spy for the Soviet Union during her time in Berlin by one of her lovers, the Soviet diplomat Boris Vinogradov who served as the First Secretary at the Soviet embassy.

On 14 January 1935, Suritz wrote to the Soviet Foreign Commissar Maxim Litvinov that: "As you know, your German friend has told us that there has been powerful pressure from influential Reichswehr circles and those close to Schacht insisting on reconciliation and agreement with us. According to him, the biggest impression has been our preparedness to develop economic relations." Suritz did not name the "German friend" he was referring to. On 29 May 1935, Suritz reported to Litvinov that he had met the Reichsbank president Dr. Hjalmar Schacht, whom he described as being "very friendly and spoke about the necessity of an improvement in mutual relations".

On 28 November 1935, Suritz reported that he met a number of German officials, whom he listed as the Foreign Minister, Baron Konstantin von Neurath; the Luftwaffe commander, Hermann Göring; the War Minister, Field Marshal Werner von Blomberg; and the Propaganda Minister Dr. Josef Goebbels. Suritz stated: "All my contacts with the Germans have only strengthened my earlier conviction that the course against us, which Hitler has embarked, will remain unchanged, and we cannot expect any serious alternations in the immediate future. All my interlocutors were unanimous in this respect. For an example, I was told that Hitler has three obsessions: hostility towards the Soviet Union (towards Communism), the Jewish Question and the Anschluss; hostility towards the Soviet Union flows not only from his ideological attitude towards Communism, but also constitutes the basis of his tactical line in foreign policy...I repeat that it's more obvious to me now than at any other time before that Hitler and his entourage will not voluntarily change their course as far as relations with us are concerned...There is nothing we can do but patiently and continue to strengthen and develop our economic ties. Strengthening of economic ties on the basis of Schacht's latest proposals suits both sides (this and only this explains the blessing given to Schacht by Hitler). Implementation of the new agreements will set interested commercial circles in motion and bring them closer to us. It will doubles strengthen our "base" in Germany and will make a turn in the political course easier when the present German leadership is forced to by subsequent events".

Suritz reported to Litvinov that David Kandelaki, the Soviet trade attaché in Berlin, was in contact with Dr. Schacht. Soviet officials from Stalin down onwards understood Nazi Germany in Marxist terms, seeing National Socialism as something conjured into existence by the forces of "finance capital" and tended to overrate the influence of Dr. Schacht, whom it was assumed to be the leader of the "finance capital" interests that controlled the Third Reich. Through Hitler's anti-Soviet feelings were taken for granted, it was assumed to be possible to by-pass him and reach an understanding with the leaders of German "finance capital" such as Dr. Schacht. Suritz stated that Dr. Schacht was interested in having the Soviet Union export raw materials to Germany that the Reich lacked such as oil, copper, manganese, and high-grade iron to assist with rearmament, which offered a potential way to affect a change in German foreign policy. On 4 December 1935, Litvinov wrote to Suritz: "The conclusions you draw on the basis of intensified contacts with the Germans don't surprise me at all...I never had any illusions in this respect". Litvinov defined to Suritz that his duties in Berlin were: "There is no point in strengthening present day Germany too much. It is enough in my view, to maintain economic relations with Germany only at a level necessary to avoid a complete split between the two countries". On 10 December 1935, Suritz told the German diplomat Fritz von Twardowski that he "had strict instructions to do everything within my power to bring about, at least outwardly, an improvement in mutual relations". Suritz told Twardowkski he was interested in an economic agreement that might improve relations in the long-term.

On 13 December 1935, Suritz wrote in a report to Litvinov that there were two factions within the German state, one associated with the Nazi party and another that consisted of the military, the industrialists and the Reichsbank who wanted better German-Soviet relations for the purposes of trade. On 17 December 1935, Suritz wrote to the deputy foreign commissar Nikolay Krestinsky that there was "in Reichswehr and industrial circles a growing belief in the unproductiveness and erroneousness of National Socialism's anti-Soviet course". On 19 December 1935, Litvinov wrote back to say he was "skeptical" of what he called the "alleged" split in the German leadership. On 11 January 1936, Krestinsky wrote to Suritz "...neither in Berlin nor in Moscow, nor in any other quarter of the globe, are there any indications of any changes in direction". On 19 April 1936, Litvinov told Suritz that the existing state of German-Soviet economic relations was satisfactory and he was opposed to a new Soviet-German credit agreement for an expansion of trade. On 4 August 1936, Krestinsky informed Suritz: "German affairs have not been discussed here for a relatively long time. The prospects of Soviet-German relations are viewed as in the same way earlier...Germany does not conceal its definitely hostile attitude in relation to us". Krestinsky further stated that though the Germany was offering a credit agreement of one billion Reichmarks to improve trade, but that he was opposed because the reason for the offer were not "political", but "exclusively economic". The outbreak of civil war in Spain led to rapid decline in German-Soviet relations as the Soviet Union intervened on the side of the left-wing Frente Popular government while Germany intervened on the side of the Spanish Nationalists.

In September 1936, German-Soviet relations reached a new nadir with the Nuremberg Party Rally where Hitler and the other Nazi leaders made a number of viscerally violent speeches that denounced "Judo-Bolshevism" in the most strongest of terms and spoke about the desirability of colonizing the Soviet Union as Germany's lebensraum ("living space"). Hitler called for an alliance of Western states to be led by the Reich against "Judo-Bolshevism", which he depicted as a demonic ideology that threatened the existence of civilization. In his keynote speech at the Nuremberg Party Rally, Hitler announced the Four Year Plan designed to have the German economy ready for a "total war" by September 1940 and created the Four Year Plan organisation led by Göring to achieve the goals of the Four Year Plan. On 11 September 1936, Suritz wrote in a report to Moscow that the Soviet Union should make a formal note of protest against what had been said at the Nuremberg Party Rally and that the Soviet Union should cease the export of certain raw materials to punish the Reich. Suritz's recommendations were rejected on the grounds that Soviet intervention in the Spanish Civil War had led to tensions with Britain, and the prospect of worsening German-Soviet relations and with it a German-Soviet war would lead to more pressure from Britain to end the intervention in Spain at a time when the Soviet Union was attempting to improve relations with Britain. Of Suritz's recommendations, only one was adopted, namely that Soviet newspapers denounce what had been said at the Nuremberg Party Rally and the Soviet media gave extensive attention to the Nuremberg speeches.

In November 1936, Germany and Japan signed the Anti-Comintern Pact. At a press conference in Berlin, Joachim von Ribbentrop and General Hiroshi Ōshima informed the world of the Anti-Comintern Pact and invited a number of other nations such as China, Britain, Italy and Poland to sign the pact. Though directed only against the Comintern, Suritz noted that the pact was in fact a thinly disguised alliance against the Soviet Union, which presented the scenario of the Soviet Union facing a two-front war against Germany in Europe and Japan in Asia. On 14 December 1936, Suritz was summoned to meet Göring. Göring told Suritz that he wanted to expand and improve German-Soviet trade to help achieve the ambitious goals of the Four Year Plan and suggested that better Soviet-German economic relations would inevitably lead to better political relations. Suritz noted that Göring made no offers to improve political relations other saying repeatedly that more trade would inevitably improve political relations. On 27 January 1937, Suritz reported to Litvinov that he met Dr. Schacht, who was in favor of a new German-Soviet economic treaty to dramatically improve trade.. However, Suritz stated that Dr. Schacht had imposed a number of political preconditions first, namely the end of Soviet intervention in the Spanish Civil War; the end of support for the Front populaire government led by Léon Blum in France; and for the Soviet Union to renounce the alliances it had signed with France and Czechoslovakia. Suritz stated that Schacht's offer was so one-sided that it should rejected immediately. Unknown to the Soviets, Schacht was acting on his own. At the time, Schacht was losing a power struggle over the control of German economic policy to the other Nazi leaders and he was looking for a foreign policy success that might restore his prestige with Hitler. In August 1936, Schacht had started talks with Blum in Paris that continued well into 1937 for a deal under which France would return French Togoland (modern Togo) and French Cameroon (modern Cameroon) to Germany in exchange for the Reich cutting back its level of military expenditure and lowering its extremely high tariffs.

However, Suritz in a letter to Krestinsky stated he was concerned about the prospect of Germany reaching an agreement with "other states" against the Soviet Union that it was worth allowing Kandelaki to negotiate with Dr. Schacht. Litvinov ordered Suritz to attend the Kandelaki-Schacht talks in view of Kandelaki's lack of diplomatic experience. On 4 February 1937, Litvinov reported to Stalin that Kandelaki and Suritz had met Schacht, but he expressed a negative view of the talks, as he argued that Schacht was only seeking improved trade to assist with German rearmament. Suritz was ordered to negotiate, but also to keep the French ambassador André François-Poncet and the Czechoslovak minister Vojtěch Mastný informed as well. The British historian Geoffrey Roberts argued that the talks with Dr. Schacht were only intended to improve relations, and were not the beginning of an effort to seek an alliance with Germany as otherwise Suritz would have been ordered to keep the talks secret from François-Poncet and Mastný. Jealous over the way that Schacht had trespassed into a matter that properly belonged to the Auswärtiges Amt, Neurath informed Hitler that Schacht had been talking with Kandelaki and Suritz as he demanded that Schacht stick to central banking. Hitler immediately vetoed the talks. On 21 March 1937, Schacht told Suritz that there was nothing to discuss. On 7 April 1937, Suritz was assigned as the new Soviet ambassador to France. Kandelaki was recalled to Moscow, where he was executed for treason.

== Ambassador in Paris ==
=== From the Front populaire era to the Tilea affair ===
In 1937, Suritz was reassigned to the Soviet embassy in Paris. A cosmopolitan, sophisticated intellectual fluent in French, Suritz fitted in better in Paris than he ever did in Berlin. Within the Narkomindel, Suritz was considered to be a Litvinovets ("Litvinov man"). Suritz viewed French politics in Marxist terms as he believed that the French haute bourgeoisie, driven by an obsessive fear of a Communist revolution were turning towards fascism, and that the Franco-Soviet alliance was not a real one. Suritz wrote that for the French haute bourgeoisie, class interests trumped national interests and that the French were heading toward a "complete capitulation to Hitler and Mussolini". Despite being a Communist, the French politician whom Suritz was closest to was Georges Mandel, the former right-hand man to Georges Clemenceau. France and the Soviet Union had signed a defensive alliance in 1935, which called for Franco-Soviet staff talks in the event of an attack by Germany. On 12 June 1937, as part of the Yezhovshchina ("Yezhov times"), Marshal Mikhail Tukhachevsky, the commander of the Red Army along with a number of other senior Red Army commanders were shot on charges of treason and espionage for Germany and Japan. Following the executions, Marshal Maurice Gamelin, the commander-in-chief of the French military, suspended until further notice all Franco-Soviet staff talks on the grounds that any information that he had shared with Tukhachevsky must had reached Berlin and Tokyo since the Soviet government was claiming he was a spy for Germany and Japan. Suritz's primary duty in Paris at first was to argue that the staff talks should be resumed as soon as possible as he noted that Joseph Stalin put much emphasis on the staff talks as a sign that the French were serious about the alliance.

Besides for pressuring the staff talks to resume, Suritz was highly critical of the Front populaire government led by the Socialist Premier Léon Blum, especially its policy of non-intervention in the Spanish Civil War. In his reports to Moscow, Suritz abused Blum as an ineffectual leader who was too concerned about maintaining good relations with Great Britain and he charged that Blum was a coward for refusing military aid to the Spanish republic. Suritz very strongly pressed Blum and his foreign minister Yvon Delbos to resume the military aid to the Frente Popular government in Spain which they had ceased in August 1936, and lashed out in anger at their refusal. Despite the Yezhovshchina and being a former Menshevik, Suritz was not recalled to Moscow to be executed as most of the Soviet ambassadors were at the time. The British historian D.C. Watt noted that with Stalin "an exception was always made for Litvinov and the other Menshevik members of the Soviet diplomatic services-Jakob Suritz in Paris, Ivan Maisky in London, Boris Shtein in Rome. They were certainly watched, but where their colleagues disappeared wholesale, they survived".

During the Sudetenland crisis of 1938, Suritz was ordered by Litvinov to tell the French Foreign Minister Georges Bonnet that there was a possibility that Poland might invade Czechoslovakia if Germany did. Litvinov's instructions to Suritz on 7 June 1938 were: "We want to know in advance if France, in the event of our decision to prevent the intervention of Poland, considers itself bound to Poland by the virtue of the Franco-Polish treaty of alliance". On 26 August 1938, Suritz reported to Litvinov that all intelligence indicated that Germany planned to invade Czechoslovakia that September. In September 1938, Suritz reported to Litvinov that he learned "from a very solid source" within the French government that the British government was pressuring France not to resume the Franco-Soviet staff talks. Suritz reported that a group of French cabinet ministers led by Mandel had insisted that France resume the staff talks and that: "I fully acknowledge that having made this démarche under pressure, Bonnet secretly calculated that we would give a negative reply, or any case an answer useful for arming him with reasons against contact". Mandel had planned to resign in protest against French policy against Czechoslovakia, but he told Suritz that he changed his mind in order to remain in the cabinet. Mandel told Suritz that Bonnet was the chief architect of the French "capitulation" and that he "intentionally distorted the position of the USSR, and in particular hidden [Litvinov's] proposal calling for a meeting of general staffs".

On 18 October 1938, Bonnet told Suritz that he still hoped for close Franco-Soviet relations, which Litvinov received with contempt, writing on the margin of Suritz's report: "Bonnet's most recent declaration has as little meaning as the Anglo-French declaration that 'they do not intend to exclude us from the resolution of European questions'". Litvinov told Suritz not to respond to Bonnet's offer and to avoid talking to him as much as possible. In November 1938, Litvinov told Suritz "The international situation is become ever more clear" as he was convinced that Neville Chamberlain was seeking an understanding with Germany at the expense of the Soviet Union and he felt that Édouard Daladier would not oppose British foreign policy too strongly. On 22 November 1938, Bonnet told Suritz that the planned Franco-German Declaration of Friendship would not affect the existing Franco-Soviet alliance. When Suritz asked Bonnet the next day in a telephone call for the full text of the declaration, Bonnet refused, saying it was a private matter between him and the German Foreign Minister Joachim von Ribbentrop. On 26 November, a stormy meeting occurred as Bonnet accused to Suritz's face the Comintern of being behind the recent industrial unrest and wave of strikes in France that followed the end of the 40 hour work week. Bonnet claimed that "the campaign against the government, by newspapers and organisations incontestably supported by Moscow would profoundly alienate French public opinion".

In December 1938, Mandel told Suritz that he learned from that the Deuxième Bureau believed that Hitler's long-range intention was to conquer the Soviet Union, but Poland and/or Romania were the most likely next German targets.. Mandel also told Suritz that Bonnet was planning to renounce the Franco-Polish alliance, a step that Daladier was stoutly opposed to. Mandel concluded that he felt "slightly guilty" about serving as the Colonial Minister in the Daladier government, but he felt could do more for France as a minister than as an opposition politician. Besides for Mandel, Suritz was in contact with Raymond Patenôtre, the minister of national economy, and César Campinchi, the minister of the marine. On 21 December 1938, Patenôtre told Suritz that he was "an advocate of close co-operation with the Soviet Union" and had heard a rumor that the Soviet Union was planning to renounce the Franco-Soviet alliance, which for him "would be nothing short of a catastrophe for France". Suritz denied the rumor. Likewise, Campinchi told Suritz that he wanted to see the Franco-Soviet alliance strengthened.

On 10 February 1939, Suritz reported that talked with the Socialist leader Léon Blum who told him of his belief that Daladier and Bonnet were leading France "to a new Sedan". Surtiz described Blum as passive and depressed as he was convinced that something terrible would soon happen to France, but he seemed unwilling to do anything practical to stop it. Suritz reported with approval that Mandel was "the complete opposite of Blum", whom Suritz disparaged as a well meaning, but weak willed intellectual. Suritz admiringly wrote that Mandel was "absolutely devoid of any sentimentality. This is in the purest sense a rationalist with a proclivity to cynicism and a strong inclination to conspiracy and intrigue". Suritz wrote that Mandel was trying very hard to have Bonnet sacked as foreign minister as he wrote: "He [Mandel] picks up facts, rumors, materials and bides his times. During the September days [of 1938], when he foresaw impending war and played for the first time the role of a second Clemenceau, he had already soaped the hangman's rope for Bonnet. He is keeping quiet now, but his hatred of Bonnet has not weakened. If you want to know anything about Bonnet, you have to go to Mandel".

On 15 March 1939, Germany violated the Munich Agreement by occupying the Czech half of Czecho-Slovakia. Like Maisky in London, Suritz in his reports to Moscow stressed that there was much anger in both Britain and France over the way that Munich Agreement had been violated. However, Litvinov in response treated both the reports of Maisky and Suritz as referring to something ephemeral as he insisted that the policy of both London and Paris was to encourage Germany to move east. During the Tilea Affair when France's ally Romania appeared to be on the brink of a German invasion, Bonnet asked Suritz if the Soviet Union would be willing to assist Romania. Suritz told Bonnet that Romania was an ally of France, not the Soviet Union, and he expected France to take the lead if Germany should invade Romania. On 4 April 1939, Litvinov in a message to Suritz told him "we do not need advice as how to protect our own interests". On 14 April 1939, Suritz told Bonnet that the Soviet Union would be willing to defend Romania in the event of German aggression and was willing to join an alliance with France and Britain to keep Germany out of Eastern Europe. On 13 April 1939, Britain gave a "guarantee" of Romania and Greece. On 14 April 1939, Bonnet told Suritz that he was willing to add an annexe to the Franco-Soviet alliance of 1935 committing the Soviet Union to declare war on Germany if the Reich should invade Poland and/or Romania.

=== The Danzig crisis ===
In response to the Danzig crisis, the Permanent Committee of National Defense chaired by Daladier decided to reopen the Franco-Soviet staff talks that had been suspended in 1937. Suritz reported to Moscow: "The military, whom one did not see before, new seek my acquaintance. The other day the military governor of Paris gave me breakfast. Many of the military were present. Yesterday I received an invitation from the commander of the fleet". On 14 April 1939, Bonnet met with Suritz to suggest to him a Franco-Soviet mutual assistance pact to protect Poland and Romania. On the same day, the British Foreign Secretary Lord Halifax told the Soviet ambassador in London, Ivan Maisky, that he wanted the Soviet Union to make a unilateral declaration of assistance to Poland and Romania. After hearing of Lord Halifax's offer, Bonnet changed course and declared his support for the British proposal. On 16 April 1939, Bonnet told Suritz "we will not withdraw our proposition, in which we could continue to see every advantage", which led to much ill-will when Suritz learned that Bonnet had in fact withdrawn his support.

On 17 April 1939 Litvinov called a "peace front" of Britain, France and the Soviet Union to protect the peace. On 18 April 1939, Suritz reported to Litvinov after meeting Bonnet "that his first impression is very favorable". On 20 April 1939, Lord Halifax obtained a promise from Alexis St. Léger, the secretary-general of the Quai d'Orsay, that the French would not reply to Litvinov's offer without consulting with the Foreign Office first. On 22 April 1939, Bonnet told Suritz that he had objections to Litvinov's plan, namely that Estonia, Latvia and Lithuania were to be protected by the proposed "peace front", but not the Netherlands, Belgium and Switzerland. On 28 April, Bonnet told Suritz that his initial approval was only "semi-official" and his own "personal suggestion" that should be not considered binding on France. The next day, Bonnet met with Suritz to say that British had not entirely agreed with his plans. Bonnet told Suritz that he had been "engaged constantly in negotiations with the English but until now he still had not obtained an agreement". Despite the promise to Lord Halifax, Bonnet gave Suritz an amended mutual assistance pact. Having given the impression that he was in favor of Litvinov's plan, Bonnet then sought to probe Suritz about his views on Bonnet's version of the "peace front". When Suritz complained about the "absence of reciprocity in obligations" as he charged that under Bonnet's draft, the Soviet Union would have to declare war on Germany in event of aggression against France, but not vice versa, Bonnet professed ignorance and blamed St. Léger. Bonnet told Suritz that St. Léger was incompetent and usually phrased documents very poorly. Bonnet claimed that he was not trying to deceive Suritz, and that the oversight in the draft treaty that omitted any obligation on the part of France to declare war in the event of German aggression against the Soviet Union was another example of St. Léger's typical "incompetence".

Litvinov wrote to Litvinov that he saw merit in Bonnet's plan which covered all of Eastern Europe, only for Bonnet to tell Suritz on 30 April that the only states he envisioned being protected by the "peace front" were Poland, Romania and Turkey. However, Bonnet still insisted to Suritz that he did not share the British view of a very limited role for the projected "peace front" and wanted something more closer to the Soviet version. Suritz described Bonnet as very devious and cunning, and reported to Moscow he was playing his own game. Suritz stated that he was not entirely certain just what Bonnet was trying to do, but it appeared that he wanted better Franco-Soviet relations as a bargaining chip to improve relations with Germany, and that ultimately he was willing to recognize Eastern Europe as being in the German sphere of influence. On 2 May 1939, Bonnet expressed to Suritz displeasure with the direction of British foreign policy in Eastern Europe and told him that he preferred a military alliance uniting Britain, France and the Soviet Union. In response to a complaint from Lord Halifax that the French had violated their promise to make an alliance offer to the Soviet Union without consulting the Foreign Office, Jean Charvériat, the political director of the Quai d'Orsay, told the British ambassador Sir Eric Phipps that "in the heat of the conversation and in order to dispel Souritz's [Suritz] suspicions the undertaking to Lord Halifax was broken".

On 3 May 1939, Litvinov was sacked as Foreign Commissar and replaced with Vyacheslav Molotov. Molotov used Bonnet's statement to Suritz to press for an alliance with Britain and France, must to the discomfort of Chamberlain who merely wanted an Anglo-Soviet understanding. Suritz in a telegram to Molotov on 10 May 1939 wrote that under the British offer the Soviet Union would play "the role of a blind companion in a coalition". Suritz told Bonnet and St. Léger that the French alliances and the British "guarantees" of Poland and Romania were insufficient. Suritz warned that it was quite possible that the Iron Guard would assassinate King Carol II of Romania and/or stage a coup d'etat, at which point Romania would follow into the German sphere of influence. Likewise, Suritz stated that the Sanacja military dictatorship in Poland might collapse or ally itself with Germany.. Suritz stated that only a full military alliance with Britain and France would be acceptable to his government and that the Soviet Union did not feel protected by the Anglo-French security commitments to Poland and Romania..

Suritz privately felt that Molotov's negotiating tactics were too heavy-handed as true to his surname (Molotov means hammer in Russian) he proceeded to relentlessly hammer home the message to the French ambassador Émile Naggiar and the British ambassador Sir William Seeds that only an alliance on Soviet terms would be acceptable to him and he had no interest in any compromises. Suritz felt that Litvinov had more "finesse" as a diplomat in contrast to Molotov's stern, uncompromising negotiating tactics, which he knew were making a highly negative impression in Paris. However, Suritz never warned Molotov that his abuse of Naggiar was not helping the "peace front" talks, out of fear of Molotov. On 26 May 1939, Bonnet gave Suritz the full text of the Anglo-French offer of an alliance, which the British historian Anthony Admathwaite wrote was either a "blunder" or "that he was trying to sabotage the whole negotiations". On 27 May 1939, when Seeds along with the French charge d'affairs Jean Payart met with Molotov to present the offer of an alliance, Molotov had already read the full text which Suritz had forwarded to him and was well prepared to offer his objections.

Suritz wrote that British offer of an alliance of sorts would be to accept being a "blind companion" as he charged that under Chamberlain's offer, the Soviet Union would be obligated to declare war on Germany in the event of a German attack on the United Kingdom, but not vice versa. However, Suritz advised against rejecting Chamberlain's offer, which he felt to be playing into the hands of Bonnet and Chamberlain. Instead, he advised accepting Bonnet's offer of 29 April, which he claimed would "be declaring before the entire world our willingness to support our neighbors exposed to attack and we will put an end to all the fables about our double dealing with Germany".. In his reports to Moscow during the Danzig crisis, Suritz expressed much doubt the willingness of the Chamberlain government to go to war against Germany and stated an alliance with Britain to be as firm as possible to tie the British to an anti-German course. Suritz believed it was possible to tie the French to such an alliance, but felt that the British were the weakest link as he believed that Chamberlain was seeking some sort of understanding with Hitler. As part of the campaign for the "peace front", Suritz told French officials that Germany and Japan were moving closer together, and that as such the Soviet Union was engaged in a border war with Japan, he wanted the "peace front" alliance to be as firm as possible to face both Germany and Japan.. During the "peace front" talks, Molotov insisted on signing a military convention first that would lay out the Anglo-French-Soviet operational plans in the event of war and then signing a political alliance. Both Daladier and Bonnet told Suritz that France would never agree to this procedure and wanted an alliance signed first, to be followed by a military convention.

During the Bastille Day parade on 14 July 1939, Daladier spoke to Suritz to ask him "anything new from Moscow?". When Suritz gave him a negative reply, Daladier stated: "We need to conclude quickly, the more so, that now I do not see any serious disagreements". Daladier was being too optimistic as the British still objected to the Soviet definition of "indirect aggression".. In a message to Suritz and Maisky on 17 July 1939, Molotov wrote "our partners are resorting to all kinds of trickery and disgraceful subterfuge", going on to write: "Our crooks and cheats could pretend that our demands for the simultaneous conclusion of a political and military agreement are something new in the negotiations...It is hard to understand just what they expect when they resort to such clumsy tricks...It seems that nothing will come of the endless negotiations. Then they will have no one but themselves to blame". The American historian Gerhard Weinberg described Molotov's telegrams to Maisky and Suritz as the end of Soviet interest in the "peace front" and the turn towards the alternative strategy of seeking an understanding with Germany at the expense of Poland. In response, Suritz wrote back to Molotov that the British and French "do not want a real agreement" as the ambassador claimed that only French public opinion had pressured Daladier and Bonnet to open the talks.

In July 1939, the Chamberlain government decided to end the Tientsin incident by seeking a diplomatic compromise with Japan while at the same time Britain was rocked by the Hudson affair when a junior British cabinet minister Robert Hudson, 1st Viscount Hudson made an unauthorized offer of a loan to Germany in exchange for ending the Danzig crisis. In a cable to Molotov on 25 July 1939, Suritz stated that France might be a worthwhile Soviet ally, but not Britain. Suritz stated that he believed that Hudson was acting for Chamberlain and he accused the Chamberlain government of a "capitulation" to Japan with respect to the Tinstin crisis. Suritz wrote that the Chamberlain government was not to be trusted as he wrote that the British had no willingness to confront the Axis states such as Japan and Germany. On 27 July 1939, it was announced that an Anglo-French military mission under Admiral Reginald Drax and General Joseph Doumenc would go to Moscow to negotiate an alliance as the British and French had finally accepted the Soviet demand for a military convention first to be followed by a political alliance. On 2 August 1939, Mandel told Suritz that: "London and Paris want to avoid a breakdown of the talks, but there is no sign of any desire to achieve a serious agreement that should be put into effect immediately".. Mandel told Suritz that the talks in Moscow were regarded, especially by the British, as a way to improve the bargaining position with Germany in regard to the Danzig crisis instead being the beginning of a permanent alliance to link together the Soviet Union, France and Britain.

After the Molotov–Ribbentrop pact was signed in Moscow on 23 August 1939, Bonnet called in Suritz to his office to complain.. Bonnet stated that the non-aggression pact had led to "a painful impression" in France and that the French cabinet was "stupefied" that Molotov would sign the non-aggression pact while an Anglo-French military mission was in Moscow to negotiate an alliance with the Soviet Union.. Bonnet lied to Surtiz by claiming that the Polish Foreign Minister Colonel Józef Beck had just granted the Red Army transit rights into Poland in the event of a German invasion, which would have settled the main point of contention in the Anglo-French-Soviet talks. Suritz reported to Moscow that Bonnet had an extraordinary capacity for lies as he crossly noted that Colonel Beck had not granted the Red Army transit rights into Poland.

=== The Winter War ===
Suritz also served as the Soviet ambassador to the League of Nations. On 30 November 1939, the Soviet Union invaded Finland, a fellow member of the League. On 11 December 1939, the former Finnish Foreign Minister Rudolf Holsti gave a speech before the League General Assembly that accused the Soviet Union of unprovoked aggression against his nation. Suritz who seemed embarrassed by his country's actions in attacking Finland did not attend Holsti's speech and instead hide himself away in a hotel. Surtiz did not give a rebuttal speech to Holsti's speech that day. Suritz defended his government's actions at the League during the Winter War and was unable to prevent the Soviet Union from being expelled from the League of Nations on 14 December 1939, the first and only nation to be ever be expelled from the League. During the Winter War, French public opinion was strongly pro-Finnish and whenever Suritz left the Soviet embassy, he faced large crowds that shouted "Vive Finlande!"" ("Long Live Finland!").

On 28 March 1940, Suritz was declared persona non grata after he sent an uncoded telegram to Stalin where he praised him for having foiled the "plans of the Anglo-French warmongers" by defeating Finland in the Winter War. In 1940, Time declared: "Since 1919 bulging, bearded Jacob Suritz has been No. 1 Soviet diplomat, with a brilliant record in Afghanistan, Turkey, Germany and League of Nations wrangles".

== Return to Moscow ==
Following his expulsion from France, Suritiz returned to Moscow where he worked as an adviser for the Narkomindel. In 1943, he wrote a memo entitled "The post-war design of Germany from the point of view of our interests".

== Ambassador in Rio de Janeiro ==
In May 1946, Suritz arrived in Rio de Janeiro (at the time the capital of Brazil) as the first ever Soviet ambassador to Brazil. Luís Carlos Prestes, the leader of the Communist Party of Brazil, greeted Suritz as he arrived in Rio. The Brazilian foreign minister, João Neves da Fontoura, recalled: "At the wharf, there was everything: a shouting of vivas, fireworks, sectarian speech-making-things that caused great displeasure in all circles, mainly in military circles".. Suritz was soon involved in polemics with the Brazilian authorities over charges that the Soviet Union was engaged in espionage in Brazil and the refusal of President Eurico Gaspar Dutra to allow him to attend parties at the Catete Palace as other ambassadors did. Suritz did not stay long in Rio as Brazil severed diplomatic relations with the Soviet Union in October 1947.

== Retirement ==
In 1948, Surtiz retired from the Narkomindel. In his last years, he lived in his dacha outside of Moscow and devoted his time to his art collection, which included works by Henri Matisse and Edgar Degas. On 2 January 1952, he died of a heart attack.

== Bibliography ==
- Adamthwaite, Anthony (1977). France and the Coming of the Second World War, 1936-1939. London: Taylor & Francis. ISBN 9781000352788.
- Aspaturian, Vernon (1971). Process and Power in Soviet Foreign Policy. London: Little, Brown.
- Carley, Michael Jabara (1999). 1939: The Alliance That Never Was and the Coming of World War II. Chicago: Ivan R. Dee. ISBN 9781461699385.
- Dodd, William (1941). Ambassador Dodd's Diary, 1933-1938. New York: Harcourt, Brace.
- Hilton, Stanley E (2010). Brazil and the Soviet Challenge, 1917–1947. Austin: University of Texas Press. ISBN 9780292786431.
- Kezer, Zeynep (2015). Building Modern Turkey: State, Space, and Ideology in the Early Republic. Pittsburg: University of Pittsburgh Press. ISBN 978-0822963905.
- Roberts, Geoffrey (August 1994). "A Soviet Bid for Coexistence with Nazi Germany, 1935-1937: The Kandelaki Affair". The International History Review. 16 (3): 466–490. doi:10.1080/07075332.1994.9640684.
- Sander, George (2013). The Hundred Day Winter War Finland's Gallant Stand Against the Soviet Army. Lawrence: University Press of Kansas. ISBN 9780700619108.
- Stewart, Rhea Talley (1973). Fire in Afghanistan, 1914-1929 Faith, Hope, and the British Empire. New York: Doubleday. ISBN 9780385087421.
- Tsygankov, Andrei (2012). Russia and the West from Alexander to Putin. Cambridge: Cambridge University Press. ISBN 9781139537001.
- Watt, Donald Cameron (1989). How war came: the immediate origins of the Second World War, 1938-1939. London: Heinemann. ISBN 0-434-84216-8. OCLC 19269229.
- Weinberg, Gerhard (1980). The Foreign Policy of Hitler's Germany Volume 2 Starting World War Two 1937-1939. Chicago: University of Chicago Press.
- Zapantis, Andrew (1982). Greek-Soviet Relations, 1917-1941. East European Monographs. ISBN 9780880330046.
