= List of ambassadors of Russia to Japan =

Ambassador of the Russian Federation to Japan
- Emblem of the Russian Foreign Ministry

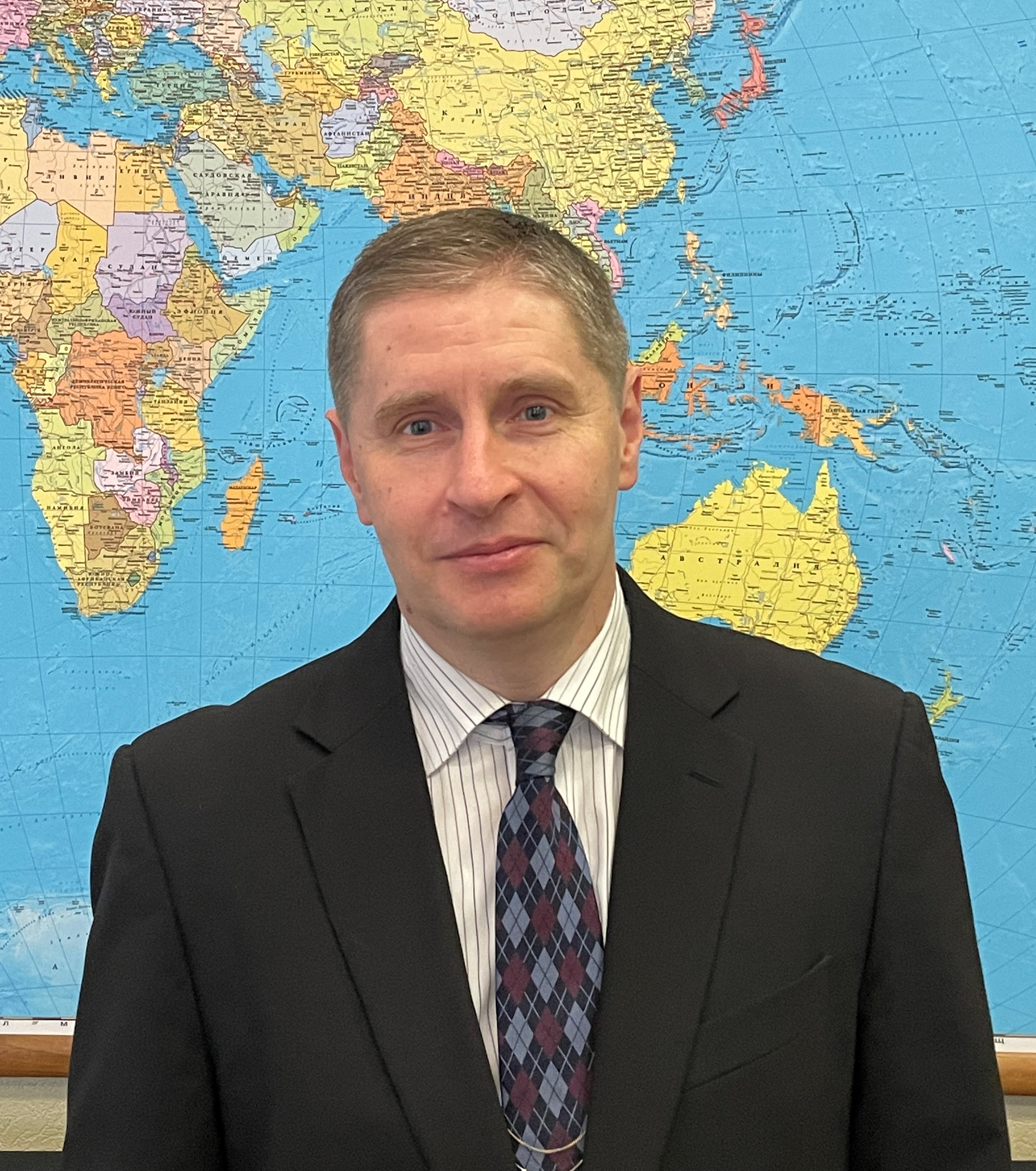
- Incumbent; Nikolai Nozdrev since 19 January 2024
- Ministry of Foreign Affairs; Embassy of Russia in Tokyo
- Style: His Excellency
- Reports to: Minister of Foreign Affairs
- Seat: Tokyo
- Appointer: President of Russia
- Term length: At the pleasure of the president
- Website: Russian Embassy in Japan

The ambassador extraordinary and plenipotentiary of the Russian Federation to Japan is the official representative of the president and the government of the Russian Federation to the prime minister and the government of Japan.

The ambassador and his staff work at large in the Embassy of Russia in Tokyo. There are consulates general in Osaka, Niigata, and Sapporo, and a consulate in Hakodate. The post of Russian ambassador to Japan is currently held by Nikolai Nozdrev, incumbent since 19 January 2024.

== History of diplomatic relations ==
The first official representative of Russia to Japan was Yevfimiy Putyatin in the early 1850s. Putyatin arranged the signing of the Treaty of Shimoda in 1855 which established diplomatic contacts between the two nations, and the Treaty of Tientsin in 1858. Consulates were set up in several Japanese cities, and with the Meiji Restoration in 1868, restrictions on contact with foreign nations were further relaxed. The first consulate was opened in Hakodate in 1858 by Iosif Goshkevich. A consulate in the Imperial capital of Edo, later Tokyo, was first established in 1872 by consul Yevgeny Byutsov, and further developed into the embassy under his successor Karl von Struve. Relations were interrupted with the outbreak of the Russo-Japanese War in 1904, but were re-established after the signing of the Treaty of Portsmouth.

After the February Revolution in 1917, contacts were maintained between Japan and the Russian Provisional Government, and the diplomatic mission continued to function, albeit without accreditation, after the October Revolution later that year. The Japanese government established diplomatic relations with the Soviet Union in 1925. The Soviet Union fought the brief Soviet–Japanese War towards the end of the Second World War, and afterwards refused to sign the Treaty of San Francisco, which normalised relations between Japan and the former allied powers. Full diplomatic relations were not resumed until after the Soviet–Japanese Joint Declaration of 1956. Diplomatic relations continued throughout the twentieth century, and since the dissolution of the Soviet Union in 1991, ambassadors have been exchanged between Japan and the Russian Federation.

== List of representatives (1871–present) ==
=== Russian Empire to Japan (1871–1917) ===
Name	Title	Appointment	Termination	Notes
Yevgeny Byutsov	Chargé d'affaires and Consul General	1 January 1871	15 May 1873	
Karl von Struve	Chargé d'affaires and Consul General (before 3 December 1874); Minister-Resident (3 December 1874 – 1 July 1876); Envoy (from 1 July 1876)	15 May 1873	12 January 1882	
Roman Rosen	Interim Chargé d'affaires	22 November 1877	12 August 1879	
Mikhail Bartolomey	Envoy	12 January 1882	30 November 1882	
Aleksandr Davydov	Envoy	10 April 1883	20 November 1885	
Dmitry Shevich	Envoy	28 January 1886	28 July 1892	
Mikhail Khitrovo	Envoy	28 July 1892	30 June 1896	
Alexey Shpeyer	Interim Chargé d'affaires	25 February 1896	6 November 1897	
Roman Rosen	Envoy	4 February 1897	18 November 1899	
Alexander Izvolsky	Envoy	18 November 1899	24 October 1902	
Roman Rosen	Envoy	1902	28 January 1904	
Russo-Japanese War – Diplomatic relations interrupted (1904–1905)
George Bakhmeteff	Envoy	1906	1908	
Nikolai Malevsky-Malevich	Envoy	1908	1916	
Vasily Krupensky	Envoy	1916	3 March 1917	

=== Russian Provisional Government to Japan (March 1917–unaccredited after October 1917) ===
Name	Title	Appointment	Termination	Notes
Vasily Krupensky	Ambassador	3 March 1917	1921	
Dmitri Abrikosov	Chargé d'affaires	1921	1925	

=== Soviet Union to Japan (1925–1991) ===
Name	Title	Appointment	Termination	Notes
Viktor Kopp	Plenipotentiary Representative	25 February 1925	31 January 1927	
Valerian Dovgalevsky	Plenipotentiary Representative	5 March 1927	21 October 1927	
Alexander Troyanovsky	Plenipotentiary Representative	14 November 1927	24 January 1933	
Konstantin Yurenev	Plenipotentiary Representative	29 January 1933	16 June 1937	
Mikhail Slavutsky	Plenipotentiary Representative	27 July 1937	29 September 1939	
Konstantin Smetanin	Plenipotentiary Representative (until 9 May 1941); Ambassador (after 9 May 1941)	29 September 1939	28 May 1942	
Yakov Malik	Ambassador	28 May 1942	9 August 1945	
Soviet–Japanese War – Diplomatic relations interrupted (1945–1956)
Ivan Tevosian	Ambassador	30 December 1956	30 March 1958	
Nikolai Fedorenko	Ambassador	15 June 1958	16 July 1962	
Vladimir Vinogradov	Ambassador	16 July 1962	3 April 1967	
Oleg Troyanovsky	Ambassador	3 April 1967	17 April 1976	
Dmitry Polyansky	Ambassador	17 April 1976	11 February 1982	
Vladimir Pavlov	Ambassador	11 February 1982	27 February 1985	
Peter Abrassimov	Ambassador	27 February 1985	13 May 1986	
Nikolai Soloviev	Ambassador	13 May 1986	7 August 1990	
Lyudwig Chizhov	Ambassador	7 August 1990	25 December 1991	

=== Russian Federation to Japan (1991–present) ===
Name	Title	Appointment	Termination	Notes
Lyudwig Chizhov	Ambassador	25 December 1991	6 September 1996	
Aleksandr Panov	Ambassador	6 September 1996	25 December 2003	
Alexander Losyukov	Ambassador	2 March 2004	28 December 2006	
Mikhail Bely	Ambassador	28 December 2006	20 February 2012	
Yevgeny Afanasyev	Ambassador	20 February 2012	29 January 2018	
Mikhail Galuzin	Ambassador	29 January 2018	25 November 2022	
Nikolai Nozdrev	Ambassador	19 January 2024		
