= Konstantin Smetanin =

Diplomat of Soviet Union

Plenipotentiary representative of Soviet Union in Japan
- In office 21 September 1939 – 28 May 1942
- Preceded by: Mikhail Slavutsky
- Succeeded by: Yakov Malik

Chargé d'affaires in embassy of the Soviet Union in Japan
- In office 1938–1939

Personal details
- Born: 1898
- Died: 1996 (aged 70 or 71)
- Party: Communist Party of the Soviet Union
- Occupation: Diplomat

Konstantin Aleksandrovich Smetanin (Russian: Константин Александрович Сметанин [kənstɐnʲˈtʲin ɐlʲɪkˈsandrəvʲɪt͡ɕ smʲɪˈtanʲːɪn]; 1898–1969) was a Soviet diplomat.

== Political career ==
Became an advisor to the Soviet embassy in Japan in 1937. He was a member of Communist Party. Until 1937 he was a director of All-Russian Research Institute of Fishery and Oceanography and between 1937 and 1938 he was a counselor of the embassy of Soviet Union in Tokyo, Japan while between 1938 and 1939 he was charge d'affaires in the same embassy. From 21 September 1939 to 28 May 1942 he was a plenipotentiary representative of the Soviet Union in Japan, replacing Mikhail Slavutsky.

In May 1941, he exchanged ratification documents of the Soviet–Japanese Neutrality Pact signed in Moscow the previous month with the Minister for Foreign Affairs of Japan, Yōsuke Matsuoka. When Nazi Germany attacked Soviet Union in June 1941 starting Eastern Front of World War II, Smetanin requested Matsuoka to comply with the Neutrality Pact, however, Japanese side replied that they had favour the Tripartite Pact agreement instead.

In August 1941, Teijirō Toyoda, new minister of foreign affairs of Japan undermined Matsuoka's decision and promised Smetanin that Japan would comply with the treaty. Shortly before the outbreak of the Pacific War between Japan and the United States, Smetanin had held several discussions with the minister of foreign affairs, Shigenori Tōgō, stating that USSR would not violate the Neutrality Pact.

He stopped being an ambassador to Japan on 28 May 1942, with Yakov Malik being appointed as his successor.

== Bibliography ==
- Diplomaticheskiy slovar by Andrei Gromyko, A.G. Kovaleva, P.P. Sevostyanov and S.L. Tikhvinsky, volume 3, Moscow, 1985–1986 page 42
