= Alexander Troyanovsky =

Russian-Soviet revolutionary & diplomat (1882–1955)

- Александр Трояновский
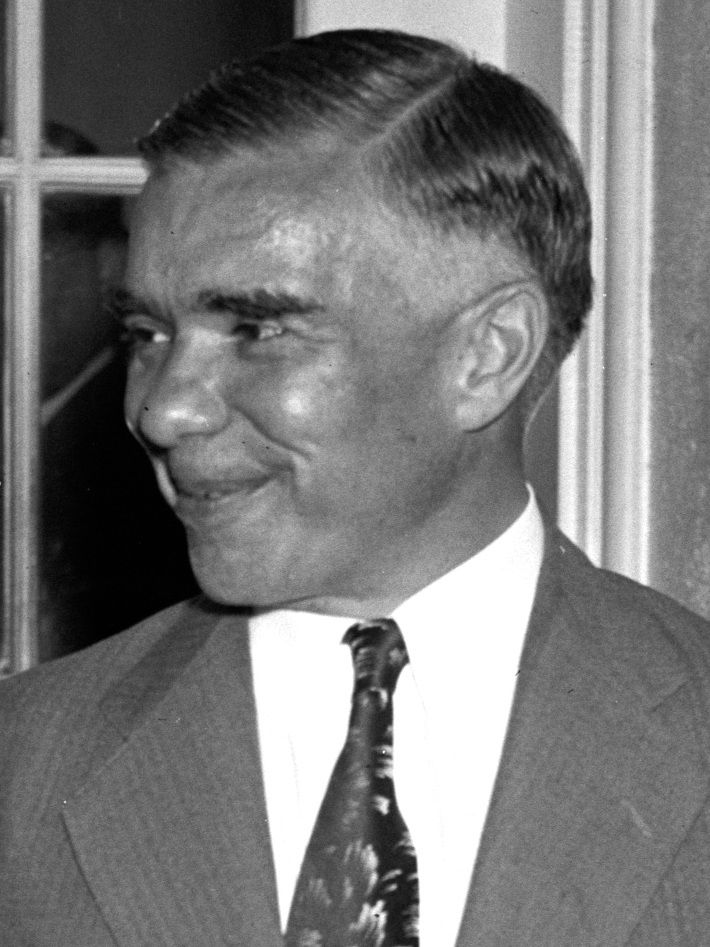
- Troyanovsky in 1937

Soviet Ambassador to the United States
- In office 20 November 1933 – 1 October 1938
- Premier: Vyacheslav Molotov
- Preceded by: Boris Skvirsky (as Charge d'Affaires of the USSR in the USA)
- Succeeded by: Konstantin Umansky

Soviet Ambassador to Japan
- In office 14 November 1927 – 24 January 1933
- Premier: Alexei Rykov; Vyacheslav Molotov
- Preceded by: Valerian Dovgalevsky
- Succeeded by: Konstantin Yurenev

Member of the Russian Constituent Assembly
- In office 25 November 1917 – 20 January 1918 (Note: The Constituent Assembly was declared dissolved by the Bolshevik-Left SR Soviet government, rendering the end the term served.)
- Preceded by: Constituency established
- Succeeded by: Constituency abolished
- Constituency: South-Western Front

Personal details
- Born: 13 January 1882 Tula, Russian Empire
- Died: 23 June 1955 (aged 73) Moscow, Soviet Union
- Resting place: Novodevichy Cemetery
- Party: Communist Party of the Soviet Union (1923–1955)
- Other party: Russian Social Democratic Labour Party (Bolsheviks) (1904–1914); RSDLP (Mensheviks) (1914–1921)
- Spouse(s): Elena Rozmirovich, Nina Nikolayevna Troyanovskaya (nee Pomorskaya)
- Children: daughter Galina, sons Oleg Troyanovsky and Igor Troyanovsky
- Profession: Revolutionary, diplomat

Aleksandr Antonovich Troyanovsky (Russian: Алекса́ндр Анто́нович Трояно́вский; 13 January [O.S. 1 January] 1882 – 23 June 1955) was a Russian revolutionary, military officer and Soviet diplomat who served as the first authorized Soviet Ambassador to the United States.

== Early life and revolutionary career ==
Troyanovsky was born in to the family of a hereditary nobleman and brigadier commander in the Imperial Russian Army. His father died from tuberculosis when he was a child. He and his younger brother joined the military and after graduating from the Mikhailovsky Artillery School he was sent to serve in the 33rd artillery brigade of the Kiev Military District.

From 1904 he was a member of the Russian Social Democratic Labour Party's Bolshevik faction and spread revolutionary and anti war propaganda during the Russo-Japanese War.

In April 1905, he was sent to an artillery unit that took part in battles with Japanese troops in Manchuria. He resigned as a lieutenant in 1906, and in 1907 by the decision of the Kiev military district court he was deprived of all the rights of a retired officer.

In 1908 he was arrested for revolutionary activity, and on 24 February 1909 was sentenced by the Kiev District Court to administrative deportation to the Yenisei province. He served exile in the village of Tikhanovo, Belskaya volost, Yenisei district.

In 1910 he escaped from exile and emigrated abroad with forged documents. He collaborated with the Bolsheviks. A member of the 9th Congress of the Second International in 1911 and the Poroninsky meetings of the Central Committee of the RSDLP with other party cadres. He was a member of the foreign editorial board of the journal "Education". He lived in France and Austria during exile, collaborated with V. I. Lenin and met with Joseph Stalin.

He broke with the Bolsheviks in 1914, became a Menshevik and maintained defencist positions.

In 1917 he returned to Russia, joined the Imperial Army, took part in hostilities on the Southwestern Front.

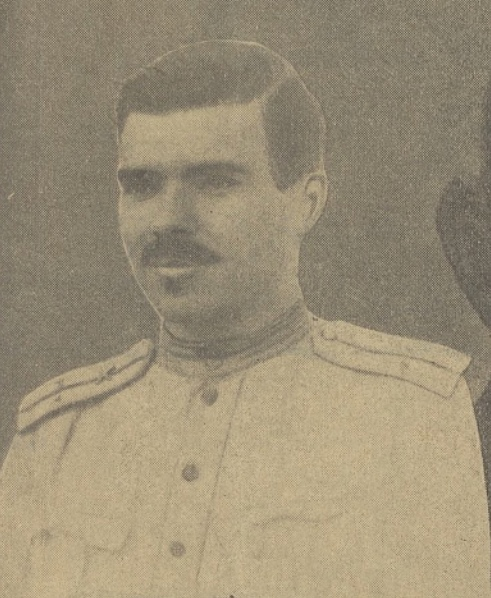
Troyanovsky in uniform c. 1917

He was elected on the Menshevik list as a deputy to the Constituent Assembly, and spoke in support of forming a bloc with the Socialist-Revolutionaries and Bolsheviks in the elections. At the only meeting of the Constituent Assembly on 5 January 1918, he spoke on the issue of concluding peace, while transparently hinting that the Bolsheviks were selling Russian interests in the war for "German gold".

At the Moscow party conference in May 1918, he was elected a member of the Central Committee of the Menshevik Party.

After the outbreak of the Russian Civil War, from 1918 to 1921 he served in the Red Army and was a teacher at the School of Senior Instructors.

In July 1918 he was arrested for anti-Soviet activities and was held in the Butyrka Prison until his release in October. He was arrested for the second time in September 1920, and was held in prison for one month.

In the spring of 1920, when discussing Yuli Martov's report The Dictatorship of the Proletariat and Democracy, Troyanovsky drew attention to "the need for a more detailed answer to the question" and about the relationship between bourgeois democracy and proletarian democracy "there are no grounds for it", and then it should be admitted "that the only correct path to socialism is the path of Lenin."

From 1921 he was in the apparatus of the People's Commissariat of the Workers' and Peasants' Inspection of the RSFSR, and in 1923 he officially joined the Russian Communist Party (b).

From 1924 to 1927 he was chairman of the Board of the Gostorg of the RSFSR and a member of the board of the People's Commissariat of Foreign Trade of the USSR.

== Soviet diplomat ==
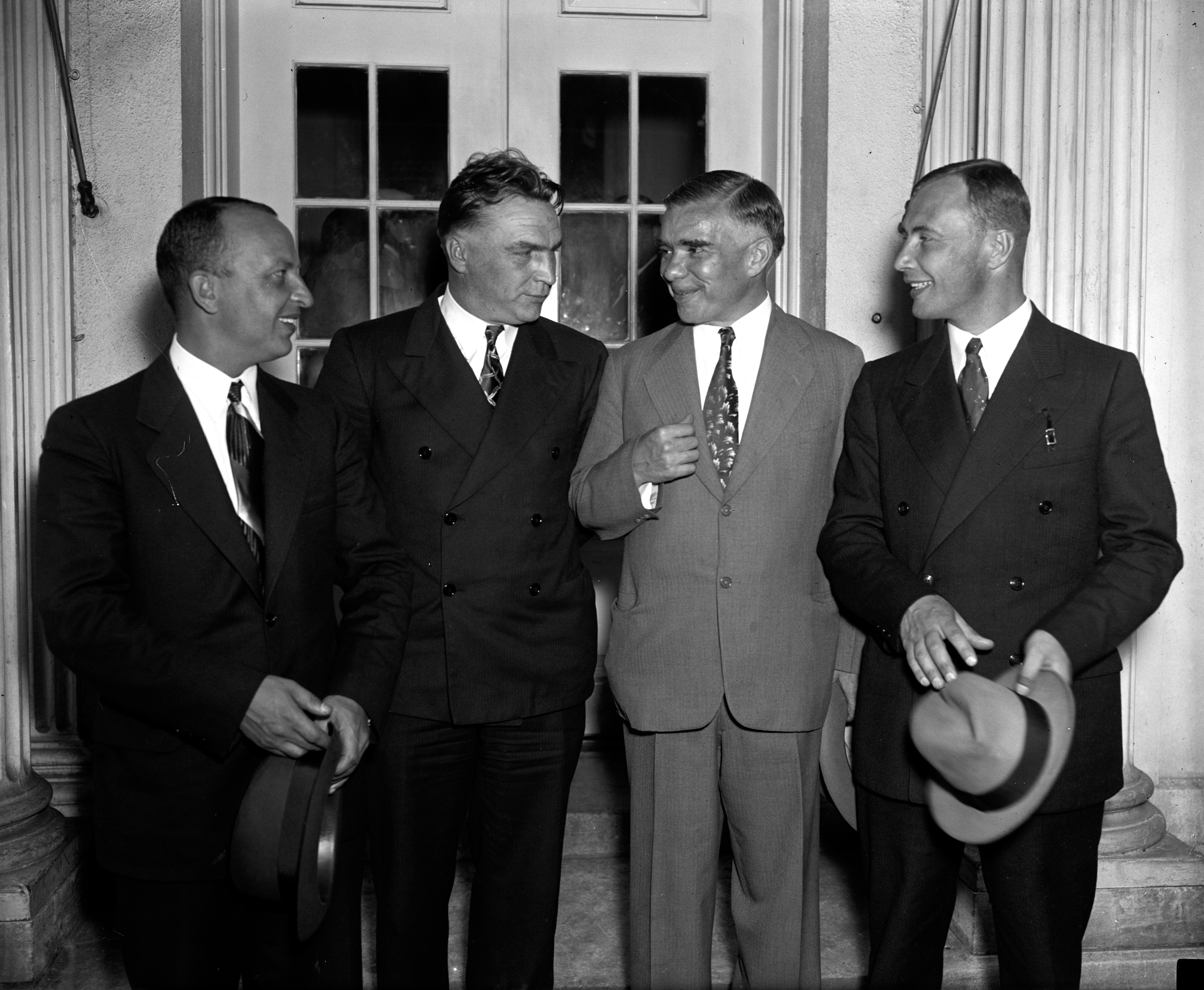
Ambassador Troyanovsky (second from right) leaving the White House with Soviet pilots after visiting president Roosevelt

From 14 November 1927 to 24 January 1933 he was the Plenipotentiary Representative of the USSR in Japan.

In 1933 he was deputy Chairman of the State Planning Committee under the Council of People's Commissars of the USSR.

From 20 November 1933 to 1 October 1938 Troyanovsky served as the Plenipotentiary Representative of the USSR in the United States. The presentation of credentials to U.S. President Franklin D. Roosevelt took place not two weeks later which was the usual procedure, but the day after Troyanovsky's arrival in Washington, which was evidence of the desire of the U.S. president to emphasize special respect and attention to the country. Welcoming Troyanovsky, Roosevelt expressed his satisfaction at the appointment to the post of Soviet ambassador to Washington "a man known for his friendly attitude towards the USA". The years of Troyanovsky's tenure as plenipotentiary representative of the USSR were years of formation of Soviet–American relations and the first steps towards cooperation in the trade, economic, scientific and cultural fields. Troyanovsky played an important role in the conclusion of the 1935 Soviet–American trade agreement, which was renewed annually in subsequent years. Roosevelt once joked at one of the receptions in the White House: "If Mr. Troyanovsky says, looking at the moon, that this is the sun, I personally, gentlemen, will believe him...".

He had direct access to Stalin, to whom he reported on the strengths of American life that were considered to be adopted by the USSR. In his reports from Washington he advocated rapprochement with the United States in the face of the threat of Nazism.

== Later life ==
From 1941 he taught at the Higher Diplomatic School of the People's Commissariat for Foreign Affairs of the Soviet Union. From 1941 worked in the Soviet Information Bureau under the Council of Ministers of the USSR. From 1947 he was a professor at the Higher Diplomatic School.

He was a member of the Central Executive Committee of the Soviet Union.

Troyanovsky died on 23 June 1955, at the age of 73. He was buried at the Novodevichy Cemetery in Moscow. His son Oleg also became a Soviet diplomat and Soviet Union's permanent representative to the United Nations.
