= Aleksandr Panov (diplomat) =

Russian diplomat (born 1944)

- Александр Панов

Rector of Diplomatic Academy of the Ministry of Foreign Affairs of the Russian Federation
- In office 1 Jule 2006 – 1 December 2010
- Preceded by: Yuri Fokyn
- Succeeded by: Evgeny Bazhanov

Ambassador of Russia to Norway
- In office 29 April 2004 – 20 June 2006
- Preceded by: Yuri Kvitsinskiy
- Succeeded by: Sergey Andreyev

Ambassador of Russia to Japan
- In office 6 September 1996 – 25 December 2003
- Preceded by: Ludwig Chizhov
- Succeeded by: Alexander Losyukov

Deputy Minister of Foreign Affairs
- In office 30 December 1993 – 15 October 1996

Ambassador of Russia to South Korea
- In office 6 September 1996 – 25 December 2003
- Preceded by: Oleg Sokolov
- Succeeded by: Georgiy Kunadze

Personal details
- Born: 6 July 1944 (age 82) Moscow, Russian Soviet Federative Socialist Republic, USSR
- Education: Moscow State Institute of International Relations
- Awards: Order of Honour; Medal "For Labour Valour"; Honored Employee of the Diplomatic Service of the Russian Federation

Aleksandr Nikolayevich Panov (born 6 July 1944) is a Russian diplomat.

Born in Moscow, Panov graduated from the Moscow State Institute of International Relations in 1968. He entered the diplomatic service immediately upon graduation.

Panov served in a number of important diplomatic posts for the Soviet Union and continued to serve his country as the Russian Federation. In 1992 he became the Ambassador of the Russian Federation to the Republic of Korea. In 1994 he returned to Russia to become the Deputy Foreign Minister. In 1996 he became the ambassador to Japan and in 2004 the ambassador to Norway.

== Career ==
Has been in the diplomatic service since 1968. Candidate of Historical Science, Doctor of Political Science. Fluent in English and Japanese.

In 1968 served as referent of the Far Eastern Department of the Ministry of Foreign Affairs of the USSR.

In 1968—1971 — attache of the USSR Embassy in Japan.

In 1971—1977 worked as lecturer at MGIMO.

In 1977—1981 became Third Secretary, then Second Secretary of the Permanent Mission of the USSR to the UN in New York (USA).

In 1982—1983 served as First Secretary of the Second Far Eastern Department of the Ministry of Foreign Affairs of the USSR.

In 1983—1988 — Counsellor of the USSR Embassy in Japan.

In 1988—1991 — Head of Department of the Pacific Region and South-East Asia of the Ministry of Foreign Affairs of the USSR.

In 1991—1992 — Director of the Department of the Pacific Region and South-East Asia of the Ministry of Foreign Affairs of the Russian Federation.

From 10 February 1992 to 1 November 1993 — Ambassador Extraordinary and Plenipotentiary of the Russian Federation to the Republic of Korea.

From 30 December 1993 to 15 October 1996 — Deputy Minister of Foreign Affairs of Russia.

From 6 September 1996 to 25 December 2003 — Ambassador Extraordinary and Plenipotentiary of the Russian Federation to Japan.

From 29 April 2004 to 20 June 2006 — Ambassador Extraordinary and Plenipotentiary of the Russian Federation to Norway.

From 1 July 2006 to 1 December 2010 Rector of Diplomatic Academy of the Ministry of Foreign Affairs of the Russian Federation.

Currently works as a chief researcher at the Institute for US and Canadian Studies of the Russian Academy of Sciences and part-time professor at MGIMO.

On March 29, 2022 he was excluded from the Scientific Council of the Russian Security Council after signing the "Joint Statement of the Participants of the Expert Dialogue on Reducing the Risks of Military Confrontation between Russia and NATO in Europe".

== Awards ==
- Medal "For Labour Valour" (1986)
- Order of Honour (1998)
- Honored Worker of the Diplomatic Service of the Russian Federation (2005)
