= Stephen Laird =

Stephen Laird (born Laird Lichtenwalner; August 1, 1915 – February 15, 1990) was an American journalist, working as a Time magazine reporter and CBS correspondent. He was also accused of being a Soviet spy and supposedly becoming a communist in the 1930s and the 1940s and provided information to agents of the Soviet Union.

Laird was allegedly recruited by the Soviets while he was at Swarthmore College in the early 1930s. Laird told the Allentown Morning Call in 1986 that he became close friends with future Soviet ambassador to the United Nations, Oleg Troyanovsky, who was son of Aleksandr A. Troyanovsky, the first Soviet ambassador to the United States from 1934 to 1938, while at Swarthmore. Oleg was a fellow student and member of the football team, of which Laird was assistant coach, and later became a foreign policy assistant and interpreter for Joseph Stalin and adviser to Nikita Khrushchev.

Laird was supposedly considered to be a politically well-developed person by the MGB in 1944 and being used as an agent. In 1949 he was living in Vic Vaud, Switzerland. His case was referred to the CIA in the fall of 1950.

The story of Laird's secret life surfaced for the first time in the Venona files. Laird's reported code name in both Soviet intelligence and the Venona files is "Yun".
