= Valerian Dovgalevsky =

Soviet diplomat

- Валериан Довгалевский
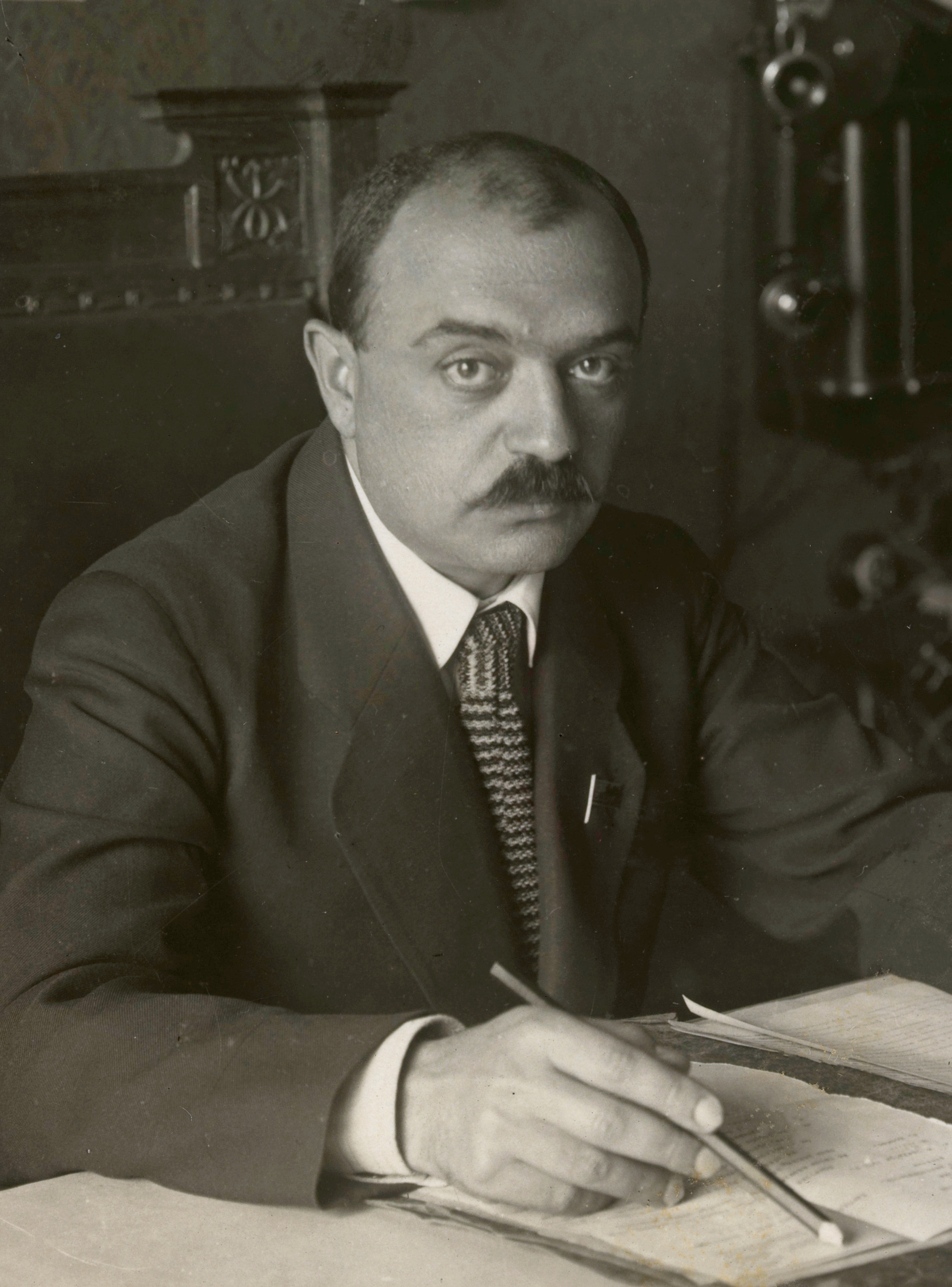
- Dogvalevsky in 1923

5th People's Commissar of Posts and Telegraphs of the Russian Socialist Federative Soviet Republic
- In office 26 May 1921 – 6 July 1923
- Prime Minister: Vladimir Lenin
- Preceded by: Artemy Lyubovich
- Succeeded by: Office abolished

Personal details
- Born: 23 September 1885 Vasilkovsky Uyezd, Kiev Governorate, Russian Empire (present-day Ukraine)
- Died: 14 July 1934 (aged 48) Paris, France
- Resting place: Necropolis at the Kremlin Wall
- Party: Russian Social Democratic Labour Party since 1908, French Socialist Party since 1915

Valerian Savelievich (Saulovich) Dovgalevsky (23 September 1885 – 14 July 1934) was a member of the Bolshevik revolutionary movement, Soviet statesman, diplomat and People's Commissar of Posts and Telegraphs of the Russian Socialist Federative Soviet Republic.

He was a member of the Russian Social Democratic Labour Party from 1908 and the French Socialist Party from 1915.

== Biography ==
He participated in the revolutionary movement since 1904. In 1906, he was arrested and sentenced to an eternal settlement. In the spring of 1908, however, he fled abroad.

- 1908–1910 – Secretary of the Bolshevik group in Liège, Belgium;
- 1911–1914 – Secretary of the Bolshevik group in Toulouse, France;
- 1913 – Graduated from the Electrotechnical Institute in Toulouse.

In July 1917, he returned to Russia and in 1918 joined the Red Army.

- 1919–1920 – People's Commissar of Railways of the Russian Socialist Federative Soviet Republic;
- 1920 – Member of the Commission of the Council of Labor and Defense of the Russian Socialist Federative Soviet Republic for the restoration of roads in Siberia and the Urals;
- 1920 – Communications inspector and commissar of the district engineering department in Kiev;
- 1921–1923 – People's Commissar of Posts and Telegraphs of the Russian Socialist Federative Soviet Republic;
- 1923–1924 – Deputy People's Commissar of Posts and Telegraphs of the Soviet Union;
- 1924–1927 – Plenipotentiary Representative of the Soviet Union in Sweden;
- March – October 1927 – Plenipotentiary Representative of the Soviet Union in Japan;
- 1927–1934 – Plenipotentiary Representative of the Soviet Union in France.

In October 1929, he signed a protocol in London on the restoration of Soviet–British diplomatic relations, which had been severed in May 1927. In November 1932, he signed the Soviet–French Non–Aggression Pact. In 1933, he began to take part in the work of the conference on disarmament in Geneva.

He died on 14 July 1934 in a clinic near Paris from intestinal cancer. Condolences over his death were expressed by President Albert Lebrun and Foreign Minister Louis Barthou. He was cremated at the Père Lachaise crematorium. The urn with his ashes was delivered by plane to Moscow and buried in the Kremlin Wall Necropolis .

Preceded by Artemy Lyubovich	People's Commissar of Posts and Telegraphs of the Russian Socialist Federative Soviet Republic; 1921–1923	Succeeded by Not
Preceded by Valerian Obolensky	Plenipotentiary Representative of the Soviet Union in Sweden; 1924–1927	Succeeded by Victor Kopp
Preceded by Victor Kopp	Plenipotentiary Representative of the Soviet Union in Japan; 1927	Succeeded by Adolf Joffe
Preceded by Christian Rakovsky	Plenipotentiary Representative of the Soviet Union in France; 1927–1934	Succeeded by Chargé d'Affaires; Marcel Rosenberg
