= Soviet–French Non–Aggression Pact =

Non-Aggression Pact between the USSR and the French Republic

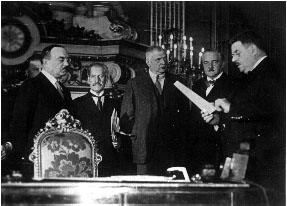
Valerian Dovgalevsky, Plenipotentiary Representative of the Soviet Union in France, reads the text of the pact in the presence of French Prime Minister Édouard Herriot

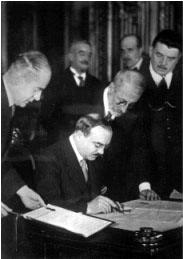
The Plenipotentiary Representative of the Soviet Union in France Valerian Dovgalevsky signs a non–aggression pact

The Soviet–French Non–Aggression Pact was a non-aggression pact concluded on November 29, 1932 between the Soviet Union and France. The agreement was preceded by lengthy negotiations, which began back in 1928.

== Background ==
In the spring of 1931, Franco–Soviet relations, which had been in crisis since the fall of 1930, were revived. On April 20, 1931, the French Ministry of Foreign Affairs proposed to the People's Commissariat of Foreign Affairs to conclude a non–aggression pact and a trade treaty for both countries. Moscow welcomed these proposals and on August 10, 1931, the Soviet Union and France initialed a non–aggression pact. Unexpectedly, in September 1931, the Élysée Palace demanded that the Soviet–French non–aggression pact be accompanied by a non–aggression pact between the Soviet Union and Poland. In January 1932, Paris added that the preliminary signing of a similar agreement between Moscow and Bucharest had become mandatory for the conclusion of a Franco–Soviet non–aggression pact.

The improbability of an imminent signing of a Soviet–French non–aggression pact became apparent in the spring of 1932, when the head of the French government André Tardieu announced the idea of rapprochement between the five Danube countries (Austria, Hungary, Czechoslovakia, Romania and Yugoslavia). The move drew criticism in Moscow. Despite the fact that the Danube project of Tardieu was positioned as an anti–German initiative, Soviet diplomats suspected that the emergence of the Danube federation posed a military threat to the Soviet Union. In May 1932, the Political Bureau of the Central Committee of the All–Union Communist Party (Bolsheviks) instructed the study of the problems of the war of the Central European states against the Soviet Union and the role of France. However, the Tardieu project was not implemented due to the confrontation between Germany and Italy.

With the resignation of Tardieu and the formation of the Édouard Herriot government on June 3, 1932, Soviet–French contacts returned to a dynamic character. This was facilitated by the fact that on July 25, 1932, Moscow signed a non–aggression pact with Warsaw. In August 1932, a major contract was signed for the supply of Soviet oil to France, and Herriot told Dovgalevsky, the Plenipotentiary of the Soviet Union in Paris, that he did not want to subordinate the Soviet–French pact to the Soviet–Romanian one.

== Agreement ==
As a result, the Franco–Soviet non–aggression pact was signed on November 29, 1932.

The first article of the treaty stated that the parties mutually undertake not to resort (separately or jointly with other states) either to war or to attack each other, and also to respect the inviolability of the territory of another party to the treaty.

Article Two contained the obligation of the parties to maintain neutrality and not to provide assistance and support to the aggressor or aggressors if one of the parties is attacked.

In Article Three, each side stated that "it is not bound by any agreement imposing an obligation on it to participate in an attack by a third state".

Under Article Four, the parties pledged "not to participate in any international agreement that would have the practical effect of prohibiting the purchase from the other Party, or the sale of goods to it, or the provision of loans to it, and not to take any measure that would have the effect of excluding the other Party from any participation in its foreign trade".

Article Five contained a mutual obligation of non–interference in each other's internal affairs, in particular of refraining from "any action tending to incite or encourage any agitation, propaganda or attempted intervention" and so on.

Similar agreements in 1932 were concluded by the Soviet Union with Finland, Poland, Latvia and Estonia.

== See also ==
- Franco–Soviet Mutual Assistance Pact
- Soviet–Polish Non-Aggression Pact
- Soviet–Finnish Non-Aggression Pact
- Soviet–Estonian Non-Aggression Pact
- Soviet–Lithuanian Non-Aggression Pact

== Sources ==
- Foreign Policy Documents of the Soviet Union, Volume 14, Pages 392–395
- Foreign Policy Documents of the Soviet Union. Moscow, 1969, Volume 15, Pages 436–439
- Archive of the Foreign Policy of the Soviet Union. Letter From the Deputy People's Commissar for Foreign Affairs of the Soviet Union to the Plenipotentiary Representative of the Soviet Union in France Valerian Dovgalevsky Dated January 2, 1928
- Archive of the Foreign Policy of the Soviet Union. Records of the Conversations Between the Deputy People's Commissar for Foreign Affairs of the Soviet Union and the French Ambassador to the Soviet Union on May 22, 1929 and March 10, 1931
- Archive of the Foreign Policy of the Soviet Union. Report of the Plenipotentiary Representative of the Soviet Union in France to the People's Commissariat of Foreign Affairs Dated September 23, 1931
