= Elena Rozmirovich =

Russian politician (1886–1953)

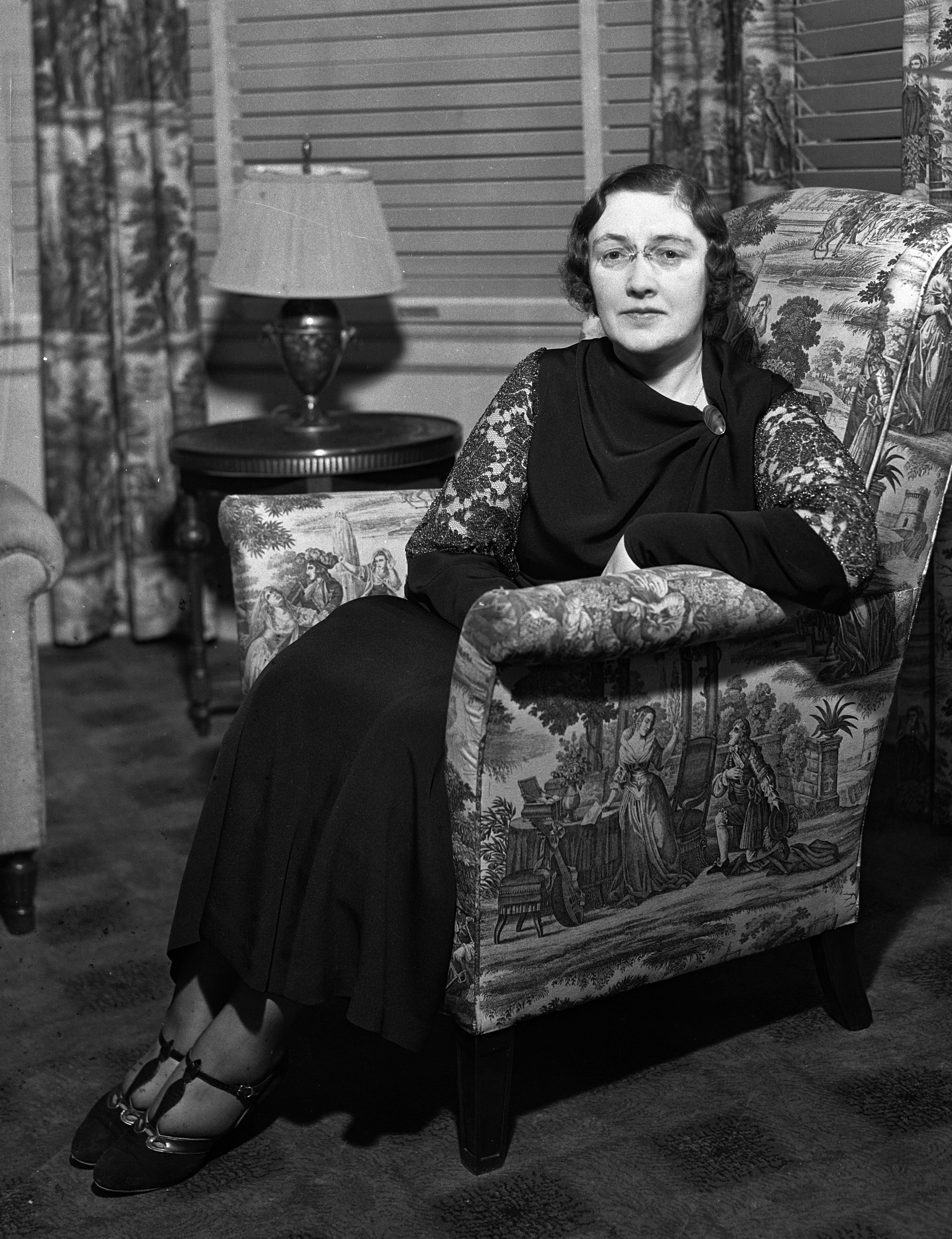
- Rozmirovich in the mid-1930s

Member of the Constituent Assembly
- In office 1918
- Constituency: South-Western Front

Personal details
- Born: 10 March 1886 Petropavlivka, Kherson province, Russian Empire
- Died: 30 August 1953 (aged 67) Moscow, Soviet Union
- Spouse(s): Alexander Troyanovsky; Nikolai Krylenko

Elena Fyodorovna Rozmirovich-Troyanovskaya (Russian: Елена Фёдоровна Розмирович, 10 March 1886 – 30 August 1953) was a Russian revolutionary and politician and later an official in the Soviet Union. In 1917 she was one of the ten women elected to the Constituent Assembly, becoming the country's first female parliamentarians.

== Biography ==
Rozmirovich was born in Petropavlivka, in 1886, the daughter of Theodore Maish, an immigrant from Luxembourg and Mariia Krusser from Moldavia. Mariia had previously been married to Theodore's brother Gottleib, but had married Theodore after Gottleib's death. One of Rozmirovich's half-sisters, Yevgenia, later became a prominent Soviet politician. After graduating from high school, she continued her education abroad, graduating from the law faculty of the University of Paris. Having become involved in social democratic circles while in Paris, she joined the Russian Social Democratic Labour Party in 1904. She moved to Kiev, where she began promoting revolutionary ideas amongst farm and railway workers. She was appointed secretary of the party's southern regional railway office in 1907; she was arrested in the same year, and again in 1909, after which she was sentenced to a year in prison and three years' exile in Narym. However, after serving the year in prison, Rozmirovich was allowed to go into exile abroad rather than being sent to Narym, leaving her daughter with Yevgenia.

She subsequently lived in Paris and Vienna with her husband Alexander Troyanovsky, where she continued party activities and represented it at the International Socialist Congress in Basel. She was also involved in the Bolshevik press, including Pravda and Rabotnitsa. In January 1913 she was arrested during an attempt to deliver a message to Kamo in Tiflis. However, she was released after Troyanovsky sent a letter to her parents threatening to expose the person who caused her arrest as an Okhrana agent; this letter was intercepted by the Okhrana and shown to Roman Malinovsky, a Bolshevik politician and Okhrana agent. Malinovsky persuaded Stepan Petrovich Beletsky to order her release. She left Russia again, participating in a party conference in Bern and attending the International Socialist Women's Conference in the city. She divorced Troyanovsky, and according to Malinovsky, had an affair with him; she later married Nikolai Krylenko. She again returned to Russia for underground activities, but was caught in Moscow and spent six months in Butyrka prison. After leaving prison she was sent to Kharkiv, and then exiled to Irkutsk for five years.

During the February Revolution Rozmirovich was a member of the Irkutsk city committee of the Bolsheviks. In March 1917 she relocated to Petrograd, where she helped organise for the party among military units based in the city and became editor of Soldatskaya Pravda. During the October Revolution she carried out assignments in garrisons and on the fronts. She was a Bolshevik candidate in South-Western Front constituency in the 1917 Constituent Assembly elections, and was one of ten women elected to the legislature alongside Yevgenia.

In January 1918 Rozmirovich became head of the investigative commission of the first Revolutionary Tribunal. In 1919 she was also appointed chair of the political directorate of the People's Commissariat for Railways. In 1922 she was sent to work for the Rabkrin on the direct orders of Vladimir Lenin, initially heading its legal department. Between 1924 and 1930 Rozmirovich served as a member of the Central Control Commission of the Communist Party of the Soviet Union. Her marriage to Krylenko ended during the late 1920s. From 1931 to 1933 she was a member of the board of the People's Commissariat for Communications, and then served as director of the State Library from 1935 to 1939. She died in 1953, and was buried in the Novodevichy Cemetery.
