= List of ambassadors of the Soviet Union to the Bukharan People's Soviet Republic =

This is a list of ambassadors of the Russian Socialist Federative Soviet Republic and Soviet Union to the Bukharan People's Soviet Republic.

== Ambassadors of the RSFSR/Soviet Union to the Bukharan People's Soviet Republic ==
Name	Photo	Title	Date from	Date until
Konstantin Yurenev		Plenipotentiary	16 May 1921	1 February 1922
Andrey Bodrov		Plenipotentiary	-	1 August 1922
Igor Fonshteyn		Plenipotentiary	9 August 1922	21 December 1923
Andrey Znamensky		Plenipotentiary	1923	1 April 1925
Source: Справочник по истории Коммунистической партии и Советского Союза 1898–1991
