= South-Western Front electoral district =

Constituency of the Russian Republic

The South-Western Front electoral district (Russian: избирательный округ Юго-Западного фронта) was a constituency created for the 1917 Russian Constituent Assembly election. The electoral district covered the South-Western Front of the Russian Army.

== Results ==
South-Western Front
Party	Vote	%
List 1 - Socialist-Revolutionaries and Soviet of Peasants Deputies of the South-Western Front	402,930	40.00
List 4 - Bolsheviks	292,626	29.05
List 3 - Ukrainian Socialist-Revolutionaries, Ukrainian Soc.-Dem. Labour Party and Socialist-Cossacks	168,354	16.71
List 2 - Mensheviks	79,630	7.90
List 6 - Socialist Group of Muslim Soldiers of the South-Western Front	32,910	3.27
List 7 - Kadets; List 10 - Kadets and Allies	13,724	1.36
List 9 - Popular Socialists	3,084	0.31
List 5 - Unity and Non-Partisans, United by the Desire to Save the Motherland	?	
List 8 - Congress of the Delegates of Polish Servicemen	?	
Unaccounted	14,165	1.41
Total:	1,007,423	

Deputies Elected
Dansky	SR
Detlaf	SR
Dikansky	SR
Filippovsky	SR
Levenberg	SR
Lishchev	SR
Moiseenko	SR
Nikotin	SR
Sokoloff	SR
Surgutchev	SR
Troyanovsky	Menshevik
Bereznyak	Ukrainian SR
Dolgov	Ukrainian SR
Kutsyak	Ukrainian SR
Chudnovsky	Bolshevik
Kokovikhin	Bolshevik
Lashevich	Bolshevik
Marchenkov	Bolshevik
Pyatakov	Bolshevik
Rozmirovich	Bolshevik
Trubachev	Bolshevik
