= Oleg Troyanovsky =

Soviet diplomat (1919–2003)

- Олег Трояновский
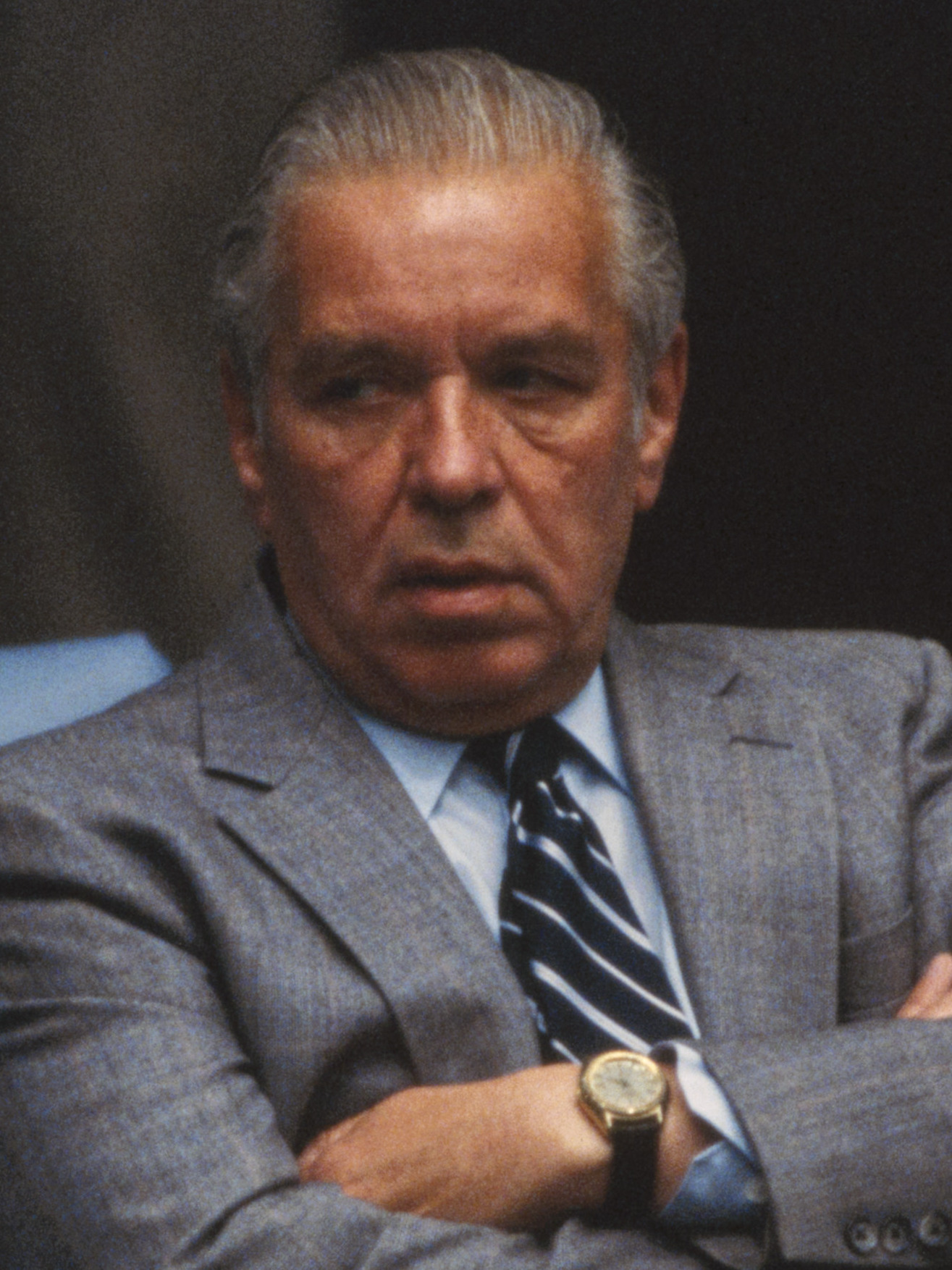
- Troyanovsky in 1983

Soviet Ambassador to China
- In office 1986–1990
- Preceded by: Ilya Shcherbakov
- Succeeded by: Nikolai Solovyov

Permanent Representative of the Soviet Union to the United Nations
- In office 1976–1986
- Preceded by: Yakov Malik
- Succeeded by: Yuri Dubinin

Soviet Ambassador to Japan
- In office 1967–1976
- Preceded by: Vladimir Vinogradov
- Succeeded by: Dmitry Polyansky

Personal details
- Born: November 24, 1919 Moscow, Russian SFSR
- Died: December 21, 2003 (aged 84) Moscow, Russia
- Party: Communist Party of Soviet Union
- Awards: Honored Employee of the Diplomatic Service of the Russian Federation;

Oleg Alexandrovich Troyanovsky (24 November 1919 – 21 December 2003) was ambassador of the Soviet Union to Japan and China and was the Soviet Permanent Representative to the United Nations (from 1976 to 1986).

Troyanovsky was born into a diplomatic family. His father, Alexander A. Troyanovsky, served as the first Soviet ambassador to the United States from 1934 to 1938 and was also Soviet Ambassador to Japan from 1929 to 1932. Although he was born in Moscow, Oleg attended The American School in Japan; the Sidwell Friends School in Washington, DC; and Swarthmore College in Pennsylvania. At Swarthmore in the 1930s, Troyanovsky allegedly recruited his American classmate Stephen Laird as a Soviet spy.

Troyanovsky returned to the Soviet Union to complete his education at the Moscow Institute for Foreign Languages and Moscow University. He spent two years as a soldier in the Red Army. In summer 1945, Troyanovsky worked as an interpreter at the London Conference that produced the London Agreement (August 8, 1945) by which the Soviet Union, the U.S., the United Kingdom, and France created the International Military Tribunal to try Nazi war criminals at Nuremberg. As a Soviet Foreign Ministry official, Troyanovsky also worked as a foreign policy assistant and interpreter for Soviet leader Joseph Stalin and adviser to Nikita Khrushchev.

Troyanovsky served as the Soviet ambassador to Japan before he was appointed to the United Nations. In 1980, two members of a dissident Marxist group sneaked into the UN Security Council chamber and threw red paint on Troyanovsky and US Ambassador William vanden Heuvel. The Soviet responded, "Better red than dead." In 1983, when listening to the recording of Soviet fighter pilots shooting down Korean Air Flight 007 jumbo jet near Moneron Island that killed carrying 269 people, Troyanovsky remained poker-faced and impassive.

From 1986 to 1990, he held his final diplomatic post as the ambassador to China. Troyanovsky spent his retirement years working on his memoirs and giving lectures in Russia and abroad.
