= List of ambassadors of Russia to Norway =

Ambassador of the Russian Federation to the Kingdom of Norway
- Den Russiske Føderasjons Ekstraordinære og Befullmektigede Ambassadør i Kongeriket Norge
- Emblem of the Russian Foreign Ministry
- Incumbent; Nikolai Korchunov since 1 October 2024
- Ministry of Foreign Affairs; Embassy of Russia in Oslo
- Style: His Excellency; The Honourable
- Reports to: Minister of Foreign Affairs
- Seat: Oslo
- Appointer: President of Russia
- Term length: At the pleasure of the president
- Website: Embassy of Russia in Norway

The ambassador of Russia to Norway is the official representative of the president and the government of the Russian Federation to the king and the government of Norway.

The ambassador and his staff work at large in the Russian embassy in Oslo. There are consulates general in Kirkenes and Barentsburg, Svalbard. The current Russian ambassador to Norway is Nikolai Korchunov, incumbent since 1 October 2024.

== History of diplomatic relations ==
For much of the sixteenth to nineteenth centuries, Norway was part of larger political entities, as Denmark–Norway between 1537 and 1814, and the United Kingdoms of Sweden and Norway between 1814 and 1905. With the dissolution of the union between Norway and Sweden in 1905, the Russian Empire became one of the first countries to recognise the newly independent Norway. A diplomatic mission was opened in the capital, then named Kristiania, and starting from the first representative, Anatoly Krupensky, ambassadors were exchanged for the next twelve years. Representation was maintained following the February Revolution in 1917 which brought the Russian Provisional Government, and following the October Revolution later that year, Norway recognised the Russian Soviet Federative Socialist Republic. Representatives were changed after the establishment of the Soviet Union in 1922. In 1940, Norway was invaded and occupied by German forces, causing a break in diplomatic relations. Following the Axis invasion of the Soviet Union in 1941, and the Soviet entry to the war on the Allied side, diplomatic relations were established with the Norwegian government-in-exile as part of the Soviet Embassy to the Allied Governments, with Aleksandr Bogomolov serving as ambassador.

With the German defeat and the return of the government to Norway, Nikolai Kuznetsov was appointed the new ambassador to Norway. Relations were maintained through the rest of the existence of the Soviet Union. With the dissolution of the Soviet Union in 1991, Norway was the first western state to recognise the Russian Federation as its successor state, on 16 December 1991. The incumbent Soviet ambassador, Anatoly Tishchenko, continued in post as the Russian ambassador until 1995.

== List of representatives of Russia to Norway (1905–present) ==
=== Russian Empire to Norway (1905–1917) ===
Name	Title	Appointment	Termination	Notes
Anatoly Krupensky	Envoy	19 November 1905	1912	
Sergey Arsenyev	Envoy	1912	1914	
Konstantin Gulkevich	Envoy	1914	3 March 1917	

=== Russian Provisional Government to Norway (1917) ===
Name	Title	Appointment	Termination	Notes
Dmitry Kotzebue-Pilar von Pilau	Chargé d'affaires	1917	1917	

=== Russian Soviet Federative Socialist Republic to Norway (1917–1922) ===
Name	Title	Appointment	Termination	Notes
Vatslav Vorovsky	Diplomatic representative	November 1917	1919	
Lev Mikhailovich Mikhaylov	Diplomatic representative	7 October 1921	30 June 1922	
Jakob Suritz	Diplomatic representative	29 May 1922	30 December 1922	

=== Soviet Union to Norway (1922–1991) ===
Name	Title	Appointment	Termination	Notes
Jakob Suritz	Diplomatic representative	30 December 1922	27 April 1923	
Alexandra Kollontai	Chargé d'affaires before 18 August 1924; Plenipotentiary representative after 18 August 1924	10 March 1924	4 March 1926	Credentials presented on 8 September 1924
Aleksandr Makar	Plenipotentiary representative	4 March 1926	25 October 1927	Credentials presented on 20 April 1926
Alexandra Kollontai	Plenipotentiary representative	25 October 1927	20 July 1930	Credentials presented on 24 November 1927
Alexander Bekzadyan	Plenipotentiary representative	30 October 1930	17 November 1934	Credentials presented on 3 January 1931
Ignaty Yakubovich	Plenipotentiary representative	17 November 1934	26 December 1937	Credentials presented on 11 January 1935
Vladimir Nikonov	Plenipotentiary representative	26 December 1937	3 September 1939	Credentials presented on 8 March 1938
Viktor Plotnikov	Plenipotentiary representative	1 October 1939	26 June 1940	Credentials presented on 17 October 1939
Invasion and occupation of Norway - Diplomatic relations interrupted (1940-1941)
Aleksandr Bogomolov	Ambassador	21 August 1941	30 November 1943	To the Norwegian government-in-exile as part of the Soviet Embassy to the Allied Governments; Credentials presented on 9 October 1941
Viktor Lebedev	Ambassador	30 November 1943	6 January 1945	To the Norwegian government-in-exile as part of the Soviet Embassy to the Allied Governments; Credentials presented on 26 January 1944
Nikolai Kuznetsov	Ambassador	19 June 1945	8 June 1947	Credentials presented on 5 July 1945
Sergey Afanasyev	Ambassador	8 June 1947	27 January 1954	Credentials presented on 8 July 1947
Georgy Arkadyev	Ambassador	27 January 1954	26 April 1956	Credentials presented on 20 April 1954
Mikhail Gribanov	Ambassador	26 April 1956	20 January 1962	Credentials presented on 5 June 1956
Nikolai Lunkov	Ambassador	20 January 1962	18 January 1968	Credentials presented on 6 March 1962
Sergey Romanovsky	Ambassador	18 January 1968	2 April 1975	Credentials presented on 27 February 1968
Yury Kirichenko	Ambassador	2 April 1975	20 February 1982	Credentials presented on 6 May 1975
Dmitry Polyansky	Ambassador	20 February 1982	26 March 1987	Credentials presented on 20 April 1982
Aleksandr Teterin	Ambassador	26 March 1987	14 June 1990	
Anatoly Tishchenko	Ambassador	13 September 1990	25 December 1991	

=== Russian Federation to Norway (1991–present) ===
Name	Title	Appointment	Termination	Notes
Anatoly Tishchenko	Ambassador	25 December 1991	4 January 1995	
Yury Fokin	Ambassador	4 January 1995	6 June 1997	
Vladimir Kvitsinsky	Ambassador	23 July 1997	16 December 2003	
Aleksandr Panov	Ambassador	29 April 2004	20 June 2006	
Sergey Andreyev	Ambassador	20 June 2006	20 July 2010	
Vyacheslav Pavlovsky	Ambassador	20 July 2010	5 May 2016	
Teimuraz Ramishvili	Ambassador	11 October 2016	1 October 2024	
Nikolai Korchunov	Ambassador	1 October 2024		Credentials presented on 14 November 2024
