= Yakov Malik =

Soviet diplomat (1906–1980)

- Яков Малик
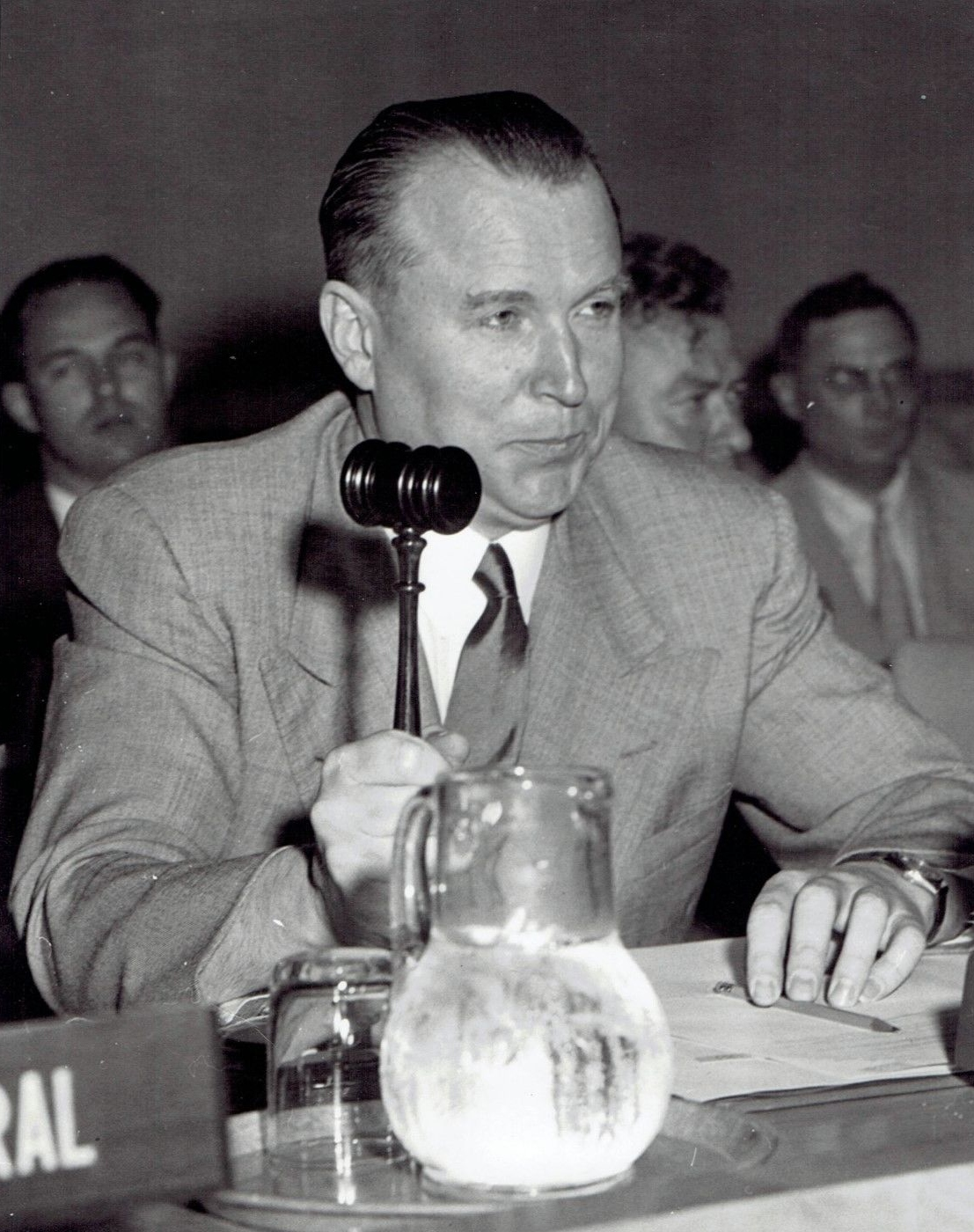
- Malik in 1952

Permanent Representative of the Soviet Union to the United Nations
- In office 1968 – November 1976
- Leader: Leonid Brezhnev (Note: As General Secretary of the Communist Party of the Soviet Union)
- Secretary-General: Kurt Waldheim
- Preceded by: Nikolai Fedorenko
- Succeeded by: Oleg Troyanovsky
- In office May 1948 – October 1952
- Leader: Joseph Stalin
- Secretary-General: Trygve Lie
- Preceded by: Andrey Gromyko
- Succeeded by: Valerian Zorin

Personal details
- Born: Yakov Alexandrovich Malik; 6 December 1906 Zmiiv, Kharkov Governorate, Russian Empire (Note: Currently territory of Ukraine.)
- Died: 11 February 1980 (aged 73) Moscow, Russian SFSR, Soviet Union
- Party: Communist Party of the Soviet Union (1930–1980)
- Education: National University of Kharkiv
- Profession: Diplomat
- Awards: Order of Lenin; Medal "For Valiant Labour in the Great Patriotic War 1941–1945"; Order of the Red Banner of Labour

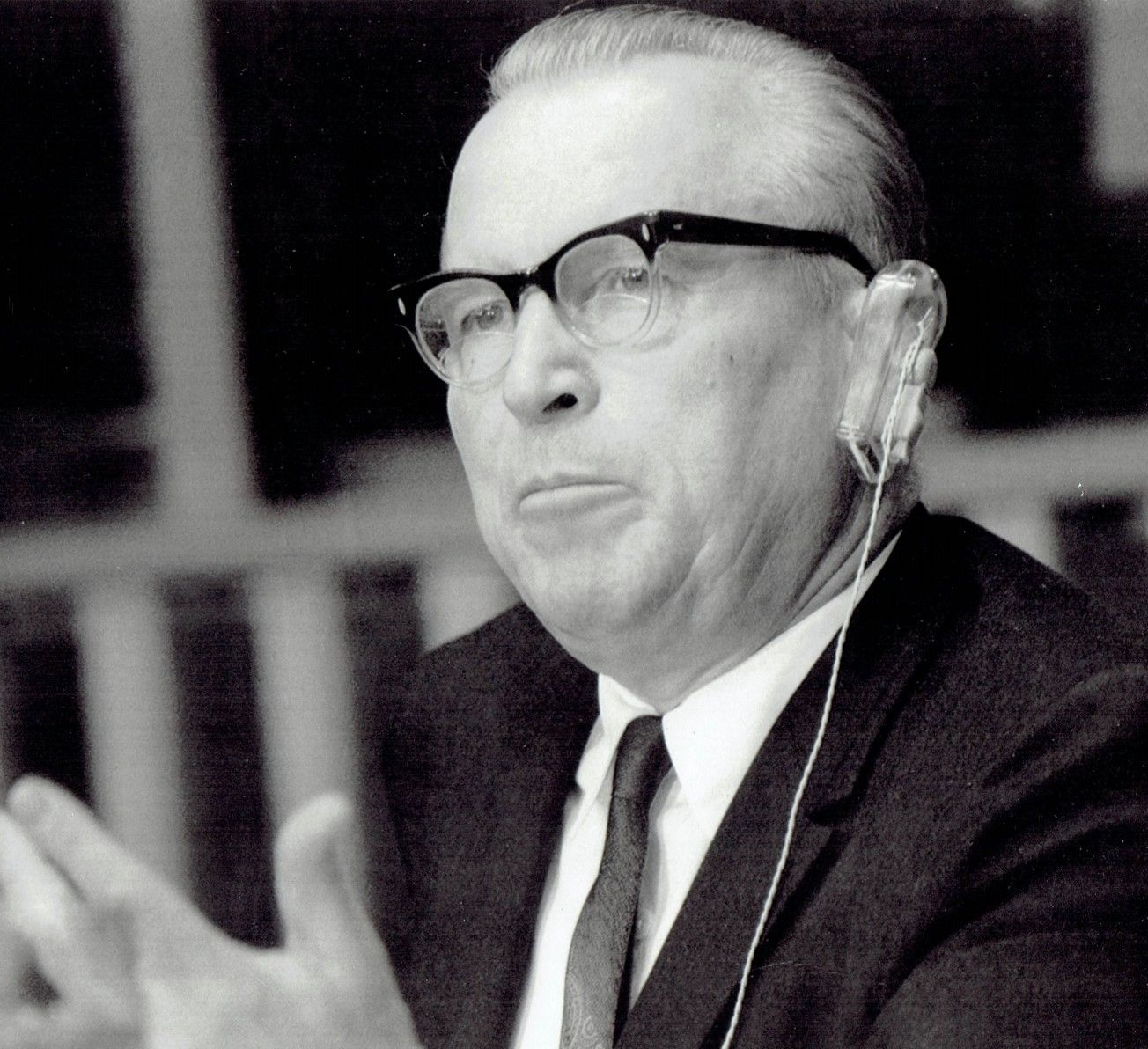
Yakov Malik in 1970

Yakov Aleksandrovich Malik (Russian: Я́ков Алекса́ндрович Ма́лик; 19 December [O.S. 6 December] 1906 – 11 February 1980) was a Soviet diplomat.

== Biography ==
Born in Ostroverkhivka village, Kharkov Governorate to a peasant family, Malik was educated at Kharkiv Institute of National Economy (1930). Then, he worked as an economist and as a Communist Party functionary in Kharkiv, and from 1935 in the Foreign Affairs service in Moscow. He served as Ambassador in Japan from 1942 until 9 August 1945, when the Soviet government declared war on the Japanese Empire. Malik was the Soviet ambassador to the United Nations from 1948 to 1952, and from 1968 to 1976.

At the time of the United Nations Security Council Resolution 82 on 25 June 1950, Malik was boycotting the presence of a Nationalist Chinese representative. His absence enabled the resolution to pass unanimously with a 9–0 vote.

On the floor of the United Nations on 23 June 1951, he proposed an armistice in the Korean War between Red China and North Korea on one hand, and South Korea, the United States, and other United Nations forces on the other.

Malik is also well known for presenting the USSR's justifications for the occupation of Czechoslovakia at the Security Council in August 1968. He vetoed the two resolutions regarding the invasion (resolution requesting the liberation of the arrested Czechoslovak politicians and the removal of the communist armies from Czechoslovakia and the resolution requiring the selection of Special Envoy to Czechoslovakia).

In 1955, as Soviet ambassador to the United Kingdom, he switched on the Blackpool Illuminations.

From 1967 to 1971 he was the head of the Africa department of the Soviet Ministry of Foreign Affairs. During this time he initiated the covert operation Bukran, which established a spy network in several African countries.

== Notes ==
Diplomatic posts
Preceded by Andrey Gromyko	Permanent Representative of the Soviet Union to the United Nations; 1948–1952	Succeeded by Valerian Zorin
Preceded by Nikolai Fedorenko	Permanent Representative of the Soviet Union to the United Nations; 1968–1976	Succeeded by Oleg Troyanovsky
