= Evgeny Bazhanov =

Russian political scientist (1946–2023)

Evgeny P. Bazhanov
- Born: 6 November 1946; Lviv, Ukrainian SSR, USSR
- Died: 18 September 2023 (aged 76)
- Occupations: Political scientist, historian, educator, writer, diplomat
- Website: Website of the Diplomatic Academy of the MFA of Russia

Evgeny Petrovich Bazhanov (Russian: Евгений Петрович Бажанов; 6 November 1946 – 18 September 2023) was a Russian political scientist, historian, lecturer, writer and diplomat who was the President of the Diplomatic Academy of the Ministry of Foreign Affairs of the Russian Federation.

== Career ==
1964–1970 – Student of Moscow State Institute of International relations (MGIMO), majoring in Asian studies and World economy.

1968–1970 – An exchange student at Nanyang University (Singapore) upgrading knowledge of Northern (Mandarin) and Shanghainese dialects of Chinese language.

1970–1973 – A diplomatic officer at the Foreign Ministry of the USSR (Southeast Asian and Chinese desks).

1973–1979 – Consul of the USSR Consulate General in San Francisco (USA).

1973 – Successfully defended PHD theses at the Institute of the Far East, USSR Academy of Sciences. The title: "Singapore in the Policies of China and Major Western Powers".

1979–1981 – Mid-career training at the Diplomatic Academy, USSR Foreign Ministry.

1981–1985 – Counsellor of the USSR Embassy in Beijing, China.

1985–1991 – Senior staff member of the Central Committee of the Soviet Communist Party, Advisor to Mikhail Gorbachev on Asia-Pacific region.

1988 – Successfully defended State Doctoral dissertation at the Institute of Oriental studies, the USSR Academy of Sciences, awarded the degree of State Doctor. The title of the dissertation: "China's Foreign Policy, 1949-1987".

1991–2011 – Vice President of the Diplomatic Academy, the Russian Foreign Ministry.

Since 2003 – Professor of International Relations at the Russian Friendship University.

April–October 2011 – Acting President of the Diplomatic Academy, RFM.

10 October 2011 – The General Meeting of the personnel of the Diplomatic Academy elected Evgeny Bazhanov President of the academy. On 11 October 2011 he was officially appointed to this position by Foreign Minister of the Russian Federation Sergei Lavrov for five years (up to 10 October 2016).

== Academic activities ==
Evgeny Bazhanov delivered more than 550 lectures in over 150 Universities, Colleges and Research Centers in 22 countries, including Harvard, Columbia, Stanford and G. Washington Universities, University of California, Rand, Cambridge, Oxford, Beijing, Tokyo, Seoul National, Australian National Universities, over 250 presentations at multinational conferences and more than 900 interviews to TV, radio, newspapers and magazines in 30 countries.

Bazhanov was the academic advisor of 53 PhD dissertations including those by the President of South Korea Kim Dae-jung, Prime Minister of Kazakhstan Kassym-Jomart Tokayev, Foreign Minister of Kyrgyzstan Alikbek Jekshenkulov, Ambassadors to Russia of Yemen, United Arab Emirates, Palestine and many prominent Russian politicians, educators and diplomats.

Bazhanov was author of 41 books, more than 110 book chapters and parts and over 1000 articles on Chinese, Korean, Japanese, ASEAN, Asia-Pacific, US, European, Middle Eastern affairs, foreign policies and domestic issues of Russia, CIS countries (published in Russia, USA, ROK, PRC, Taiwan, Japan, Australia, Hong Kong, New Zealand, Germany, Britain, Singapore, Thailand, Israel, Egypt, Spain, Italy, Turkey, Austria, Iran, Switzerland, Yugoslavia, Syria). Editor of 90 books and other publications, member of editorial boards of several magazines. In 1994 founded the Research Institute for Contemporary International Studies and headed it until 2006.

== Personal life and death ==
His father, Peter I. Bazhanov (1912–1975) served as mayor of the city of Sochi from 1957 to 1971. He was a prominent specialist in the field of electricity, as well as an inventor, writer, artist. His mother, Anna Z. Bazhanova (1914–1982), was an electrical engineer, and a specialist in city-planning.

Evgeny Bazhanov was married to Natalia E. Bazhanova, a prominent orientalist, Korea specialist, political scientist, historian, economist, teacher, and diplomat. She was also the author of numerous books and articles, published in Russia and various foreign countries, on Russia, Korea, China, USA, Europe, Middle East.

Evgeny Bazhanov died on 18 September 2023, at the age of 76.

== Published books ==
1. Singapore in the Policies of the West and China. Moscow: The Institute of the Far Eastern Studies, 1972.
2. The Motivating Forces of American Policy Towards China. Moscow: Nauka, 1982.
3. The Gilded Ghetto. (Chinese, Korean and Japanese Communities in the USA). Moscow: Nauka, 1983 (co-author Natalia Bazhanova).
4. The Last Frontier. (American Society in the 1970s). Moscow: Politisdat, 1984 (co-author Natalia Bazhanova).
5. The USA in the Foreign Policy of China. Moscow: Oriental Studies Institute, 1986.
6. China and the World. Moscow: Mezdunarodnye Otnoshenia, 1990.ISBN 5-7133-0161-3
7. The USSR and the Asian-Pacific Region. Moscow: Znanie, 1991.ISBN 5-07-002090-0
8. Soviet Foreign Policy under Gorbachev. Taipei: Zhongyang Ribao, 1992.
9. Russia and Korea. Seoul: Seoul Sihnmun, 1992. (co-author Natalia Bazhanova).
10. Russia and Taiwan. Köln: Bundesinstitut für ostwissenschaftliche und internationale Studien (BIOst), 1996.ISSN 0435-7183
11. Russia's Changing Foreign Policy. Köln:Bundesinstitut für ostwissenschaftliche und internationale Studien (BIOst), 1996.ISSN 0435-7183
12. The Most Mysterious War of the XXth Century (Korean Conflict, 1950–1953), Seoul: Youl Rim, 1998 (co-author Natalia Bazhanova).
13. Russian-Chinese Relations: Problems and Prospects. Moscow: Nauchnya Kniga, 1999.
14. The DPRK Reports (NN 1–21), Center for Nonproliferation Studies, The Monterey Institute of International Studies. Monterey, California, USA, 1996–2000.
15. Evolution of the Russian Foreign Policy 1991–1999. Moscow: Nauchnaya Kniga, 1999.
16. International Relations on the Eve of the 21st Century. Moscow: Nauchnaya Kniga, 1999.
17. Transformation of Russia: Yesterday, Today and Prospects for the Future. Moscow: Nauchnaya Kniga, 1999.
18. Russia's Priorities in the Changing World. Moscow: Nauchnaya Kniga, 2000.
19. Studies in Contemporary International Development. Volume 1. Moscow: Nauchnaya Kniga, 2001–2002.ISBN 5-7671-0062-4
20. Studies in Contemporary International Development. Volume 2. Moscow: Nauchnaya Kniga, 2001–2002.ISBN 5-7671-0005-5
21. Studies in Contemporary International Development. Volume 3. Moscow: Nauchnaya Kniga, 2001–2002.ISBN 5-7671-0047-0
22. Contemporary World. Moscow: Izvestia, 2004.ISBN 5-206-00634-3
23. America: Yesterday and Today. Volume 1. Moscow: Izvestia, 2005.ISBN 5-206-00664-5
24. America: Yesterday and Today. Volume 2. Moscow: Izvestia, 2005.ISBN 5-206-00665-3
25. Academic Papers – 2006. China: Yesterday and Today. Moscow: Nauchnaya Kniga, 2006.
26. China from the Middle Kingdom to a Superpower of the XXI Century. Moscow: Izvestia, 2007.ISBN 5-206-00704-8
27. Oriental Express with Stops in the West. The Eyewitness' Notes. Moscow: Vostok-Zapad, 2008 (co-author Natalia Bazhanova).ISBN 978-5-478-00862-8
28. Edible Dragons. Mysteries of the Chinese Cuisine. Moscow: Vostok-Zapad, 2008 (co-author Natalia Bazhanova).ISBN 978-5-478-00919-9
29. Chinese Riddles. On Chinese Language, Characters, Calligraphy, and the View of the World "Through Characters". Moscow: Vostok-Zapad, 2008 (co-author Natalia Bazhanova).ISBN 978-5-478-00918-2
30. A Country of Merry Gods. Religious World of the Chinese People. Moscow: Vostok-Zapad, 2008 (co-author Natalia Bazhanova).ISBN 978-5-478-01189-5
31. France. Both Quazimodo and Coco Chanel. Itinerary. Moscow: Vostok-Zapad, 2009 (co-author Natalia Bazhanova).ISBN 978-5-478-01222-9
32. Where is Mankind Headed? Trends in International Relations in the XXI century. Moscow: Vostok-Zapad, 2009 (co-author Natalia Bazhanova).ISBN 978-5-478-01272-4
33. Wisdom of the Orient and the West. World Folklore. Moscow: Vostok-Zapad, 2010 (co-authors Peter Bazhanov and Natalia Bazhanova).ISBN 978-5-478-01291-5
34. The Multipolar World. Moscow: Vostok-Zapad, 2010 (co-author Natalia Bazhanova).ISBN 978-5-478-01296-0
35. Sketches of Korea. Moscow: Vostok-Zapad, 2010 (co-author Natalia Bazhanova).ISBN 978-5-478-01310-3
36. International Relations in the XXI Century. Moscow: Vostok-Zapad, 2011 (co-author Natalia Bazhanova).ISBN 978-5-478-01324-0
37. Chinese Mosaic. Moscow: Vostok-Zapad, 2011 (co-author Natalia Bazhanova).ISBN 978-5-478-01325-7
38. Peace and War. Moscow: Vostok-Zapad, 2011 (co-author Natalia Bazhanova).ISBN 978-5-478-01333-2
39. Italy, Both Sad and Merry. Travel Notes. Moscow: Vostok-Zapad, 2011 (co-author Natalia Bazhanova).ISBN 978-5-478-01338-7
40. The Clash and the Dialogue of Civilizations. Moscow: Ves Mir (co-author Natalia Bazhanova). ISBN 978-5-7777-0561-7
41. Wisdom of the Orient and the West. World Folklore. Moscow: Ves Mir (co-authors Peter Bazhanov and Natalia Bazhanova). ISBN 9785478012915

== Memberships, Awards and Recognitions ==
- The USA Political Science Association, since 1973.
- Northern California World Affairs Council, since 1973.
- The USA Association for Asian Studies, since 1973.
- Prize for the best articles in 1988, "New Times Journal" (Moscow, the USSR).
- Association "For Dialogue and Cooperation in the Asia-Pacific Region", Member of the Presidium, Russia, since 1991.
- Chairman of the Dissertation Committee of the Diplomatic academy, RFM, since 1993.
- World Ecological Academy, Moscow, since 1993.
- Journalistic prize for 1993. "Zhongyang Zhibao", newspaper, Taipei, Taiwan, 1994.
- Academy of Humanitarian Studies. Moscow, since 1997.
- Meritorious Scholar of Russia, awarded by the Decree of Russia's President Boris Yeltsin, 23 June 1997.
- Honorary Professor of the People's University. Beijing, China, 1999.
- Russia's Association of International Studies. Member of the Presidium. Moscow, Russia, since 1999.
- Member of the Consultative Board of Publishing Authority of the G. Marshall Center. Garmisсh Partenkirchen, Bavaria, Germany, since 2000.
- A Certificate of Gratitude by the Russian Foreign Ministry "For a significant contribution to the creation of the Foreign Policy Concept of the Russian Federation". 2001, 11 January, No.282.
- A Founding member of the Association of C.I.S. and Baltic studies. Moscow, 2002, 27 February.
- Bureau of Scientific Council of the Russian Academy of Sciences. Moscow, since 2002.
- Vice-president of the Institute for Applied International Studies, Moscow, since 2002.
- Academic Council of the Center for Contemporary Korean Studies. Moscow, since 2002.
- Member of the auditorial board of "The Pacific Focus" journal. Minnesota University, USA, since 2004.
- Presidium member of the Russian Council for Cooperation and Security in Asia- Pacific Region, since 2004.
- Inaugural member of the International Biographical Center Leading Scientists of the World 2006. IBC, Cambridge, England, since 2006.
- A Certificate of Honour of the Russian Friendship University for "A significant personal contribution to the training top –quality specialists", 2006, May.
- Experts’ Council of the Highest Attestation Commission of the Russian Federation on Political Science. Moscow, 2006–2013.
- Advisory Council of the Russian Minister of Foreign Affairs Sergei Lavrov. Moscow, since 2006.
- A Certificate of Honour of the Russian Foreign Ministry "For the long-term, honest and highly-qualified service at the Russian Foreign Ministry". 2007.
- Committee of the Russian Foreign Ministry on publications in the mass media, since 2007.
- Editorial board of the journal "Herald of the Russian Friendship University". Moscow, since 2007.
- Honorary Doctor of the Kirgizia Slavic University, Bishkek, Kirgizia, 2009, 20 October.
- Chairman of the editorial board of the journal "The Diplomatic Service". Moscow, since 2009.
- The Honorary Diplomat of the Russian Foreign Ministry. The title was conferred by the order of Russian Foreign Minister Sergei Lavrov, 2011, 7 November.
- Order "For Services to the Fatherland". Decree of the Russian President Dmitry Medvedev of 2012, 1 May.
- Honorary Counsellor to the All-China History society. Beijing, China. Elected 2012, 25 September.
- Honorary Professor of the Moscow International Highest School of business, Moscow, since 2012.
- Member of the Board of Highest School of geopolitics and applied sciences. Rome, Italy, since 2012.
- Member of the Consultative Council of the Diplomatic Academy of the Republic of Korea. Seoul, Republic of Korea, since 2012.
- Vice-president of the Russia-China Friendship Association, since 2013.
- Member of the editorial board of the "Geopolitical Journal", Moscow, since 2014.
- State medal of Mongolia "Nairamdal" ("Friendship"). By Decree of the Mongolian President Elbegdorzh of 2014, 25 February, No.23.
- A Certificate of Gratitude of the President of the Russian Federation Vladimir Putin. Decree of the RF President of President of 2014, 11 April, No.110-RP.
