= Nikolai Fedorenko =

Soviet philologist, orientalist, statesman and academic (1912–2000)

- Николай Федоренко
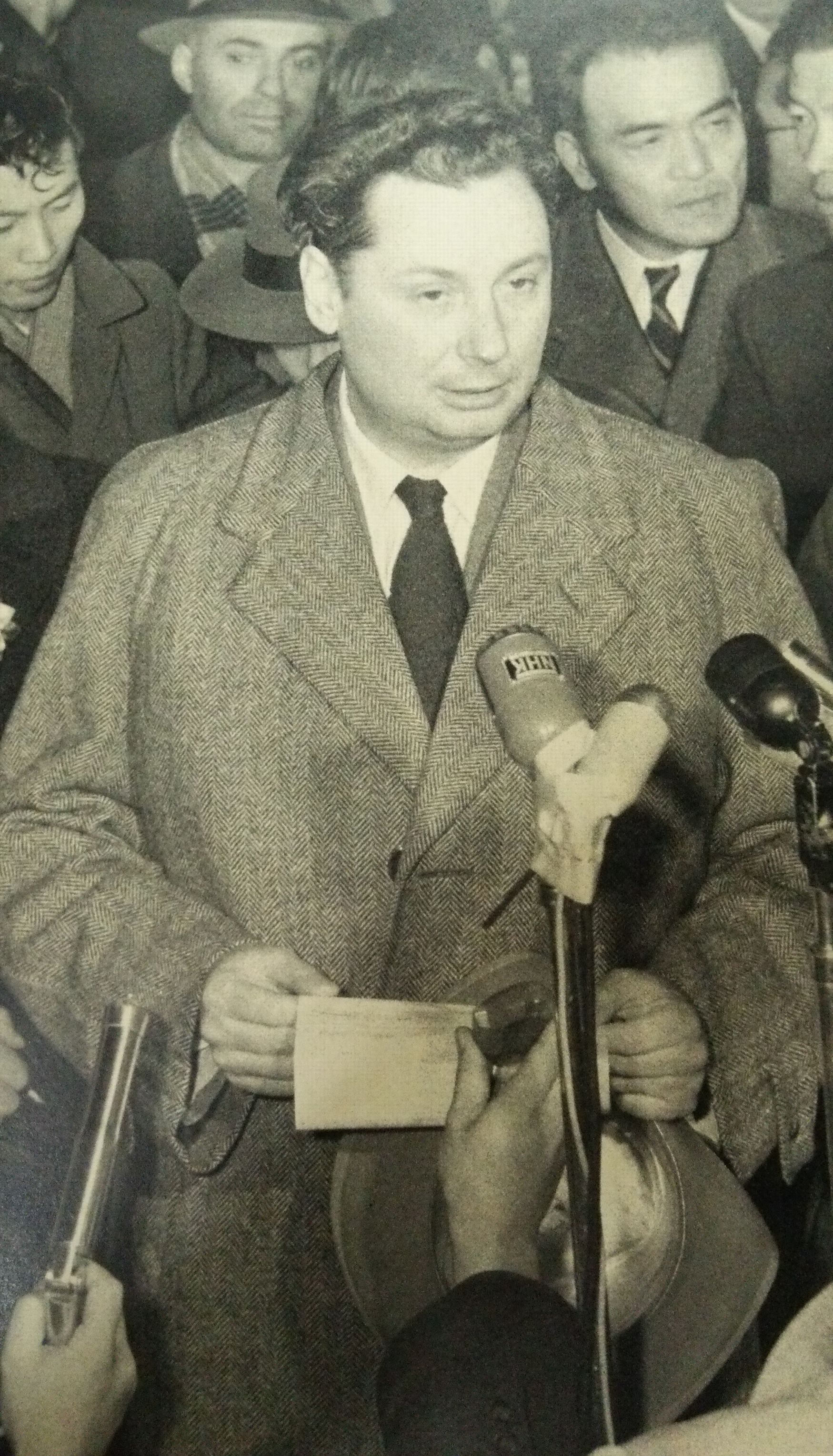

Personal details
- Born: 27 October [O.S. 14 October] 1912
- Died: 2 October 2000 (aged 87) Moscow
- Education: Moscow Institute of Oriental Studies
- Occupation: Diplomat, philologist, orientalist
- Awards: Order of Lenin, Order of the October Revolution, Order of the Red Banner of Labour, Order of Friendship of Peoples, Order of the Badge of Honour, Medal "For Labour Valour", Jubilee Medal "In Commemoration of the 100th Anniversary of the Birth of Vladimir Ilyich Lenin"

Nikolai Trofimovich Fedorenko (Russian: Николай Трофимович Федоренко; 9 November [O.S. 27 October] 1912 – October 2, 2000) was a Soviet philologist, orientalist, statesman, public figure, professor (1953), and corresponding member of the Soviet Academy of Sciences (1958).

== Biography ==
Nikolai Fedorenko graduated from Moscow Institute of Oriental Studies in 1937. In 1954, he received a rank of extraordinary and plenipotentiary ambassador of the USSR. In 1955–1958, Nikolai Fedorenko was a deputy foreign minister and then Soviet ambassador to Japan (1958–1962), where he succeeded the late Ivan Tevosian. In 1963–1968, he was appointed Permanent Representative of the USSR to the United Nations and Soviet representative at the United Nations Security Council. In 1970–1988, Nikolai Fedorenko was the editor-in-chief of the Foreign Literature magazine.

Nikolai Fedorenko authored a number of works on the history of Chinese and Japanese culture, Chinese classical and modern literature. He was an honorary member of the Tokyo Sinology Institute (1961) and honorary academician of the Florentine Art Academy (1975). Nikolai Fedorenko was awarded two Orders of Lenin, four other orders, and numerous medals. He also acted as interpreter for Joseph Stalin during Mao Zedong's visit to Soviet Union in 1949.
