= Konstantin Yurenev =

Russian revolutionary, Soviet politician and diplomat

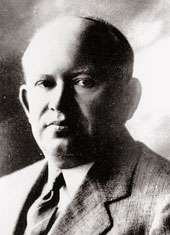
Konstantin Yurenev

Konstantin Konstantinovich Yurenev (Russian: Константи́н Константи́нович Юре́нев), also known as Konstantin Konstantinovich Krotovsky (Russian: Константин Константинович Кротовский) (1888 – 1 August 1938), was a Russian revolutionary, Soviet politician and diplomat.

== Life and career ==
=== Early revolutionary career ===
Yurenev was born at Dvinsk station on the Riga-Orlov railway in the family of a railway watchman. He joined the Russian Social Democratic Labour Party (RSDLP) in 1905 and later its Bolshevik faction in 1906. In 1908, he was arrested and sentenced to three years' exile in Arkhangelsk. When his term of exile was completed, he settled in St Petersburg, but split with the Bolsheviks their leader Vladimir Lenin pronounced that all Mensheviks were to be expelled from the RSDLP. In 1913, he co-founded the 'Inter-Borough Organisation' or Mezhraiontsy, who were neither Bolsheviks nor Mensheviks, but were inspired by the writings of Leon Trotsky. Yurenev was arrested, but acquitted at his trial in 1916 for lack of evidence. Anticipating that the prosecutor would appeal, he hid out for two months, then moved to Simferopol, where he was arrested and drafted into the Imperial Russian Army, but absconded after about ten days and returned to Petrograd (St Petersburg) to live illegally. In 1917, he played an active part in the February Revolution, and was elected to the executive of the Petrograd (St Petersburg) soviet.

=== Mezhraiontsy ===
Yurenev led the faction within the Mezhraiontsy who opposed merger with the Bolsheviks, whose organisation they considered too centralised and undemocratic, but in July 1917, after Trotsky had insisted that the merger go ahead, he joined the Russian Social Democratic Labour Party (Bolsheviks), and played a leading role in the Bolshevik Revolution as a member of the Military Revolutionary Committee of the Petrograd Soviet, and Chief of Staff of the Red Guards. He was in favour of creating a coalition government with other socialist parties, yet despite his concerns about one party rule, he helped found the Red Army as a member of the People's Commissariat for Military Affairs of the Russian Soviet Federative Socialist Republic from February 1918, and head of the All-Russian Bureau of Military Commissars, a predecessor of the Political Directorate of the Soviet Red Army from April 1918.

=== Soviet official and diplomat ===
During the Ninth Congress of the RCP (b) in March 1920, Yurenev again raised his long-held complaints about Bolshevik organisational methods. Possibly for that reason, he spent the rest of his career in positions well removed from the centre of power.

From May 1920 to May 1921 he was the chairman of the executive committee of the Kursk Governorate Soviet. From 16 May 1921 until 1 February 1922 he was Plenipotentiary Representative of the Russian Soviet Federative Socialist Republic in the Bukharan People's Soviet Republic. After serving in Bukhara, from 1 February 1922 to 14 February 1923 he was Soviet Russia's Plenipotentiary Representative in Latvia. After his posting to Latvia, he was appointed as diplomatic representative of the Soviet Union to Czechoslovakia, and served in Prague from 14 February 1923 until 3 March 1924.

==== Dinner with Mussolini ====
On 7 March 1924, Yurenev was appointed Plenipotentiary Representative of the Soviet Union to Italy. According to Alexander Barmine, who worked with Yurenev's in Bukhara and in Latvia, and visited him in Italy:

Yurenev maintained in our Italian embassy a way of life worthy of the early days of the Revolution but which elsewhere had been pretty well forgotten. The ambassador, his family, the typists, and porters all used the same dining room and ate the same food. Outside business hours, the rules of 'seniority', the sense of hierarchic distinctions, were reduced to a minimum. In consequence, Yurenev was surrounded by an atmosphere of comradely devotion much more precious than the respect to which his official position entitled him.

In July 1924, he hosted a banquet in the embassy for Benito Mussolini, only a month after the murder of Giacomo Matteotti, which had revolted liberal and communist opinion in Italy. He followed it by inviting Mussolini to a reception to mark the 7th anniversary of the Bolshevik revolution. This provoked a protest from the Central Committee of the Italian Communist Party, and from the Comintern representative in Italy, Jules Humbert-Droz, who demanded Yurenev's dismissal. Alexander Barmine claimed that Yurenev ignored advice from his own staff and from Moscow by entertaining Mussolini, but his actions were in line with Soviet foreign policy, which was to build alliances with the countries that lost out from the Treaty of Versailles. Eventually the complaints reached the Soviet Politburo, which condemned Yurenev's actions organizing the banquet. Yurenev despite trying to defend himself was eventually removed from his position as plenipotentiary representative in Italy and replaced by Platon Krezhentsev, who was more critical of Mussolini's regime.

From 24 April 1925 to 5 August 1927 Yurenev served as the Plenipotentiary Representative of the USSR in Persia; from 1 October 1927 to 24 January 1933 he was Plenipotentiary Representative of the Soviet Union in Austria; from 29 January 1933 until 16 June 1937 he was Plenipotentiary Representative of the Soviet Union in Japan, and from 16 June until 11 October 1937 he was Plenipotentiary Representative of the Soviet Union in Germany.

=== Arrest and death ===
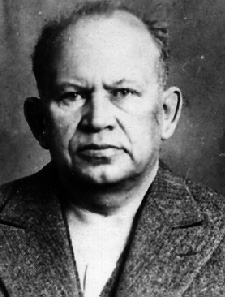
Photo of Yurenev after his arrest by the NKVD in 1937

Yurenev was arrested on 23 September 1937, during the Great Purge. He was named repeatedly during the third Moscow show trial, in March 1938, as an alleged Trotskyite and Japanese spy. And eventually executed on 1 August 1938. He was rehabilitated in 1956.
