= Viktor Kopp =

Russian diplomat

Viktor Leontievich Kopp (Russian: Виктор Леонтьевич Копп) (29 September [O.S. 16 September] 1880, in Yalta – 24 March 1930, in Berlin) was a Russian diplomat active in Germany from 1918 to 1921, and later in Japan, and Sweden.

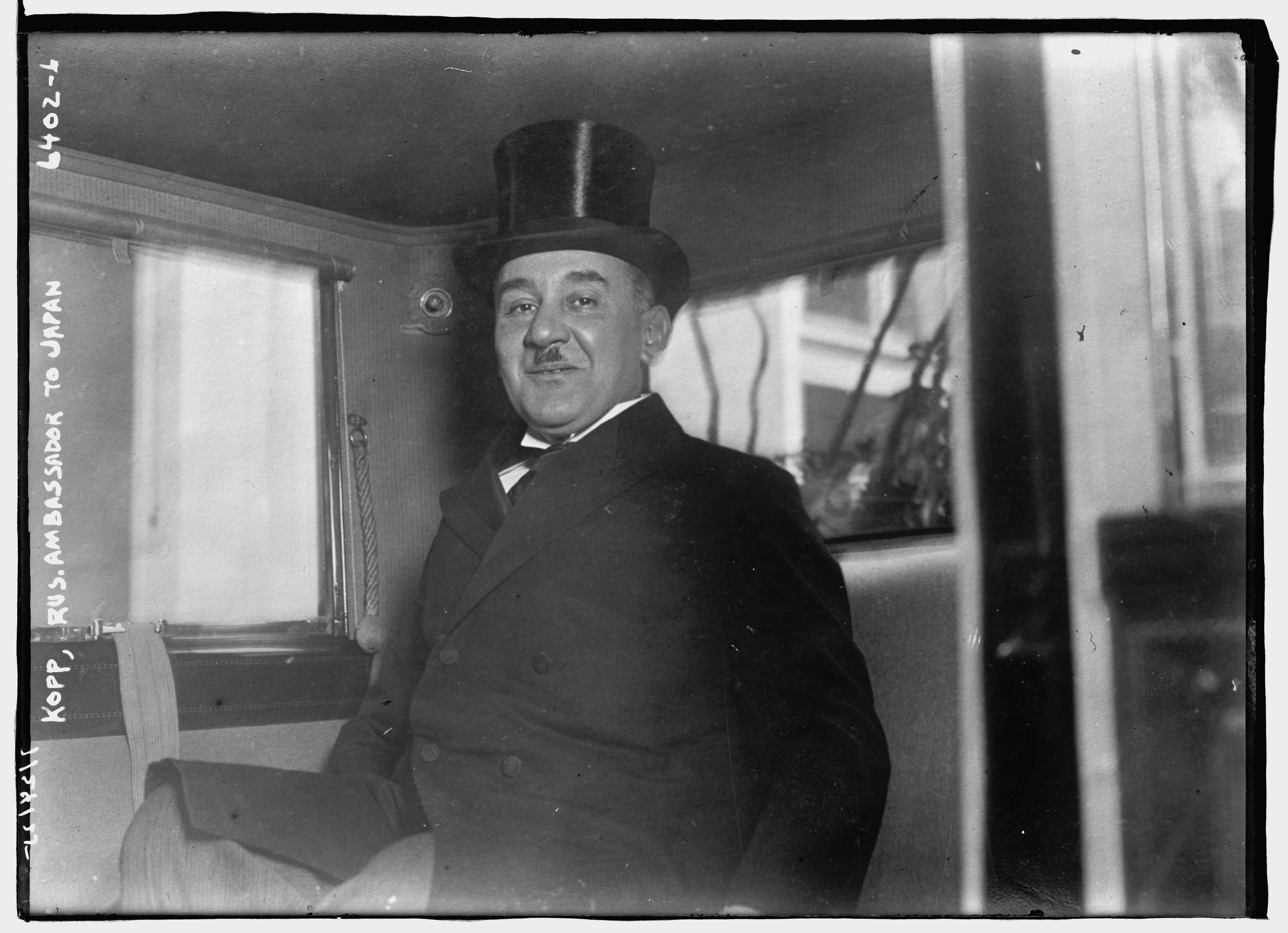
Viktor Kopp in Japan

Born in Yalta into the middle-class family of the Jewish merchant Leon Markovich Kopp and his wife Elka Izrailevna, Kopp became involved in revolutionary circles as a student, and became a professional revolutionary after being expelled from the Kharkov Technological Institute in 1900. Before the Russian Revolution, Kopp was a Menshevik. In 1908, he joined the team who produced the so-called 'Viennese Pravda', edited by Leon Trotsky, which predated the better known Pravda that was the official organ of the Bolshevik faction of the Russian Social Democratic Labour Party. Drafted into the Russian Imperial Army early in the war with Germany, he was captured in 1915, and held in Germany until 1918.

In November 1919, Kopp returned to Germany as the Soviet representative, a year after the first Soviet Ambassador in Berlin, Adolph Joffe had been expelled for using the embassy to ferment revolution. However, his diplomatic credentials were not recognised by the German government until February 1920, and then only for the purpose of negotiating the repatriation of prisoners of war. During 1921, he initiated negotiations under which German firms helped rearm the Soviet Union. Recalled in 1921, he was a senior official in the People's Commissariat of Foreign Affairs for three years, handling sensitive negotiations with Germany, Poland and the Baltic States. In April 1925, he was appointed the first Soviet representative in Tokyo. It is possible that he came under suspicion as Joseph Stalin was taking control of the communist party because of his former association with Trotsky and was removed from Moscow for that reason.

Recalled in May 1926, having reputedly created bad impression with the Japanese, he was replaced by the diplomat Grigori Besedovsky, who later defected to the west, and wrote a memoir in which he described Kopp as "avaricious, brutal, and rough with subordinates." Kopp was the Soviet representative in Sweden from 1927 until his death in 1930.
