= Anastasia Vashukevich =

Russia escort

Anastasia Vashukevich (Russian: Анастасия Вашукевич; born 27 February 1990, Babruysk, Byelorussian SSR), also known as Nastya Rybka (Russian: Настя Рыбка), is a Belarusian escort worker and author who claimed to have evidence linking Russian billionaire Oleg Deripaska and Deputy Prime Minister Sergei Prikhodko to Russian interference in the 2016 U.S. presidential election.

== Early life and family ==
Born Anastasia Kostina (Russian: Анастасия Костина; Belarusian: Настасся Косціна) on 27 February 1990 in Babruysk, Byelorussian SSR and for unknown reasons taken to orphanage, she was later adopted by a widowed forty-years-old woman — a well-known ophthalmologist in Babruisk. She has no siblings.

She attended night school after being expelled from school in ninth grade. She became pregnant when she was 16. She married her son's father and took his surname [Semenchuk] (Russian: Семенчук; Belarusian: Семянчук). She gave birth to their son Yury (Russian: Юрий). while she attended the university in Belarus Mazyr - later she received a degree in biology. She was 18 when she started a romance on the side and got divorced. She then married Nikolai Vashukevich and again changed her surname [now to Vashukevich]. She again separated with Nikolai in 2018 and officially divorced in 2023 with the divorce registered in Belarus.

== US election related photographs, video, and audio recordings ==
During 2016 to 2017, Vashukevich met with Oleg Deripaska at least three times: during August 2016 (Note: On 5 August 2016, two of Deripaska's private jets flew to Molde Airport a remote airport 5 kilometers (3.1 mi) east of Molde in Norway: M-ALAY from Moscow and M-UGIC from Montenegro.) on Deripaska's yacht Elden (Note: Elden (Russian: ЭЛДЕН), the smaller of Deripaska's two yachts, is a 29-meter super luxury yacht. His larger yacht is the 2,000 ton Queen K which is usually seen in warmer climates. According to Alexei Navalny, the actual owner of Elden is Yevgeny Agarkov.) off the coast of Norway (Note: During early August 2013, Deripaska and his yacht Elden stayed in the resort of Sjøgarden at Flatset in Averøy Municipality in Nordmøre Norway.) with Sergei Prikhodko, (Note: According to Navalny, many consider Prikhodko more influential on Russia foreign affairs than Sergei Lavrov.) during September to October 2016 in southern Russia at Deripaska's mansion, and during January 2017 at Lech, Austria, with United States lobbyist Adam Waldman of the firm Endeavor Group. As of January 2019, Vashukevich has written three books about her relationship with Deripaska: Who Wants to Seduce a Billionaire (Russian: Дневник соблазнения миллиардера, или клон для олигарха lit. The Billionaire Seduction Diary, or Clone for the Oligarch) (ISBN 978-5-699-93242-9); Eurotrash, How to Seduce the Rich for the Poor (Russian: Евротрэш. Соблазнение богатых для бедных); and a third unpublished book.

Released in September 2017 in collaboration with Alex Lesley, (Note: Anastasiya Vashukevich is also known as Nastya Rybka and Aleksandr Kirillov (Russian: Александр Кириллов; Belarusian: Аляксандр Кірылаў) is also known as Alex Lesley or Alex Leslie (Russian: Алекс Лесли) (b. 1982 Vitebsk, Byelorussian SSR). Thai police believe that Alexander Kirillov aka Alex Lesley is a Russian.) Vashukevich's book Eurotrash, How to Seduce the Rich for the Poor details her trip to Lech, Austria, in early January 2017 with Oleg Deripaska to meet with Adam Waldman, who through Waldman's firm, Endeavor Group, has been a lobbyist for Deripaska since 2009 (Note: Adam Waldman through his Endeavor Group was hired as counsel for Russian Foreign Minister Sergei Lavrov in 2009-10 to help expedite Oleg Deripaska obtaining a United States visa to travel to the United States. Many payments from Deripaska to Waldman went through numerous offshore shell companies including firms in Jersey, the British Virgin Islands, Belize and firms associated with anonymous ownership Cyprus firms such as the Sea Chaika Corporation, a Deripaska firm that appears in the Panama Papers. In 2010, Carolyn Mansfield was a managing director of the Endeavor Group. Adam Waldman was Oleg Deripaska's attorney from May 8, 2009, to April 5, 2018, and represented Julian Assange pro bono.) and for Julian Assange. (Note: Adam Waldman visited the Ecuadorian embassy in London to meet with Julian Assange nine times during 2017: 12, 13, and 27 January; twice in late March; three times in April; and twice at the end of November 2017.) On 12–13 January 2017, Adam Waldman met with Julian Assange just days after Waldman's Lech, Austria, meeting in a bar at Deripaska's five star Aurelio Hotel with Deripaska and Vashukevich on 7 January 2017. Vashukevich made a video recording with her phone of the 7 January 2017 meeting in the bar.

In her unpublished book, she describes a three-day trip during the fall of 2016 to Deripaska's mansion near Krasnodar where an important-looking man arrived in an all-terrain vehicle to discuss issues with Deripaska. Vashukevich recorded these meetings with her phone hidden behind some books.

Vashukevich said that she was close to Oleg Deripaska, a Russian oligarch with ties to Russian President Vladimir Putin and business links to Paul Manafort. She claimed the recorded voices included Deripaska's discussing the 2016 presidential election with other people, including at least three fluent English speakers who she believed were Americans. (Note: During emails sent 29 and 31 July 2016, Konstantin Kilimnik and Paul Manafort decided to meet in New York City on 2 August 2016. During the evening of the 2 August 2016 Manafort and Kilimnik meeting in the Grand Havana Club at Jared Kushner owned 666 Fifth Avenue, M-ALAY flew from Moscow to Newark, New Jersey, and after the Manafort-Kilimnik meeting it returned the next morning to Moscow on 3–4 August. It then flew to Molde, Norway, on 5 August 2016 while M-UGIC flew from Montenegro to Molde on 5 August 2016, also. Navalny states that Deripaska flew on M-UGIC from Montenegro to Molde and Sergei Prikhodko flew on M-ALAY from Moscow to Molde. Vashukevich believes that others were aboard the flights, too.) On 8 February 2018, Alexei Navalny released a video using material obtained by Vashukevich about an August 2016 meeting between Deripaska and Deputy Prime Minister Sergei Prikhodko in which United States and Russia foreign policy was discussed as well as Prikhodko's friend United States diplomat Victoria Nuland and the 2016 United States elections. According to the video, Deripaska served as a liaison between the Russian government and Paul Manafort during Russian interference efforts in United States elections. Navalny correlates Vashukevich's book Who Wants to Seduce a Billionaire to persons, settings, and events in the Vashukevich film. In the video known as Fishgate, Fish Gate or Rybka Gate (Russian: «Рыбка-гейт»), Navalny explains the characters and setting for Nastya Rybka's book Who Wants to Seduce a Billionaire: Ruslan Zolotov is Deripaska, Papa is Prikhodko, Vitya or Victor is Yevgeny Agarkov (Russian: Евгений Агарков) (Note: Since 2016, Yevgeny Agarkov (Russian: «Рыбка-гейт») through his ownership of the Cyprus based Lampgod Limited owns Moscow Region Consult LLC which owns the 2008 established Lake Baikal Wildlife Conservation Fund.) and the Rybka book's setting of Greenland is actually Norway. Rybka refers to Papa as Richelieu, or a Cardinal in the Kremlin who is the person actually responsible for Russia's foreign policy during the governments of Boris Yeltsin, Vladimir Putin, and Dmitri Medvedev. Through Adam Waldman, Deripaska has denied bribery allegations presented in the video.

Deripaska filed a lawsuit in Deripaska's hometown court at Ust-Labinsk, Krasnodar Krai, Russia, against Rybka and Leslie for publishing material about him. On 10 February 2018, Roskomnadzor placed Navalny's website and his investigation video on the prohibited log. On 24 February 2018, Navalny removed his investigation video from his website.

=== Arrest in Thailand ===
On 25 February 2018, Vashukevich was arrested at a hotel in Pattaya, Thailand, and held at Nong Pla Lai Prison. According to Vladimir Sosnov, the head of the consular department of the Russian embassy in Thailand, Rybka was one of ten Russians that were detained and awaiting trial and deportation from Thailand. While in custody, she reached out to the American government seeking asylum in exchange for photographs and 16 hours of audio recordings she made in August 2016, that could shed light on possible Russian interference in American elections. She was visited by FSB, CIA, and many times by Vladimir Pronin, the Russia consul for the Pattaya consular district, but the FBI was not allowed to visit because Thai officials only allowed visitors that were legal representatives for her and her family members. According to Jillian Bonnardeaux spokesperson for the United States embassy in Bangkok, all matters involving asylum are directed to Kirstjen Nielsen and the Department of Homeland Security. (Note: On 28 February 2018, the Radio Free Europe website displayed photos of her asylum request that had been delivered to the United States embassy in Thailand by Ukrainian-American, Pavlo Yunko. The note signed by the ten persons detained by Thai authorities including Vashukevich stated that they had "run out of Russia to Thailand" because they had been "repressed by Russia" for the materials they had including "photo-video-audio of crymes of Russian government" ... "about US Relations with russia".) Vladimir Pronin gained her release for time served if she left Thailand which she did and, according to court order, returned to Belarus. According to Anti-Corruption Foundation, Deripaska has arranged her imprisonment in Thailand through his agents. (Note: Oleg Deripaska's agents were Tatyana Valerianovna Monegen (Russian: Татьяна Валериановна Монэгэн) and George Oganov (Russian: Георгий Оганов) who explained to an English-speaking attorney William that Deripaska was not happy with deportation but wanted prison for Vashukevich.) (Note: Tatyana Valerianovna Monegen has been secretary general of the Russian branch of the International Chamber of Commerce (ICC) which Oleg Deripaska founded. Both his Rusal and the Russian branch of ICC have the same phone number. According to Nalvany, Tatyana Monegen assists Deripaska in finding escorts. George Oganov is a former Russian diplomat who was press secretary for the Russian embassy in the United States and, as of 2019, is on the board of directors of Basic Element and is an advisor to its president Oleg Deripaska.) Vashukevich believed that Nikolai Patrushev who had traveled to Thailand was involved. However, on 28 February 2018, Putin's spokesperson Dmitry Peskov denied that Russian Security Council Secretary Nikolai Patrushev's visit to Thailand is connected to Vashukevich because Patrushev's trips are arranged in advance and he travels often overseas adding "It's ludicrous to link this to the detention of Russian nationals in Thailand." (Note: The Mueller Report was submitted to Barr on March 22, 2018, but no one interviewed Vashukevich during the Muller Investigation.)

=== Relinquishment of recordings and lawsuit by Deripaska ===
In August 2018, Vashukevich said she had sent the audio recordings to Deripaska without making them public, hoping he would be able to gain her release from prison. She said she promised Deripaska she would not make any further comment on the recordings' contents. In court, Vashukevich apologized to Deripaska and Prikhodko.

In 2018, Deripaska won a legal case in Deripaska's hometown court at Ust-Labinsk, Krasnodar Krai, Russia, against Vashukevich for the invasion of his privacy by the public availability of videos and photos of the two of them together. Deripaska sued for 1 million rubles from each Vashukevich and Kirillov but the court set the payment at 500,000 rubles for each Vashukevich and Kirillov.

=== Later arrest and release ===
Vashukevich was arrested at Sheremetyevo Airport in Moscow in January 2019 while in transit from Thailand to Belarus for reportedly drawing people into prostitution. After videos showing her being violently arrested and pleading for her life in court were leaked to the press, Belarusian President Alexander Lukashenko demanded her release. She was immediately released. Vashukevich said she was warned not to discuss Deripaska while in Russian custody. She said her claims about him were intended to save her from death while detained in Thailand.

== Later life ==
Her second marriage was to Nikolai Vashukevich (Russian: Николай Вашукевич; Belarusian: Мікалай Вашукевіч), but she left him and her 11-year-old son Yuri from her first marriage for Moscow, where she earned her living and [according to her] was helping Nicolai to support her son. Upon her return from Thailand to Moscow in January 2019, Nikolai Vashukevich filmed the arrest of Anastasia Vashukevich by Moscow police at the Sheremetyevo International Airport.

== Works ==
- Rybka, Nastya. Who Wants to Seduce a Billionaire (Дневник соблазнения миллиардера, или клон для олигарха lit. The Billionaire Seduction Diary, or Clone for the Oligarch). Moscow. Eksmo, 2017. ISBN 978-5-699-93242-9 Archived book: Дневник по соблазнению Миллиардера, или Клон для олигарха (in Russian)
- Leslie, Alex; Rybka, Nastya. Eurotrash, How to Seduce the Rich for the Poor (Russian: Eurotrash. Соблазнение богатых на бедных). Moscow. Eksmo, 2017. First published: September 5, 2017.
- Учебник порядочной рыбы. Настольная книга для взрослых девочек. — Эксмо, 2021. Автор: Настя Рыбка — ISBN 978-5-04-122632-9
