= Yevgeny Afanasyev =

Russian diplomat (born 1947)

- Евгений Афанасьев
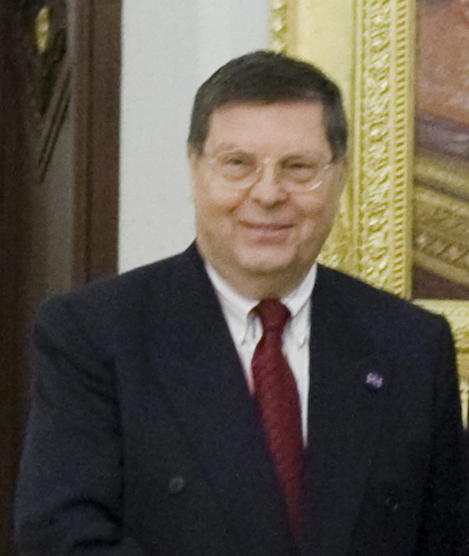
- Afanasyev in 2010

Ambassador of Russia to Japan
- In office 20 February 2012 – 29 January 2018
- President: Dmitry Medvedev; Vladimir Putin
- Preceded by: Mikhail Bely
- Succeeded by: Mikhail Galuzin

Director of the Personnel Department of the Ministry of Foreign Affairs
- In office February 2010 – February 2012
- Preceded by: Vladimir Morozov
- Succeeded by: Sergey Garmonin

Ambassador of Russia to Thailand
- In office 9 November 2004 – 3 February 2010
- President: Vladimir Putin; Dmitry Medvedev
- Preceded by: Yevgeny Ostrovenko
- Succeeded by: Aleksandr Maryasov

Director of the First Asian Department, Ministry of Foreign Affairs
- In office 2001–2004
- Preceded by: Leonid Moiseyev
- Succeeded by: Konstantin Vnukov

Ambassador of Russia to South Korea
- In office 3 June 1997 – 25 December 2000
- President: Boris Yeltsin; Vladimir Putin
- Preceded by: Georgy Kunadze
- Succeeded by: Teymuraz Ramishvili

Director of the First Asian Department, Ministry of Foreign Affairs
- In office 1994–1997
- Preceded by: Mikhail Bely
- Succeeded by: Leonid Moiseyev

Personal details
- Born: 25 May 1947 (age 78) Rostov-on-Don, Russian SFSR, Soviet Union
- Children: 4
- Education: Moscow State Institute of International Relations (MGIMO)
- Profession: Diplomat
- Awards: Order of Friendship; Medal "For Impeccable Service", 30 years Order of Holy Prince Daniel of Moscow, 3rd class Honored Employee of the Diplomatic Service of the Russian Federation

Yevgeny Vladimirovich Afanasyev (Russian: Евгений Владимирович Афанасьев; born 25 May 1947) is a Russian diplomat. He has served as the Russian ambassador to South Korea between 1997 and 2000, to Thailand between 2004 and 2010, and to Japan between 2012 and 2018. He was awarded the distinction of Honored Employee of the Diplomatic Service of the Russian Federation in 2016.

== Biography ==
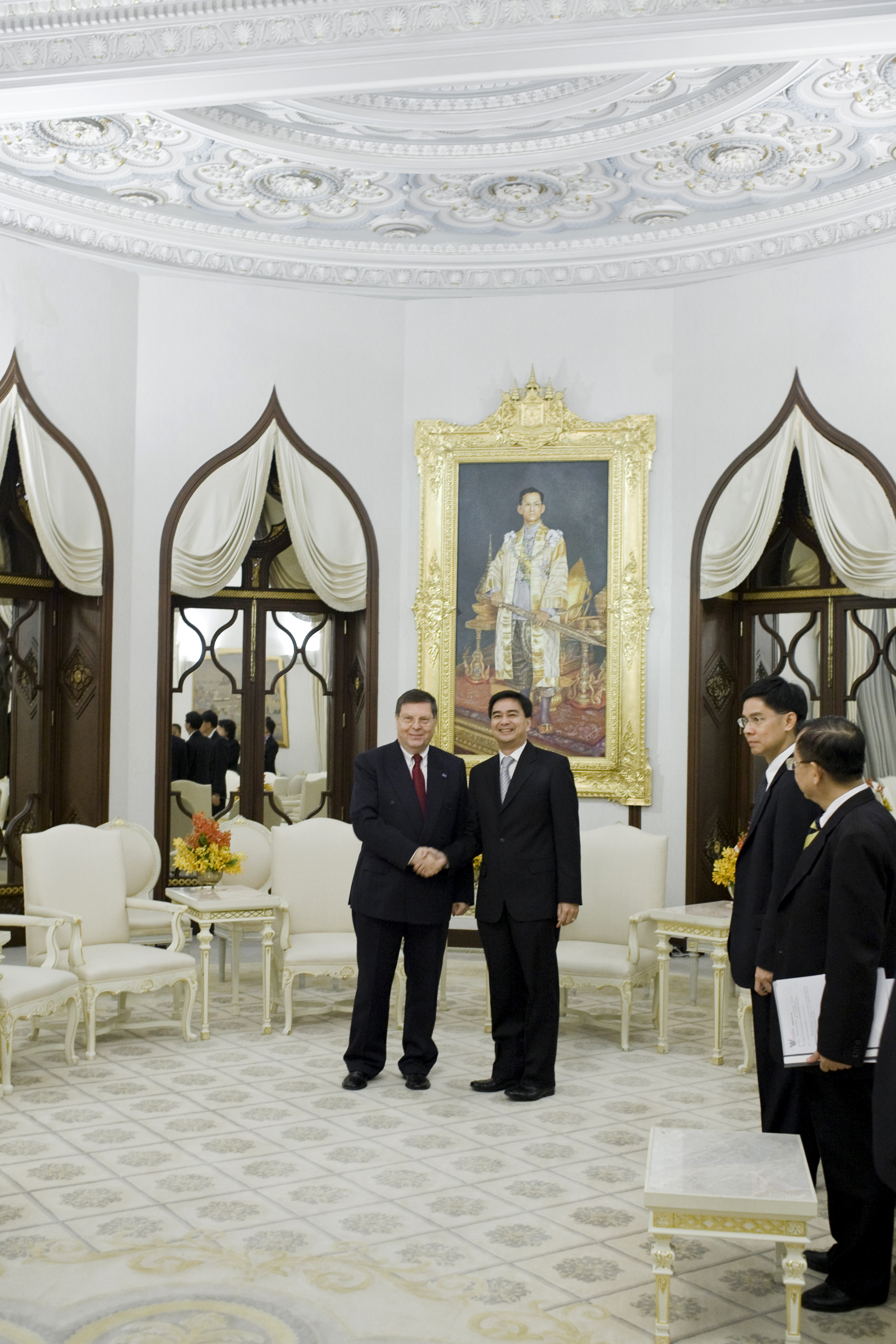
Yevgeny Afanasyev (left) and Prime Minister of Thailand Abhisit Vejjajiva, 5 February 2010

Afanasyev was born on 25 May 1947, in Rostov-on-Don. In 1970, he graduated from Moscow State Institute of International Relations (MGIMO) and began working that year for the Soviet Ministry of Foreign Affairs. He is fluent in Chinese, English, and French. From 1970 to 1975, he was an attaché at the Soviet Embassy in China, and then from 1975 to 1976, he was an attaché of the First Far Eastern Department of the Ministry of Foreign Affairs.

Between 1976 and 1984, Afanasyev rose through the positions of third secretary, second secretary, and then first secretary at the Soviet embassy in the United States. From 1985 to 1987, he was the chief assistant to the Deputy Minister of Foreign Affairs of the USSR, overseeing relations with countries in the Asia-Pacific region. In 1987, he was an advisor to the Secretariat of the Minister of Foreign Affairs. From 1987 to 1992, he was an advisor to the Soviet embassy, then (from 1991) the Russian embassy in the United States. From 1992 to 1994, he was the First Deputy Head of the First Department of the Asia-Pacific Region of the Russian Ministry of Foreign Affairs, and from 1994 to 1997, Afanasyev was the Director of the First Department of Asia of the Ministry of Foreign Affairs.

From 3 June 1997, to 25 December 2001, Afanasyev served as the Russian ambassador to South Korea. From 2001 to 2004, he was the Director of the First Department of Asia of the Russian Ministry of Foreign Affairs. From 9 November 2004, to 3 February 2010, he served as the Russian ambassador to Thailand and concurrently as the Permanent Representative to the United Nations Economic and Social Commission for Asia and the Pacific (ESCAP) in Bangkok.

From 2010 to 2012, Afanasyev was the Director of the Personnel Department of the Ministry of Foreign Affairs. From 20 February 2012, to 29 January 2018, he was the ambassador to Japan.

== Diplomatic Rank ==
- Envoy Extraordinary and Minister Plenipotentiary, 2nd class (2 June1993)
- Envoy Extraordinary and Minister Plenipotentiary, 1st class (19 January 1995)
- Ambassador Extraordinary and Plenipotentiary (3 June 1997)

== Awards ==
- Order of Friendship (4 March 1998) — "For his great contribution to the implementation of Russia's foreign policy and long-term conscientious work".
- Honored Employee of the Diplomatic Service of the Russian Federation (26 October2016) — "for his great contribution to the implementation of the foreign policy of the Russian Federation and long-term conscientious work".
- Insignia "For Impeccable Service" XXX years (13 November 2005) — "For merits in the implementation of the foreign policy of the Russian Federation and long-term fruitful work".
- Gratitude of the President of the Russian Federation (10 August 2007) — "For his great contribution to the implementation of Russia's foreign policy and ensuring Russian interests in Southeast Asia".
- Order of Holy Prince Daniel of Moscow, 3rd Class (19 December 2009)

== Family ==
Afanasyev is married, with a son and three daughters.
