= List of ambassadors of Thailand to Russia =

Coordinates: 55.773461°N 37.639298°E

Ambassador of Thailand to Russia
- Incumbent; Sasiwat Wongsinsawat since September 20, 2019
- Inaugural holder: Chulalongkorn
- Formation: July 1, 1897

The Thai Ambassador in Moscow is the official representative of the Government in Bangkok to the Government of Russia. Actual Ambassador is Sasiwat Wongsinsawat.

== List of representatives ==
Diplomatic agreement/designated/Diplomatic accreditation	Buddhist calendar	Ambassador	Thai language	Observations	List of prime ministers of Thailand	List of heads of government of Russia	Term end	Buddhist calendar
July 1, 1897	2440	Chulalongkorn		Visited the Winter Palace	Chulalongkorn	Nicholas II of Russia		
March 1, 1917	2460			diplomatic relations suspended	Vajiravudh	Alexander Kerensky		
March 12, 1941	2484			The governments in Moscow and Bangkok established diplomatic relations. Date of the Note form Molotov to the Thai Ambassador to Germany, Envoy of the Kingdom of Thailand in Berlin, Pra Prasana Bidiayud. On the establishment of diplomatic relations between the USSR and Thailand	Phibul Songkhram	Mikhail Kalinin		
December 28, 1946	2489			Note from the Thai Ambassador to Sweden, A. Banomyong	Kuang Abhayawongse	Nikolay Shvernik		
January 1, 1953	2496			14 juillet 1959 — S.E. M. CHEED SRESHTHAPUTRA, ancien Ambassadeur de Thaïlande en Union des Républiques Socialistes Soviétiques, est nommé Ambassadeur Extraordinaire et Plénipotentiaire de la Thaïlande au Cambodge, …	Phibul Songkhram	Kliment Voroshilov		
January 1, 1956	2499			agreement on the reciprocal reorganization of missions in to embassies.	Phibul Songkhram	Kliment Voroshilov		
September 5, 1956	2499	Nai Cheed Sreshthaputra	th:จิ๊ด เศรษฐบุตร	Shid Srestaputra (January 18, 1906 - January 19, 1995)	Phibul Songkhram	Kliment Voroshilov		
February 7, 1959	2502	Manu Amatayakul		lawyer, educator, former Thai ambassador (* b. Bangkok, Thailand. Apr. 19. 1911) he was the son of Phya Amaiayabhong and Khunying Thanom (Svasdi-Xuto).: From 1954 to 1959 he was ambassador in Moscow.; From 1959 to 1963 he was Thai Ambassador to Spain.; From 1963 to 1965 he was director general of the department treaty and legal dept Ministry Fgn. Affairs.; From 1965 to 1970 he was legal adviser to the prime minister.	Sarit Dhanarajata	Kliment Voroshilov	January 1, 1963	2512
June 10, 1963	2506	Pramote Chongcharoen		(*April 24, 1908 en Klongsarn c, Thonburi App, 25 February 1969 Occ: Under Secretary, Ministry of Foreign Affairs. Education: Barrister at Law, Knight Grand Cordon of the Most Noble Order of the Crown of Thailand Res.	Thanom Kittikachorn	Leonid Brezhnev		
December 11, 1974	2517	Arun Phanuphong		Thai Ambassador to USSR Arun Phanuphong, the newly appointed Thai Ambassador to the USSR, was received by Premier	Sanya Dharmasakti	Nikolai Podgorny		
May 30, 1977	2520	Sathit Sathirathaya			Kriangsak Chomanan	Leonid Brezhnev	January 1, 1980	2529
January 1, 1981	2524	Kamol Kaosayananda		Chargé d'affaires	Prem Tinsulanonda	Leonid Brezhnev		
January 1, 1984	2527	Vaikundha Samruatruamphol			Prem Tinsulanonda	Yuri Andropov	January 1, 1985	2534
January 1, 1987	2530	Prajit Rojanaphruk			Prem Tinsulanonda	Andrei Gromyko		
December 28, 1991	2534			The governments in Bangkok and Moscow established diplomatic relations.	Anand Panyarachun	Boris Yeltsin		
January 1, 1991	2534	Kasit Piromya	th:กษิต ภิรมย์		Anand Panyarachun	Boris Yeltsin	January 1, 1993	2536
January 1, 1997	2540	Suchitra Hiranprueck	(* 1947 in Bangkok Third Secretary, Ministry of Foreign Affairs, 1972. Director, International Economics Division, 1984. Minister-Counsellor, Royal Thai Embassay, Tokyo, 1986. Deputy Director-General		Chavalit Yongchaiyudh	Viktor Chernomyrdin	January 1, 1999	2542
January 1, 1999	2542	Vichien Chensavasdijai	From 1994 to 1996 he was Thai Ambassador to the United Arab Emirates.		Chuan Leekpai	Yevgeny Primakov	January 1, 2000	2543
January 1, 2001	2546	Rangsan Phaholyothin			Thaksin Shinawatra	Mikhail Kasyanov	January 1, 2005	2548
January 1, 2005	2548	Sorayouth Prompoj			Thaksin Shinawatra	Mikhail Kasyanov	January 1, 2006	2555
April 13, 2007	2550	Suphot Dhirakaosal	นายสุพจน์ ธีรเกาศัลย์	Супот Діракаосал	Surayud Chulanont	Viktor Zubkov		
April 20, 2016	2559	Kriangsak Kittichaisaree	เกรียงศักดิ์กิตติชัยเสรี		Prayut Chan-o-cha	Dmitry Medvedev		
September 20, 2019	2562	Sasiwat Wongsinsawat	ศศิวัฒน์ วงศ์สินสวัสดิ์		Prayut Chan-o-cha	Vladimir Putin		

- Russia–Thailand relations
- List of ambassadors of Russia to Thailand
