= List of ambassadors of Russia to South Korea =

Ambassador of the Russian Federation to the Republic of Korea
- Emblem of the Russian Foreign Ministry
- Incumbent; Georgy Zinoviev since 7 December 2023
- Ministry of Foreign Affairs; Embassy of Russia in Seoul
- Style: His Excellency
- Reports to: Minister of Foreign Affairs
- Seat: Seoul
- Appointer: President of Russia
- Term length: At the pleasure of the president
- Website: Russian Embassy in South Korea

The ambassador extraordinary and plenipotentiary of the Russian Federation to the Republic of Korea is the official representative of the president and the government of the Russian Federation to the president and the government of South Korea.

The ambassador and his staff work at large in the Embassy of Russia in Seoul. There is a consulate general in Busan. The post of Russian ambassador to South Korea is currently held by Georgy Zinoviev, incumbent 7 December 2023.

== History of diplomatic relations ==
The Russian Empire established relations with the Joseon Dynasty in 1884. However Korea was deprived of its right to conduct independent foreign policy by the Japan-Korea Treaty of 1905, while the Union of Soviet Socialist Republics (the eventual successor to the Russian Empire) did not formally recognise the Provisional Government of the Republic of Korea in exile. In 1948, three years after the end of Japanese rule in Korea, the USSR recognised only one government on the Korean Peninsula—the Democratic People's Republic of Korea, commonly North Korea. In September 1990, towards the end of its existence, the USSR established relations with the Republic of Korea (commonly known as South Korea).

== List of heads of mission ==
=== Ministers of the Russian Empire to the Joseon Dynasty ===
- Karl Ivanovich Weber, appointed 14 October 1885

=== Ministers of the Russian Empire to the Korean Empire ===
- Karl Ivanovich Weber (as above)
- Alexey Shpeyer, appointed 28 March 1898
- Paul Pavlov, appointed 13 December 1898.

=== Ambassadors of the Soviet Union to the Republic of Korea ===
Name	Appointment	Termination	Notes
Oleg Sokolov	30 October 1990	25 December 1991	

=== Ambassadors of the Russian Federation to the Republic of Korea ===
Name	Appointment	Termination	Notes
Oleg Sokolov	25 December 1991	17 February 1992	
Aleksandr Panov	17 February 1992	1 November 1993	
Georgy Kunadze	1 November 1993	13 June 1997	
Yevgeny Afanasyev	13 June 1997	25 December 2000	
Teymuraz Ramishvili	25 December 2000	4 April 2005	
Gleb Ivashentsov	4 April 2005	17 July 2009	
Konstantin Vnukov	17 July 2009	26 December 2014	
Aleksandr Timonin	26 December 2014	18 July 2018	
Andrey Kulik	18 July 2018	7 December 2023	
Georgy Zinoviev	7 December 2023		

== See also ==
- Russia-Korea Treaty of 1884
- List of diplomatic missions in South Korea
- List of ambassadors of Russia to North Korea
