= Alexander Olarovsky =

Russian diplomat (1845–1910)

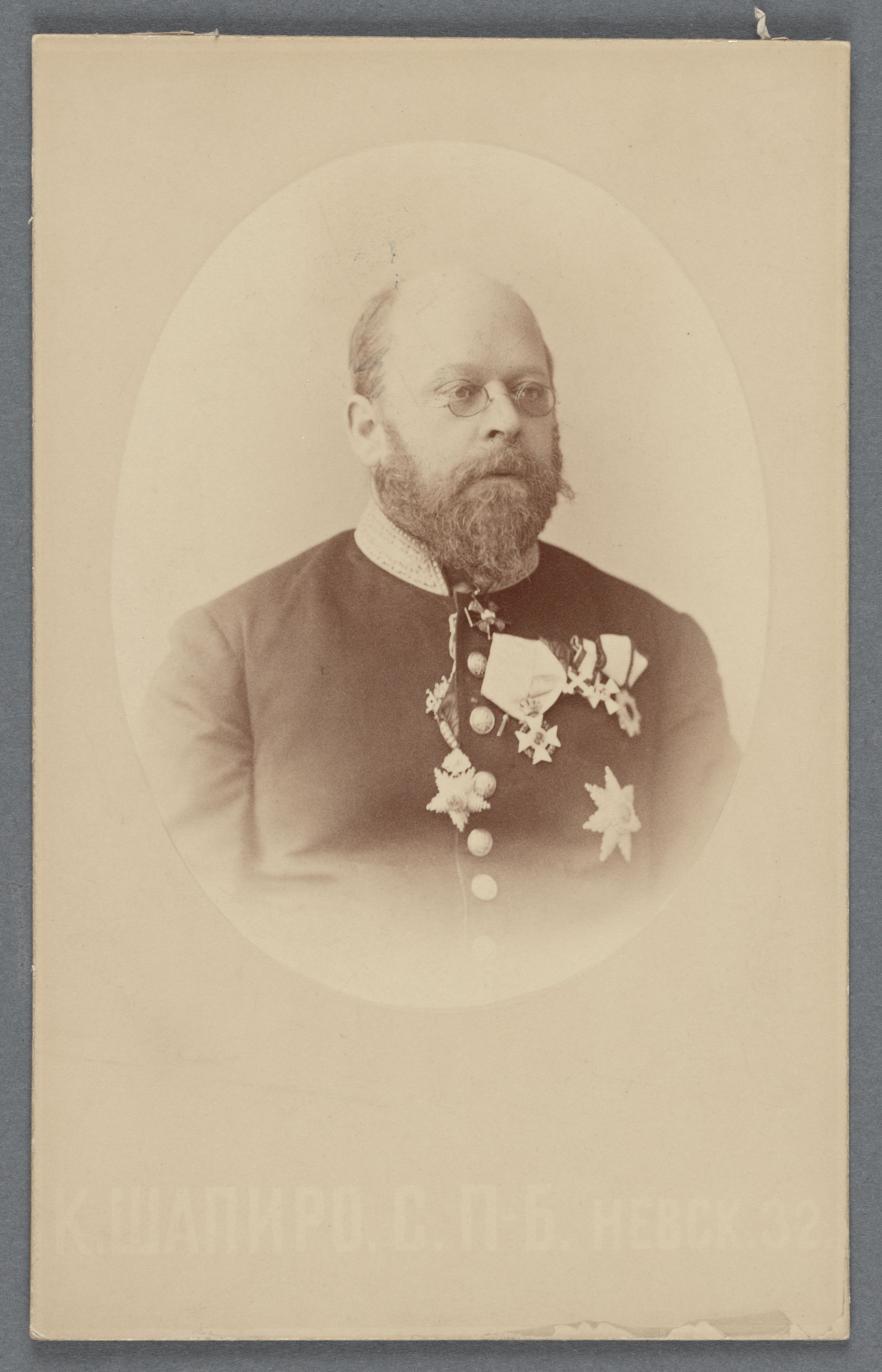
Olarovsky as consul-general in New York, 1894

Alexander Epiktetovich Olarovsky (also spelled Aleksandr and Olarovski / Olarovskii, Russian: Александр Эпиктетович Оларовский; 1845–1910) was a diplomat of Imperial Russia who served as the first Russian envoy to Siam (now Thailand), from 1898 to 1907. He was instrumental in the establishment of relations between the two countries under the reigns of Russia's Tsar Nicholas II and Siam's King Chulalongkorn (Rama V).

== Biography ==
Olarovsky previously served as consul-general to the United States in San Francisco and in New York, and was appointed as chargé d'affaires and consul-general to Siam in December 1897, following the establishment of diplomatic relations during Chulalongkorn's visit to Russia that year. He arrived in Bangkok in April 1898, and was raised to resident minister in October.

Olarovsky's posting was a significant attempt to further Russia's influence in the region by supporting Siam against French and British colonialist encroachment. He played a major role mediating over France's territorial demands following the Franco-Siamese crisis of 1893, though his influence with the Thai court waned after 1901 when Russia began to side more with France. British groups, wary of Russia attempting to undermine their hegemony in the region, also blocked his various attempts to expand Russian trade in Siam. A declaration of friendship between Russia and Siam was signed by Olarovsky and Prince Devawongse (the Siamese Foreign Minister) in 1899, which granted temporary extraterritoriality to the handful of Russian subjects in Siam, though it never developed into a full treaty. Olarovsky's position was raised to minister plenipotentiary in 1906, until he left his post in 1907.

Olarovsky was a skilled diplomat and a prominent member of the expatriate community in Siam. He was the founding chairman of the Royal Bangkok Sports Club, established in 1901, and also served as Danish consul, looking after Danish interests in Siam, which gave him a significant position in the East Asiatic Company.
