= Suphot Dhirakaosal =

Thai diplomat

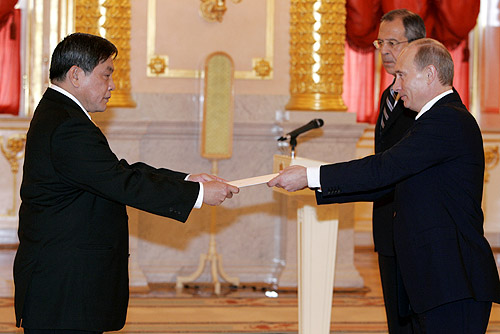
Suphot Dhirakaosal, 2007, presenting his letters of credentials as Thai Ambassador to Russia to Vladimir Putin.

Suphot Dhirakaosal (Thai: นายสุพจน์ ธีรเกาศัลย์) is the Ambassador Extraordinary and Plenipotentiary of the Kingdom of Thailand to the Russian Federation.

Suphot Dhirakaosal studied International Affairs and Law at Thammasat University, Bangkok. After graduating, he joined the Ministry of Foreign Affairs of Thailand in 1973, working locally and in foreign diplomatic missions in Hanoi, Geneva, Rome, and appointed in 1995 as Consul General in Los Angeles.

His first appointment as Ambassador Extraordinary and Plenipotentiary of Thailand was in 2000 to the State of Kuwait. He went on to serve as Ambassador Extraordinary and Plenipotentiary of Thailand to the United Arab Emirates (2002-2004), Myanmar in 2004, and as of 2013 is serving in that capacity in Russia.

Dhirakaosal married in 1977, with two children as of 2004.
