= Kasit Piromya =

Thai diplomat and politician (born 1944)

- กษิต ภิรมย์
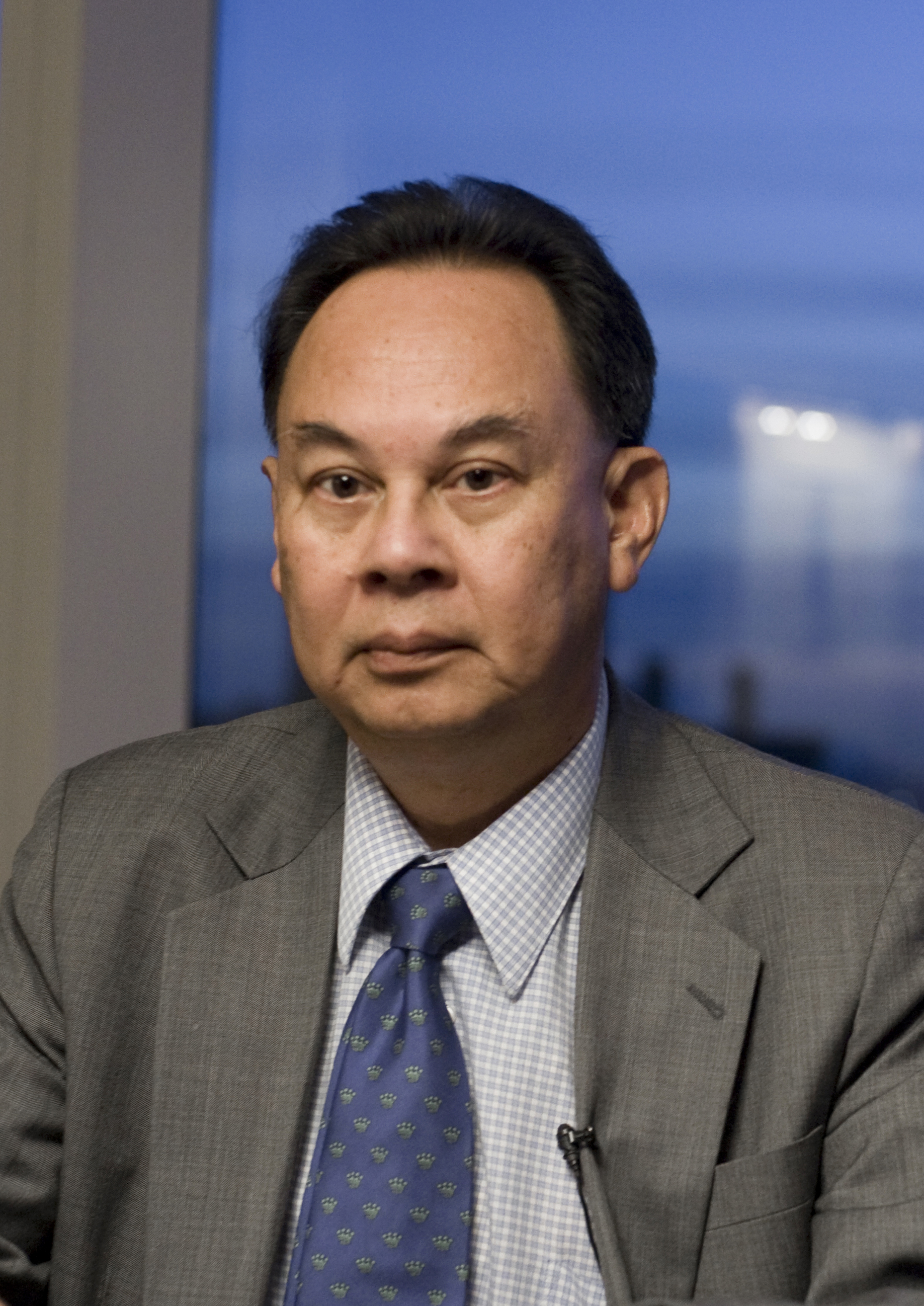
- Kasit Piromya in New York, 2009

Minister of Foreign Affairs
- In office 20 December 2008 – 9 August 2011
- Prime Minister: Abhisit Vejjajiva
- Preceded by: Sompong Amornwiwat
- Succeeded by: Surapong Tovichakchaikul

Personal details
- Born: 15 December 1944 (age 81) Thonburi, Thailand
- Party: Democrat Party (until 2019)
- Education: International Institute of Social Studies; Georgetown University
- Profession: Politician; diplomat

Kasit Piromya (Thai: กษิต ภิรมย์; RTGS: Kasit Phirom; born 15 December 1944 in Thonburi) served as a Thai diplomat, Democrat Party politician, and activist in the People's Alliance for Democracy ("Yellow Shirts"). He was Foreign Minister of Thailand under Abhisit Vejjajiva from 2008 to 2011.

== Early life and education ==
Kasit was born on 15 December 1944 in Thonburi. He received early education at Bangkok Christian College and studied at St. Joseph's College, Darjeeling, India. He studied at the Faculty of Political Science, Chulalongkorn University for a period of time before attending the School of Foreign Service, Georgetown University, USA, where he received a bachelor's degree in International Affairs. He then received a master's degree in international relations at the Institute of Social Studies, the Hague, the Netherlands. Later on, he studied at the National Defense College, Class 32.

== Careers ==
He has served as the ambassador to the Soviet Union and Mongolia, Russia and the former Soviet republics, Indonesia and Papua New Guinea, Germany, Japan, and the United States.

== Royal decorations ==
Kasit has received the following royal decorations in the Honours System of Thailand:

- Knight Grand Cordon (Special Class) of the Most Exalted Order of the White Elephant
- Knight Grand Cordon (Special Class) of The Most Noble Order of the Crown of Thailand
