= Russia–Thailand relations =

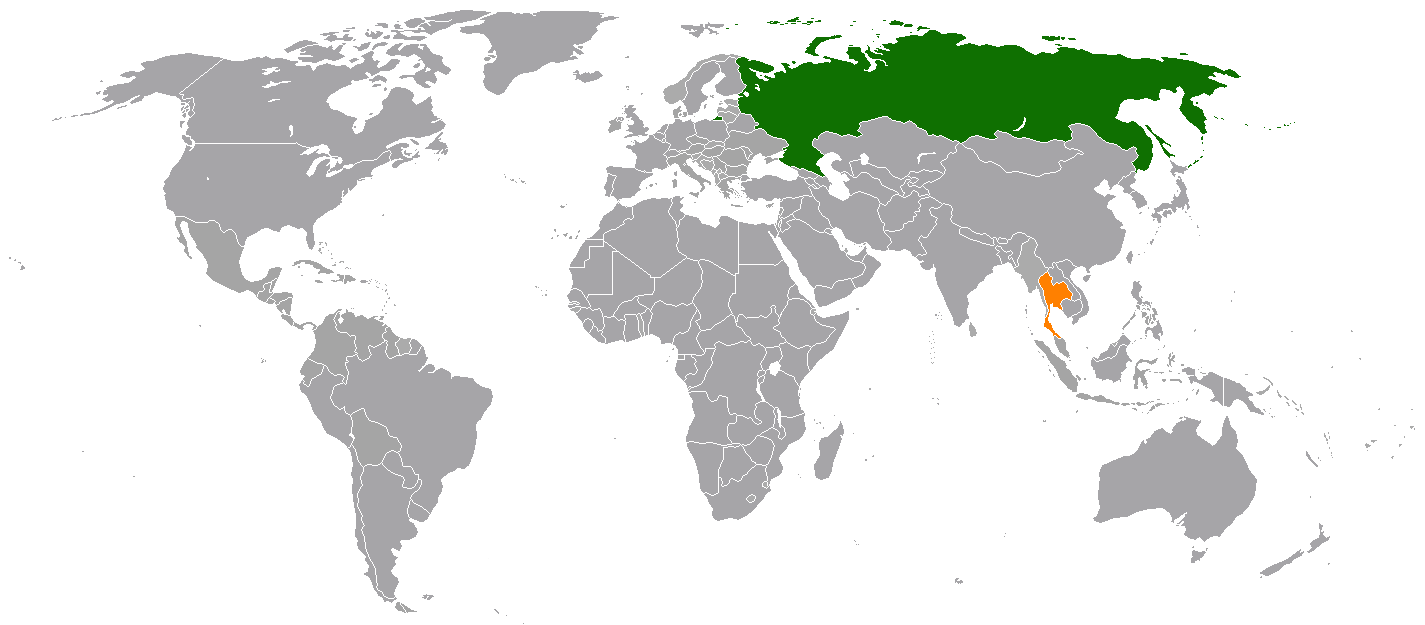
- Russia: Thailand

Diplomatic mission
- Embassy of Russia, Bangkok: Royal Thai Embassy, Moscow

Envoy
- Ambassador Yevgeny Tomikhin: Ambassador Sasiwat Wongsinsawat

Bilateral relations between Russia and Thailand date to the late nineteenth century, when the Russian Tsar Nicholas II and King Chulalongkorn (Rama V) of Siam (as Thailand was then known) formed a friendly personal relationship. The two countries exchanged legations in 1897–1898, and signed a declaration of friendship in 1899. Diplomatic relations were terminated following the Russian Revolution in 1917, and re-established between the Soviet Union and Thailand on 12 March 1941; Thailand recognized the Russian Federation as the successor to Soviet Union on 28 December 1991. Russia has an embassy in Bangkok and three honorary consulates in Phuket, Pattaya and Koh Samui. Thailand has an embassy in Moscow and two honorary consulates (in Saint Petersburg and Vladivostok). Both countries are full members of APEC and the Organization for Security and Co-operation in Europe (Russia is a participating state and Thailand is a partner).

== History ==
=== Siam and Imperial Russia ===
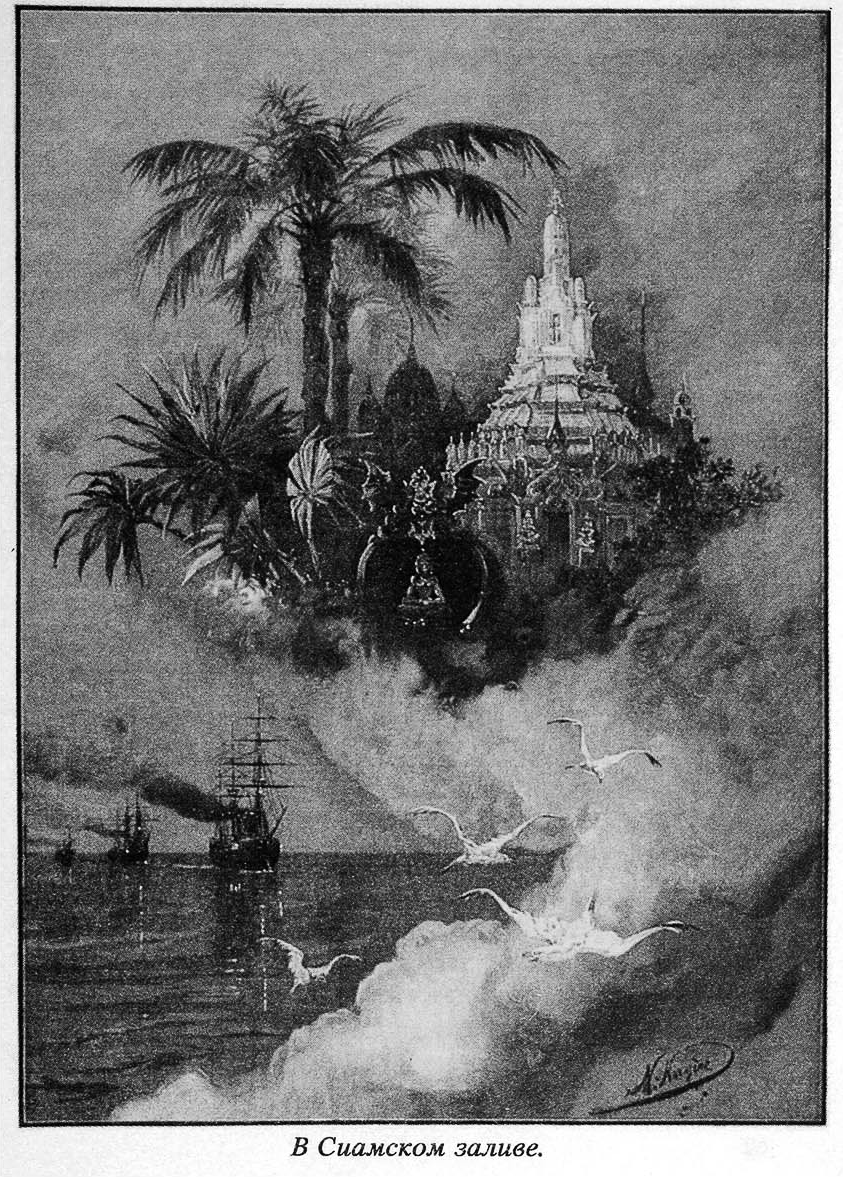
Tsesarevich's ship Pamiat Azova in the Gulf of Siam

The first recorded contact between Russians and Siam was on 19 February 1863, when the ships Gaydamak and Novik arrived at Bangkok.

Early relations between the countries were cordial, derived from friendly personal relations between King Chulalongkorn (Rama V, r. 1868–1910) of Siam and Emperor Nicholas II of Russia (r. 1894–1917), who had visited Siam in 1891 when he was tsarevich (heir-apparent).

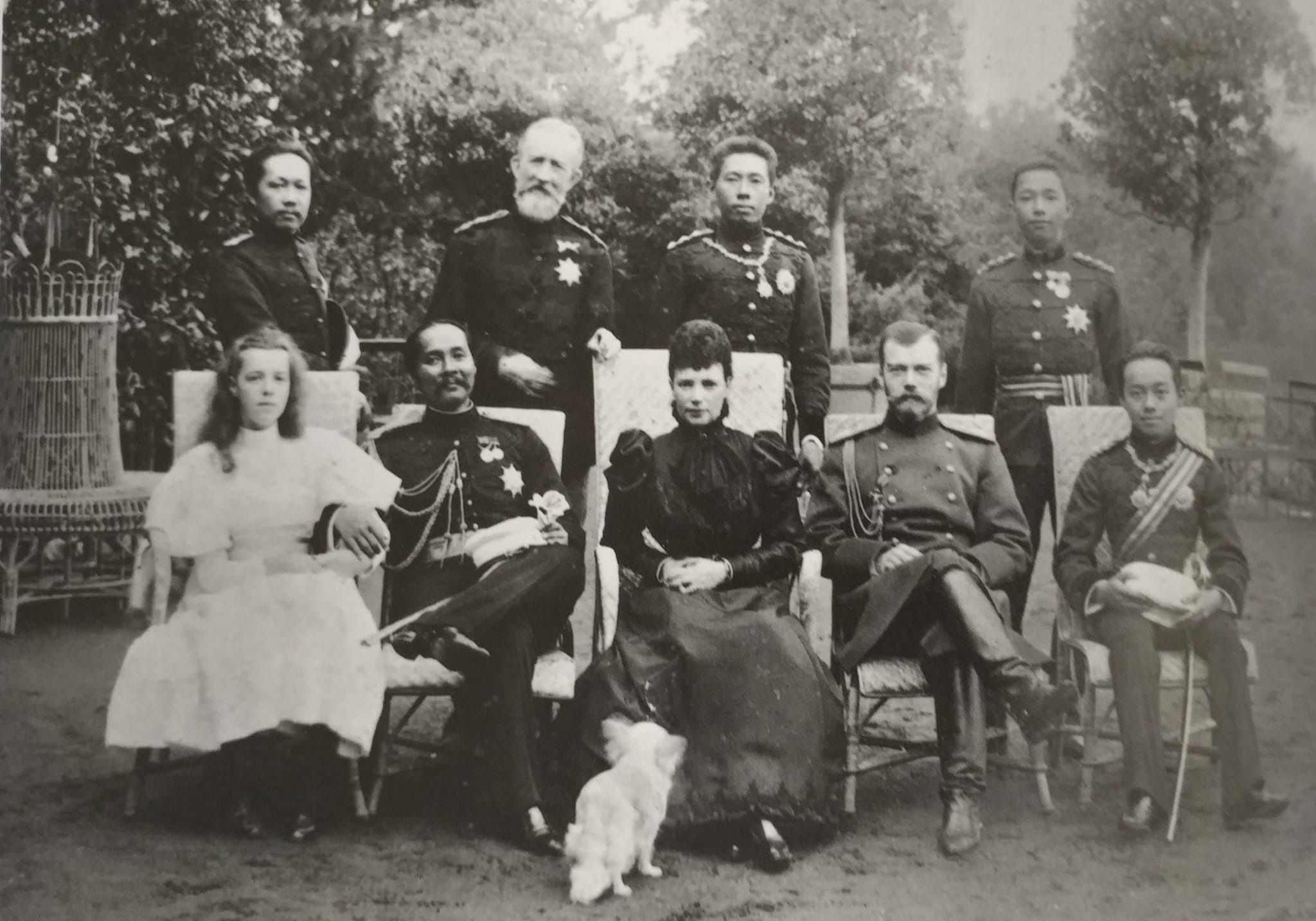
King Chulalongkorn with Tsar Nicholas II during the 1897 Grand Tour

Diplomatic relations were established following Chulalongkorn's visited to Russia as part of his 1897 tour of Europe. Chulalongkorn had hoped for Russian support to help counterbalance the French, who were exerting colonialist pressure on Siam, especially following the Franco-Siamese crisis of 1893. Alexander Olarovsky was posted as chargé d'affaires and consul-general in Bangkok, arriving in April 1898, and was elevated to resident minister that October. Siam was represented by Phraya Suriyanuwat, Chulalongkorn's envoy to France, Italy and Spain, who was resident in Paris.

Prince Chakrabongse Bhuvanath, one of Chulalongkorn's sons, was sent to study military school in Russia in 1898. He would later marry a Russian woman, Ekaterina Desnitskaya.

A declaration of friendship between Russia and Siam was signed in 1899. Russia had hoped to gain a monopoly in the kerosene trade, though negotiations for a full treaty never succeeded.

Diplomatic relations were terminated following the overthrow of the Russian tsarist government in the October Revolution.

=== Thailand and Soviet Russia ===
Thailand established diplomatic relations with the Soviet Union in 1941. The Bangkok embassy of the USSR, and later Russia, for a long time occupied a historic building on Sathon Road, also known as the Sathon Mansion.

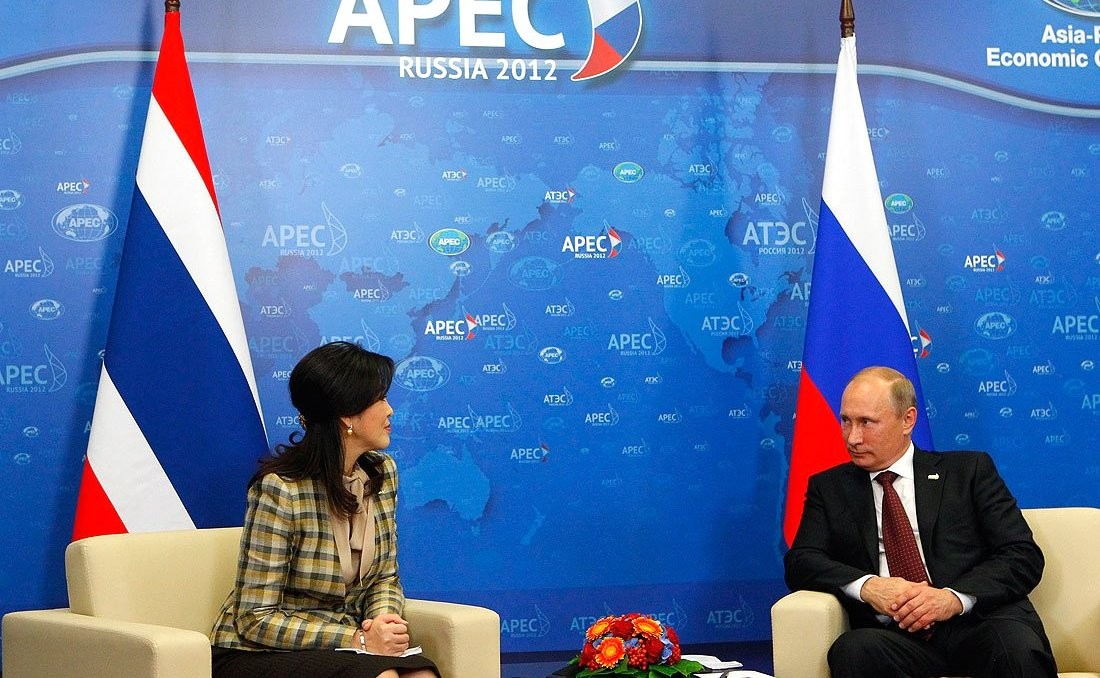
Thailand's Prime Minister Yingluck Shinawatra with Russian President Vladimir Putin at the APEC summit in Vladivostok, Russia, 8 September 2012

== Economic ties ==
=== Bilateral trade ===
Official figures of trade volume published by two countries contradict each other.

- According to Thai sources, trade with Russia in 2008 reached 2.11 billion US dollars; Thailand has a trade deficit of 1.76 billion US dollars. Russia exports mineral resources, while Thailand exports auto parts, electronics and foodstuffs.
- According to Russian customs service, Russian exports to Thailand in 2008 amounted to 1.23 billion, imports to 1.49 billion, leaving Russia with a deficit of 254 million US dollars. In total, trade with Thailand is only 0.4% of Russian foreign trade. According to Russian embassy in Bangkok, Thailand is Russia's largest trading partner in South-eastern Asia and third largest buyer of Russian ferrous metals worldwide.

As recently as in 2002, Russia had a significant trade deficit and imported significant (up to half a million metric tons p.a.) amounts of Thai rice. In 2005 Russia imposed prohibitive protectionist tariffs on rice, then an embargo on Thai rice and a full ban on imports of Thai rice in 2007, citing pest infection.

In 2004 Thailand approached Russian authorities about the prospects of buying 12 Su-30 jet fighters. Thai chicken industry, weakened by avian influenza crisis, enthusiastically backed the deal, betting on reciprocal easing of Russian food import regime, but the deal never materialized. In October 2008 Thai Prime Minister Somchai Wongsawat agreed to purchase Russian Mi-17 military helicopters, breaking with dependence on American weapons, however his government was ousted two months later.

On 21 May 2022, Thai Deputy Prime Minister and Commerce Minister Jurin Laksanawisit announced that Russia has pledged to support the goal of raising annual bilateral trade to US$10 billion from US$2.7 billion in 2021. Russia is looking to buy mainly food products, rice, fruits, automobiles and auto parts from Thailand. Russia also wants to increase investment of information technology in Thailand, as many Russian investors have set up base in Rayong's Amata industrial estate.

=== Tourism ===
Thailand is one of the major tropical destinations for tourists from Russia. However, numbers provided by the Thai authorities are contested by Russians as artificially inflated, and Thai authorities contest that Russian numbers are too small:

- Russian border guards reported 259,000 departures to Thailand in 2008 (235,000 in 2007). Turkey, the most common destination, accounts for 2.2 million departures. Thai government sources noted that the Russian number includes only direct flights, leaving out tourists that fly with stopovers elsewhere and reported 279,000 Russian tourists for 2007.
- Thai tourist service reported 456,972 Russian "tourist visits" to Pattaya alone in January–March 2007 (of a total of 1.57 million). Russian commentators note that Thais actually counted hotel nights and their number should be divided by a factor of 10 to 11.

In 2018, it is estimated that 1.5 million Russians visited Thailand, a 15% increase from 2017. On average, about 20,000 Thais visit Russia per year.

== 2022 Russian invasion of Ukraine ==
Thailand voted in favor of United Nations General Assembly Resolution ES-11/1 which condemned the 2022 Russian invasion of Ukraine, and also voted in favor of United Nations General Assembly Resolution ES-11/2, which sought to reaffirm the condemnation. Thailand abstained from voting on a resolution which sought to suspend Russia from the United Nations Human Rights Council, and abstained again from another resolution supporting the territorial integrity of Ukraine, following the 2022 annexation referendums in Russian-occupied Ukraine.

In January 2024, members of the self-exiled Russian rock band Bi-2, who fled Russia after Russia's invasion of Ukraine and publicly denounced the war and Putin's regime, were arrested in Thailand for allegedly violating immigration regulations and faced possible deportation to Russia because five of its members have Russian citizenship.

== See also ==
- Foreign relations of Russia
- Foreign relations of Thailand
