= Sergei Prikhodko (politician) =

Russian politician (1957–2021)

- Сергей Приходько
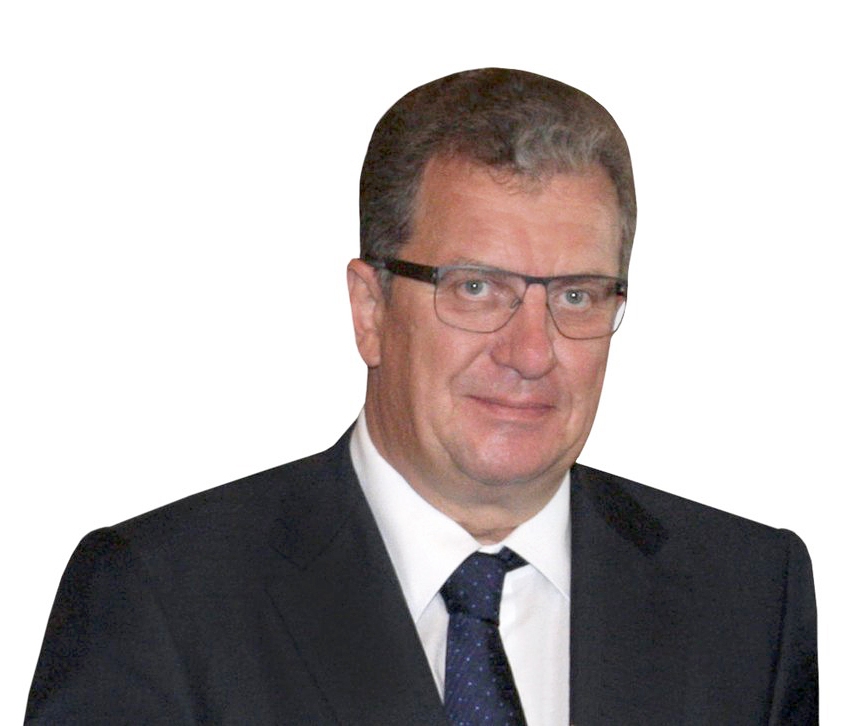
- Prikhodko in 2013

First Deputy Head of the Russian Government Office
- In office 19 May 2018 – 26 January 2021

Personal details
- Born: Sergei Eduardovich Prikhodko; 12 January 1957 Moscow, Russian SFSR, Soviet Union (now Russia)
- Died: 26 January 2021 (aged 64) Moscow, Russia
- Education: Moscow State Institute of International Relations
- Profession: Diplomat

Sergei Eduardovich Prikhodko (Russian: Сергей Эдуардович Приходько; 12 January 1957 – 26 January 2021) was a Russian politician and diplomat. From May 2013 to May 2018, he was Deputy Prime Minister in Dmitry Medvedev's Cabinet. He was engaged in international cooperation of the Cabinet. He served as the First Deputy Head of the Russian Government Office from 2018 to 2021. He had the federal state civilian service rank of 1st class Active State Councillor of the Russian Federation.

== Life and career ==
Prikhodko was born in Moscow. He graduated from the Moscow State Institute of International Relations in 1980. After graduation, he was a diplomat at the Soviet Embassy in Czechoslovakia. In the years 1986-1987 - Attaché, Third Secretary of the Office of European socialist countries Soviet Foreign Ministry.

In 1992-1993 - Second Secretary, First Secretary of the Embassy of Russia in Czechoslovakia. In the period 1993-1997 - Head of Department, Deputy Director of the Ministry of Foreign Affairs of the Russian Federation. On 9 April 1997 - Assistant to the President of the Russian Federation. On 14 September 1998 - Deputy Head of the Presidential Administration of the Russian Federation.

Since 2 February 1999 - Deputy Head of the Presidential Administration of the Russian Federation - Head of the Russian President's foreign policy. On 26 March 2004 - Assistant to the President of the Russian Federation. On 21 May 2012 - First Deputy Head of the Government of the Russian Federation. On 9 May 2013 - Acting Head of the Government of the Russian Federation. From 22 May 2013 to 7 May 2018 he was Deputy Prime Minister of Russia in Dmitry Medvedev's Cabinet.

He last served as the First Deputy Head of the Russian Government Office.

Prikhodko died on 26 January 2021 at the age of 64 from amyotrophic lateral sclerosis.

== Business interests ==
Since 2 August 2009 through the cooperative "Sosny" (Russian: ДНП «Сосны»), Prikhodko was a business partner of Sergey Neverov (Russian: Сергей Неверов), who was the Deputy Chairman of the State Duma and United Russia, Igor Rudensky (Russian: Игорь Руденский), who was a member of the Presidium of the General Council of United Russia, Vyacheslav Volodin, who was Chairman of the State Duma at the time, Konstantin Kosachev (Russian: Константин Косачев), who was the head of the Duma Committee on International Affairs at that time, Yu.V. Pervova (Russian: Ю.В. Первова) and Nikolay Ashlapov (Russian: Николай Аншлапов), who was later the Head of the Federal Agency for Special Construction. "Sosny" purchased land from the Nadezhda Ivanovna Makeeva associated Bolshoy Gorod LLC (Russian: ООО «Большой Город»). Makeeva's husband is the chairman of the board of NMC "Itera" Vladimir Pavlovich Makeev (Russian: НГК «Итера» Владимир Павлович Макеев) who is a close associate of the president of Itera Igor Makarov. Until 2011, this location was formerly associated with the St. Petersburg businessman Boris Vaninsky (Russian: Борис Ванинский) associated company Istra-Estate (Russian: «Истра-эстейт») and is near Velednikovo (Russian: Веледниково) in the Istrinsky District in the Moscow Oblast.

== Allegations of corruption ==
In February 2018, Alexei Navalny published a video alleging that Prikhodko had been receiving various bribes from Russian oligarch and dollar billionaire Oleg Deripaska, including prostitutes services as well as real estate valued at at least 1.5 billion rubles (some 25 million dollars). Prikhodko himself denied the allegations, accusing Navalny of "mixing the facts" about his "friend" Deripaska, Donald Trump and Paul Manafort, while also voicing his wish to have a talk with Navalny as a "man with a man". A day after the video was published the Roskomnadzor added the video to the Federal List of Extremist Materials, thus making accessing the video illegal for all Russian citizens. In the video known as Fishgate (Russian: «Рыбка-гейт»), Navalny explains the characters and setting for Nastya Rybka's book Who Wants to Seduce a Billionaire (ISBN 978-5-699-93242-9): Ruslan Zolotov is Deripaska, Papa is Prikhodko, Vitya or Victor or V is Yevgeny Agarkov and the Rybka's book setting of Greenland is actually Norway. Rybka refers to Papa as Richelieu, or a Cardinal in the Kremlin who is the person actually responsible for Russia's foreign policy during the governments of Boris Yeltsin, Vladimir Putin, and Dmitri Medvedev.
