= Oleg Deripaska =

Russian businessman (born 1968)

- Олег Дерипаска
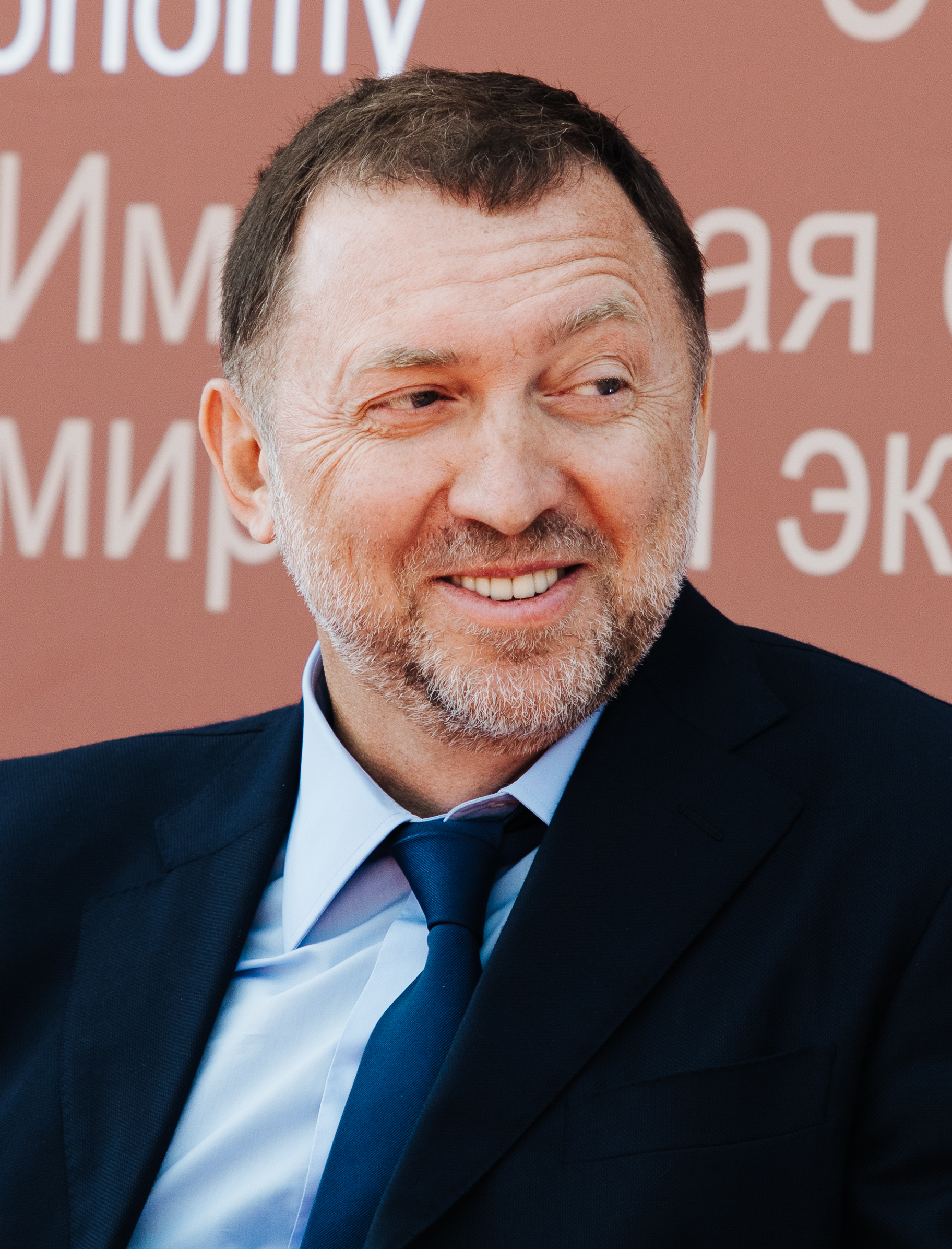
- Deripaska in 2020
- Born: 2 January 1968 (age 58); Dzerzhinsk, Gorky Oblast, Soviet Union
- Citizenship: Russia, Cyprus
- Education: Moscow State University; Plekhanov Russian University of Economics
- Occupation: Industrialist
- Known for: Founder of RUSAL; Founder of En+ Founder of Basic Element; Founder of Volnoe Delo
- Spouse: Polina Yumasheva (m. 2001; div. 2018)
- Children: 2
- Awards: Order of Alexander Nevsky; Order of Friendship
- Website: deripaska.com

Oleg Vladimirovich Deripaska (Russian: Олег Владимирович Дерипаска; born 2 January 1968) is a Russian oligarch and billionaire. Deripaska began his career as a metals trader after the breakup of the Soviet Union. He used accumulated funds from trading to acquire stakes in the Sayanogorsk aluminium smelter from a consortium of businessmen who privatized it in the aftermath of the collapse of the Soviet Union. The Sayanogorsk aluminium smelter served as the foundation of what later became the world's largest aluminium company Rusal.

Deripaska is the founder of Basic Element, one of Russia's largest industrial groups, and Volnoe Delo, Russia's largest charitable foundation. He was the president of En+ Group, a Russian energy company, and headed United Company Rusal, the second-largest aluminium company in the world, until he quit both roles in 2018.

He has been characterized as a victor in the "aluminium wars" in Russia during the 1990s, which were frequently violent conflicts between businesspeople to obtain state-owned assets. In 2000, Deripaska founded Rusal, the result of a partnership between Sibirsky Aluminium and Roman Abramovich's Millhouse Capital. In 2007, Rusal merged with SUAL Group and Glencore International AG to form UC Rusal, with Deripaska as chairman.

He was once Russia's richest man, but lost a substantial part of his fortune during the 2008 financial crisis. As of July 2025, his wealth was estimated by Forbes at $4.1 billion, making him the 887th richest person in the world. In 2017, Deripaska obtained a Cypriot citizenship through the country's 'golden visa' program, which allows major investors in the economy to apply for a national passport.

He was placed under U.S. sanctions in 2022 for reasons relating to the 2014 annexation of Crimea by Russia. Deripaska was one of seven oligarchs sanctioned by the British government over the 2022 Russian invasion of Ukraine, including asset freezes and travel bans.

As early as 2022, Deripaska was one of a handful Russian businessmen to openly denounce the Russian invasion of Ukraine. After making his statements, he faced pressure from the Kremlin, leading to the seizure of a major asset he owned, valued at USD 1 billion. Nonetheless, he returned to the subject in early August 2024, when he characterized the invasion as "madness" and called for it to be stopped immediately. He came under strong fire from the pro-Putin camp in Russia for his statements, notably from the ultranationalist Alexander Dugin.

== Early life and education ==
Deripaska was born to a Jewish family in Dzerzhinsk, Nizhny Novgorod Oblast, Soviet Russia and grew up in Ust-Labinsk, Krasnodar Krai. His parents came from Kuban. Deripaska grew up on the family's small farm, where from the age of 5 or 6, he learned how to live off the land from his grandparents, who primarily raised him after his widowed mother, an engineer, had to leave to find work. Deripaska credits his grandparents for teaching him the discipline of hard work along with farming. Both his grandfathers fought in the Second World War. His maternal grandfather returned to Russia after the war ended. His paternal grandfather Timofey Deripaska (1918-1945) – an ethnic Ukrainian – was killed in battle and buried in a mass grave in Austria — in his memory, Deripaska built a Russian Orthodox church in the town Laa an der Thaya.

Deripaska's first job was at the Ust-Labinsk plant where his mother worked. At age 11, he became an electrician's apprentice doing maintenance on electrical motors. His talent for math allowed him to enroll at the physics faculty of Moscow State University in 1985. One year into his studies, he was conscripted into the armed forces and served in the Soviet Strategic Missile Forces in the Trans-Baikal district of Siberia from 1986 to 1989.

In 1993, Deripaska graduated with honors in physics from Moscow State University; however, the collapse of the Soviet Union greatly reduced academic funding, making it impossible for him to continue his studies as a theoretical physicist. There were no available stipends or grants for students. "We had no money. It was an urgent and practical question every day. How do I earn money to buy food and keep studying?" he recalls. In 1996, he earned a master's degree from the Plekhanov University of Economics.

== Career ==
At the age of 25, teaming up with fellow physicists, engineers and rocket scientists, Deripaska set up his first metal trading company, VTK. He adopted a systematic, scientific approach to commodity trading. "I represented companies that were buying and selling raw materials", Deripaska said. Deripaska undertook export arbitrage, buying metal at low Russian prices and selling it abroad at significantly higher international market prices. Deripaska traded primarily through the Baltic state of Estonia, as the Russian system of export licenses was in disarray. "I started my business at an unusual moment in history. The country in which I was born and raised had disappeared, although the new country was not fully formed. The first one gave me an excellent education; the second one gave me the chance of success", Deripaska recalled in an interview with Metal Bulletin.

He used nearly all his arbitrage and trading profits to acquire his initial package of shares in the Sayanogorsk aluminium smelter in Southern Siberia.

In 1994, Deripaska became director general of the plant at the age of 26. In 1997, he founded Sibirsky (Siberian) Aluminium Group, which in 2000 merged with Roman Abramovich's Millhouse Capital to create RUSAL. In 2003, businesses led by Deripaska increased their stake in those companies under common management to 75% by acquiring half of the interest managed by Millhouse Capital. In 2004, the consolidation of RUSAL's ownership by companies related to Deripaska was completed with the acquisition of the remaining 25% equity interest in RUSAL managed by Millhouse Capital. Deripaska was named businessman of the year in 1999, 2006, and 2007 by Vedomosti, a Russian business daily.

RUSAL went on to become the largest aluminium producer in the world, until the China Hongqiao Group surpassed it in 2015. In 2010, under Deripaska's leadership, Rusal became the first Russian company to be listed on the Hong Kong Stock Exchange.

=== Basic Element ===
Beyond metals, which as of 2016 remained at the core of his diversified industrial holding, Deripaska has acquired stakes in a wide range of companies in various sectors, including energy, manufacturing, commercial vehicles, auto components, financial and insurance services, leasing businesses, construction, aviation, and agriculture. Among his assets are a Siberian power company EuroSibEnergo, that is Russia's biggest private energy company; he owns 10% of Ingosstrakh, one of Russia's largest insurance companies; GAZ Group, a producer of cars, trucks and buses, founder of agricultural business (Kuban Agro Holding). He established a transport company to run airports in the Krasnodar region, including Sochi and Krasnodar.

All these assets form part of the diversified investment and industrial group Basic Element. Deripaska is the founder of Basic Element, a diversified investment group established in 1997 which has been managing investments in the following sectors: energy, metals and mining, machinery, financial services, agriculture, construction, and aviation. The major investments under Basic Element management included stakes in United Company RUSAL (the world's largest aluminium and alumina producer), GAZ Group (an automotive company), Aviakor aircraft manufacturer, EuroSibEnergo (ЕвроСибЭнерго (an energy supply company) Glavmosstroy (Главмосстрой) (a construction company) Kuban Agroholding (an agricultural company) and Basel Aero (an aviation business comprising the three largest airports in the Krasnodar territory, and a joint venture with Changi Airports International). Basic Element has been managing Deripaska's investments into companies in Russia, the CIS countries, Africa, Australia, Asia, Europe and Latin America, which employ as many as 250,000 people. Strikeforce Mining and Resources (SMR) is also controlled by Basic Element. Basic Element built several Olympic facilities for 2014 Winter Olympics in Sochi, including the Coastal Olympic Village, Imeretisnkiy sea port, Doubler of Kurortny Avenue in Sochi, renovation of the Sochi International Airport. The total investments account for over $1.4 billion.

During the 2008 financial crisis, Deripaska temporarily had to sell his 25% stake in Austrian construction company Strabag, but bought them back in 2010. In return, Strabag obtained a 26% stake in Transstroy.

=== Troubles with US travel, 2006–2009 ===
In 2008, whilst Deripaska was involved in a bid to buy the Daimler Chrysler Group, The Guardian reported that the United States canceled his entry visa due to "criminal associations and relationships". The Wall Street Journal likewise reported that it could have been because Deripaska has been accused of having links to organized crime in Russia and cited as their sources two unnamed U.S. law enforcement officials. The New York Times reported on 27 August 2018 that the visa had been revoked on concerns Deripaska might attempt to launder money through real estate transactions. Deripaska had received a multiple-entry visa in 2005; a U.S. Federal Bureau of Investigation spokesman refused to comment. Lobbying on his behalf had been done by former Senate Republican leader and 1996 presidential candidate Bob Dole and his law firm, Alston & Bird, Senate records show. Alston & Bird was paid about US$260,000 in 2005 for work on "Department of State visa policies and procedures" tied to Deripaska.

In 2009, Deripaska was again allowed entry and visited the United States twice. The Wall Street Journal reported that according to two unnamed FBI administration officials, Deripaska met with agents regarding a continuing criminal probe, the details of which were not known or reported. During Deripaska's visits, he met with leading management figures from investment banks Goldman Sachs and Morgan Stanley. The aluminium company that Deripaska headed, United Company RUSAL, was in preparations for an initial public offering. The easing of Deripaska's visa issues, which were an issue for possible investors, helped to reassure bankers. The State Department has never said why it revoked his visa and refused to comment on his 2009 visits. The visits were arranged outside of the usual process as the U.S. continues to have concerns about Deripaska's business associations. Deripaska has repeatedly denied a connection to any organized crime and said business rivals have caused the visa to be revoked by smearing him. When interviewed by the BBC in July 2009, Deripaska said that the authorities in the United States had been attempting to blackmail him by revoking his visa and thus affecting possible investors in a negative way and thereby hoping to push Deripaska into cooperating with them.

NBC News reported in October 2021 that Russia had given Deripaska diplomatic status, allowing him to enter the U.S. with immunity.

=== Magna and lawsuit against Morgan Stanley, 2015 ===
In May 2007, Magna International chairman Frank Stronach announced that Deripaska was becoming a strategic partner in Magna. In 2007, Deripaska's Veleron investment vehicle acquired stock in Magna through a $1.2 billion loan from BNP Paribas, with Magna shares serving as collateral. Morgan Stanley was involved in the deal through a swap agreement with BNP Paribas where the US bank assumed the risks of the loan in return for a fixed payment from Paribas.

In September 2008, Magna's stocks plummeted, hit by the global economic downturn. BNP issued a $93 million margin call to Veleron. Morgan Stanley, in turn, learned that Veleron was unlikely to meet the call and sold the stock short. Deripaska claimed that Morgan Stanley abused its duties and engaged in unlawful insider trading that resulted in significant financial damage to Veleron, estimated at $15 million to $25 million.

In 2015, Deripaska filed a lawsuit against Morgan Stanley, accusing the bank of using insider information to short sell Deripaska's $1.5 billion investment in shares of Canadian-based Magna International in 2008. The New York jury determined in November 2015 that Morgan Stanley had "acquired inside information and traded on it despite a duty to keep it confidential and not trade on it", finding as well that Morgan Stanley did not have the intent to defraud Veleron. Veleron strongly disagreed with and said it would file an appeal.

=== En+ Group ===
The group was formed in 2006, with Deripaska as president and controlling shareholder. The En+ Group is a diversified mining, metals and energy group. It owns a majority stake in UC Rusal (48.13%) and in EuroSibEnergo.

In 2017, it reported adjusted core earnings of $2.3 billion on revenues totaling $9.8 billion. In November 2017, En+ was listed on the London Stock Exchange raising $1.5 billion.

=== Metals and mining ===
==== RUSAL ====
United Company RUSAL is the world's second largest aluminium company. It was the largest until it was overtaken by China Hongqiao Group in 2015. In 2019, Rusal was overtaken by China's Chalco as the second biggest listed producer of aluminium. As of 2018, UC RUSAL accounts for 5.8% of the world's primary aluminium output and 6.2% of the world's alumina production.

In order to ensure a stable supply of alumina to its smelters, several mergers and acquisitions were accomplished by RUSAL under Deripaska. At the beginning of the 2000s, RUSAL acquired bauxite mines in Guinea, a country with the world's largest bauxite reserves. Subsequently, RUSAL acquired a stake in an alumina refinery in Australia. At Deripaska's behest, in 2007, RUSAL, SUAL Group, one of the world's top 10 aluminium producers; and Glencore International AG, the Swiss natural resources group, merged their assets to form United Company RUSAL, the world's largest aluminium and alumina producer.

After the merger with Glencore, bauxite and alumina assets in Jamaica, Italy and Ireland were added to RUSAL's portfolio. These transactions converted RUSAL from a company with few supplies of the raw material bauxite into a vertically integrated corporation.

In parallel, Deripaska invested significantly in the operational improvement of smelters inside Russia. He said, "We consolidated the industry, and located bauxites that do not exist in Russia. We established the company that became the leader of industry in less than twelve years. But to become the number one aluminium producer in the world, we had to improve our operations practice. To apply the best practices in the world, we looked at Toyota, which had utilized a precise, deep and well thought-through process for almost thirty years of operations."

Deripaska himself has been an active supporter of Japanese production efficiencies made popular by the "Toyota Way." RUSAL smelters have adopted the concept of kaizen, which means continuous improvement and involves training workers in standardized production techniques. "It's important to change both the company's mind set and reporting lines", Deripaska said. "Instead of top-down management, you should understand everything is in the hands of your operator and empower that operator to drive efficiencies and improvements directly on the factory floor."

Under Deripaska's leadership, RUSAL constructed and commissioned Khakas aluminium smelter outside of Sayanogorsk in Russian Siberia. The Khakas facility was the first aluminium smelter built in post-Soviet Russia (since 1985). The smelter, with an annual capacity of 300,000 tonnes, was as of 2006 one of the most technologically advanced in the world. The company also undertook large-scale modernization projects at a number of its facilities, including the Bratsk, Krasnoyarsk and Irkutsk aluminium smelters.

Deripaska returned in 2009 to RUSAL as CEO to lead the company through the debt restructuring process. "I worked 16-hour days. We were in default, although none of the parties involved wanted to call it default." As part of contingency measures, Deripaska cut costs at RUSAL by 25% in 2009. By December 2009, Deripaska reached a final agreement with over 70 Russian and international lenders to refinance US$17 billion of debt.

In 2017, Rusal issued two Eurobonds to finance its debts. The first one, worth $600 million, was issued in February, followed by the second one in April, worth $500 million. Also in February, plans were announced to sell 10 billion yuan worth of seven-year onshore bonds to finance purchases in China. This made Rusal the first foreign company to offer panda bonds on the Shanghai Stock Exchange. The company also agreed on a pre-export finance mechanism with international lenders worth $1.7 billion for debt refinancing.

In 2013, Deripaska was awarded the "Aluminium Industry Ambassador Award" in the Metal Bulletin Awards for Excellence for his "great influence within the global aluminium industry and the wider market".

Deripaska stepped down from RUSAL in May 2018 the day after seven board members and the chief executive resigned. The move was part of a deal with the US Treasury to get U.S. sanctions removed from the company. As part of that deal, in February 2019 it was announced that Deripaska had reduced his ownership stake in EN+ to below 50% in order to obtain sanctions relief.

===== Cherney lawsuit, 2008 =====
Michael Cherney brought legal action against Deripaska in the Commercial Court of the High Court in London. Cherney sought a declaration that he was the beneficial owner of 20% of RUSAL stock which, he claimed, Deripaska held in trust for him. The claim was denied. On 3 May 2007, Justice Langley ruled that Deripaska had not been properly served, and that the court had no jurisdiction to try the claim as Deripaska did not live in England or Wales.

In July 2008, Justice Christopher Clarke ruled that the case should be tried in England, although "the natural forum for this litigation is Russia", because, he held, "risks inherent in a trial in Russia...are sufficient to make England the forum in which the case can most suitably be tried in the interest of both parties and the ends of justice". On 22 July 2008, he granted Deripaska the right to appeal. The Court of Appeal of England and Wales rejected the appeal on 31 July 2009.

At a June 2011 case management conference, the judge deferred a decision on whether Cherney would be allowed to give evidence by video link from Israel rather than appear in person. An outstanding arrest warrant issued by Interpol meant that the British would detain him if he travelled to the UK. In late July 2011, the High Court ruled to allow Cherney to give evidence at the trial by video link from Israel, and also set trial for April 2012. Deripaska denied that Cherney was owed any stake in RUSAL, and asserted payments made to Cherney had been for unavoidable "protection" at a time when violence was sweeping the region and posed an existential threat to any profitable business in the country. In an interview with The Telegraph, Deripaska said he was one of the few who worked to clean up Russian industry and provided support to law enforcement agencies. However, in this early chaotic period paying protection money to criminal gangs was inescapable, as revealed in court testimony. In September 2012, Cherney terminated his UK lawsuit against Deripaska.

=== Energy ===
==== EuroSibEnergo ====
EuroSibEnergo controls and manages 18 power plants with a combined installed energy capacity of 19.5 GW, including 15 GW provided by hydrogeneration. The company produces approximately 9% of all electricity in Russia and is also the leader in the Siberian energy market, with a market share totaling 41%. Some of EuroSibEnergo's key clients include the largest aluminium plants in Russia. The company owns large fuel resources, which satisfy over 85% of the coal needs of its thermal power and boiler plants. Its coal reserves amount to 1.26 billion tons, with annual coal production exceeding 12 million tons.

En+ Group, of which EuroSibEnergo is a subsidiary, is investing in a joint venture with China's largest hydroelectric power generation company China Yangtze Power Co to build new power plants in Siberia, primarily hydroelectric ones, with a total capacity of up to 10 GWt.

=== Machinery ===
==== Russian Machines ====
Russian Machines corporation was established in 2005 and unites Deripaska's machine building assets. It comprises industrial and engineering assets in the following industries: automotive OEM (GAZ Group), automotive components (RM-Systems), rail industry (RM Rail), aircraft OEM (Aviacor), road construction (RM-Terex) and agricultural machinery (AGCO-RM).

Russian Machines Corporation manages 24 facilities located across 12 regions in Russia.

In September 2017, Deripaska entered into a joint venture through his Russian Machines (Russian: «Русские машины») with AGCO called AGCO-RM SPIC project (Russian: проекта СПИКа АГКО-РМ).

==== GAZ Group ====
In 2000, Deripaska started acquiring machine building assets. His first acquisition was Nizhny Novgorod-based Gorkovsky Automobile Plant (GAZ), which was previously a government-run company. In 2005, GAZ Group was established by combining Deripaska's machine building assets.

The Russian automotive conglomerate, GAZ Group, comprises 18 manufacturing facilities in eight regions of Russia, as well as sales and service organizations. GAZ Group produces light and medium commercial vehicles, heavy trucks, buses, cars, road construction equipment, power units, and automotive components.

In March 2019, GAZ Group asked the Russian government for $468 million in support claiming that US sanctions placed on Deripaska could cut production by almost 40% in the second half of that year.

==== Airports ====
Basel Aero, a joint venture between Changi Airports International, Basic Element and Sberbank of Russia, is a company-operator the Sochi, Krasnodar and Anapa airports.

These airports handle more than 7% of the total passenger flow in Russia. Sochi International Airport was the main gateway to Sochi 2014 Winter Olympics and successfully serviced the guests and participants of the Games.

In October 2014, Sochi was granted open skies status, meaning that any foreign carrier may pick up and drop off passengers and cargo with no restrictions on aircraft type, frequency, and regardless of interstate agreements.

=== Financial services ===
Deripaska personally holds 10% of Ingosstrakh's ordinary shares. The company is a leading insurer of complex risks such as insurance for ship owners, ship hull insurance, insurance against aviation and space-related risks, and insurance of transportation companies. Ingosstrakh has 83 branches in Russia and the company's offices operate in 220 Russian towns and cities.

=== Agribusiness ===
In 2011, Deripaska established Kuban Agroholding, a 75,000-hectare agribusiness in the Krasnodar region. The company integrates two dairy farms, а 16,000 pig capacity breeding complex, three elevators with non-recurrent grain storage capacity of more than 270,000 tonnes, three grain processing plants, a sugar factory and the Sunrise horse breeding farm, specializing in the breeding of English thoroughbred horses. It is one of the top-20 largest agribusinesses and top-5 most efficient land users in Russia.

Kuban Agroholding is one of the few agrocompanies in Russia involved in embryo transfer technology that allows for the reproduction of high-yielding milk cows using less-productive surrogates.

The company has gained significant media attention for its corn-seeding program, deploying several dozen corn brands selected by its genetic specialists.

According to Forbes in June 2019, Deripaska's Kuban land bank was the fourteenth largest in Russia.

=== Redut PMC ===
Redut, also known as Redoubt or Redut-Antiterror and formerly known as "Shield", is a Russian Private Military and Security Company (PMSC) that is part of the "Antiterror-family". Redut consists of similarly named PMSCs which protect commercial operations of Russian companies. Redut is currently deployed by Russia in the Russian invasion of Ukraine, for which it was sanctioned. Several fighters of the group have been convicted of war crimes during the invasion.

Oleg Deripaska and Gennady Timchenko reportedly are major backers of the company. The PMC received armored personnel carriers, helmets, and protective vests from them.

Deripaska refutes these claims, saying that he had "never provided any form of support, financing or backing to any military companies or groups".

=== Other roles ===
In 2004, Deripaska was appointed by the President of Russia to represent the country in the Asia-Pacific Economic Cooperation Business Advisory Council (ABAC). He has been Chairman of ABAC Russia since 2007. Deripaska is the vice president of the Russian Union of Industrialists and Entrepreneurs, chairman of the executive board of the Russian national committee of the International Chamber of Commerce and a member of the Competitiveness and Entrepreneurship Council, an agency of the Russian government.

Since 2007, he has been a permanent participant at World Economic Forum sessions, when RUSAL became a WEF "strategic partner".

== Investigations ==
In 2009, Deripaska had been interrogated as a witness in Spain and England and by the FBI about money laundering, he was never charged with any crimes. On 25 January 2010, the Financial Times published a story titled "Rusal: A lingering heat" exploring Deripaska's business relations with Sergei Popov and Anton Malevsky, alleged heads of Russian organized crime groups. Deripaska has accused Michael Chernoy of using Malevsky and the Izmailovskaya syndicate to extort US$250 million from him as part of a protection racket. However, Deripaska has himself been accused of having similar links to Malevsky, who, with his brother Andrei, owned a 10% stake in Deripaska's company. Deripaska denies the claims. In 2011, Deripaska and Iskander Makhmudov (head of UGMK) were asked by Spanish police to answer questions in relation to a money-laundering enquiry.

In November 2011, Spain's High Court sent the criminal cases against Deripaska to the Russian General Prosecutor's office because the root of the cases is Russian.

== Political relationships and controversies ==
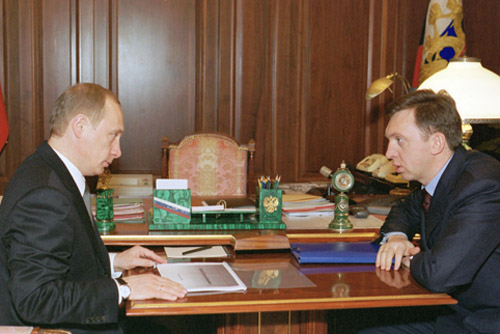
Vladimir Putin and Deripaska, 19 March 2002

=== Vladimir Putin ===
Deripaska is known for his close ties with Russian president Vladimir Putin. Their relationship became visibly strained amidst Deripaska's financial struggles in 2009. In an incident broadcast on Russian television, Putin visited a stalled cement factory owned by Deripaska and berated its management. He forced Deripaska to sign a contract promising to pay nearly $1 million in unpaid wages. Their relationship recovered, however, and Deripaska has been described as "Putin's favorite industrialist". Leaked U.S. diplomatic cables from 2006 described Deripaska as "among the 2–3 oligarchs Putin turns to on a regular basis" and "a more-or-less permanent fixture on Putin's trips abroad". In a 2011 interview with The Globe and Mail, Kinross Gold CEO Tye Burt, who knows Deripaska, said "I believe Russia recognizes Oleg's major role in building a renewed economic base in a broad range of domestic businesses and rejuvenating ailing companies and infrastructure."

=== Nathaniel Rothschild and Peter Mandelson ===
Deripaska is a friend of Nathaniel Rothschild, a major investor in both Glencore and United Company RUSAL. Together Deripaska and Rothschild hosted George Osborne and Peter Mandelson on Deripaska's yacht in Corfu in the summer of 2008. Osborne was then Shadow Chancellor of the Exchequer of the United Kingdom and a friend of Rothschild from school and university. Peter Mandelson has reportedly maintained private contacts over several years with Deripaska.

News of the contacts sparked criticism because, as European Union Trade Commissioner, Mandelson had been responsible for decision to cut aluminium tariffs from 6 to 3%, a decision that had benefited Deripaska's Company RusAl. Mandelson insisted that he had never discussed aluminium tariffs with Deripaska. On 26 October 2008 the Shadow Foreign Secretary William Hague claimed the "whole country" wanted "transparency" about Mandelson's previous meetings with Deripaska. In response, Prime Minister Gordon Brown said Mandelson's dealings with Deripaska had been "found to be above board". Mandelson said that meeting business figures from "across the range" in emerging economies was part of his brief as EU Trade Commissioner. On 29 October 2008, while Mandelson was on a ministerial visit to Moscow, it was alleged in the British press that Valery Pechenkin, the head of security at Deripaska's company Basic Element, organised a swift entry visa for Mandelson when he came to Moscow to visit Deripaska in 2005.

=== Paul Manafort ===
On 22 March 2017, the Associated Press published a report alleging that Paul Manafort, Donald Trump's former presidential campaign manager, negotiated a $10 million annual contract with Deripaska to promote Russian interests in politics, business, and media coverage in Europe and the United States, starting in 2005. Both Deripaska and Manafort confirmed working together in the past, but rejected the contents of the AP story. Manafort argued that his work had been inaccurately presented, and that there was nothing “inappropriate or nefarious" about it.

Responding to the allegations, on 28 March 2017, Deripaska published open letters in the print editions of The Washington Post and The Wall Street Journal in which he denied having signed a $10 million contract with Manafort in order to benefit the Putin government. He also stated willingness to testify before the United States Congress about these allegations, and argued that the accusations were part of "the negative context of current US-Russian relations." Congressional sources cited by The New York Times said lawmakers declined Deripaska's request after he had asked for immunity from criminal prosecution. Unnamed officials argued that "immunity agreements create complications for federal criminal investigators".

On 15 May 2017, Deripaska filed a defamation and libel lawsuit against the Associated Press in U.S. District Court in D.C., arguing that the report falsely claimed that Deripaska had signed a contract with Manafort to advance the goals of the Russian government. The lawsuit was dismissed in October 2017 on the grounds that Deripaska had not disputed "any material facts" in the story by the Associated Press.

While Manafort served within the 2016 U.S. presidential campaign, it is alleged that Manafort, via Kyiv-based operative Konstantin Kilimnik, offered to provide briefings on political developments to Deripaska. Behaviors such as these were seen by writers at The Atlantic as an attempt by Manafort "to please an oligarch tied to" Putin's government.

=== Alleged involvement in Russian interference in the 2016 United States elections ===
In February 2018, Alexei Navalny published a video about a meeting between Deripaska and Deputy Prime Minister of Russia Sergei Eduardovich Prikhodko on a yacht traveling near Norway. According to Navalny, Deripaska probably served as a middle man between the Russian government represented by Prikhodko and Paul Manafort during Russian interference in the 2016 United States elections. Prikhodko denied the allegations, accusing Navalny of "mixing the facts" about his "friend" Deripaska, Donald Trump and Paul Manafort, while also voicing his wish to have talk with Navalny as a "man with a man".

A day after the video was published, the Roskomnadzor added the video to the Federal List of Extremist Materials, thus making accessing the video illegal for all Russian citizens. It also ordered YouTube to remove seven videos and Instagram to take down 14 points that were cited in the investigation; neither YouTube nor Instagram had responded as of 12 February 2018. According to a Roskomnadzor representative who spoke to Vedomosti, a "court injunction of this sort against content hosted on Instagram and YouTube is unprecedented for Russia". The New York Times noted that this may presage a "more aggressive approach by the Russian government" to control online activities.

In March 2018, fearing her own death while incarcerated in Bangkok, Anastasia Vashukevich, a Belarusian escort also known as Nastya Rybka who claimed to have over 16 hours of audio recordings she said could shed light on possible Russian interference in American elections. She offered the recordings to American authorities in exchange for asylum, but was deported and arrested in a Russian airport. Vashukevich said the recordings from August 2016 include Deripaska discussing the United States presidential election with three English-speakers who Vashukevich believed were American. "Deripaska had a plan about elections", Vashukevich said. In court, Vashukevich apologized to Deripaska, and said Russian agents visited her in jail to urge her to cease public statements about him. The New York Times argued that her claims might be easily dismissed were it not for the Navalny video. Deripaska denies an intimate history with Vashukevich.

=== Alleged child sex abuse ring involvement ===
According to Verstka and iStories, Deripaska was involved in a child sexual abuse ring which was active from 2018 to 2019. The ring operated under the guise of regional beauty pageants for teenage girls across Russia. Journalists from these outlets alleged the sexual abuse took place in June 2019 in Krasnodar Krai. Following publication of the stories, Verstka and iStories experienced DDoS attacks on their Telegram channels.

== Sanctions ==
Australian sanctions

On 18 March 2022, Australia added Deripaska to its sanctions list.

Canada sanctions

Deripaska was sanctioned by Canada under the Special Economic Measures Act (S.C. 1992, c. 17), in relation to the Russian invasion of Ukraine, for Grave Breach of International Peace and Security.

European Union sanctions

On 8 April 2022, the EU added Deripaska to its sanctions list, freezing his assets and imposing a travel ban in all member states. On 30 November 2022, Deripaska filed an appeal against the EU's decision to sanction him.

Ukraine has claimed that assets belonging to Deripaska had been moved into the name of Siegfried Wolf, an Austrian citizen paid by Deripaska to avoid sanctions.

UK sanctions

Following the 2022 Russian invasion of Ukraine, Deripaska was sanctioned by the British government. This involved freezing his assets and a travel ban.

Deripaska-linked UK company Terra Services Ltd. was raided in December 2018.

U.S. sanctions

In April 2018, the United States imposed sanctions on Deripaska and 23 other Russian tycoons and officials. The statement of the United States Department of the Treasury said that Deripaska "ha[d] been accused of threatening the lives of business rivals, illegally wiretapping a government official, and taking part in extortion and racketeering".

In May 2018, it was reported that Deripaska had to return three private jets owned by Credit Suisse and Raiffeisen.

In October 2018 the U.S. Treasury announced that it had extended until 12 December a deadline for the full imposition of sanctions against Rusal and its parent company En+ Group, pending the review of the proposals presented by En+ Group to the U.S. government that would see Deripaska reduce his stake in En+ to below 45 per cent from around 70 per cent.

In January 2019 the U.S. Treasury lifted the sanctions on companies formerly controlled by Deripaska. Sanctions on Deripaska himself remained in effect. In April 2019, the U.S. Treasury Department nonetheless allowed Deripaska to transfer 10.5 million shares of his holding company En+ Group to a trust fund for his children as part of a divorce settlement with his ex-wife Polina Yumasheva, which had been finalized before the sanctions were put in place. The deal to have U.S. sanctions removed from En+ Group was brokered by Greg Barker, a UK legislator, who in February 2019 went on to be appointed chairman of En+ Group.

In March 2019, Deripaska sued the United States, alleging that it had overstepped its legal bounds in imposing sanctions on him and made him the "latest victim" in the FBI probe into Russia's interference in U.S. elections. U.S. District Court Judge Amit Mehta dismissed the suit in June 2021, ruling it lacked merit. On 3 October 2022, the US Supreme Court rejected the oligarch's appeal.

On 29 September 2022 the United States Attorney for the Southern District of New York accused Deripaska of sanctions evasion. According to the prosecutor's office, Deripaska, through Gracetown Inc., illegally used the U.S. financial system to service real estate objects owned by him. In this he was assisted by two women: Olga Shriki, who operated in the United States, and Natalia Bardakova, who directed Shriki from Russia. They are also charged with violating U.S. sanctions. Chriqui was arrested on 29 September. All three "are charged with one count of conspiring to violate and evade U.S. sanctions, in violation of the International Emergency Economic Powers Act, which carries a maximum sentence of 20 years in prison," the statement says. Graham Bonham-Carter has been charged with helping Deripaska evade sanctions.

In January 2023, Charles McGonigal, a former head of counterintelligence in the FBI New York City field office, was charged with conspiring with co-defendant Sergey Shestakov, a former Soviet and Russian diplomat who is a U.S. citizen, to provide services to Deripaska in 2021, in violation of U.S. sanctions imposed on Deripaska in 2018. They allegedly did so by investigating a rival Russian oligarch in return for concealed payments from Deripaska, using shell companies in the contract that outlined the services to be performed, using a forged signature on that contract, and using the same shell companies to send and receive payment from Deripaska.

== Personal life ==
Deripaska was married to Polina Yumasheva, the daughter of Boris Yeltsin's top adviser Valentin Yumashev and stepdaughter of Yeltsin's daughter Tatyana. While Yeltsin was president, Deripaska's close ties put him in Yeltsin's inner circle, dubbed "The Family". Deripaska and Yumasheva were married from 2001 to 2018. The Deripaskas have two children: a son, Pyotr (born 2001), and daughter, Maria (born 2003). Deripaska practices yoga, swimming, horseback riding, and hiking. At his home near Moscow, he has seven horses and six dogs.

In March 2018, it was reported that Deripaska had successfully acquired Cypriot citizenship in 2017, under that country's golden visa rule, which generates billions in revenue for the island nation. According to documents seen by The Guardian, Deripaska's first attempt to become a citizen of a country in the EU was unsuccessful because of a preliminary inquiry into his activities in Belgium. This inquiry was dismissed in 2016.

In 2009, Deripaska's ranking fell to No. 164, with Forbes stating: "[H]e may not withstand collapsing markets and heavy debts".

In 2010, his estimated $US10.7 billion fortune allowed him to rise to No. 57 of the World's Billionaires list. According to Forbes magazine, he removed the heads of his two largest companies and personally negotiated with the Russian government, banks, and other creditors to restructure his loan obligations. Deripaska himself in 2007 was reported to have consistently said that the estimate of his wealth was exaggerated, that it did not completely account for the amount of debt he incurred, and that he should be ranked far below the top ten on the list of the Russian billionaires.

Forbes estimated his fortune at $US3.3 billion in 2015, $5.2 billion in 2017, $3.3 billion in 2019, $3.8 billion in 2021, $2.5 billion in 2023, In July 2025, Forbes estimated his net worth to be $US4.1 billion.

Deripaska's Cypriot−registered company Edenfield Investments acquired the Grade II listed Hamstone House in the St George's Hill district of Weybridge, Surrey, in 2001. Since 2006, Deripaska has owned the Haft mansion near Embassy Row in Washington, D.C., through a company incorporated in Delaware.

He owns a mansion in Belgravia.

=== Charitable and other activities ===
Oleg Deripaska sits on the board of trustees of the Bolshoi Theatre, and has financed ballet performances like Flames of Paris, La Sylphide, and Paquita as well as operas like The Legend of the Invisible City of Kitezh and the Maiden Fevroniya, Carmen, and Wozzeck.

In 1998, Deripaska established a charitable foundation in Russia, Volnoe Delo. The fund supports initiatives in Russia aimed at developing education and science, preserving spiritual and cultural heritage, and improving standards in public health. Since 1998, Deripaska claims to have invested in more than 500 charity programs in 50 regions of Russia. Volnoe Delo has supported research activities in the 2,550-year-old city of Phanagoria since 2004. More than $10 million has been allocated to Phanagoria fieldwork over the past 14 years. Today, Phanagoria is one of the best-equipped archaeological sites in Russia and has a scientific and cultural center, equipment and technology for above-ground and underwater excavation, as well as a team of specialists involved in the excavation process. In 2014, Volnoe Delo foundation launched a programme for students' early career guidance and professional training—JuniorSkills. The first, pilot, championship on professional skills, JuniorSkills Hi-Tech, was held in the Urals city of Yekaterinburg in 2014, part of the nationwide championship on cross-industry blue-collar professions in high-tech "WorldSkills". In 2020 during the pandemic of COVID-19 it bought new ambulances and sent them to twelve Russian towns in Siberia and the Urals.

Deripaska was a member of the International Council at Harvard University's Belfer Center for Science and International Affairs.

In 2017, during the West African Ebola virus epidemic Deripaska personally initiated construction of the Centre for Epidemic and Microbiological Research and Treatment in the Guinean Kindia province. The centre was designed and constructed by RUSAL specialists with the assistance of Rospotrebnadzor scientists (RUSAL has invested $10 million).

In February 2014, Deripaska financed the construction of makeshift kennels to house stray dogs that had been abandoned by construction workers after completing work on the Sochi Olympic Village.

In October 2015 Deripaska called for governments not to agree to the Paris climate accords since they lacked legally-binding mechanisms and arguing that countries like India and China needed to contribute more to avoid competition problems.

In 2020, during the pandemic he donated money to construct hospitals in Siberia.

As part of a public relations campaign, he said in April 2021 that Rosstat (Federal State Statistics Service) data showing that there are 17.8 million poor people living below the country's subsistence minimum was wrong, and that the correct number was about 80 million.

Deripaska criticized the Russian invasion of Ukraine on several occasions. On 20 December 2022, a Russian court had ordered the seizure of a luxury hotel complex in Sochi worth $1 billion owned by Deripaska. The seizure might be triggered by Deripaska's criticism of the war.

He sits on the board of trustees of the School of Business Administration, the School of Public Administration, and the School of Economics at Moscow State University as well as the School of Business Administration at St. Petersburg State University. Deripaska is a co-founder of the National Science Support Foundation and the National Medicine Fund. In 1999, he was awarded the Order of Friendship, a state award of the Russian Federation.

== See also ==
- List of Russian billionaires
- Mueller report
- Russian oligarchs
- Timeline of Russian interference in the 2016 United States elections
- Timeline of Russian interference in the 2016 United States elections (July 2016 – election day)
- Timeline of post-election transition following Russian interference in the 2016 United States elections
- Timeline of investigations into Donald Trump and Russia (January–June 2017)
- Timeline of investigations into Donald Trump and Russia (July–December 2017)
- Timeline of investigations into Donald Trump and Russia (January–June 2018)
- Timeline of investigations into Donald Trump and Russia (July–December 2018)
- Timeline of investigations into Donald Trump and Russia (January–June 2019)
- Timeline of investigations into Donald Trump and Russia (July–December 2019)
- Timeline of investigations into Donald Trump and Russia (2020–2022)
