= Teimuraz Ramishvili =

Russian diplomat

Teimuraz Otarovich Ramishvili (Russian: Теймураз Отарович Рамишвили; born 4 May 1955), is a Russian diplomat of Georgian origin, the Russian Ambassador to South Korea in 2000-2005, Ambassador Extraordinary and Plenipotentiary, Ambassador to Denmark from 2008. He was the Ambassador of Russia to Norway between 2016 and 2024.

== Early life ==
- Graduated from the Moscow State Institute of International Relations in 1979.

== Political activity ==
- In 1992-2000 Director of the Department for Humanitarian Cooperation and Human Rights of the Russian Ministry of Foreign Affairs, Russia.
- 2000—2005 – Ambassador of Russia to South Korea.
- 2005—2007 - Ambassador at Large, Ministry of Foreign Affairs, Russia.
- 2007—2012 – Ambassador of Russia to Denmark.
- 2012—2016 - Director of the Department of Linguistic Support of the Russian Ministry of Foreign Affairs.
- 2016—2024 - Ambassador of Russia to Norway.

== International conferences activity ==
- Participated in many international conferences on humanitarian cooperation and human rights issues.
