= List of ambassadors of Russia to Thailand =

Ambassador of the Russian Federation to the Kingdom of Thailand
- Emblem of the Russian Foreign Ministry
- Incumbent; Yevgeny Tomikhin since 2 November 2018
- Ministry of Foreign Affairs; Embassy of Russia in Bangkok
- Style: His Excellency
- Reports to: Minister of Foreign Affairs
- Seat: Bangkok
- Appointer: President of Russia
- Term length: At the pleasure of the president
- Website: Russian Embassy in Thailand

The ambassador extraordinary and plenipotentiary of the Russian Federation to the Kingdom of Thailand is the official representative of the president and the government of the Russian Federation to the prime minister and the government of Thailand.

The ambassador and his staff work at large in the Embassy of Russia in Bangkok. The ambassador to Thailand is concurrently appointed as the Russian representative to the United Nations Economic and Social Commission for Asia and the Pacific. The post of Russian ambassador to Thailand is currently held by Yevgeny Tomikhin, incumbent since 2 November 2018.

== History of diplomatic relations ==
Contacts between the Russian Empire and the Kingdom of Siam began in the early 1860s. On 19 February 1863 the Imperial Russian Navy warships Gaydamak and Novik anchored at the port of Bangkok. Siam was also one of the countries visited by explorer Nicholas Miklouho-Maclay, in 1876 and 1877, during his visits to the Asia-Pacific region. Relations between the two countries were particularly strong during the later nineteenth century, with Russia supporting Siam's independence in the face of European colonial expansion. Russia dispatched a naval squadron under Rear-Admiral Avraamy Aslanbegov to represent it at the centennial celebrations of the Chakri dynasty in 1882. There were royal visits between the two countries over the following years, and at the visit of King Chulalongkorn to Emperor Nicholas II in July 1897, diplomatic relations were formalised. On 4 December 1897 Aleksandr Olarovsky was appointed Minister-Resident, and the consulate general of Russia was opened in Bangkok on 14 April 1898.

Relations were warm into the early twentieth century, until the Russian Revolution in 1917 brought an end to the Russian Empire. Diplomatic relations were maintained during the brief period of the Russian Provisional Government, but ended after the October Revolution brought the Bolsheviks to power. Relations between the Soviet Union and Siam were established on 12 March 1941, with the two states agreeing to exchange diplomatic missions in 1947. Sergey Nemchina was appointed as Soviet representative, and the embassy in Bangkok was opened in 1948. After the dissolution of the Soviet Union in 1991 the Thai government recognized the Russian Federation as successor state of the USSR on 28 December 1991, and both countries have continued to exchange ambassadors.

== List of representatives (1897–present) ==
=== Russian Empire to the Kingdom of Siam (1897–1917) ===
Name	Title	Appointment	Termination	Notes
Aleksandr Olarovsky	Minister-Resident (until 1906); Plenipotentiary Minister (after 1906)	4 December 1897	9 July 1907	
Aleksandr Yakovlev	Minister-Resident	10 August 1907	April 1909	
Georgy Planson	Plenipotentiary Minister	25 January 1910	6 May 1916	
Iosif Loris-Melikov	Plenipotentiary Minister	6 May 1916	2 March 1917	

=== Russian Provisional Government to the Kingdom of Siam (1917) ===
Name	Title	Appointment	Termination	Notes
Iosif Loris-Melikov	Plenipotentiary Minister	3 April 1917	26 November 1917	

=== Soviet Union to Siam/Thailand (1947–1991) ===
Name	Title	Appointment	Termination	Notes
Sergey Nemchina	Envoy	3 July 1947	19 December 1950	
Fyodor Dolya	Envoy	19 December 1950	5 January 1956	
Ivan Yakushin	Envoy (until 30 June 1956); Ambassador (after 30 June 1956)	21 February 1956	12 August 1960	
Anatoly Nikolayev	Ambassador	12 August 1960	30 July 1965	
Mikhail Volkov	Ambassador	30 July 1965	24 July 1969	
Anatoly Rozanov	Ambassador	22 January 1970	6 March 1974	
Boris Ilichev	Ambassador	6 March 1974	22 June 1978	
Yuri Kuznetsov	Ambassador	22 June 1978	17 October 1984	
Valentin Kasatkin	Ambassador	17 October 1984	22 October 1987	
Anatoly Valkov	Ambassador	22 October 1987	21 March 1991	
Oleg Bostorin	Ambassador	21 March 1991	25 December 1991	

=== Russian Federation to Thailand (1991–present) ===
Name	Title	Appointment	Termination	Notes
Oleg Bostorin	Ambassador	26 December 1991	6 September 1997	
Valery Malygin	Ambassador	6 September 1997	29 January 2001	
Yevgeny Ostrovenko	Ambassador	29 January 2001	9 November 2004	
Yevgeny Afanasyev	Ambassador	9 November 2004	3 February 2010	
Aleksandr Mariyasov	Ambassador	3 February 2010	25 August 2014	
Kirill Barsky	Ambassador	25 August 2014	2 November 2018	
Yevgeny Tomikhin	Ambassador	2 November 2018		
