= Ernst von Stackelberg =

Baltic German military personnel and diplomat

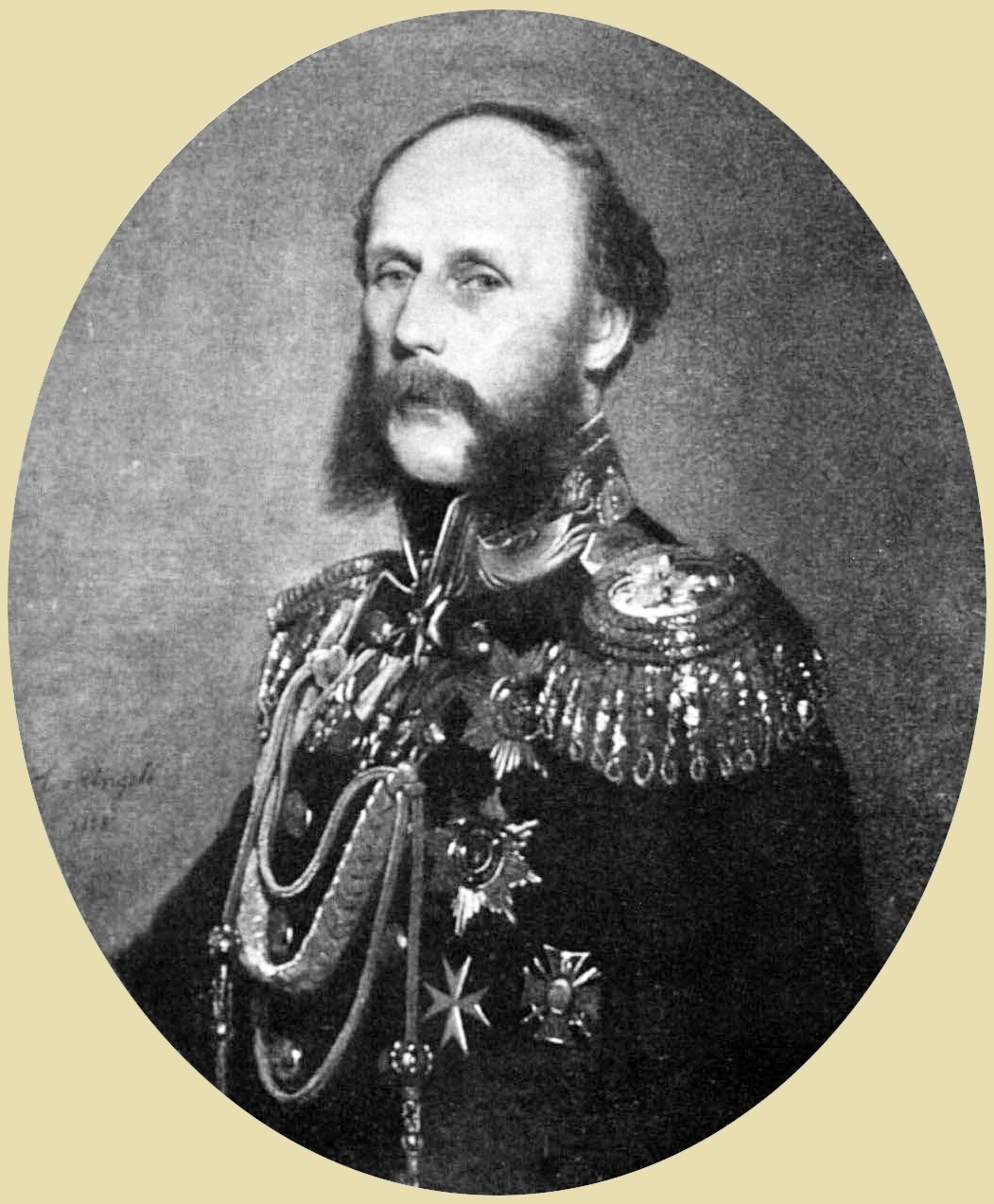
- Photograph of Stackelberg
- Born: 1813; Vienna
- Died: 30 August 1870 (aged 56–57) Paris
- Allegiance: Russian Empire
- Service years: 1832–1846, 1848–1856
- Rank: Major general
- Other work: envoy extraordinary; minister plenipotentiary; general adjutant; ambassador extraordinary and plenipotentiary

Count Ernst Johann von Stackelberg (Russian: Эрне́ст Густа́вович Шта́кельберг) (1813 – 30 August 1870) was a Baltic German military figure and diplomat.

== Biography ==
After having received home education, Stackelberg entered military service in 1832 as a cannoneer (German: feuerwerker) in Leib Guard horse artillery. In 1833, he was promoted to junker and then warrant officer a year later. After two years of service in horse artillery, Stackelberg was sent to the Caucasus, where he would take part in several military campaigns (e.g., the Kuban Campaign of 1836 under the command of General Alexei Velyaminov and the 1837 campaign against the Chechens). For his service, Stackelberg was promoted to the rank of podporuchik and then transferred to the office of War Minister Alexander Chernyshyov as adjutant. In 1840, he was promoted to the rank of poruchik and sent to Caucasus yet again to participate in military action. Stackelberg was first placed under the command of Lieutenant General Apollon Galafeyev and took part in the Battle of the Valerik River with the Chechens in Chekhinsky Forest. Later on, Stackelberg was transferred to the unit under the command of General Grigory Zass (commander of the right flank of the Caucasus front) and fought against the mountaineers from over the Kuban River. For his outstanding service, Stackelberg was promoted to the rank of staff captain and awarded with the Order of Saint Vladimir, 4th Class. Upon his return from the Caucasus in 1841, Stackelberg continued his service as adjutant and was then promoted to the rank of colonel in 1843. Three years later Stackelberg was dismissed from service on indefinite leave for health reasons. In 1848, however, he was called for active duty again and sent to the Russian diplomatic mission in Paris. His diplomatic service in France, however, turned out to be short-lived, for he was recalled to the War Ministry yet again. In 1852, Stackelberg was sent to the Russian diplomatic mission in Vienna. That same year, he was promoted to the rank of major general and then appointed to His Majesty’s retinue in 1853. In 1856, Stackelberg was entrusted with the post of envoy extraordinary and minister plenipotentiary in Kingdom of Sardinia and held this post for the next five years. In 1860, Stackelberg was promoted to the rank of His Majesty’s general adjutant. In 1861, he was appointed envoy extraordinary and minister plenipotentiary to Spain and then sent to Italy in the same capacity a year later. In 1863, Stackelberg was moved to Vienna as envoy extraordinary and minister plenipotentiary. Four years later, he was appointed ambassador extraordinary and plenipotentiary to Paris, where he would die on 30 August 1870.
