= Valerik =

Valerik may refer to:

- Valerik River, a river in the Chechen Republic, Russia
- Battle of the Valerik River, 1840 battle fought at this river
- Valerik (poem), Mikhail Lermontov's poem about this battle
- Valerik, Achkhoy-Martanovsky District, a rural locality (a selo) in the Chechen Republic, Russia
