= Taymaskha Gekhinskaya =

Chechen military leader

Taymaskha Gekhoy
- (Chechen: Гиххойн Таймасха)
- Born: Unknown; Gekhi (now Urus-Martan district, Chechnya)
- Known for: Caucasian War

Taimaskha Gekhoy (Russian: Тайма́сха Гехи́нская); fl. 1820 – c. 1860) (Chechen: Гиххойн Таймасха) was a Chechen military leader, unit commander and participant in the Caucasian war.

== Life ==
Taymaskha Gekhinskaya fought for ten years against the Tsarist troops in the Caucasian War, commanding a detachment. In 1840, she participated in the Battle of the Valerik River.

According to Lieutenant General Apollo Galafeev, on February 15, 1842, a Tsarist detachment led by Lt. Col. Sulimovsky and a Chechen detachment led by Naib Shamil Akhverdy-Magom took place near Bolshaya Yandyrka. A detachment of the Ingush regular police fought on the side of the Russian troops. Among the 23 Chechens captured was Taymaskha Gekhinskaya (Khalid Oshaev disputes the number of prisoners. According to him, two seriously wounded Chechens were taken prisoner, besides Taymaskha). The prisoners were sent to Vladikavkaz.

Emperor Nicholas I became aware of the capture of Taimaskha. Since she was known to him, on his orders, Taimaskha was taken to the palace in her national attire, in which she fought. She was given money to travel to St. Petersburg and purchase clothes. On the road, she was accompanied by a Cossack officer Fedor Grigoriev. The officer was ordered not to take his eyes off her, not to turn off the indicated route and, in case of illness, to escort her to the nearest hospital. Taimaskha was thanked by the Emperor as a sign of admiration for her courage and released.

Chief of Staff Major General Kotzebue wrote:

"Captured with arms in her hands on April 15, 1842, near the Yandyrka tract, a Chechen woman Taimaskha Molova was demanded by the High Command in St. Petersburg, upon her arrival she was introduced to the Emperor and was honored to receive a precious gold chain from the Empress, after that, with the permission of His Majesty, she was sent back to the Caucasus with a cornet, Prince Dal Alkhasov, with the issuance of 100 silver rubles to her for travel expenses".

Gekhinskaya spent three weeks in St. Petersburg. On October 4, she was taken to Stavropol, and then to the Grozny fortress. Although Taimaskha's Gekhi native village was not far away, she was not allowed to go home. She filed a petition in which she announced her desire to return the gold chain presented to her by the Empress and to receive its value from the treasury. This desire caused a great commotion among the Caucasian authorities and reached the emperor. In the end, she was allowed to return to her native village.

== In culture ==
The Chechen writer Lecha Yakhyaev dedicated her book Gikhkhoyn Taymaskha (Chechen: Taymaskha Gekhinskaya) to her.

== Links ==
- Dukhaev A.I. Honorary captive of Taymash. arhiv-chr.ru. Archival Administration of the Government of the Chechen Republic (2016). Retrieved: January 19, 2017.
- Lecha Yahyaev. Gihkhoyn Taymaskha. chenetbook.info. Retrieved: February 16, 2018.
