= Alexey Meshkov =

Russian diplomat and politician

- Алексей Мешков
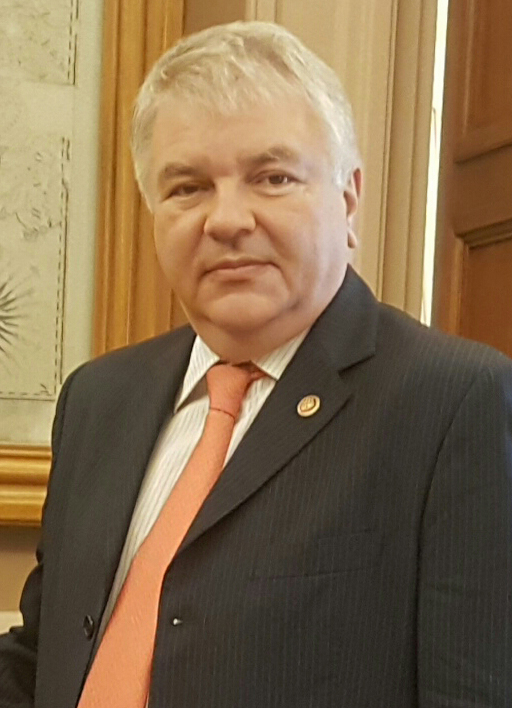

Senator from Tver Oblast
- Incumbent
- Assumed office 24 September 2026
- Preceded by: Lyudmila Skakovskaya

Russian Ambassador to France
- In office 23 October 2017 – 24 September 2026
- Preceded by: Aleksandr Orlov

Deputy Minister of Foreign Affairs
- In office 25 December 2012 – 23 October 2017
- Preceded by: Alexander Grushko
- Succeeded by: Alexander Grushko

Russian Ambassador to Italy
- In office 20 January 2004 – 14 December 2012
- Preceded by: Nikolai Spassky
- Succeeded by: Sergei Razov

Personal details
- Born: 22 August 1959 (age 67) Moscow, Soviet Union
- Party: Independent
- Education: MGIMO

Alexey Yuryevich Meshkov (Russian: Алексей Юрьевич Мешков; born August 22, 1959, in Moscow, RSFSR, USSR) is a Soviet and Russian diplomat and politician. He holds the rank of Ambassador Extraordinary and Plenipotentiary (awarded in 2004). He served as Deputy Minister of Foreign Affairs of the Russian Federation (2012–2017). He is a member of the Russian International Affairs Council and the Council on Foreign and Defense Policy. Since September 2026 he is a senator in the Federation Council representing the executive branch of Tver Oblast.

== Biography ==
In 1981, he graduated from MGIMO and began his diplomatic career at the Ministry of Foreign Affairs of the USSR. He is fluent in English, Italian, and Spanish.

From 1981 to 1986, he served as a duty officer, attaché, and third secretary at the Embassy of the USSR in Spain.

From 1986 to 1992, he held the positions of third, second, and first secretary, and later served as a department head within the Directorate for Scientific and Technical Cooperation at the Ministry of Foreign Affairs of the USSR.

From 1992 to 1997, he served as first secretary, counselor, and senior counselor at the Embassy of Russia in Spain. During his time in Spain, he worked under the leadership of Igor Ivanov, who would later become the Minister of Foreign Affairs of Russia.

From 1997 to 1998, he was deputy director of the Department for Pan-European Cooperation at the Russian Ministry of Foreign Affairs.

From 1998 to 2001, he served as Head of the Foreign Policy Planning Directorate and subsequently as Director of the Foreign Policy Planning Department at the Russian Ministry of Foreign Affairs; he was also a member of the Ministry's Collegium.

From September 6, 2001, to January 20, 2004, he served as Deputy Minister of Foreign Affairs of Russia.

From January 20, 2004, to December 14, 2012, he served as Ambassador Extraordinary and Plenipotentiary of the Russian Federation to Italy. From February 27, 2004, to December 14, 2012, he served as Ambassador Extraordinary and Plenipotentiary of the Russian Federation to San Marino (concurrently).

From September 2, 2006, to December 14, 2012, he served as Permanent Representative of the Russian Federation to the Food and Agriculture Organization of the United Nations and the UN World Food Programme (concurrently).

From December 25, 2012, to October 23, 2017, he served as Deputy Minister of Foreign Affairs of the Russian Federation.

On October 23, 2017, he was appointed Ambassador of the Russian Federation to France and, concurrently, to the Principality of Monaco.

In March 2022, he was summoned to the French Ministry of Foreign Affairs over cartoons posted on the Twitter account of the Russian diplomatic mission. One image depicted European countries on their knees, licking the buttocks of Uncle Sam, with the caption in English: "European solidarity as it is". A second image showed Europe dying on a bed, with the United States and the European Union injecting substances labeled "neo-Nazism", "Russophobia", and "COVID-19" into her via syringes. Following the summons, the images were removed from Twitter. The Russian Foreign Ministry provided no substantive comment on the situation.

On September 24, 2026, Alexey Meshkov was appointed as the new senator for the Tver Region by the region's elected governor, Vitaly Korolyov. At the same time, he was relieved of his duties as Russia's Ambassador to France.
