= Vladimir Potemkin =

Soviet diplomat, historian and educator (1874–1946)

- Владимир Потёмкин
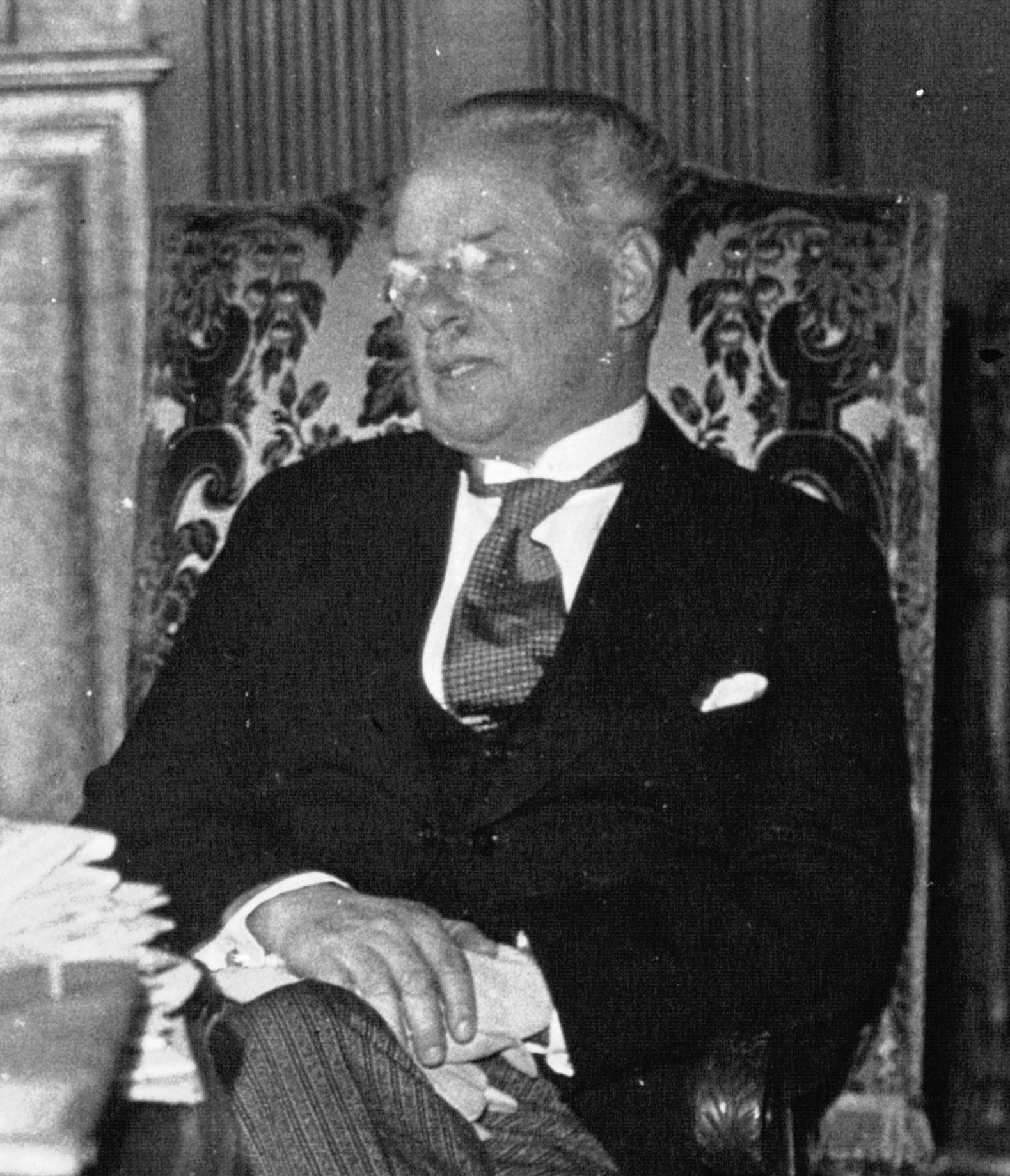
- Potemkin in 1934

People's Commissar for Education
- In office 28 February 1940 – 23 February 1946
- Premier: Vyacheslav Molotov; Joseph Stalin
- Preceded by: Pyotr Tyurkin
- Succeeded by: Position abolished (Aleksei Kalashnikov as Minister of Education of the USSR)

Plenipotentiary Representative of the Soviet Union to France
- In office 25 November 1934 – 4 April 1937
- Premier: Vyacheslav Molotov
- Preceded by: Marcel Rosenberg (as Charges de Affairs)
- Succeeded by: Yakov Surits

Plenipotentiary Representative of the Soviet Union in Italy
- In office 26 September 1932 – 25 November 1934
- Premier: Vyacheslav Molotov
- Preceded by: Dmitry Kursky
- Succeeded by: Boris Shtein

Personal details
- Born: 19 October [O.S. 7 October] 1874 Tver, Russian Empire
- Died: 23 February 1946 (aged 71) Moscow, Russian SFSR, Soviet Union
- Resting place: Kremlin Wall Necropolis, Moscow
- Party: All-Union Communist Party (b) (1919–1946)
- Education: Imperial Moscow University
- Occupation: Politician; historian; educator; scholar
- Awards: Order of Lenin Order of the Red Banner Order of the Red Banner of Labour
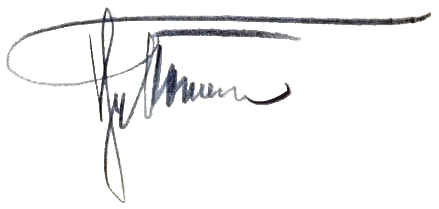
- Signature

Vladimir Petrovich Potemkin (Russian: Владимир Петрович Потёмкин; 19 October [O.S. 7 October] 1874 – 23 February 1946) was a Soviet statesman, historian, educator, diplomat, academic and scholar who served as the People's Commissar of Education of the Russian Soviet Federative Socialist Republic from 1940 to 1946.

== Early life and education ==
Potemkin was born into a family of doctors. In 1893, he graduated from the Tver gymnasium in 1893 and entered the History and Philology faculty of Imperial Moscow University.

While studying in the university he was active in the student movement and distributed illegal literature among other students. He was arrested for his revolutionary activities and imprisoned in the Butyrka prison. Potemkin eventually graduated from the university in 1898 and obtained his professorship later on and became a teacher at the Moscow School of the Order of St Catherine.

== Early career ==
From 1903, he reentered the revolutionary movement and actively participated in the First Russian Revolution. Potemkin who was a teacher of a women's gymnasium in Yekaterinoslav was expelled and sent to Moscow.

He continued his underground activities by promoting Marxist literature on behalf of the Moscow Committee of Russian Social Democratic Labour Party (b). From February 1917 he worked in the department of out-of-school education of the Moscow Provincial Zemstvo Council. In this position, he was the organizer of the first workers' university in the city of Bogorodsk, Moscow province.

After the October Revolution, he worked in the field of public education in the Moscow Provincial Council, participated in the establishment of the first workers' university. From 1918 to 1919, he worked in the school policy department of the People's Commissariat for Education. At Potemkin's initiative, the All-Russian Teachers' Courses were organized, and the First Congress on Public Education and the First All-Russian Congress on Extracurricular Education were convened.

In 1919, he joined the Russian Communist Party (b) and until 1920 served on the fronts of the Civil War, holding the posts of a member of the Revolutionary Military Council of the Sixth Army, head of the political department of the Western and then of the Southern Fronts. After the war he headed the Odessa provincial department of public education, at the same time being the head of the provincial military-political courses.

== Diplomatic career ==
While he was in Odessa, Potemkin met with Felix Dzerzhinsky and with his suggestion became involved in diplomatic work.

Already in the same year, he was a member of the Russian Red Cross commission for the repatriation of Russian soldiers from France and in the summer of 1923 he was appointed chairman of the commission for the repatriation of former Russian soldiers and Nekrasov Cossacks from Turkey.

From 1924 to 1929 he was in diplomatic work in Turkey, occupying the post of consul general in Istanbul from 1924 to 1926 and from 1927 to 1929 he was adviser to the Soviet embassy. From 1929 to 1932 he was a plenipotentiary representative in Greece.

In 1932 he was appointed to the post of plenipotentiary representative of the Soviet Union in Italy. While in this position, Potemkin managed to establish friendly relations with Benito Mussolini, for which, according to the memoirs of M.V. Kanivez, he was repeatedly criticized. In 1933 he signed the Soviet-Italian treaty of friendship, non-aggression and neutrality.

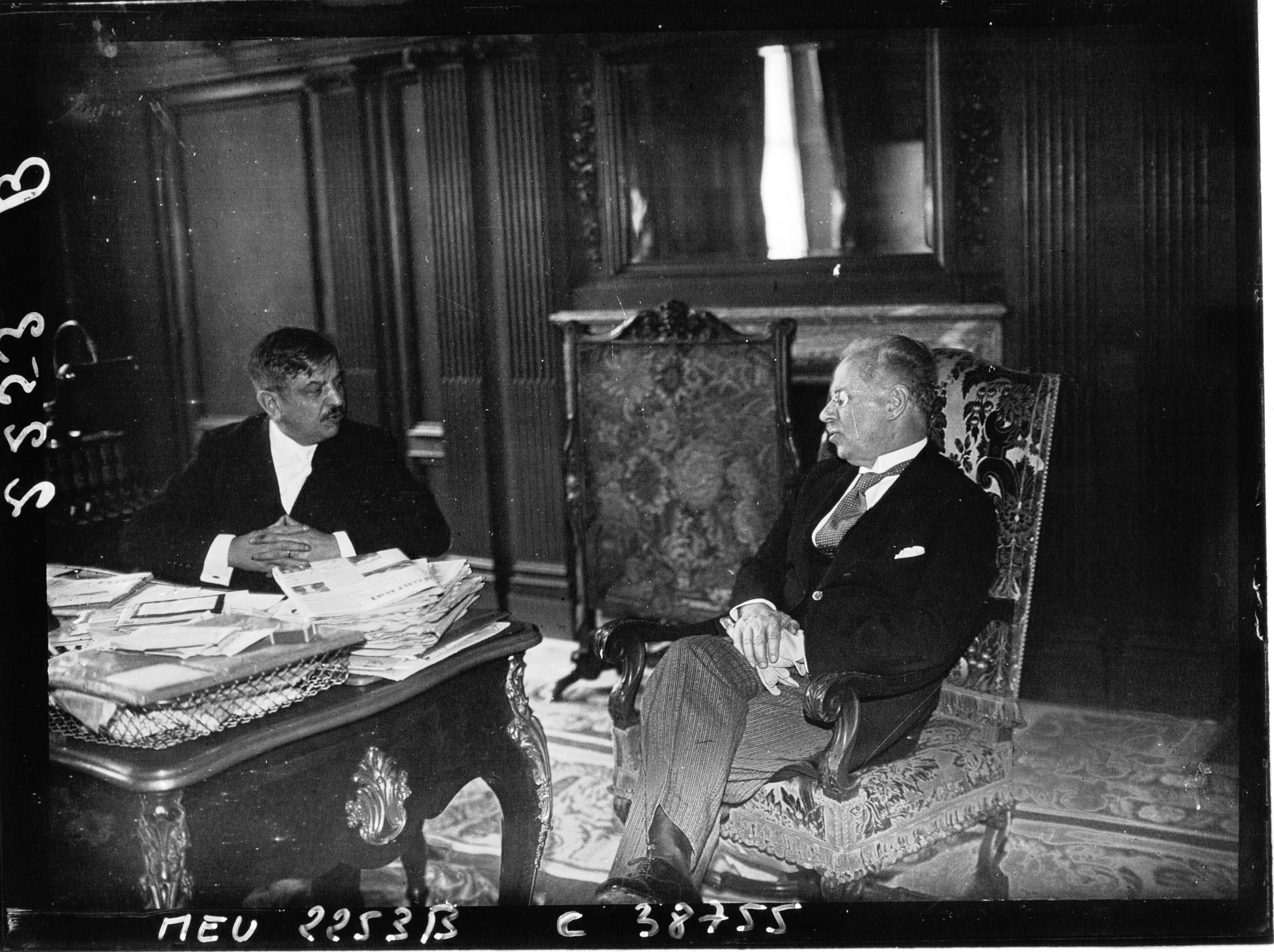
French President of the Council Pierre Laval and Vladimir Potemkin in Paris, December 1934.

In 1934, Vladimir Potemkin was a member of the Soviet delegation to the Assembly of the League of Nations. In the same year he was appointed to the post of the plenipotentiary of the Soviet Union in France. In this position in 1935 he participated in the negotiations and signing of the Franco-Soviet treaty on mutual assistance. In 1936 he signed an agreement to extend the 1934 Franco-Soviet trade agreement.

== Commissar of Education and later career ==
He was Member of the Central Executive Committee of the Soviet Union from 1935. In 1937 he returned to work in Moscow, taking the post of First Deputy People's Commissar for Foreign Affairs of the USSR. In the same year he was elected a deputy of the Supreme Council of the Soviet Union. In 1939 he was elected a member of the Central Committee of the All-Union Communist Party (b). As First Deputy People's Commissar for Foreign Affairs, he took part in a number of important military negotiations, including the Moscow negotiations of 1939 and the Soviet–Turkish negotiations aimed at keeping Turkey from participating in the coming World War II.

From February 28, 1940, until his death on February 23, 1946, he was the People's Commissar of Education of the RSFSR. On Potemkin's initiative, the Academy of Pedagogical Sciences of the RSFSR was established in 1943, and he was its first president. In the same year he was elected a full member of the Academy of Sciences of the Soviet Union.

Vladimir Potemkin died on 23 February 1946. His ashes were buried in the Red Square near the Kremlin Wall Necropolis.

== Works ==
Potemkin's most important academic work has been a three volume study of international diplomacy, published after 1940 by Stalin's order and covering the period until 1939.
