= Valerik (river) =

Valerik, Valargthe
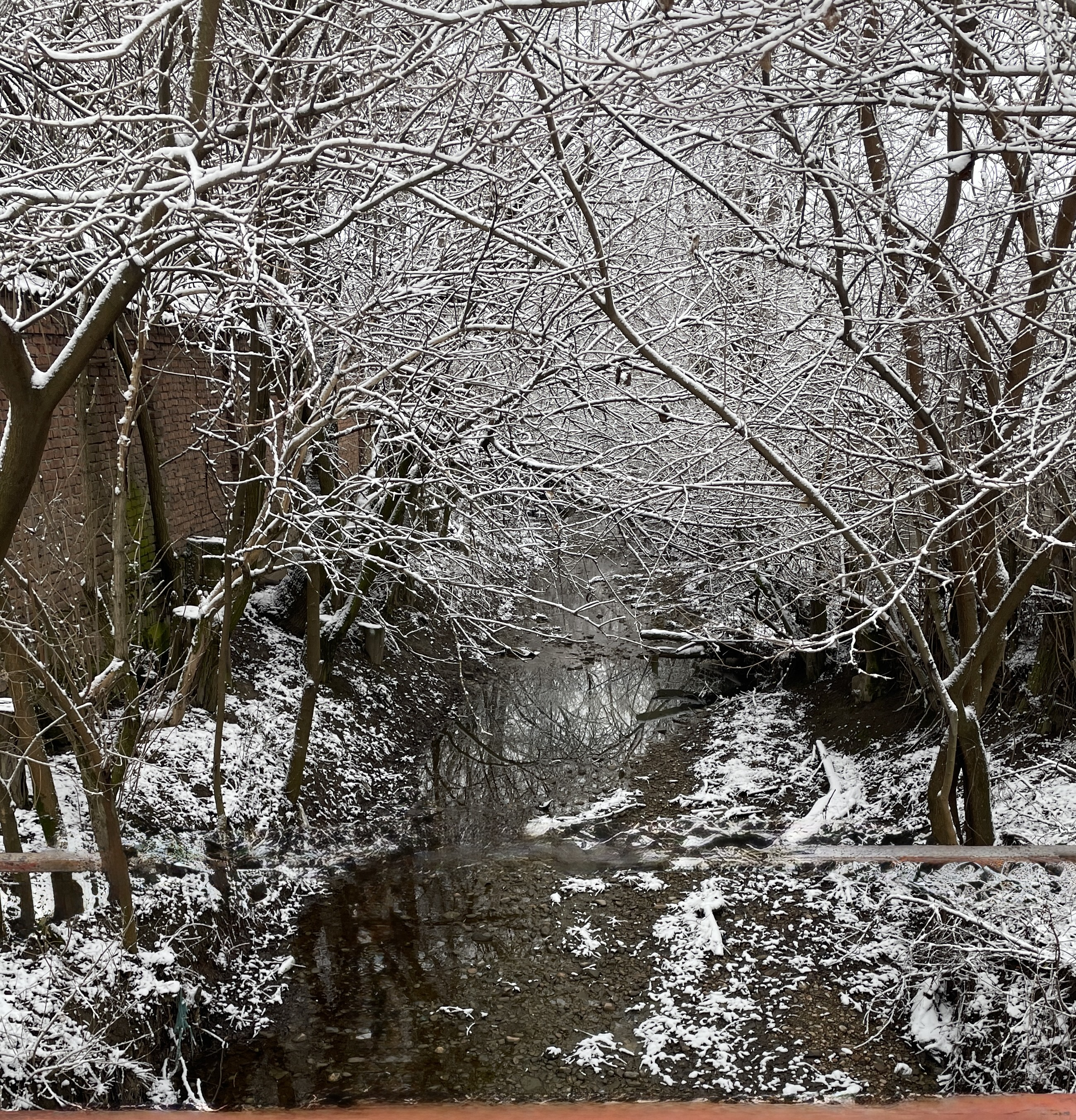

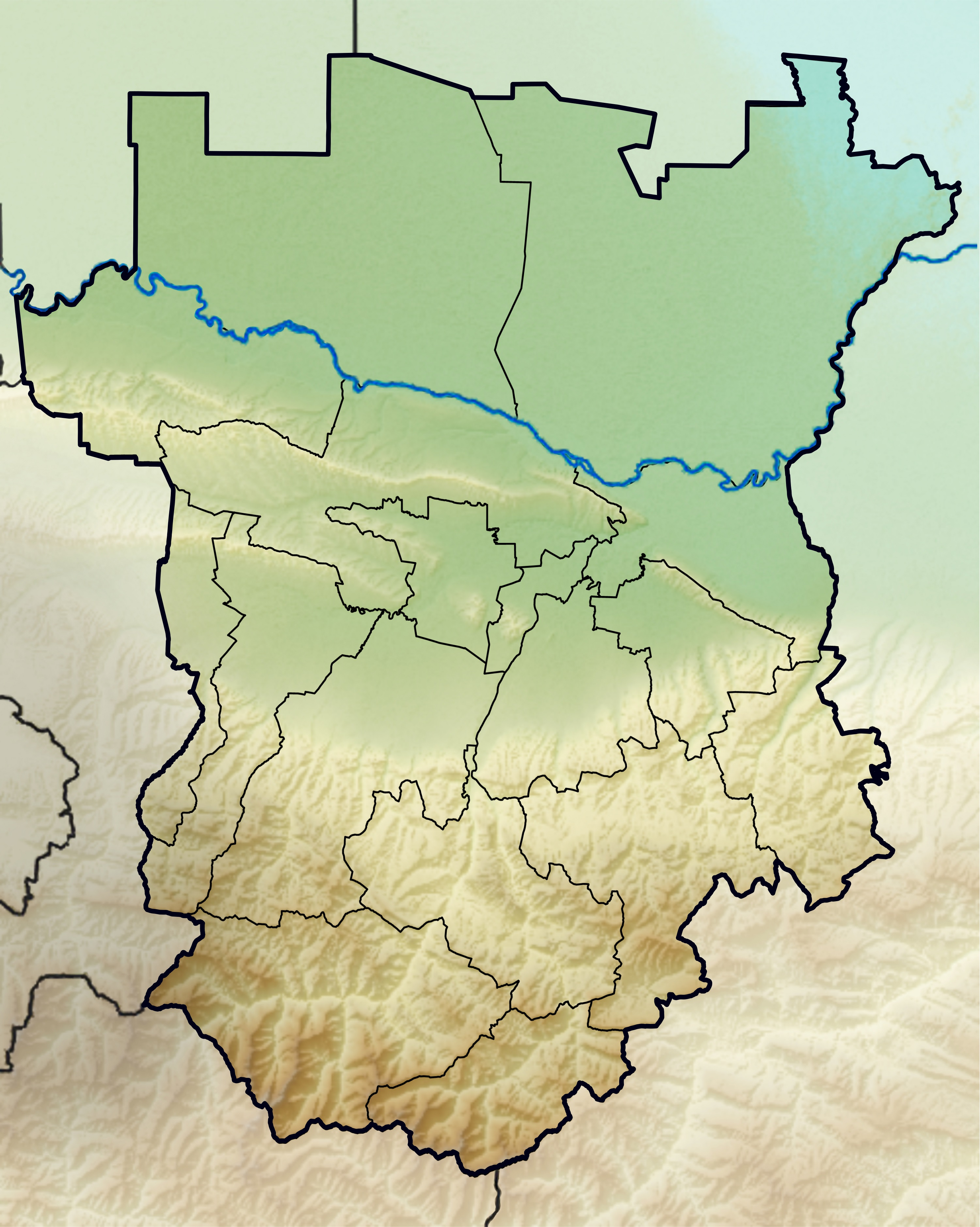
- Location within Chechnya Location within Caucasus Mountains

Location
- Country: Chechnya, Russia

Physical characteristics
- Source
  - location: Buloi-lam mountain
- Mouth: Sunzha
  - coordinates: 43.2453°N 45.4341°E
- Length: 29 km (18 mi)
- Basin size: 35 km^{2} (14 sq mi)

Basin features
- Progression: Sunzha→ Terek→ Caspian Sea

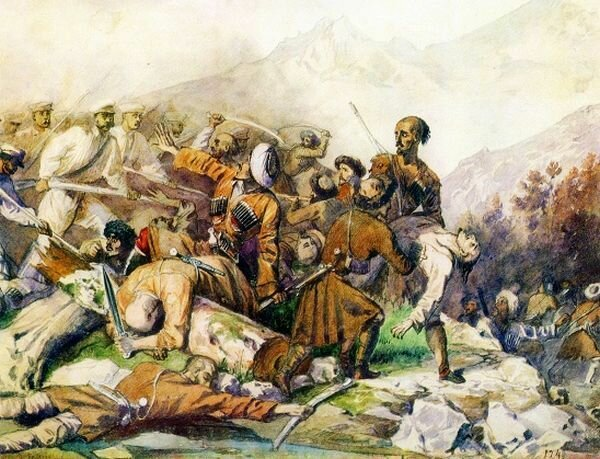
The Battle of the Valerik River by Mikhail Lermontov, 1840.

Valerik (Russian: Валери́к, Chechen: Валарта/Valargthe) is a little river in Chechnya, a tributary of the Sunzha. The river's lower stream becomes dry in summer. It is 29 kilometres (18 mi) long, and has a drainage basin of 35 square kilometres (14 sq mi).

== Etymology ==
The name of the river means "river of the dead" in Chechen. Possibly this river was a border between the Vainakhs and the Iranian peoples who lived in the steppe, and a place of bloody battles. A neighbouring river is named Mardan, which means 'river of the dead' in Ossetic languages.

== Battles ==
In 1840 two battles were fought at the banks of the river between Caucasian Imamate murids and the Russian Imperial Army advancing towards inner Chechnya.

The Russians under Apollon Galafeyev (first battle) and Pavel Grabbe (second battle) defeated the army of Imam Shamil on 11 July and 30 October respectively. After this battle Shamil withdrew from Chechnya and retreated to Caucasian Avaria.

The first battle of the Valerik River is described in Mikhail Lermontov's poem "Valerik". Lermontov was a participant in both battles and gained recognition as a hero, but due to Nicolas I's personal negative attitude towards Lermontov, he was not awarded a medal.

The meaning of Valerik as "the river of the dead" is still used metaphorically: the battle of Komsomolskoye was referred as a "Valerik of the late 20th century".
