= Anatoly Adamishin =

Russian diplomat, politician and businessman (1934–2025)

- Анатолий Адамишин

Minister for Cooperation with the CIS
- In office 28 August 1997 – 23 March 1998
- Prime Minister: Viktor Chernomyrdin
- Preceded by: Aman Tuleyev
- Succeeded by: Ministry dissolved

Ambassador of Russia to the UK
- In office 5 September 1994 – 6 June 1997
- Preceded by: Boris Pankin
- Succeeded by: Yury Fokin

Member of the State Duma
- In office 11 January – 11 May 1994
- Succeeded by: Sergey Mitrokhin
- Parliamentary group: Yabloko

First Deputy Foreign Minister
- In office October 1992 – October 1994
- Minister: Andrei Kozyrev

Ambassador of the Soviet Union/Russia to Italy
- In office 12 April 1990 – 24 December 1992
- Preceded by: Nikolay Lunkov
- Succeeded by: Valery Kenyaykin

Personal details
- Born: 11 October 1934 Kyiv, Ukrainian SSR, USSR
- Died: 13 August 2025 (aged 90)
- Education: Moscow State University
- Occupation: Diplomat; politician; author
- Awards

Anatoly Adamishin's voice
recorded September 2012

Anatoly Leonidovich Adamishin (Russian: Анатолий Леонидович Адамишин; 11 October 1934 – 13 August 2025) was a Russian diplomat, politician, and businessman.

== Life and career ==
Adamishin was born on 11 October 1934. He graduated from Moscow State University, and went on to work in various diplomatic posts in the central offices of the Ministry of Foreign Affairs and abroad.

From 1986 to 1990, he served as Deputy Minister of Foreign Affairs of the Soviet Union, in charge of African, humanitarian, and cultural affairs. From 1990 to 1992, Adamishin was the Ambassador of the Soviet Union, and then Russia, to Italy. Then, from 1992 until 1994, he became the 1st Deputy Minister of Foreign Affairs.

On 12 December 1993 he was elected to the 1st State Duma by the list of Yavlinsky-Boldyrev-Lukin bloc. He remained in the position of Deputy Minister, and in this regard, he resigned as member of parliament on 11 May 1994. He did not attend the sessions, and was nominally a member of the Committee on CIS Affairs and Relations with Compatriots. From 1994 to 1997, Adamishin was the Ambassador of Russia to the United Kingdom.

Adamishin spoke Russian, English, Italian, Ukrainian, and French.

Adamishin died on 13 August 2025, at the age of 90.

== Awards ==
Adamishin received several state honors, including two Orders of the Red Banner of Labour (1981, 1984), the Order of Friendship of Peoples (1975), and the Order of the Badge of Honour (1971). He was awarded the honorary title Honored Worker of the Diplomatic Service of the Russian Federation on April 18, 2005.

He was a Knight Grand Cross of the Order of Merit of the Italian Republic (1993).

In 2004, he was awarded the Certificate of Honour of the Government of the Russian Federation.

== Selected works ==
- Geschichte Der Sowjetischen Außenpolitik (History of Soviet Foreign Policy), with Aleksandr Berežkin and Andrej Gromyko (1980)
- Mezhdunarodnoe sotrudnichestvo v oblasti prav cheloveka : dokumenty i materialy (Международное сотрудничество в области прав человека : документы и материалы (International Cooperation in the Field of Human Rights: Documents and Materials)) (1993)
- Transnational Terrorism in the World System Perspective, with Ryszard Stemplowski (2002)
- Human Rights, Perestroika, and the End of the Cold War, with Richard Schifter (2009)
