= Arthur von Mohrenheim =

Russian diplomat (1824–1906)

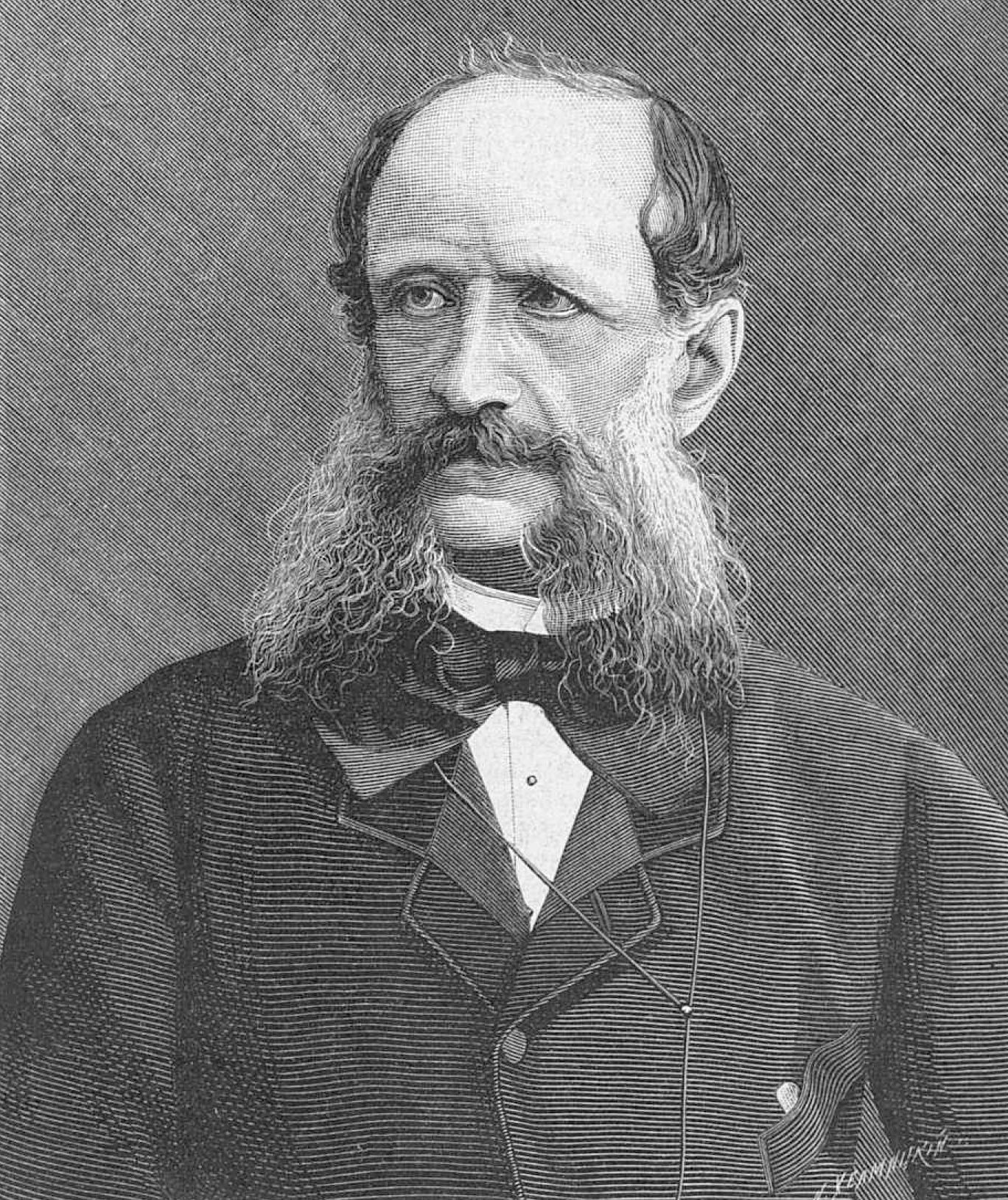
Mohrenheim in 1882

Baron Arthur Pavlovich von Mohrenheim (8 June 1824 – 19 October 1906; Russian: Артур Павлович Моренгейм) was a diplomat of the Russian Empire who served as ambassador to France from 1884 to 1897 and played a leading role in arranging the Franco-Russian Alliance. He was born on 8 June [O.S. 27 May] 1824 in Moscow to a noble family from the Grodno Governorate (modern Belarus) in 1824, and after studying at Imperial Moscow University he joined the Foreign Ministry in 1845. He served in the embassies in Vienna (1851–1856) and Berlin (1858–1867) before being appointed minister to Denmark in 1867. In 1882 he was named ambassador to the United Kingdom, where he served for two years before moving to France as ambassador in 1884. He was consistently committed to establishing a Franco-Russian pact, and directed the embassy in Paris towards that end. After over a decade in the post, Mohrenheim retired in 1897 and was appointed to the Russian State Council. He died in the Pyrenees at Pau on 19 October [O.S. 6 October] 1906.

Mohrenheim was awarded the Orders of Saint Alexander Nevsky, the White Eagle, Saint Anna (1st class), and Saint Stanislaus (1st class).
