= Sunzha (river) =

Waterway in Southern Russia

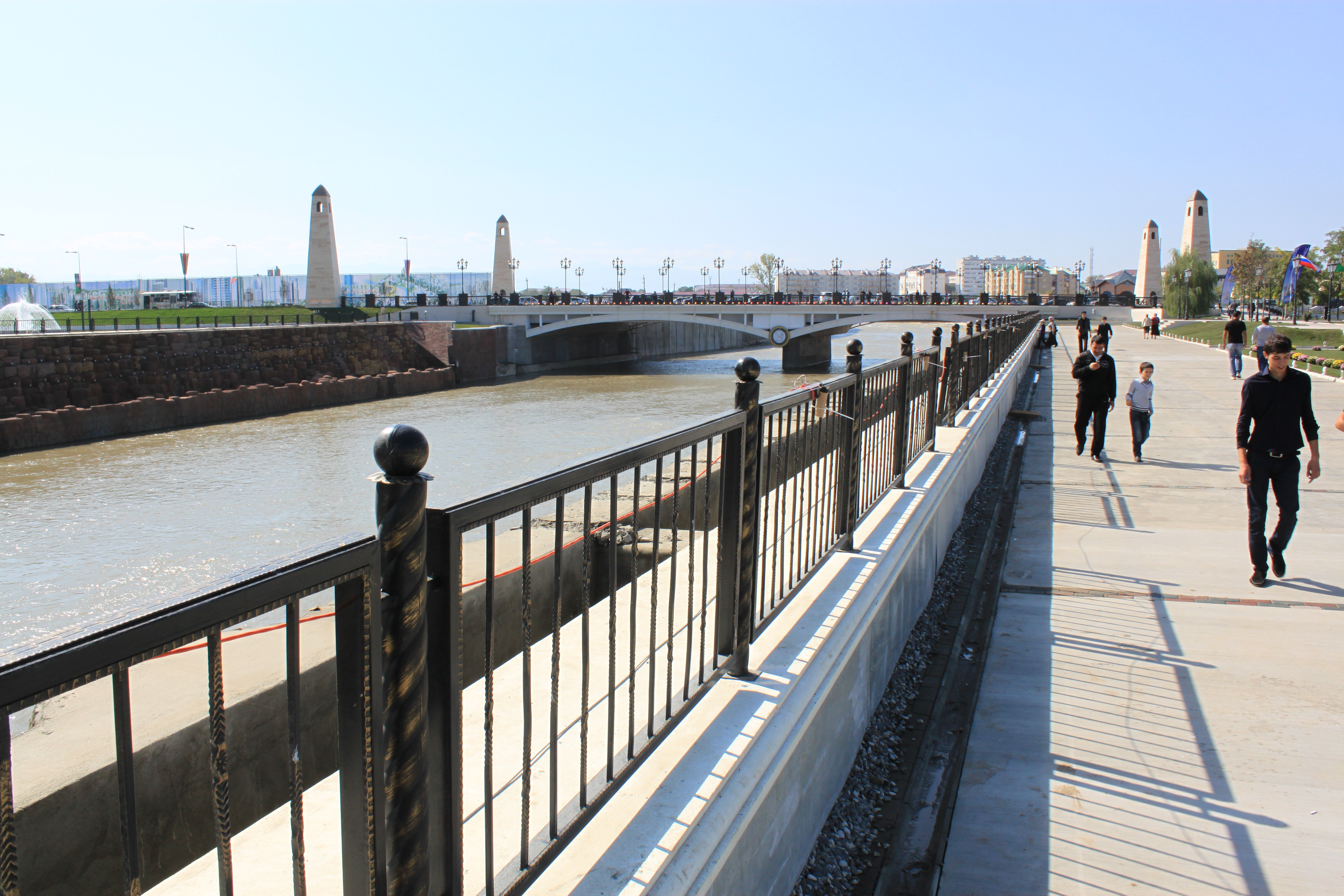
- The Sunzha in Grozny

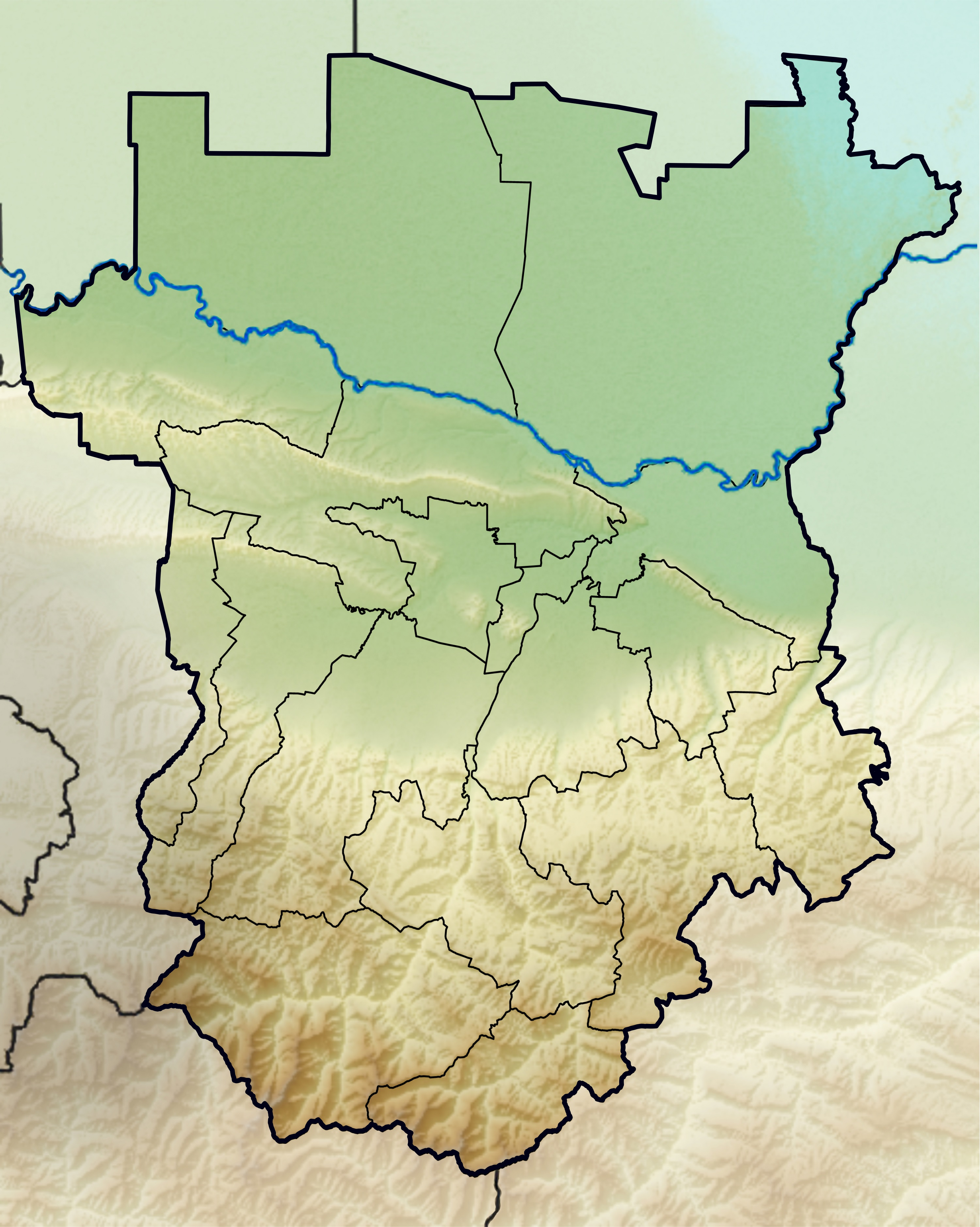
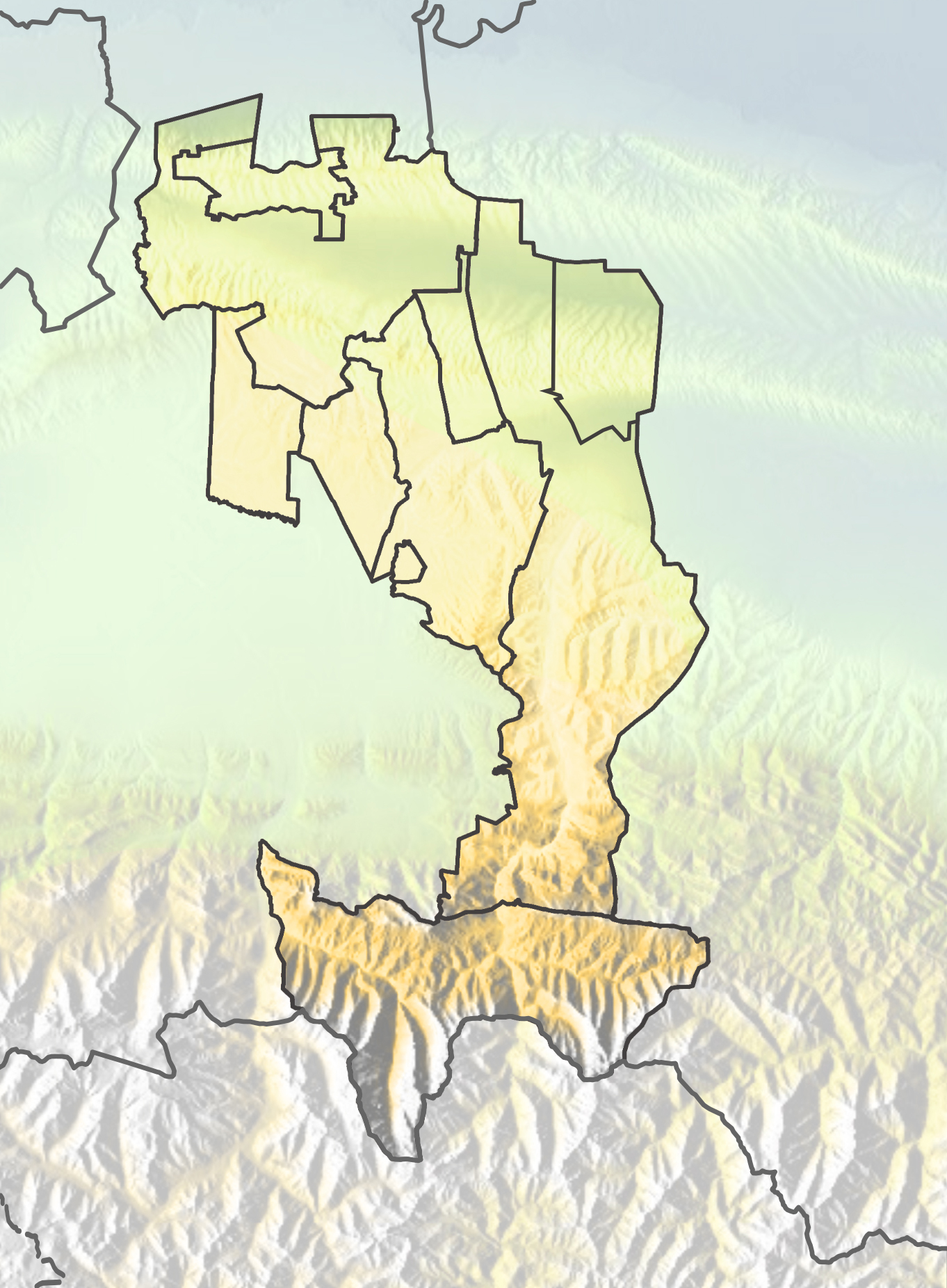
- Location within Chechnya Location within Republic of Ingushetia Location within Caucasus Mountains Location within European Russia

Location
- Country: North Ossetia, Ingushetia and Chechnya, Russia

Physical characteristics
- Source
  - location: Greater Caucasus, North Ossetia
- Mouth: Terek
  - coordinates: 43°26′27″N 46°08′05″E
- Length: 278 km (173 mi)
- Basin size: 12,000 km^{2} (4,600 mi^{2})

Basin features
- Progression: Terek→ Caspian Sea

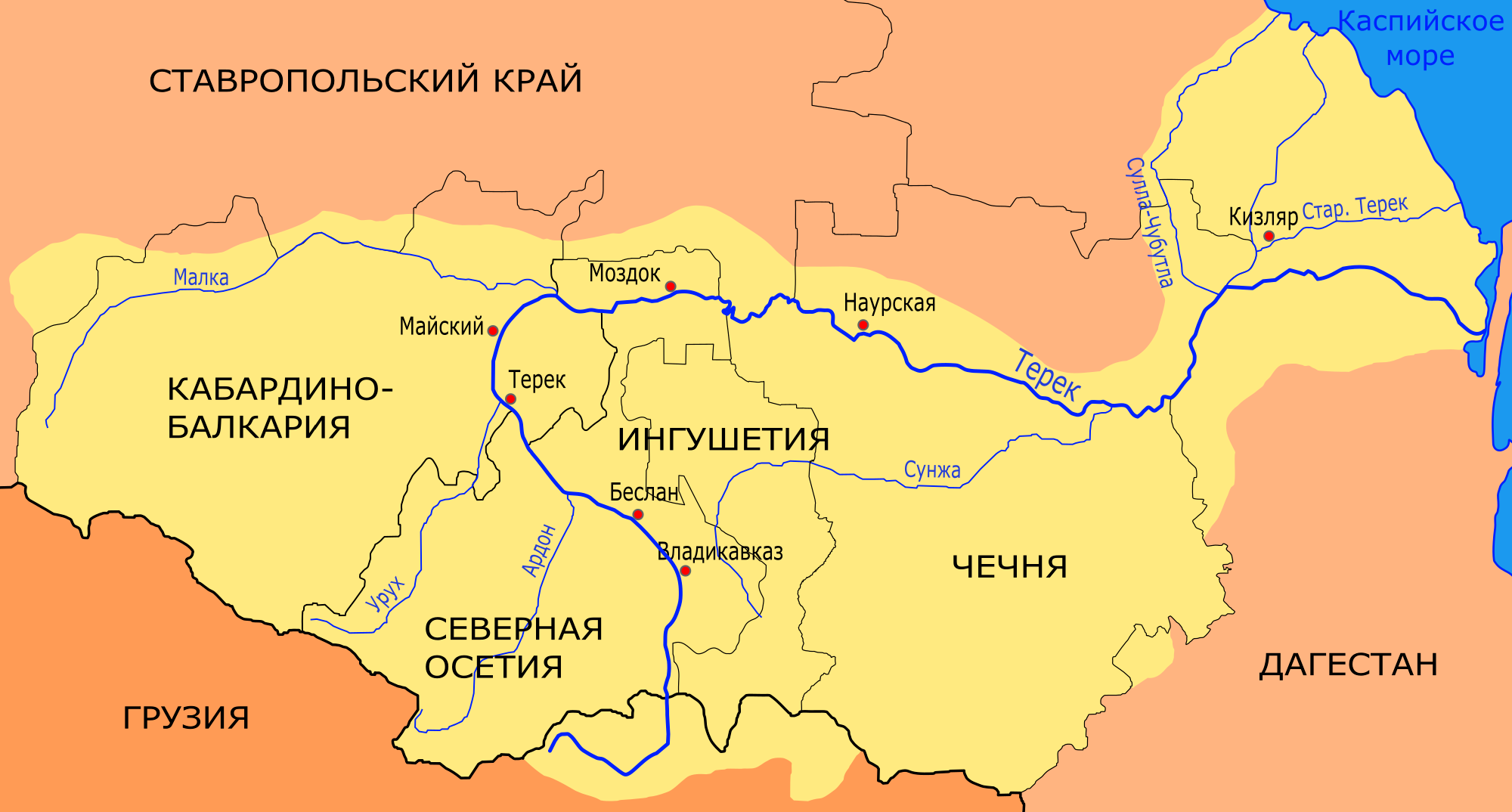
The Sunzha runs from near Vladikavkaz to near the point where the Terek turns north, cutting off the great bend of the Terek

The Sunzha (Russian: Сунжа, IPA: [ˈsunʐə]; Chechen: Соьлжа, romanized: Sölƶa, IPA: [ˈsᶣølʒə]; Ingush: Шолжа, romanized: Şolƶa, IPA: [ˈʃʷɔɫʒə]) is a river in North Ossetia, Ingushetia and Chechnya, Russia, a tributary of the Terek. It flows northeast inside the great northwest bend of the Terek River and catches most of the rivers that flow north from the mountains before they reach the Terek. It is 278 kilometres (173 mi) long, and has a drainage basin of 12,000 square kilometres (4,600 sq mi). The Sunzha rises on the Northern slope of the Caucasus Major. Its major tributaries are the Assa and Argun. With a turbidity of 3,800 grams per cubic metre (6.4 lb/cu yd), it carries 12.2 million tons of alluvium per year. It is used for irrigation. Cities that lie on the Sunzha include Nazran, Karabulak, Grozny (the capital of Chechnya), and Gudermes. During the First and Second Chechen Wars, the destruction of petroleum reservoirs caused the Sunzha to become polluted with petroleum.

== Nomenclature ==
The origin of the name of the river is disputed. The most probable of versions say Sunzha has come from Turco-Mongol languages in the deformed type. It is known that Mongols called it Suinchie, Russians Sevenz and in the Chechen language its name got corrective type Solchzha.

There is also other version that before Sunzha Chechens called the river Okhi «Oh'-hi, Оhhи» that means «downwards the river».

== See also ==
- Valerik (river) – historically notable tributary of Sunzha
