= Mikhail Nikolayevich von Giers =

Russian diplomat (1856–1932)

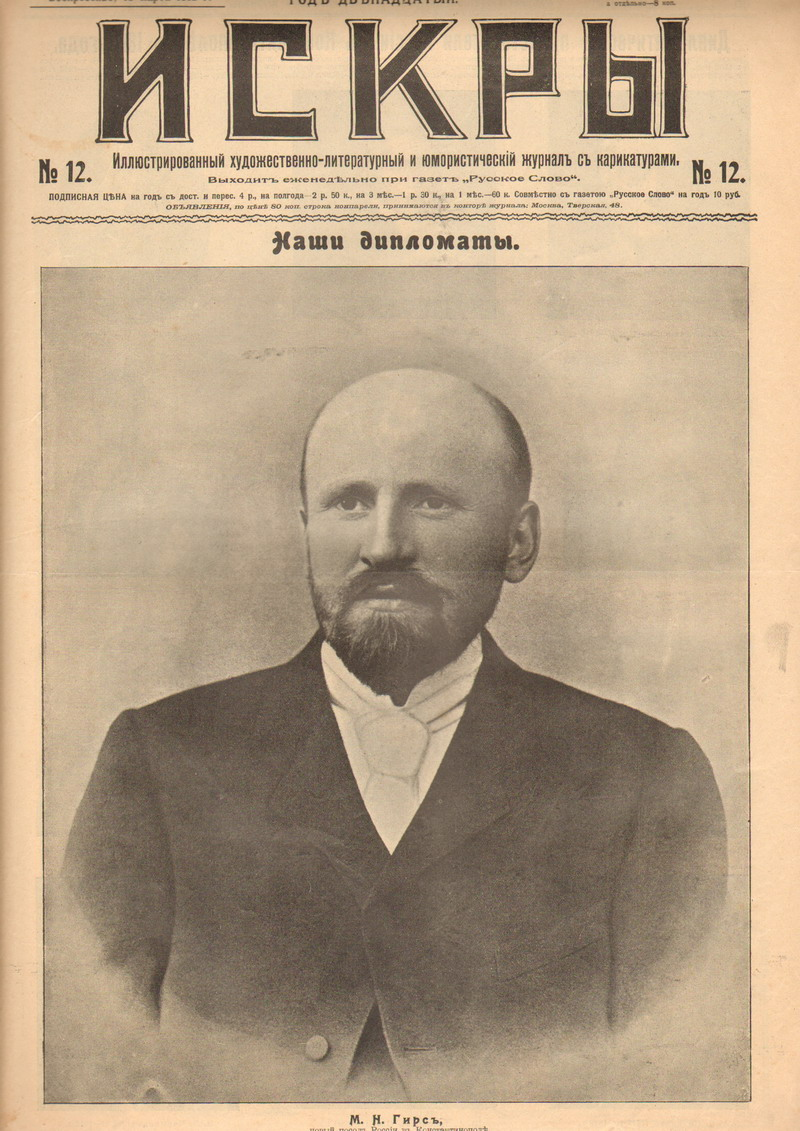
Image of Mikhail Nikolayevich von Giers

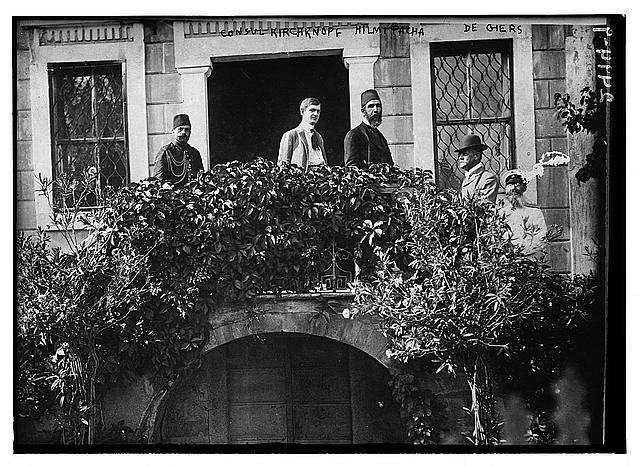
Mikhail Nikolayevich von Giers, second from the right, with diplomats from the Ottoman Empire (Huseyin Hilmi Pasha) and the Austro-Hungarian Empire (Consul Kirchknopf) in 1912

Mikhail Nikolayevich von Giers (Note: Alternatively spelled Mikhail Nikolaevich von Giers or Mikhail Nikolayevich de Giers) (1856–1932) was a Russian diplomat who served as the ambassador to Italy and the Ottoman Empire. He was the son of foreign minister Nikolay Girs.

== Career ==
Giers served as the Imperial Russian ambassador to Romania from 1902 to 1912 before transferring to perform the role in the Ottoman Empire. His conservative approach to diplomacy and abidance to protocol meant he could do little to stem increasing German influence on the Ottoman Porte. In the lead up to the Black Sea Raid, Giers maintained a network of informants in the Ottoman government. Giers was withdrawn from Constantinople on 31 October 1914, shortly before the Russian declaration of war on the Empire. From 1915 to 1917 he was the Russian ambassador to Italy.

He is buried in Batignolles Cemetery in Paris.
