= List of ambassadors of Russia to France =

Ambassador of the Russian Federation to the French Republic
- Emblem of the Russian Foreign Ministry

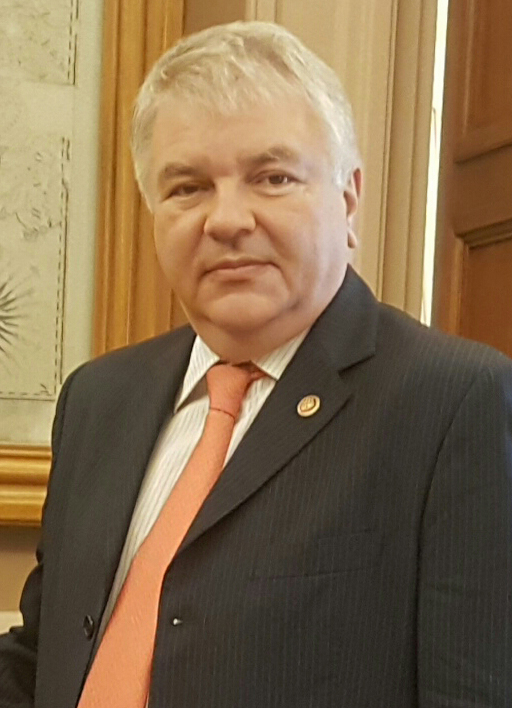
- Incumbent; Alexey Meshkov since 23 October 2017
- Ministry of Foreign Affairs; Embassy of Russia in Paris
- Style: His Excellency; The Honourable
- Reports to: Minister of Foreign Affairs
- Seat: Paris
- Appointer: President of Russia
- Term length: At the pleasure of the president
- Website: Embassy of Russia in France

The ambassador extraordinary and plenipotentiary of the Russian Federation to the French Republic is the official representative of the president and the government of the Russian Federation to the president and the government of France.

The ambassador and his staff work at large in the Embassy of Russia in France. There are consulates general in Strasbourg and Marsailles, an honorary consul in Lyon, and a vice-consulate in Biarritz. The post of Russian ambassador to France is currently held by Alexey Meshkov, incumbent since 23 October 2017. The Russian ambassador to France is concurrently accredited as ambassador to Monaco, where there is an honorary consul general.

== History of diplomatic relations ==
Russian-French contacts began on 9 August 1717, when Hans Christoph Shleynits, the first Russian ambassador to France, was appointed by Tsar Peter I of Russia and presented his credentials to King Louis XV of France. France responded by sending its first ambassador to Russia, Jacques de Campredon, in September 1721. Since then, relations were fairly constant between the two countries, although they were severed and restored many times. Overall, relations between France and Russia have been very close, and French was even considered the unofficial second language of Russia in the 18th and 19th centuries.

Relations between the two countries were severed in 1733 with the start of the War of the Polish Succession and resumed in 1738. Poor relations between the revolutionary government of France and the Russian Monarchy led to relations being severed in 1792. The Napoleonic Wars marked the start of new conflicts between Russia and France, and relations were not restored until the conclusion of the War of the Second Coalition between Russia and France in 1800. The War of the Third Coalition in 1805 led to the disruption of diplomatic relations once again, which were not restored until the signing of the Treaty of Paris on November 20, 1815. Russia and France conflicted over different views on the Revolutions of 1848 and the French support of revolutions in multinational countries. This led to the Crimean War on March 27, 1854, which ended with a Russian defeat on March 30, 1856. Relations between the two countries improved after that, and remained uninterrupted until the October Revolution of 1917.

Diplomatic relations between Russia and France
Russian Empire
August 5, 1717 – Establishment of diplomatic relations
1733 – Diplomatic relations broken off, War of the Polish Succession begins
1738 – Restoration of diplomatic relations, War of the Polish Succession ends
1748 – Diplomatic relations broken off, Treaty of Aix-la-Chapelle ends War of the Austrian Succession
1755 – Restoration of diplomatic relations
1756 - Diplomatic Revolution, alliance for Seven Years' War
1799–1800 – War of the Second Coalition
1800 – Restoration of diplomatic relations
August 28, 1804 – Diplomatic relations broken off, War of the Third Coalition
June 26, 1807 – Restoration of diplomatic relations, Treaty of Tilsit
1812 – Diplomatic relations severed, French invasion of Russia
May 18, 1814 – Restoration of diplomatic relations, Treaty of Paris (1815)
January 23, 1854 – Diplomatic relations severed, Crimean War
March 18, 1856 – Restoration of diplomatic relations, Treaty of Paris (1856)
August 21, 1891 – Franco-Russian Alliance
1904 – Triple Entente formed
Soviet Union
October 26, 1917 – October Revolution, diplomatic relations severed
October 28, 1924 – Diplomatic relations established
May 2, 1935 – Franco-Soviet Treaty of Mutual Assistance
June 30, 1941 – Diplomatic relations severed, Operation Barbarossa
October 23, 1944 – Restoration of diplomatic relations
Russian Federation (Russia)
February 7, 1992 – France recognizes the Russian Federation as successor to the USSR

French Prime Minister Édouard Herriot sent a telegram to Alexey Rykov, the President of the Council of People's Commissars of the USSR, on October 26, 1924, informing him of the French recognition of the establishment of the Soviet Union. When Germany declared war on the Soviet Union on June 30, 1941, the Vichy France government broke off diplomatic relations with the Soviet Union, but never officially entered a state of war. Relations were reestablished on October 23, 1944, with the Soviet recognition of the new Provisional Government of the French Republic. Since then, relations between the new nations remained unbroken, although they were strained at times during the Cold War.

After the breakup of the Soviet Union, relations between France and the new Russian Federation were warm, and France recognized Russia as the successor of the USSR on February 7, 1992.

== List of representatives (1711–present) ==
=== Tsardom of Russia to the Kingdom of France (1711–1721) ===
Name	Image	Title	Appointment	Termination	Notes
Grigory Volkov		Chargé d'affaires	1 July 1711	October 1712	
Ivan Lefort		Chargé d'affaires	1716	1717	
Hans Christoph Shleynits		Envoy	9 August 1717	1720	
Vasily Dolgorukov		Envoy	25 September 1720	2 November 1721	
Source: Diplomats of the Russian Empire- France

=== Russian Empire to the Kingdom of France (1721–1792) ===
Name	Image	Title	Appointment	Termination	Notes
Vasily Dolgorukov		Envoy	2 November 1721	16 March 1722	
Alexander Kurakin		Ambassador	4 May 1722	1724	
Boris Kurakin		Ambassador	4 May 1722	17 October 1727	
Alexander Kurakin		Ambassador	17 October 1727	11 July 1728	
Aleksandr Golovkin		Chief of mission (before 1729); Envoy (after 1729)	1728	1731	
Ernst Johann Graf von Münnich		Chargé d'affaires	July 1731	1733	
Antiokh Kantemir		Envoy (before 11 December 1738); Ambassador (11 December 1738 - 24 September 1742); Envoy (after 24 September 1742)	18 April 1738	31 March 1744	
Aleksey Gross		Chargé d'affaires (before 1745); Envoy (after 1745)	31 March 1744	June 1748	
Fyodor Bekhteyev		Chargé d'affaires	1756	11 July 1757	
Mikhail Bestuzhev-Ryumin		Ambassador	10 August 1756	26 February 1760	
Piotr Chernyshev		Ambassador	4 July 1760	26 July 1762	
Sergei Saltykov		Ambassador	1762	August 1763	
Dmitri Golitsyn		Ambassador	1762	1768	
Nikolai Khotinsky		Chargé d'affaires	1767	1774	
Ivan Baryatinskiy		Ambassador	August 1773	1785	
Ivan Simolin		Ambassador	14 March 1784	7 February 1792	Recalled in 1792; Formally ambassador until his death on 19 September 1799
Source: Diplomats of the Russian Empire- France

=== Russian Empire to the First French Empire (1800–1812) ===
Name	Image	Title	Appointment	Termination	Notes
Georg Magnus Sprengtporten		Special Envoy	1800	1800	
Stepan Kolychyov		Ambassador	1800	1 July 1801	
Arkady Morkov		Ambassador	1 July 1801	26 October 1803	
Pyotr Ubri		Chargé d'affaires	15 November 1803	28 August 1804	
Pyotr Ubri		Special Envoy	2 May 1806	9 July 1806	
Pyotr Tolstoy		Ambassador	31 August 1807	19 October 1808	
Nikolay Rumyantsev		Special Envoy	4 October 1808	2 February 1809	
Grigory Gagarin		Chargé d'affaires	October 1808	November 1808	
Alexander Kurakin		Ambassador	19 October 1808	10 November 1812	
Source: Diplomats of the Russian Empire- France

=== Russian Empire to the Kingdom of France (1814–1852) ===
Name	Image	Title	Appointment	Termination	Notes
Carlo Andrea Pozzo di Borgo		Envoy (before 17 February 1821; Ambassador (after 17 February 1821)	1 April 1814	5 January 1835	
Pavel Medem		Chargé d'affaires	31 January 1835	1835	
Pyotr Palen		Ambassador	11 March 1835	8 April 1851	
Nikolai Kiselyov		Chargé d'affaires (before 8 April 1851); Special Envoy (8 April 1851 - 6 January 1853)	1851	2 December 1852	

=== Russian Empire to the Second French Empire (1852–1870) ===
Name	Image	Title	Appointment	Termination	Notes
Nikolai Kiselyov		Special Envoy (8 April 1851 - 6 January 1853); Envoy (after 6 January 1853)	2 December 1852	13 January 1854	
Philipp von Brunnow		Special Envoy	6 May 1856	29 January 1857	
Pavel Kiselyov		Ambassador	11 July 1856	15 September 1862	
Andrey Budberg		Ambassador	3 November 1862	10 April 1868	
Ernest Stackelberg		Ambassador	25 April 1868	30 April 1870	
Grigory Okunev		Chargé d'affaires	1870	1870	
Philipp von Brunnow		Ambassador (nominal)	21 May 1870	28 November 1870	
Source: Diplomats of the Russian Empire- France

=== Russian Empire to the French Third Republic (1871–1917) ===
Name	Image	Title	Appointment	Termination	Notes
Nikolay Orlov		Ambassador	11 December 1871	8 February 1884	
Arthur von Mohrenheim		Ambassador	8 February 1884	18 November 1897	
Lev Urusov		Ambassador	19 November 1897	1904	
Aleksandr Nelidov		Ambassador	1904	5 September 1910	
Alexander Izvolsky		Ambassador	1910	3 March 1917	
Source: Diplomats of the Russian Empire- France

=== Russian Provisional Government to the French Third Republic (1917) ===
Name	Image	Title	Appointment	Termination	Notes
Alexander Izvolsky		Ambassador	March 1917	1917	
Matvey Sevastopulo		Chargé d'affaires	1917	1917	
Vasily Maklakov		Ambassador	1917	26 October 1917 (unaccredited after the October Revolution)	

=== Soviet Union to the Republic of France (1924–1991) ===
Name	Image	Title	Appointment	Termination	Notes
Leonid Krasin		Plenipotentiary	14 November 1924	30 October 1925	
Christian Rakovsky		Plenipotentiary	30 October 1925	21 October 1927	
Valerian Dovgalevsky		Plenipotentiary	21 October 1927	14 July 1934	
Marcel Rosenberg		Chargé d'affaires	1931	September 1934	
Vladimir Potemkin		Plenipotentiary	25 November 1934	4 April 1937	
Yakov Surits		Plenipotentiary	4 April 1937	29 March 1940	
Aleksandr Bogomolov		Plenipotentiary (before 9 May 1941); Ambassador (after 9 May 1941)	29 March 1940	30 June 1941	
Aleksandr Bogomolov		Representative to the French Committee of National Liberation until 23 October 1944; Ambassador after 23 October 1944	21 September 1943	25 March 1950	
Aleksey Pavlov		Ambassador	25 April 1950	7 July 1953	
Sergey Vinogradov		Ambassador	7 July 1953	24 March 1965	
Valerian Zorin		Ambassador	24 March 1956	18 September 1971	
Peter Abrassimov		Ambassador	18 September 1971	9 April 1973	
Stepan Chervonenko		Ambassador	3 May 1973	20 January 1983	
Yuli Vorontsov		Ambassador	20 January 1983	19 June 1986	
Yakov Ryabov		Ambassador	19 June 1986	23 May 1990	
Yuri Dubinin		Ambassador	23 May 1990	25 December 1991	
Source: Reference History of the Communist Party and the Soviet Union

=== Russian Federation to France (1991–present) ===
Name	Image	Title	Appointment	Termination	Notes
Yuri Ryzhov		Ambassador	4 January 1992	18 December 1998	
Nikolay Afanasevsky		Ambassador	4 January 1992	20 February 2002	
Aleksandr Avdeyev		Ambassador	21 February 2002	16 March 2007	
Alexander Orlov		Ambassador	14 October 2008	23 October 2017	
Alexey Meshkov		Ambassador	23 October 2017		
