= Aleksandr Nelidov =

Russian diplomat

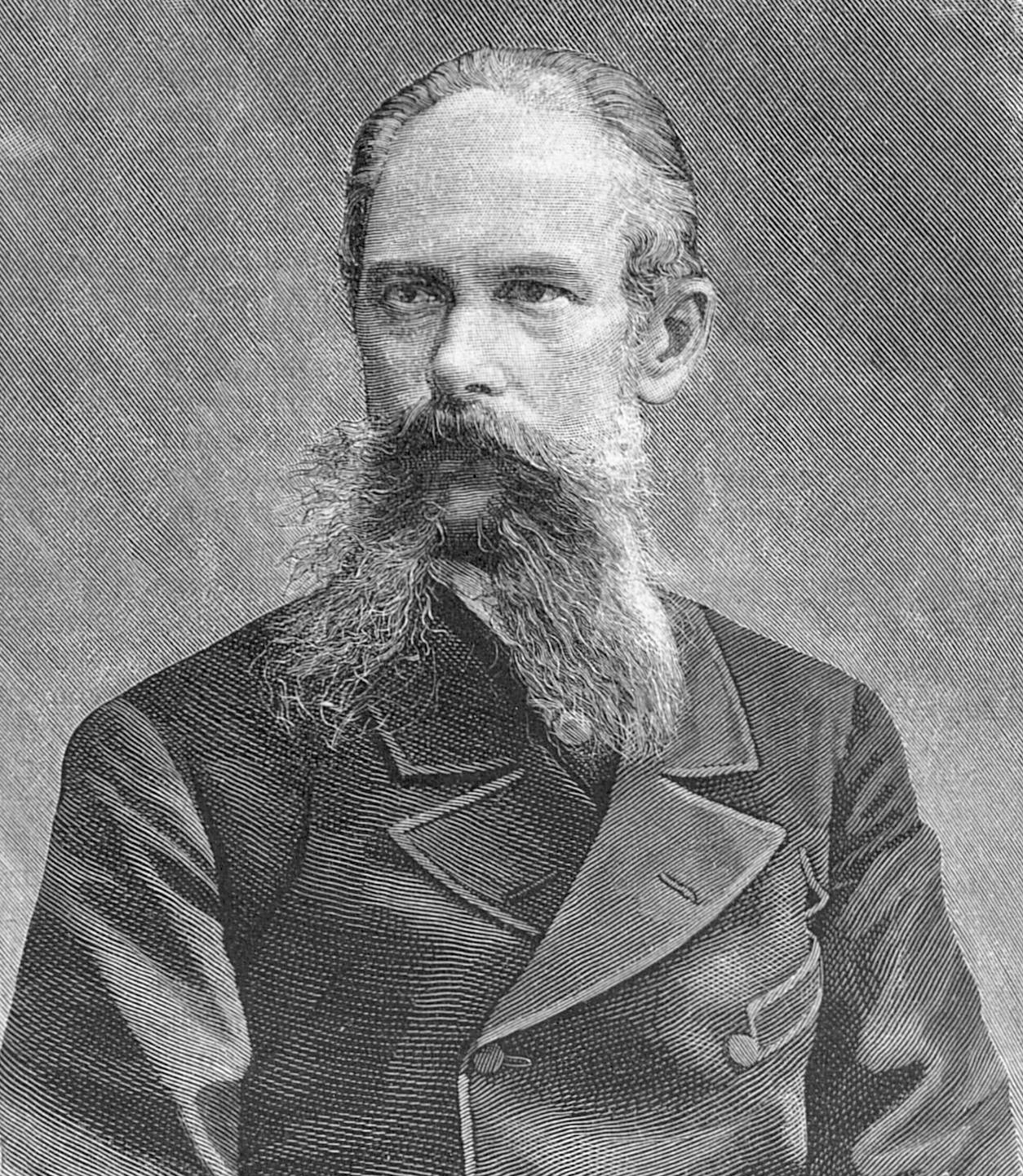
Aleksandr Nelidov

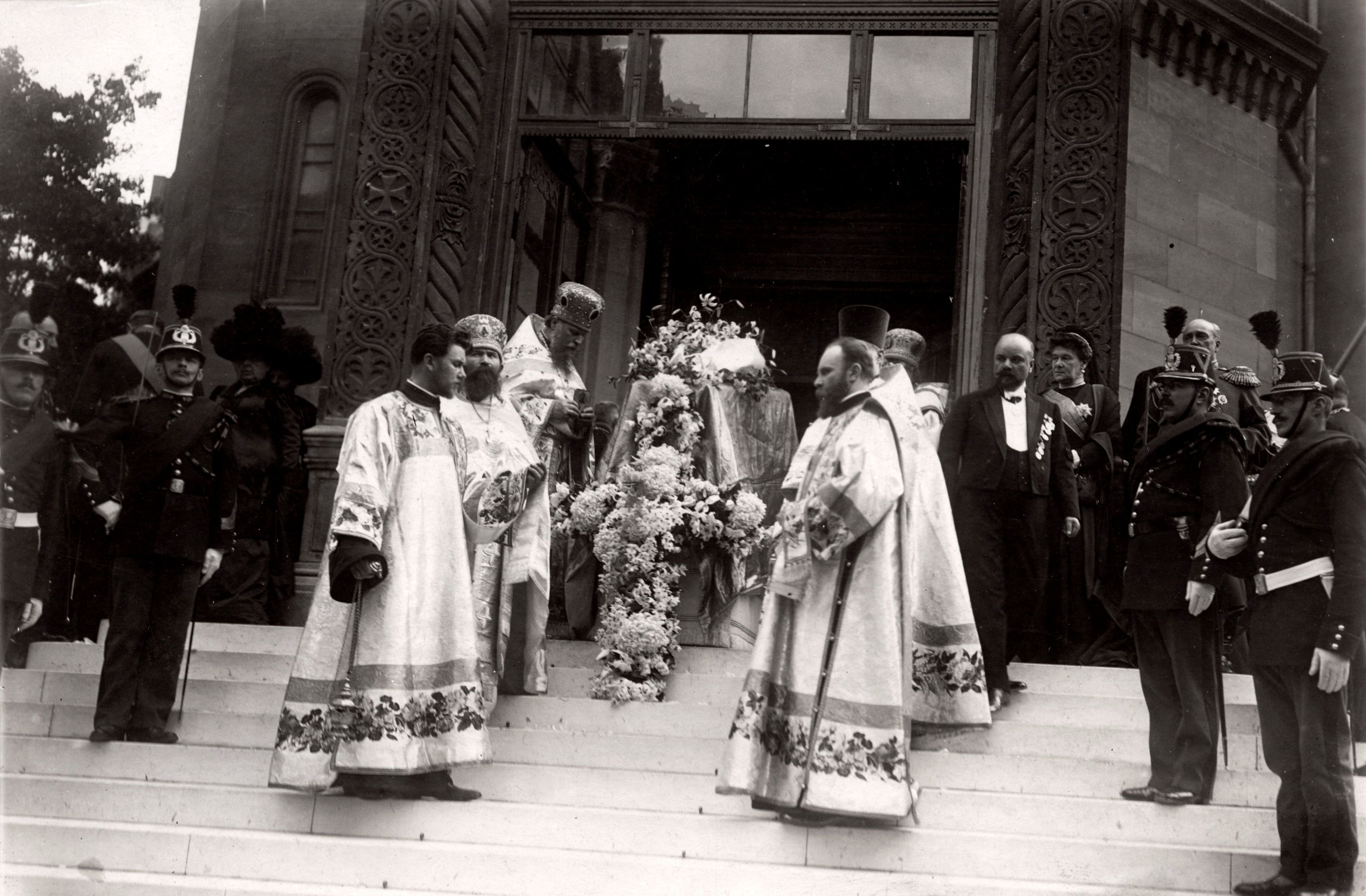
Funeral of Nelidov in Paris (1910)

Aleksandr Ivanovich Nelidov (Russian: Алекса́ндр Ива́нович Нели́дов, 22 June 1838 – 18 September 1910) was a Russian diplomat.

== Early life ==
He was born in Saint Petersburg. He studied law and Oriental languages in St. Petersburg University.

== Career ==
He entered diplomatic service in 1855. He was Secretary to the Russian embassies at Athens, Munich and Vienna.

In 1872 he became Councillor to the Russian embassy in Constantinople. He directed the diplomatic office at the headquarters of the Russian army during the Russo-Turkish War (1877–1878). He was an active part in negotiations that led to the Peace treaty of San Stefano and later the Treaty of Berlin.

He was Ambassador to Saxony in 1879. Nelidov helped settle the Armenian Question and Balkan difficulties. He was Ambassador to Italy (1897–1903) and Ambassador to France (1903–1910).

He presided over the 1907 Hague Peace Conference.

He died from apoplexy on 18 September 1910, which he contracted while passing through Munich on 8 August.
