= Boris Shtein =

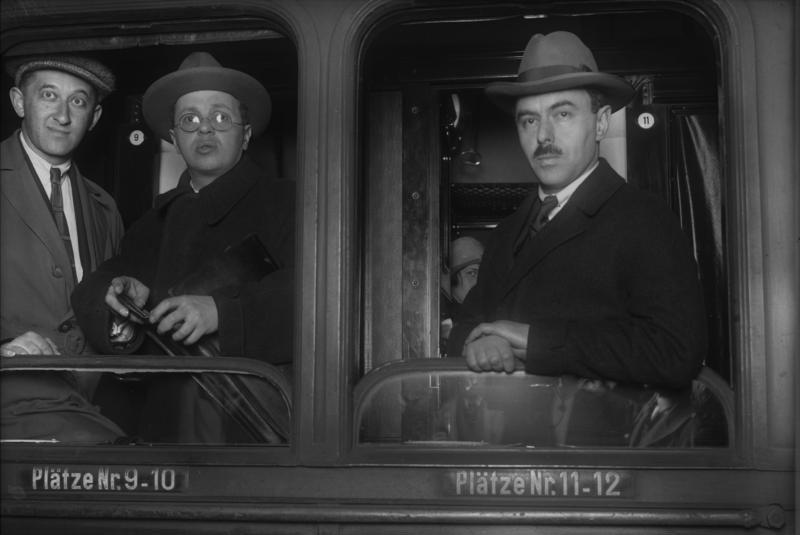
Soviet delegation on the way to the Naval Conference in Geneva in May 1927. On the left Boris Shtein and on the right Grigory Sokolnikov.

Boris Yefimovich Shtein (Russian: Бори́с Ефи́мович Штейн; 1892 – 14 March 1961) was a Soviet diplomat and historian. He was a member of many Soviet delegations in the 1920s and 1930s and served as a diplomat at the United Nations in the 1940s. In later life Shtein dedicated himself to academic work as a professor and writer on the history of Soviet foreign relations. His name is also transliterated as Boris Stein or Boris Shteyn.

== Life ==
Born at Aleksandrovsk in 1892, Shtein graduated in 1917 at the Economic Department of the Petrograd Polytechnical Institute. He was a member of the Menshevik Party from 1919 to 1920 and joined the Russian Communist Party (b) in 1926. From 1920, he worked in the People's Commisariat for Foreign Affairs in many positions such as head of commercial and political offices, assistant head of the economic and legal division, head of wormwood and the Baltic States, head of the department of Central Europe and head of the department of international affairs. From 1932 to 1934, Shtein was ambassador to Finland; he was succeeded by Eric Assmus.

Shtein was the Soviet Ambassador to Italy from 1935 to 1939. From 1945, he was an adviser in the Ministry of Foreign Affairs.

Shtein was a secretary of the Soviet delegation at the Genoa Conference in 1922 and the secretary-general of the Soviet delegation at the Hague Conference in 1927. Also he was the Secretary-General of the Soviet delegation at the International Economic Conference in Geneva between 1928 and 1933. He was the secretary-general of the Soviet delegation to the Preparatory Commission in the World Disarmament Conference.

He was a member of the Soviet delegation at the Assembly of the League of Nations and was later an alternate member of the Soviet delegation at the first and the second sessions of the United Nations General Assembly.

Shtein received a doctorate in historical sciences in 1943. From 1936 to 1938, he was a member of the Central Executive Committee. He was awarded the Order of the Red Banner of Labour and the medal "For valiant work in the Great Patriotic War of 1941–1945".

He died in Moscow on 14 March 1961.
