= List of ambassadors of Russia to Italy =

Diplomatic Representative List

Ambassador of the Russian Federation to the Italian Republic
- Emblem of the Russian Foreign Ministry

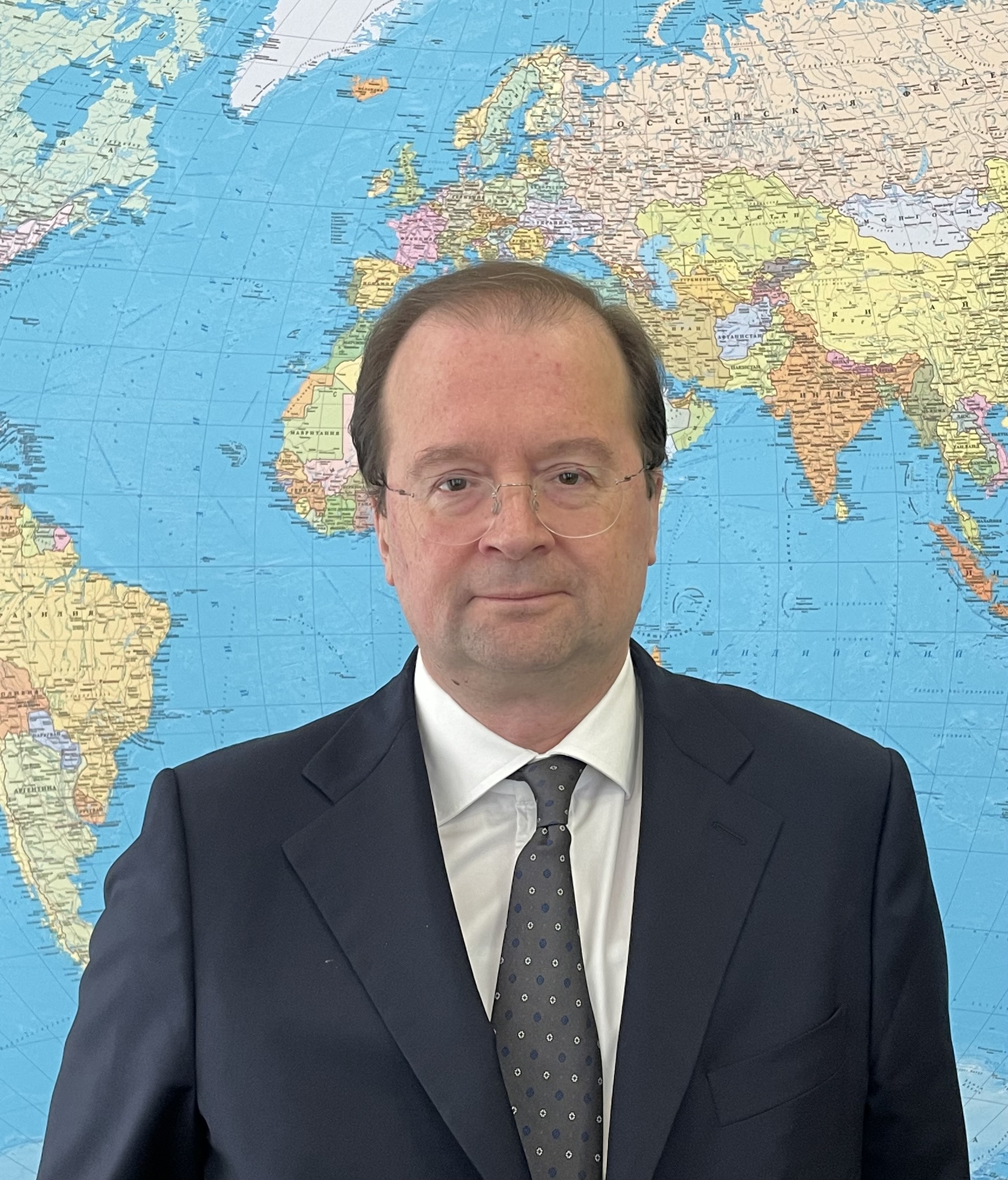
- Incumbent; Aleksey Paramonov since 4 April 2023
- Ministry of Foreign Affairs; Embassy of Russia in Rome
- Style: His Excellency
- Reports to: Minister of Foreign Affairs
- Seat: Rome
- Appointer: President of Russia
- Term length: At the pleasure of the president
- Website: Russian Embassy in Rome

The ambassador extraordinary and plenipotentiary of the Russian Federation to the Italian Republic is the official representative of the president and the government of the Russian Federation to the president and the government of Italy.

The ambassador and his staff work at large in the Embassy of Russia at Via Gaeta, 5- 00185, Rome. There are consulates general in Milan, Palermo, and Genoa, and honorary consulates in Florence, Udine, Ancona, Venice, Verona, Naples, Messina, Pisa and Bari. The post of Russian ambassador to Italy is currently held by Aleksey Paramonov, incumbent since 4 April 2023. The Russian ambassador to Italy is concurrently accredited as the ambassador of Russia to San Marino.

== History of diplomatic relations ==
The first relations between Russia and the predecessor states of modern Italy were established in the late 16th century. In 1862, Russia recognized the Kingdom of Italy and started to send its representatives. In 1876, the missions of the two countries in Saint Petersburg and Rome were transformed into embassies. After the February Revolution, Italy recognized the Russian Provisional Government, and later the Russian Soviet Federative Socialist Republic, de facto from 1921, and de jure from 1924. Diplomatic relations were interrupted on 22 June 1941 by the Axis invasion of the Soviet Union.

== List of representatives (1862–present) ==
=== Russian Empire to the Kingdom of Italy (1862–1917) ===
Name	Title	Appointment	Termination	Notes
Ernst von Stackelberg	Envoy	11 August 1862	3 August 1864	
Nikolai Kiselyov	Envoy	3 August 1864	23 November 1869	
Karl Ikskul von Gildenband	Envoy (before 1 July 1876); Ambassador (after 1 July 1876)	13 December 1869	12 March 1891	
Aleksandr Vangali	Ambassador	12 March 1891	8 June 1897	
Aleksandr Nelidov	Ambassador	1 July 1897	1904	
Lev Urusov	Ambassador	1904	1905	
Nikolay Muraviev	Ambassador	14 January 1905	1 December 1908	
Nikolai Dolgorukov	Ambassador	1909	1912	
Anatoly Krupensky	Ambassador	1912	1915	
Mikhail Girs	Ambassador	March 1915	2 March 1917	

=== Russian Provisional Government to the Kingdom of Italy (1917) ===
Name	Title	Appointment	Termination	Notes
Mikhail Girs	Ambassador	24 March 1917	26 October 1917	

=== Russian Soviet Federative Socialist Republic to the Kingdom of Italy (1921–1923) ===
Name	Title	Appointment	Termination	Notes
Vatslav Vorovsky	Diplomatic representative	14 March 1921	10 May 1923	

=== Union of Soviet Socialist Republics to the Kingdom of Italy (1923–1946) ===
Name	Title	Appointment	Termination	Notes
Nikolai Iordansky	Diplomatic representative	23 July 1923	7 March 1924	
Konstantin Yurenev	Plenipotentiary	7 March 1924	4 April 1925	
Platon Kerzhentsev	Plenipotentiary	4 April 1925	26 November 1926	
Lev Kamenev	Plenipotentiary	26 November 1926	7 January 1928	
Dmitry Kursky	Plenipotentiary	28 January 1928	26 September 1932	
Vladimir Potemkin	Plenipotentiary	26 September 1932	25 November 1934	
Boris Shtein	Plenipotentiary	25 November 1934	7 October 1939	
Nikolai Gorelkin	Plenipotentiary (before 9 May 1941); Ambassador (after 9 May 1941)	8 October 1939	22 June 1941	
Second World War - Diplomatic relations interrupted (1941 - 1944)
Mikhail Kostylyov	Diplomatic representative (before 1 April 1945); Ambassador (after 1 April 1945)	20 March 1944	2 June 1946	

=== Union of Soviet Socialist Republics to the Republic of Italy (1946–1991) ===
Name	Title	Appointment	Termination	Notes
Mikhail Kostylyov	Ambassador	2 June 1946	9 February 1954	
Aleksandr Bogomolov	Ambassador	9 February 1954	2 March 1957	
Semyon Kozyrev	Ambassador	2 March 1957	21 May 1966	
Nikita Ryzhov	Ambassador	21 May 1966	21 February 1980	
Valentin Oberemko	Ambassador	21 February 1980	2 July 1980	
Nikolai Lunkov	Ambassador	19 November 1980	12 April 1990	
Anatoly Adamishin	Ambassador	12 April 1990	25 December 1991	

=== Russian Federation to the Republic of Italy (1991–present) ===
Name	Title	Appointment	Termination	Notes
Anatoly Adamishin	Ambassador	25 December 1991	24 December 1992	
Valery Kenyakin	Ambassador	11 December 1993	9 October 1997	
Nikolai Spassky	Ambassador	14 November 1997	16 December 2003	
Aleksey Meshkov	Ambassador	20 January 2004	14 December 2012	
Sergey Razov	Ambassador	6 May 2013	4 April 2023	
Aleksey Paramonov	Ambassador	4 April 2023		

== See also ==
- Embassy of Italy in Moscow
- Foreign relations of Italy
- Foreign relations of Russia
- List of diplomatic missions of Russia
