= Apollon Galafeyev =

Russian general

Apollon Vasilyevich Galafeyev (Russian: Аполлон Васильевич Галафеев) (1793–1853) was a decorated Russian general.

Apollon Galafeyev was born into a noble family in Tambov guberniya. After having received his education at the 1st Cadet Corps, he graduated in the rank of podporuchik on December 26, 1811, and was assigned to the Tula Infantry Regiment. In 1812, Apollon Galafeyev served in Count Peter Wittgenstein’s unit and took part in the Battle of Sivoshino, Battle of Svolnya, First and Second Battle of Polotsk (promoted to poruchik and awarded the Order of St. Anna, 4th Class), Battle of Czasniki, and Battle of Smolyanka (promoted to staff captain). In 1813, Apollon Galafeyev participated in the siege of Pillau and the Free City of Danzig, the blockade of Wittenberg, Battle of Luckau (promoted to captain), Battle of Leipzig, capturing of Amsterdam and repelling of the enemy from Breda. In 1814, Apollon Galafeyev took part in the blockade of Jülich, Battle of Craonne, Battle of Laon, and occupation of Paris.

On April 23, 1817, Apollon Galafeyev was promoted to the rank of major and then lieutenant colonel (September 15, 1819). On December 8, 1820, he was transferred to the Velikolutsky Infantry Regiment. On December 12, 1823, Galafeyev was appointed commander of the 20th Jaeger Regiment. On January 28, 1828, he was promoted to the rank of colonel and then sent to the Russo-Turkish War. For his performance in several battles, Apollon Galafeyev was awarded the Order of St. Vladimir (4th class), Order of St. Anna (2nd class), a gold sabre inscribed "For Bravery", and another Order of Saint Anna with diamonds. Besides this, Galafeyev took part in the siege of Shumla and Varna. On October 23, 1829, he was also awarded the Order of St. George (4th class). In 1831, Apollon Galafeyev participated in the Russo-Polish War, mainly fighting against the units of Brigadier Józef Dwernicki and General Samuel Różycki. For his service in Poland, he was awarded the Order of Saint Vladimir (3rd class), promoted to the rank of major general (December 6), and assigned to the commander-in-chief of the 1st Army. On August 19, 1833, Apollon Galafeyev was awarded the Order of Saint Stanislaus (1st class) and then Order of Saint Anna (1st class) a year later. On October 19, 1834, he was appointed chief-of-staff of a detached Siberian Corps. On December 6, 1838, Galafeyev was appointed commander of the 20th Infantry Division.

Also, Apollon Galafeyev participated in the Caucasian War of 1817-1864. As infantry commander, he took part in Adjutant General Pavel Grabbe’s Dagestan campaign against Imam Shamil from April to September 1839. Galafeyev was awarded the imperial crown to his Order of Saint Anna (1st class) for defeating Tashev-hadji (Shamil’s associate) and Order of Saint Vladimir (2nd class) with a promotion to lieutenant general for capturing Shamil’s mountain stronghold of Akhoulgo. From March to December 1840, Apollon Galafeyev participated in a military campaign against the mountaineers, commanding the so-called Chechen unit. On July 11, the famous Battle of the Valerik River took place, in which Mikhail Lermontov took part (later he would describe this event in his poem called "The Valerik"). In October 1841, Galafeyev participated in military action in the Chechen unit under the command of Pavel Grabbe and was wounded in upper abdomen with a rifle bullet. On September 7, 1842, he was shell-shocked in his right shoulder by a cannonball.

On November 3, 1844, Apollon Galafeyev was appointed governor of Sevastopol, but had to remain in the Caucasus due to his illness until 1846. On October 1, 1852, he was removed from his post and court-martialed for administrative abuses. On December 15, 1853, Apollon Galafeyev was dismissed from military service. He died later that same year.
