= Battle of the Valerik River =

Battle during the Caucasian War

- Part of the Murid War during the Caucasian War
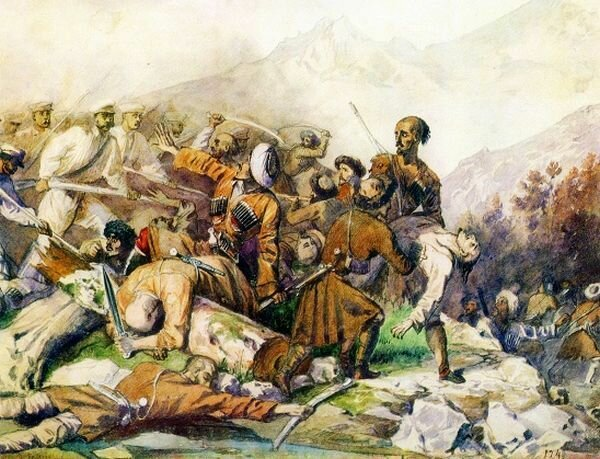
- Battle of the River Valerik by Mikhail Lermontov
Date	11–23 July 1840
Location	Chekhinsky Forest, 30km southwest of Grozny 43°10′10″N 45°24′32″E
Result	Russian victory

Belligerents
(Russia) Russian Empire	Caucasian Imamate

Commanders and leaders
(Russia) Apollon Galafeyev (Russia) Alexander Pullo (Russia) Mikhail Lermontov	Ahberdila Muhammad; Isa of Gendergen

Strength
6 battalions 14 guns 1500 Cossacks	~6,000

Casualties and losses
~66 killed 265 wounded and shell-shocked 8 missing ~1,400 soldiers and 45 officers according to De la Chapelle	Unknown; ~150 left on the battlefield ~600 left on the battlefield according to Lermontov

The Battle of the Valerik River on 11 July 1840 was fought as part of the Russian conquest of the Caucasus. It occurred about 30 km (19 miles) southwest of the fortress of Groznaya (now Grozny) between forces of the Imperial Russian Army and North Caucasian mountaineers led by the naib (viceroy) Ahberdila Muhammad. It remains famous because of the poem "Valerik" by Mikhail Lermontov, a participant.

== Situation in the eastern Caucasus on the eve of the battle ==
An attempt to disarm the population of Chechnya in the spring of 1840 had caused unrest which grew into open rebellion against the Russian authorities. The Caucasus resistance leader, Imam Shamil, took this opportunity to appoint Ahberdila Muhammad as naib (governor) of Lesser Chechnya and call for a general uprising of the Karabulaks, Galashians, the Sunzha and Nadterechny Chechens, Nazrans and Ghalghaï. The Russian authorities felt compelled to organize a military expedition against the rebels. The Russian writer M. Lermontov also participated in the battle.

Movements of the Galafeyev detachment 6–14 July 1840

On 6 July the Galafeyev detachment set out from the Groznaya fortress and began destroying the fields and villages to the south and southwest of the fortress, as the inhabitants fled. The rebels did not resist directly, but engaged in constant harassing actions which afflicted the Russians and caused losses.

The detachment's line of march led toward the village of Achkhoy, the road to which passed through the Chekhinsky Forest and crossed the Valerik River. The rebels apparently anticipated the Russian movement and for three days fortified the banks of the Valerik with abatis and debris. On 11 July the Galafeyev detachment decamped from the village of Gekhi and moved toward the Valerik.

== Opposing forces ==
=== The Russians ===
Composition and size of the detachment of Lieutenant General A. Galafeyev
Vanguard (Colonel Beloselsky-Belozersky)
800 Don Cossacks*; Two horse guns
Vanguard of the main forces (Colonel R. K. Freitag )
Three battalions of the Kurinsky Jaeger Regiment, Two companies of sappers (Captain Gernet); 100 Don Cossacks*; 100 Mozdok Cossacks; Four guns
Main force (Captain Grekulov)
One battalion of the Mingrelian Jaeger Regiment; Four guns baggage train
Reserve (Colonel A. E. Wrangell)
Two battalions of HSH Prince of Warsaw Count Paskiewich Erivan Regiment; 100 Don Cossacks*; Four guns
Total strength of the detachment:	2,000 infantry 1,400 cavalry 14 guns
* = 37th and 39th Regiments of the Don

=== The Chechens ===
Lermontov, in a letter to Barbara Lopukhin and later in his poem "Valerik", evaluated the strength of the enemy at 6,000 to 7,000 fighters. Given that in the area of Lesser Chechnya under the leadership of Ahberdila Muhammad, there were 5,700 families, and that an unprecedented effort was being made on the part of the rebels; assuming about one fighter from each family, the number 6,000 does not seem too high.

== Course of the battle ==
Passing through the Chekhinsky Forest toward the Valerik, the Russian column stretched along a narrow forest road. The approaches to the river saw the first clash as the rebels fired on the column from the forest undergrowth. The Russian advance guard, however, quickly chased off the enemy and the column's battle order was restored.

Soon a Russian detachment reached the Valerik. The river at this point intersects the road the Russians were using almost perpendicularly, and in normal conditions is easily fordable. The bank on the Russian side is an open beach, but the opposite bank is steep and wooded. On both sides of the road the rebels had cut down trees to create a clear field of fire about the length of a musket shot.

Approaching the river to within canister range, the Russian gunners fired a volley into the thicket on the opposite shore, but no reaction was seen.

The vanguard of the infantry battalions were preparing to cross the river and occupy the forest on both sides of the road, to facilitate the passage of the baggage train and other units. Parts of the main body were deployed in their support. At this point, the rebels began to fire on the Russians from across the river.

The battalions of the Kurinsky Regiment, with combat engineers, rushed forward on both sides of the road and crossed the river, where on the opposite side was a rebel fortified blockhouse of logs, and engaged the enemy in a bayonet fight in the forest thicket. The rebels broke before the onslaught and started to retreat, but many of them, cut off from their own people, ran out of the woods near the river where they came under Russian artillery fire from the opposite bank, which drove them back into the woods.

Separate groups of rebels cut off from the main forces attempted to attack the convoy and the headquarters of General Galafeyev, but were everywhere repulsed. Skirmishes continued for some time in the forest near the abatis, which the rebels defended particularly tenaciously, but by six o'clock the battle began to subside and the engineers, withdrawn from the forest, began to assist the convoy in crossing the Valerik.

=== Casualties ===
According to the action report of the Galafeyev detachment, the unit's losses were:

- Killed: One officer, 65 lower ranks
- Wounded: Two staff officers, 15 other officers, 198 lower ranks
- Shell-shocked: Four officers, 46 lower ranks
- Missing: One officer, seven lower ranks

29 Russian horses were killed and 42 injured.

The rebels were reported to have left 150 dead on the battlefield. although Lermontov stated in a letter that 600 bodies were left by the rebels. According to the reports of spies, Ahberdila Muhammad was shot in the leg.

== Results and implications ==
After crossing the Valerik, the Galafeyev detachment moved to Achkhoy, meeting no further serious resistance. Some minor clashes and skirmishes continued.

Local residents said that the rebels had been sure that the Russians would not be able to cross the Valerik, so at Achkhoy and other nearby villages the residents did not leave until the Russians actually arrived. Here the Galafeyev detachment was met by troops under Major General Ivan Labyntsev who had been performing similar operations in Eastern Chechnya. On 14 July the Galafeyev detachment returned to Groznaya.

However the reports by the French ambassador de La Chapelle in Tbilisi the losses of the Tsarist forces were much greater than what they admitted. In 2021 several French reports and letters from the 1839-1844's were released. Among them were the letters and reports from the French ambassador De la Chapelle living in Tbilisi, Georgia. According to him the Tsarist forces lost up to 1400 soldiers and 45 officers in the battle at Valerik river. These losses were so great that Galafeyev and the Tsarist forces had to retreat early in haste to the Grozny fortress. De la Chapelle also noted that the Chechens were hardly subdued.

The Highlanders may be destroyed but they, more than for sure, never submit.

— De la Chapelle

== Lermontov's role and poem ==
Mikhail Lermontov, a lieutenant in the Tenginsky Regiment, showed exemplary valor in the battle. The official battle report stated:

This officer [Lermontov], disregarding any danger, fulfilled his duties with outstanding courage and composure, and was with the first rank of the bravest soldiers assaulting the enemy's entrenchments.

For this, Lermontov was awarded the Order of St. Vladimir Fourth Class, but he never received the award as his name was removed from the final list of recipients by Czar Nicholas I, who harbored a strong dislike for the contumacious poet.

Lermontov's poem "Valerik" was first published (with omissions) in 1843 in the anthology Dawn. Although the poem contains battle scenes both stirring and grisly (which correlate in great detail to the official action report), the poem ultimately views war as a senseless slaughter, and he and the fighters (on both sides) as "beasts" violating the beautiful world of his beloved pristine Caucasus.

Lermontov also made several drawings depicting scenes of the battle.

== Bibliography ==
- Kulikov, Anatoliy; Runov, Valentin (2013). Все Кавказские войны России: полная энциклопедия [All the Caucasian wars of Russia: a complete encyclopedia] (in Russian). Moscow: Яуза. ISBN 978-5-699-67338-4.
- Baddeley, John (1908). The Russian Conquest of Caucasus. London.
- Хожаев, Д. А. (1998). Чеченцы в Русско-Кавказской войне (in Russian). Грозный-Санкт-Петербург: «Седа». pp. 1–250. ISBN 5-85973-012-8. Archived from the original on 2014-12-22.
- Egorshina, O.; Petrova, A. (2023). История русской армии [The history of the Russian Army] (in Russian). Moscow: Edition of the Russian Imperial Library. ISBN 978-5-699-42397-2.
- Vinogradov, B. S. (1981). "Чечня" [Chechnya]. Лермонтовская энциклопедия [Lermontov Encyclopedia]. Moscow: Soviet Encyclopedia. pp. 615–616. (in Russian)
- Lebedinets, G. S. (1891). "Михаил Юрьевич Лермонтов в битвах с черкесами в 1840 году" [Mikhail Lermontov in battles with the Circassians in 1840]. Русская старина [Russian Antiquity]. Vol. 7. (in Russian)
- Malkov, S. M. (1981). "Военная служба" [Military Service]. Лермонтовская энциклопедия [Lermontov Encyclopedia]. Moscow: Soviet Encyclopedia. pp. 87–90. (in Russian)
- Rakovic, D. (1900). Тенгинский полк на Кавказе 1819 — 1846 [The Tenginsky Regiment in the Caucasus 1819 — 1846]. Tbilisi. (in Russian)
