= Burials at the Novodevichy Cemetery =

Coordinates: 55°43′29″N 37°33′16″E

== Notable burials: A–C ==
- Yevgeniy Abalakov (1907–1948), mountaineer and sculptor
- Alexei Abrikosov (1875–1955), physician and pathologist
- Andrei Abrikosov (1906–1973), actor
- Grigori Abrikosov (1932–1993), actor
- Sergey Afanasyev (1918–2001), first Soviet space industry minister
- Ivan Agayants (1911–1968), KGB officer and foreign spy
- Sergei Aksakov (1791–1859), writer
- Vsevolod Aksyonov (1902–1960), actor
- Karo Alabyan (1897–1959), architect
- Alexander Alexandrov (1883–1946), founder of the Alexandrov Ensemble
- Boris Alexandrov (1905–1994), leader of the Alexandrov Ensemble
- Abraham Alikhanov, (1904–1970), physicist
- Nadezhda Alliluyeva (1901–1932), wife of Joseph Stalin
- Daniil Andreev (1906–1959), writer
- Averky Aristov (1903–1973), politician and diplomat
- Coretti Arle-Titz (1883-1951), singer and actress
- Vladimir Arnold (1937–2010), mathematician
- Vasily Azhayev (1915–1968), writer
- Nikolai Basistiy (1898–1971), naval admiral
- Pavel Batov (1897–1985), army general
- Demyan Bedny (1883–1945), writer
- Andrei Bely (1880–1934), writer
- Pavel Belyayev (1925–1970), cosmonaut
- Georgi Beregovoi (1921–1995), cosmonaut
- Mark Bernes (1911–1969), actor and singer
- Aleksandr Blagonravov (1906–1962), military engineer
- Maria Blumenthal-Tamarina (1859–1938), actress
- Vladimir Bonch-Bruevich (1873–1955), writer
- Sergei Bondarchuk (1920–1994), actor and director
- Artyom Borovik (1960–2000), journalist and businessman
- Mikhail Botvinnik (1911–1995), chess champion
- Valeriy Brumel (1942–2003), athlete champion
- Valery Bryusov (1873–1924), writer
- Serafima Bryusova (1894–1958), first female neurosurgeon
- Mikhail Bulgakov (1881–1940), playwright and author
- Nikolai Bulganin (1895–1975), Marshal of the Soviet Union and Premier of the Soviet Union
- Nikolai Burdenko (1876–1946), neurosurgeon
- Rolan Bykov (1929–1998), actor
- Feodor Chaliapin (1873–1938), opera singer
- Anton Chekhov (1860–1904), writer
- Vladimir Chelomei (1914–1984), rocket engineer
- Pavel Cherenkov (1904–1990), Nobel laureate in Physics
- Ivan Chernyakhovsky (1906–1945), General of the Army
- Georgi Chicherin (1872–1936), statesman
- Inna Churikova (1943-2023), Actress

== Notable burials: D–G ==
- Yakov Dashevsky (1902–1972), army general
- Kuzma Derevyanko (1904–1954), army general
- Alexander Deyneka (1899–1969), painter and sculptor
- Lev Dovator (1903–1941), army general
- Nikolai Dudorov (1906–1977), Soviet politician and civil servant
- Isaak Dunayevsky (1900–1955), composer and conductor
- Ilya Ehrenburg (1891–1967), writer
- G. El-Registan (1899–1945), poet
- Sergei Eisenstein (1898–1948), film director
- Ivan Fadeev (1906–1976), long-term finance minister
- Alexander Fadeyev (1901–1956), writer
- Klavdia Fomicheva, (1917–1958), WWII pilot and Hero of the Soviet Union
- Dmitri Furmanov (1891–1926), writer
- Ekaterina Furtseva (1910–1974), politician
- Shakir Geniatullin (1895–1946), army general
- Sergei Gerasimov (1906–1985), film director
- Emil Gilels (1916-1985), pianist
- Vitaly Ginzburg (1916-2009), Nobel laureate in Physics
- Reinhold Glière (1875–1956), composer
- Valentin Glushko (1908–1989), spacecraft and rockets designer
- Nikolai Gogol (1809–1852), writer
- Mikhail Gorbachev (1931–2022), Last Leader of the Soviet Union and former President of the Soviet Union
- Raisa Gorbacheva (1932–1999), former "First Lady" of the Soviet Union and wife of Mikhail Gorbachev
- Ivan Gren (1898–1960), vice-admiral
- Andrei Gromyko (1909–1989), politician and head of state of the Soviet Union
- Lyudmila Gurchenko (1935–2011), popular actress, singer and entertainer

== Notable burials: H–K ==
- Nazim Hikmet (1901–1963), Turkish poet
- Dmitri Hvorostovsky (1962–2017), opera singer
- Ilya Ilf (1897–1937), writer
- Sergey Ilyushin (1894–1977), aeroplanes designer
- Archie Johnstone (1896-1963), journalist
- Dmitri Kabalevsky (1904–1987), composer
- Lazar Kaganovich (1893–1991), last of the Old Bolsheviks
- Nikolay Kamov (1902–1973), helicopters designer
- Leonid Kantorovich (1912–1986), Nobel Prize–winning economist
- Lev Kassil (1905–1970), writer
- Valentin Kataev (1897–1986), writer
- Anatoly Kharlampiyev (1906–1979), founder of sambo
- Velimir Khlebnikov (1885–1922), poet
- Nikita Khrushchev (1894–1971), Leader of the Soviet Union (1953–1964)
- Sergei Khrushchev (1935–2020), engineer and academic, son of Nikita Khrushchev
- Igor Kio (1944–2006), illusionist
- Vladimir Kokkinaki (1904–1985), distinguished Soviet test pilot
- Andrey Kolmogorov (1903–1987), eminent mathematician
- Boris Korolev (1885–1963), avant-garde sculptor
- Olga Knipper (1868–1959), actress
- Rustam Khan Khoyski (1888–1948), Minister of Social Security of Azerbaijan Democratic Republic
- Leonid Kogan (1924–1982), violin virtuoso
- Alexandra Kollontai (1872–1952), politician
- Pavel Korin (1892–1967), painter and art restorer
- Zoya Kosmodemyanskaya (1923–1941), partisan and Heroine of the Soviet Union
- Pyotr Koshevoy (1904–1976), Marshal of the Soviet Union
- Gleb Kotelnikov (1872–1944), the knapsack parachute inventor
- Ivan Kozhedub (1920–1991), air force general
- Ivan Kozlovsky (1900–1993), opera singer
- Ernst Krenkel (1903–1971), explorer and radio operator
- Masha and Dasha Krivoshlyapova (1950–2003), ischiopagus tripus conjoined twins
- Peter Kropotkin (1842–1921), Russia's foremost anarchist
- Lev Kuleshov (1899–1970), film theorist and director
- Vladimir Krinsky (1890–1971), artist and architect

== Notable burials: L–O ==
- Lev Landau (1908–1968), Nobel laureate in Physics
- Alexander Lebed (1950–2002), army general and politician
- Sergei Lebedev (1902–1974), computer pioneer
- Vasily Lebedev-Kumach (1898–1949), poet and singer
- Pavel Lebedev-Polianskii (1881–1948), director of Glavlit
- Valery Legasov (1936–1988), Hero of the Russian Federation, chief of commission that investigated 1986 Chernobyl disaster
- Sergei Lemeshev (1902–1977), opera singer
- Yevgeny Leonov (1926–1994), actor
- Isaac Levitan (1860–1900), painter
- Yuri Levitan (1914–1983), radio announcer
- Maxim Litvinov (1876–1951), politician
- Matvey Manizer (1891–1966), Socialist realist sculptor
- Alexei Maresiev (1916–2001), flying ace
- Samuil Marshak (1887–1964), writer, translator and children's poet
- Ekaterina Maximova (1939–2009), prima ballerina
- Vladimir Mayakovsky (1893–1930), poet
- Victor Merzhanov (1919–2012), pianist
- Anastas Mikoyan (1895–1978), politician and head of state of the Soviet Union
- Vyacheslav Molotov (1890–1986), politician and former premier
- Kirill Moskalenko (1902–1985), former commander of Strategic Rocket Forces
- Vera Mukhina (1889–1953), sculptor
- Alexander Nadiradze (1914–1987), missile/weapon engineer and designer
- Vladimir Nemirovich-Danchenko (1858–1943), theater director
- Grigory Nikulin (1895–1965), Bolshevik revolutionary and chekist
- Yuri Nikulin (1921–1997), clown and actor
- Alexander Novikov (1900–1976), Air Force Marshal
- Sergey Obraztsov (1901–1992), puppeteer
- Vladimir Obruchev (1863–1956), geologist, geographer and explorer
- Nikolay Ogarev (1813–1877), writer
- Nikolay Ogarkov (1917–1994), Marshal and Chief of the Soviet General Staff (1977–1984)
- David Oistrakh (1908–1974), violin virtuoso
- Aleksandr Oparin (1894–1980), scientist
- Lyubov Orlova (1902–1975), actress
- Nikolai Ostrovsky (1904–1936), writer
- Arkady Ostrovsky (1914-1967), composer

== Notable burials: P–R ==
- Ivan Panfilov (1892–1941), army general
- Anatoli Papanov (1922–1987), actor
- Valentin Parnakh (1891–1951), poet and jazz musician
- Vera Pashennaya (1887–1962), actress of theater and cinema
- Lyudmila Pavlichenko (1916–1974), female sniper
- Ivan Petrov (1896–1958), army general
- Ivan Petrovsky (1901–1973), mathematician
- Nikolai Podgorny (1903–1983), politician and head of state of the Soviet Union
- Aleksandr Ivanovich Pokryshkin (1913–1985), Air Force marshal
- Boris Polevoy (1908–1981), writer
- Nikolai Nikolaevich Polikarpov (1892–1944), aircraft constructor
- Vitaly Popkov (1922–2010), pilot
- Pyotr Pospelov (1898–1971), high-ranked Communist Party functionary
- Sergei Prokofiev (1891–1953), composer
- Aleksandr Ptushko (1900–1973), film director
- Vyacheslav Ragozin (1908–1962), chessplayer
- Arkady Raikin (1911–1987), stand up comedian
- Irina Rakobolskaya (1919–2016), chief of staff all-female 46th Guards Night Bomber Regiment in WWII; physicist
- Aleksandr Razumny (1891–1972), film director
- Sviatoslav Richter (1915–1997), pianist
- George de Roerich (1902–1960), tibetologist
- Mikhail Romm (1901–1971), film director
- Mstislav Rostropovich (1927–2007), cellist
- Elena Rozmirovich (1886–1953), politician
- Nikolai Rubinstein (1835–1881), pianist and composer
- Lidiya Ruslanova (1900–1973), folk singer

== Notable burials: S ==
- Alexander Saburov (1908–1974), army general and politician
- Ivan Samylovsky (1905–1971), diplomat
- Otto Schmidt (1891–1956), scientist
- Alfred Schnittke (1934–1998), composer
- Alexander Scriabin (1872–1915), composer
- Ivan Sechenov (1829–1905), physiologist
- Nikolai Semashko (1874–1949), politician
- Yuri Senkevich (1937–2003), explorer
- Valentin Serov (1865–1911), writer and artist
- Boris Shcherbina (1919–1990), politician, oversaw recovery efforts after 1986 Chernobyl disaster and 1988 Spitak earthquake
- Alexey Shchusev (1873–1949), architect
- Vissarion Shebalin (1902–1963), composer
- Dmitri Shepilov (1905–1995), politician
- Dmitri Shostakovich (1906–1975), composer
- Vladimir Shukhov (1853–1939), civil engineer
- Vasily Shukshin (1929–1974), writer and actor
- Innokenty Smoktunovsky (1925–1994), actor
- Pyotr Sobennikov (1894–1960), general
- Leonid Sobinov (1872–1934), tenor and director of the Bolshoi Theatre
- Sergei Sokolov (1911–2012), Marshal of the Soviet Union, defense minister
- Vladimir Solovyov (1853–1900), philosopher
- Konstantin Stanislavski (1863–1938), theater director
- Alexei Starobinsky (1948-2023), theoretical physicist and cosmologist
- Pavel Sukhoi (1895–1975), aerospace engineer
- Leopold Sulerzhitsky (1872–1916), theater practitioner
- Mikhail Arkadyevich Svetlov (1903–1964), poet
- Georgy Sviridov (1915–1998), composer

== Notable burials: T–Z ==
- Viktor Talalikhin (1918–1941), heroic army lieutenant
- Sergei Taneyev (1856–1915), composer
- Yelizaveta Tarakhovskaya (1891–1968), poet and playwright
- Yevgeny Tarle (1874–1955), historian
- Vladimir Tatlin (1885–1953), painter and architect
- Vasily Tikhomirov (1876–1956), choreographer
- Nikolai Tikhonov (1905–1997), politician
- Gherman Titov (1935–2000), cosmonaut, second man in space
- Aleksey Tolstoy (1882–1945), writer
- Pavel Tretyakov (1832–1898), businessman and art collector
- Andrei Tupolev (1888–1972), aircraft designer
- Aleksandr Tvardovsky (1910–1971), writer
- Galina Ulanova (1909–1998), prima ballerina
- Vasili Ulrikh (1889–1951), military judge
- Mikhail Ulyanov (1927–2007), actor
- Yevgeny Vakhtangov (1883–1922), theater director
- Arkady Volsky (1932–2006), politician and businessman
- Sergey Vavilov (1891–1951), physicist
- Vladimir Vernadsky (1863–1945), mineralogist and a geochemist
- Alexander Vertinsky (1889–1957), singer
- Dziga Vertov (1896–1954), filmmaker
- Ivan Vinogradov (1891–1983), mathematician
- Galina Vishnevskaya (1926–2012), operatic soprano & wife of Mstislav Rostropovich
- Lev Semyonovich Vygotsky (1896–1934), psychologist
- Boris Yefimov (1899/1900–2008), political cartoonist
- Boris Yeltsin (1931–2007), the first president of the Russian Federation
- Yevgeniy Yevstigneyev (1926–1992), actor
- Yakov Yurovsky (1878–1938), chief executioner of Tsar Nicholas II and his family
- Nikolay Zabolotsky (1903–1958), poet
- Nikolay Zelinskiy (1861–1953), chemist
- Vladimir Zhirinovsky (1946-2022), politician and lawyer
- Georgiy Zhzhonov (1915–2005), actor
