= Ivan Samylovsky =

Ivan Samylovskii (Samylovsky) Иван Самыловский

USSR Ambassador to Afghanistan
- In office 20 June 1947 – 26 May 1948
- Preceded by: Ivan Bakulin
- Succeeded by: Ivan Ivanov

Head of the Near East Department
- In office 1944 – June 1947
- Preceded by: Sergei Kavtaradze
- Succeeded by: Ivan Bakulin

Personal details
- Born: 5 September 1905 Tupanovo, Babushkinsky District, Vologda Oblast
- Died: 29 November 1971 (aged 66) Moscow, Russian SFSR, Soviet Union
- Resting place: Novodevichy cemetery
- Party: Communist Party of the Soviet Union
- Spouse: Maria Samylovskaya
- Education: Leningrad Institute of Oriental Studies
- Profession: Diplomat, politician & journalist
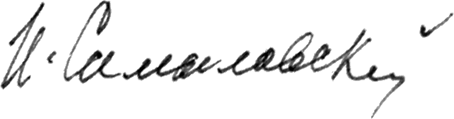
- Signature

Ivan Vasilyevich Samylovskii (Samylovsky) (Russian: Иван Васильевич Самыловский; 5 September 1905 – 29 November 1971) was a Soviet diplomat, politician and journalist. He held the diplomatic rank of Ambassador Extraordinary and Plenipotentiary. He was also the Head of the Department of the Near East of the USSR Ministry for Foreign Affairs (before 1946 known as NKID, i.e. People's Commissariat for Foreign Affairs). In his work he specialized in China, Turkey, Afghanistan, Near and Middle East (including the Palestine question 1944-1947) and the countries of Africa. He is historically known as a leading Soviet specialist in Soviet-Chinese relations.

== Origin and early years ==
Ivan Samylovskii was born on 5 September 1905 in Tupanovo, a small village in the Babushkinsky District of Vologda Oblast, to a Russian peasants family. He graduated in political sciences at the Gubernia school with Cum laude. Ivan then went on to do political and pedagogical work in the Vologodskaya oblast. In 1927 he joined the Army. When his military service was completed he moved to St. Petersburg where he studied in the Leningrad Institute of Oriental Studies Faculty of Political Sciences. He graduated in 1932.

== Diplomatic career ==
=== First diplomatic appointments ===
In 1932 he received his first diplomatic appointment at the Consulate in Kuldja (Ghulja), China. From the end of 1933 to 1936 he worked at his Ph.D., as before in the Leningrad Institute of Oriental Studies. In 1936 he obtained his doctorate on ‘National (ethnic) insurgency in Xinjiang (Sinkiang, Western China) 1930–1935’. He then returned to China in 1936, this time as Vice-Consul and acting Consul-General in the USSR Consulate in Kashgar. After a brief spell in 1939 at the central office of the NKID (until 1946 People's Commissariat for Foreign Affairs; Ministry for Foreign Affairs of the USSR thereafter) he was appointed Consul-General in Kashgar where he served until 1942. In 1942 he was appointed Counselor of the USSR Embassy in Afghanistan, which during World War II became an important strategic region for the Soviet Union. In 1943 he participated in the Tehran Conference.

=== Head of the Near East Department ===
In 1944, at the age of 39, Samylovskii was promoted and appointed Head of the Near East Department of the NKID. The Near East Department emerged in 1944 from the larger Middle East Department headed by Sergey Kavtaradze. In 1944 it comprised the Arab countries, the territory of Palestine and countries of Northern Africa.

==== Main activities ====
During this time he participated in two major international fora: the February 1945 Yalta Conference and the Potsdam Conference in July 1945. An ardent patriot, he initiated steps which led to the strengthening of the role of the Soviet Union in the region of the Near East and elsewhere in the international arena. Relations with the countries of the region became more active, in particular with Syria, Lebanon, Iraq, and Egypt. He also chaired the Commission on national minorities in the countries of the region and Turkey. He continued to work on issues of security regarding some of the principal frontiers, including the Black Sea/Mediterranean Straits of the Bosporus and the Dardanelles (Turkish Straits).

==== The Palestine question 1944 – June 1947 ====
Palestine, at that time under the British Mandate of 1922, was the responsibility of Samylovskii as Head of the Near East Department. During and immediately after World War II the Palestine question was on the USSR's diplomatic agenda through the NKID's Commission for the Preparation of Peace Agreements and Postwar Settlements during 1943-45, chaired by Maxim Litvinov. By July 1945 this Commission had drafted a series of conclusions on the Palestine question which were considered as the basis of Soviet policy immediately after World War II. Not resolved in 1945, the Palestine question became more and more acute during 1946, requiring a highly sensitive diplomatic approach. Early in 1947 it was brought formally to the attention of the United Nations and it was decided as a matter of urgency to convene the First Special Session of the United Nations General Assembly in the Spring of 1947, exclusively on Palestine. The main aim of Soviet policy regarding the Palestine question was to find a just solution for both the Arab and the Jewish populations of Palestine, to secure equal rights for both, to guarantee their independence by terminating the British Mandate and to obtain the withdrawal of foreign troops from Palestine. Samylovskii signed the directives, prepared by his Department, to the Soviet delegation at the First Special Session of the UN General Assembly.

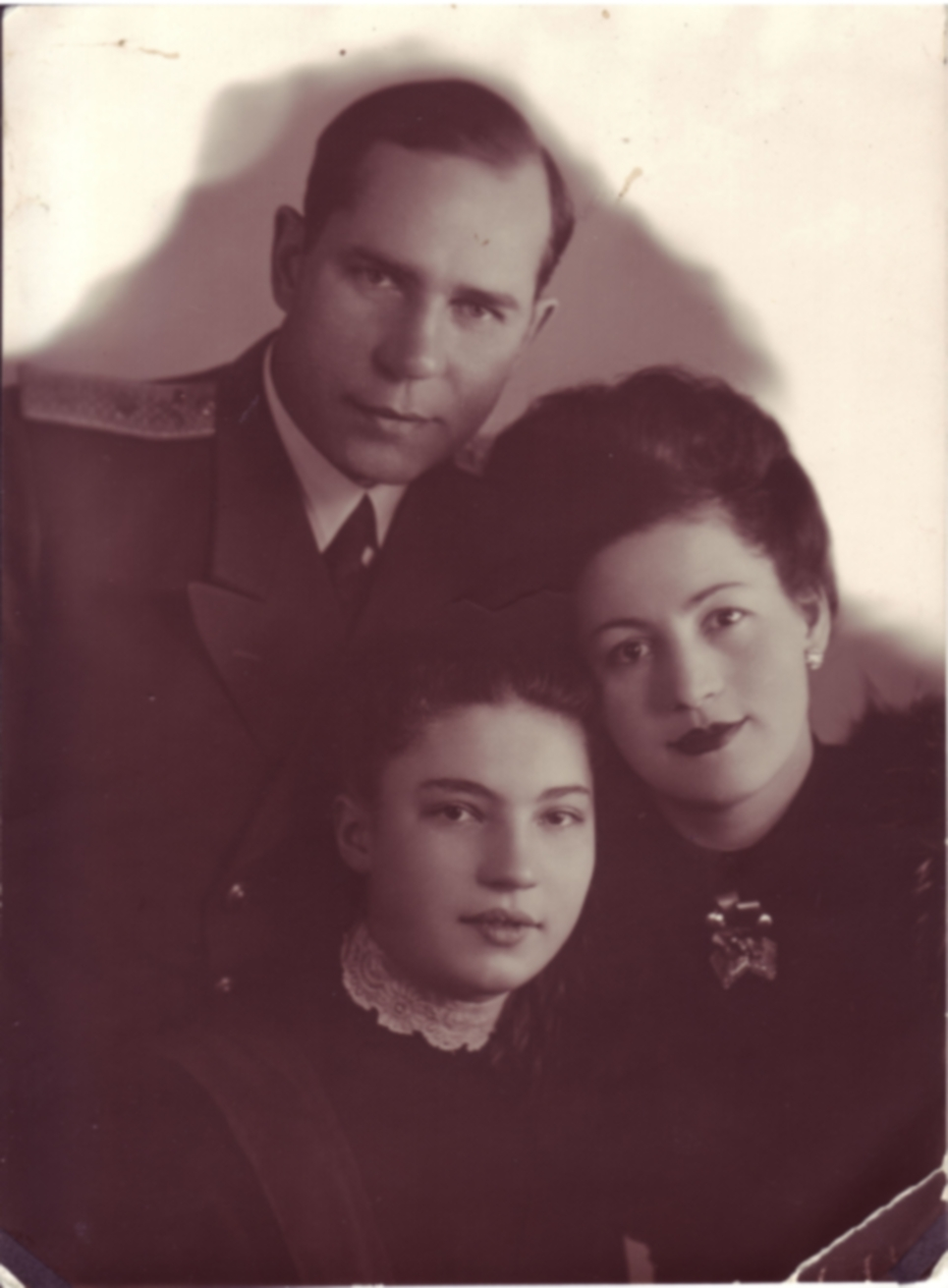
Ivan Samylovskii with his wife Maria Samylovskaya and their daughter Galina in Spring 1947.

In discussions at the First Special Session, New York 28 April to 15 May 1947, the Soviet stand on the Palestine question was confirmed, i.e. preferably the establishment of an independent single Jewish-Arab State with equal rights for both the Arab and Jewish populations. The Soviet delegation conceded that in case this plan could not be implemented, and the Jewish and Arab populations could not be reconciled, and only then, should a “second plan be considered, which would provide for the partition of Palestine into two independent single states, one Jewish and one Arab”. Following the decisions of the First Special Session, the Special Committee on Palestine, established by this session, elaborated two proposals and submitted them to the Second Session of the UN General Assembly in November 1947, where a majority of countries, including the Soviet Union, voted in favour of the United Nations Partition Plan for Palestine, and by this voting, on 29 November 1947, the U.N. General Assembly adopted a resolution recommending the adoption and implementation of the Plan as the United Nations Resolution 181.

=== End of diplomatic career ===
In June 1947, Samylovskii received a new appointment – he was sent to Afghanistan and on the 20th of June he was presented with his credentials as Extraordinary and Plenipotentiary Ambassador of the USSR in Afghanistan. He served in this position, his final diplomatic service, less than a year.

== Post-diplomatic service ==
At the end of 1948 Samylovskii was appointed Chief radio-broadcast editor and Head of the Department of Broadcasting to countries of the East (i.e. Middle, Near and Far East) of the State Radio-Committee . In 1957 he was appointed Head of the Department for the Near and Middle East and Africa of the State Committee on Cultural Cooperation with Foreign Countries under the USSR Council of Ministers, where he worked until 1968. During this period Samylovskii was also a member of the Editorial Board of the magazine “Asia and Africa Today”.

Despite the fact that his diplomatic career ended early Samylovskii continued, from a different rostrum, to contribute to the relations of the USSR with countries of Asia, Africa and the Near and Middle East. He published six books (listed in the section "Bibliography") and numerous articles on this subject. Samylovskii is a recipient of the three State Orders of the USSR, of the Honorary Award by the Supreme Council of Armenia and of the Award «Honorary Radio Broadcaster”.

== Death and legacy ==
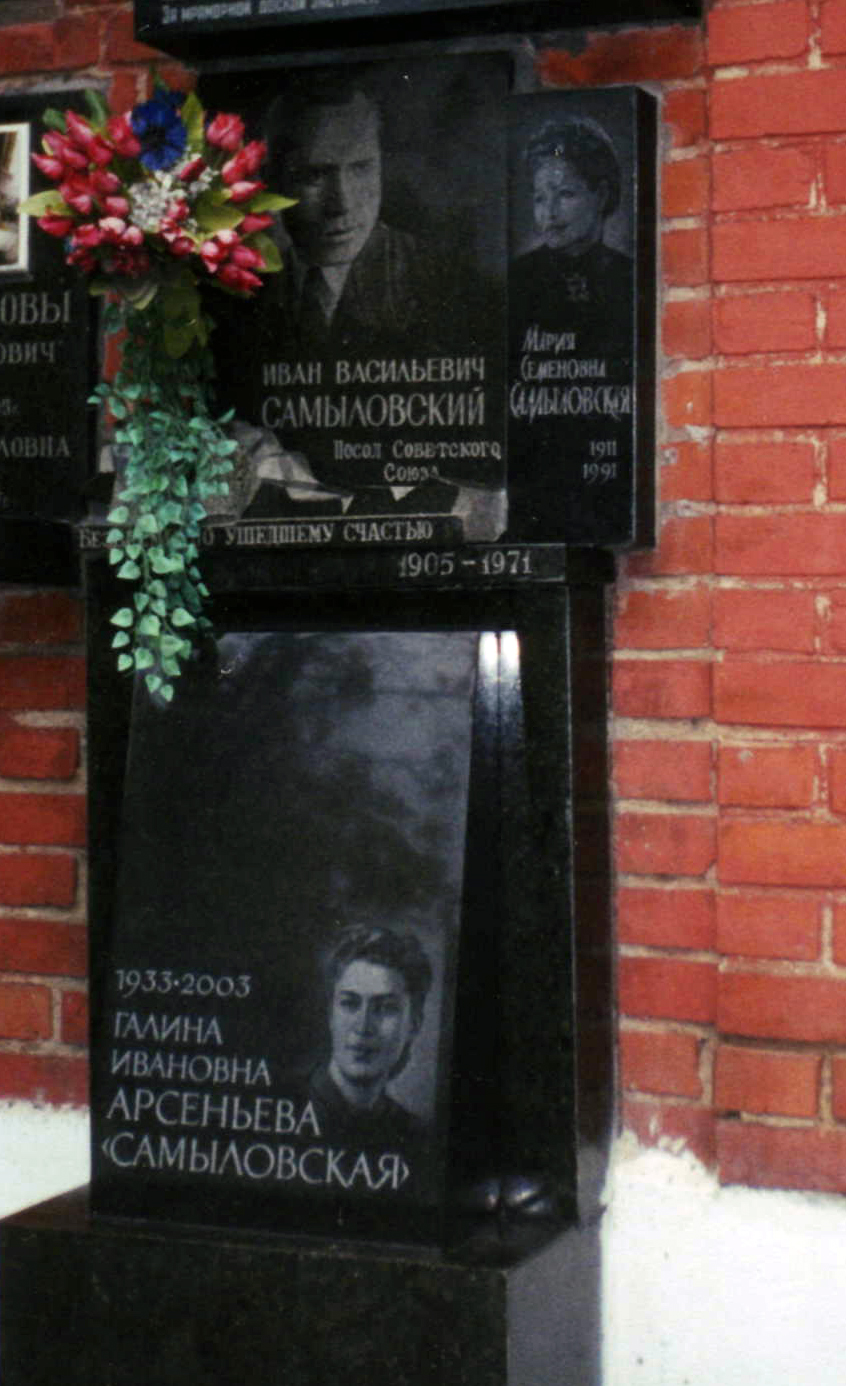
Ivan Samylovskii burial with his wife and daughter at the Novodevichy cemetery in Moscow. Photo taken in March 2008.

Samylovskii died in 1971 and was buried at the Novodevichy Cemetery in Moscow. During his lifetime only his diplomatic contribution to Soviet-Chinese relations was appraised, as well as his activities in respect of Afghanistan. His other contributions were less well known, including his role in the Palestine issue during 1944-1947, until a joint publication of the Ministry of Foreign Affairs of Russia and of the Ministry of Foreign Affairs of Israel ‘Documents on Israeli-Soviet Relations 1941-1953’ was published in 2000. This contained a number of important, secret and top secret documents signed by Samylovskii personally, endorsed by him or prepared under his supervision by his Department.

He was married to Maria Samylovskaya (maiden name Veksler). Maria Veksler was born in Kalynivka, Vinnytsia Oblast in 1911, to a family of a well-to-do accountant Srul/Izrael Veksler(Wexler) from Pikov (b. 1884-d.1959) and Eva/Hava Korf from Medzhybizh (b. 1883-d.1956). Maria Veksler had four siblings: sister Adele (b. 1905-d.1987), and brothers Grigorii (b. 1906-d.1943), Iossif (b. 1910-d.1985) and David (b. 1920-d.2002). In 1926 she left Vinnitsa and moved with her parents and brothers to St. Petersburg, where she met Ivan Samylovskii two years later. They got married in St.Petersburg in 1931. Their union lasted 40 years, until Ivan Samylovskii's death in 1971. Maria Samylovskaya made a teaching career (had the title of the Renown Teacher of the USSR). She died in Moscow in 1991. Their daughter Galina Arsenyeva (maiden name Samylovskaya, b.1933 - d.2003), continued and developed studies of Ivan Samylovskii on China. The family are buried in the same location at the Novodevichy Cemetery in Moscow.

The biography is prepared by Ivan Samylovskii's granddaughter. A detailed political and family portrait was published in book form in 2012.

== Bibliography ==
- 1951 O turetskom “neitralitete” vo vtoroi mirovoi voine (published under the name I.Vasilyev)
- 1952 Turtsiia - votchina Uoll-strita
- 1955 Ėkspansiia amerikanskogo imperializma na Blizhnem i Srednem Vostoke
- 1956 Pancha shila; piat printsipov mezhdunarodnykh otnosheniĭ
- 1958 Mei di guo zhu yi dui Zhong Jin dong de qin lue, Lanyin Huang
- 1963 Nauchnye i kul'turnye sviazi SSSR so stranami Azii i Afriki
