= List of ambassadors of Russia and the Soviet Union to Afghanistan =

Ambassador of the Russian Federation to Afghanistan
- Emblem of the Ministry of Foreign Affairs of Russia
- Incumbent; Dmitry Zhirnov since 29 April 2020
- Style: His Excellency
- Seat: Kabul
- Appointer: The president of Russia
- Formation: 7 April 1919
- First holder: Yakov Surits as Plenipotentiary Representative
- Website: Embassy of Russia in Kabul

The ambassador extraordinary and plenipotentiary of the Russian Federation to Afghanistan is the official representative of the president and the government of the Russian Federation to Afghanistan.

The ambassador and his staff work at large in the Embassy of Russia in Kabul. The post of Russian ambassador to Afghanistan is currently held by Dmitry Zhirnov, incumbent since 29 April 2020.

== History of diplomatic relations ==
The Russian Soviet Federative Socialist Republic provided unofficial assistance to the Emirate of Afghanistan during the Third Anglo-Afghan War, helping the country to achieve full independence from British influence. The Russian Soviet Federative Socialist Republic was also the first country to recognize and established diplomatic relations with Afghanistan in 1919. Yakov Surits, a former diplomatic representative to Denmark, was appointed plenipotentiary to Afghanistan. On 23 July 1923 relations established at the level of embassies.

From 1992 to 2002, during the years of Taliban rule, diplomatic relations were broken off and no ambassadors were appointed.

== List of representatives (1919–present) ==
=== Russian Soviet Federative Socialist Republic to the Emirate of Afghanistan (1919–1922) ===
Name	Title	Appointment	Termination	Notes
Yakov Surits	Plenipotentiary	13 July 1919	1921	
Fyodor Raskolnikov	Plenipotentiary	16 July 1921	1922	

=== Soviet Union to the Emirate of Afghanistan (1922–1926) ===
Name	Title	Appointment	Termination	Notes
Fyodor Raskolnikov	Plenipotentiary	1922	6 February 1924	
Leonid Stark	Plenipotentiary	22 April 1924	1926	

=== Soviet Union to the Kingdom of Afghanistan (1926–1973) ===
Name	Title	Appointment	Termination	Notes
Leonid Stark	Plenipotentiary	1926	16 April 1936	
Boris Skvirsky	Plenipotentiary	16 April 1936	1 November 1937	
Konstantin Mikhailov	Plenipotentiary (until 9 May 1941); Ambassador (after 9 May 1941)	24 December 1937	1 September 1943	
Ivan Bakulin	Ambassador	11 November 1943	23 June 1947	
Ivan Samylovsky	Ambassador	23 June 1947	27 May 1948	
Ivan Ivanov	Ambassador	27 May 1948	11 July 1948	
Artemy Fedorov	Ambassador	6 November 1948	10 July 1953	
Mikhail Degtyar	Ambassador	10 July 1953	5 June 1960	
Sergey Antonov	Ambassador	5 June 1960	8 October 1965	
Konstantin Alexandrov	Ambassador	8 October 1965	11 November 1969	
Sergey Kiktev	Ambassador	11 November 1969	3 October 1972	
Alexander Puzanov	Ambassador	3 October 1972	1973	

=== Soviet Union to the Republic of Afghanistan (1973–1978) ===
Name	Title	Appointment	Termination	Notes
Alexander Puzanov	Ambassador	1973	1978	

=== Soviet Union to the Democratic Republic of Afghanistan (1978–1991) ===
Name	Title	Appointment	Termination	Notes
Alexander Puzanov	Ambassador	1978	10 November 1979	
Fikryat Tabeyev	Ambassador	10 November 1979	13 August 1986	
Pavel Mozhayev	Ambassador	13 August 1986	15 March 1988	
Nikolai Yegorychev	Ambassador	15 March 1988	14 October 1988	
Yuli Vorontsov	Ambassador	14 October 1988	15 September 1989	
Boris Pastukhov	Ambassador	15 September 1989	25 December 1991	

=== Russian Federation to the Democratic Republic of Afghanistan (1991–1992) ===
Name	Title	Appointment	Termination	Notes
Boris Pastukhov	Ambassador	25 December 1991	22 February 1992	
Yevgeny Ostrovenko	Ambassador	24 January 1992	31 December 1992	

=== Russian Federation to the Islamic Republic of Afghanistan (2002–present) ===
Name	Title	Appointment	Termination	Notes
Mikhail Konarovsky	Ambassador	21 February 2002	17 February 2004	
Zamir Kabulov	Ambassador	17 February 2004	21 September 2009	
Andrey Avetsyan	Ambassador	21 September 2009	1 September 2014	
Aleksandr Mantytsky	Ambassador	18 November 2014	29 April 2020	
Dmitry Zhirnov	Ambassador	29 April 2020		
