= Serafima Bryusova =

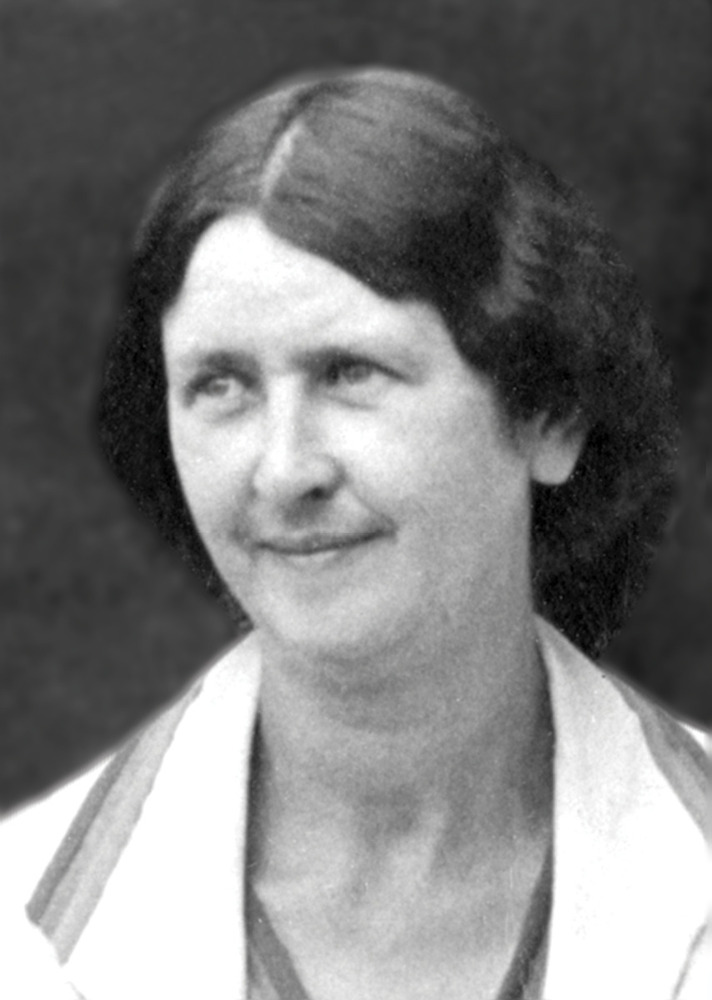
- Born: Serafima Semyonovna Sidorova; December 31, 1894; Moscow, Russian Empire
- Died: 1958 (aged 62–63); Moscow, Soviet Union
- Burial place: Novodevichy Cemetery
- Education: Second Moscow State University
- Spouse: Alexander Bryusov

Born Serafima Semyonovna Sidorova, Serafima Bryusova (31 December 1894 - 1958 in Moscow) was one of the world's first female neurosurgeons, and played a major role in the formation of Russian neurosurgery. She was both a medical doctor and Doctor of Philosophy, and spent much of her life doing research and making advances in the field of neurosurgery. Bryusova is one of the first four females that practiced neurosurgery around the world, and possibly the world’s first female neurosurgeon. Most likely due to the Cold War, Bryusova’s work is largely unknown and unappreciated.

== Biography ==
=== Education ===
Bryusova initially studied philology and history, but became a nurse on the frontlines during World War I, where she gained an interest in medicine, leading to a change in her career path. This was at a time when women were first being allowed to practice medicine, both throughout many societies globally and within Russia. In 1917, she began studying at the second Moscow Institute for Medicine, which she graduated from in 1923. She then became a resident at the Hospital Surgical Clinic of Yaroslavl State Medical University. In 1925, she was accepted into the graduate program at the First Moscow Medical Institute in the Department of Operative Surgery. Throughout the following decade, Bryusova worked as a senior researcher and an associate professor, when she made many advances in her field. She gave a dissertation for a Doctorate of Philosophy in medical sciences in 1939, and was appointed an academic professor of neurosurgery in 1941.

=== Neurosurgery ===
Serafima became one of Nikolay Burdenko’s closest associates. Burdenko established neurosurgery as a distinct field in 1924, and he himself was a military surgeon and revolutionary, known to be the founder of neurosurgery in Russia. Serafima began to work with him in 1929 at the Moscow Neurosurgical Institute, and was trained in all neurological procedures available at the time. She provided clinical treatments for traumatic brain injuries, peripheral nerve injuries, among other things. She studied pain perception in the dura mater, neuro-oncology, and intracranial pressure in patients that had undergone trephination. She published many scientific papers with Nikolay Burdenko, A. A. Arendtom, and Yu. V. Konovalov. She also wrote “Brain Angiography,” which was the first Russian monograph on cerebral angiography in 1951. This work documented the presence of fetal posterior communicating arteries and previously unknown features of the Circle of Willis. She made these observations with human specimens, primarily noting the asymmetry and anatomical inconsistency of this structure. This monograph became hugely important to future studies.

=== Translation ===
In December 1941, Bryusova had to retire from neurosurgery when she became ill with severe arthritis, which led her to utilize her previous studying of philology and literacy in four different languages. She dedicated her time to translating important neurosurgical papers into Russian, one of which was “Epilepsy and the functional anatomy of the human brain” by Wilder Penfield. Through her work of translation, she ensured that current and future Russian neurosurgeons would be able to learn from important literature.

=== Personal life ===
She was the wife of famous archeologist Alexander Bryusov, brother of the symbolist poet Valery Bryusov. They had a son named Boris.

== Impact ==
Bryusova made many important advances for female doctors, medical research in Russia, and neurosurgery. She was surrounded by male physicians, but she carved out her own space in neurosurgery in the academic and clinical realms. Because she started her career in medicine when females were first being allowed to practice medicine, her career paved the way for many future female physicians. Her work with the founder of Russian neurosurgery allowed for her to start her career with as much knowledge as was available, and her personal research led the field to expand both in academic knowledge and clinical practice. Not only did she contribute original work to the Russian field of knowledge, but she translated important works from others into Russian, so that the Russian field of neurosurgery could continue to grow after she stopped practicing medicine. While the work that she did influenced innumerable future physicians, she is largely unrecognized in the current field of neurosurgery, likely due to the Cold War.
