= Zamir Kabulov =

Russian diplomat

- Замир Кабулов
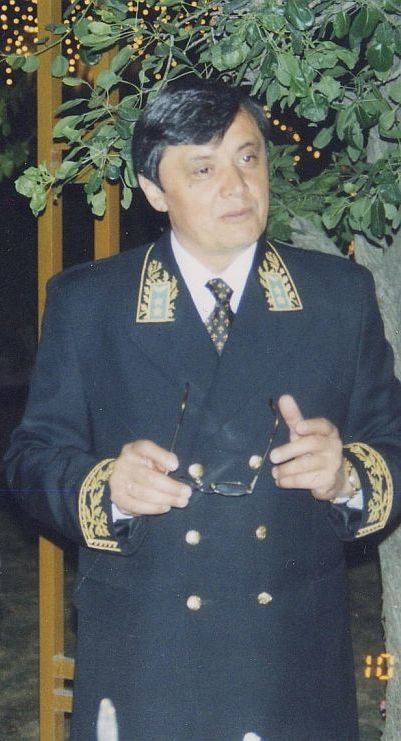

Director of Asian Second Department at Ministry of Foreign Affairs
- Incumbent
- Assumed office 9 November 2009
- Preceded by: Aleksandr Marjasov

Ambassador of Russia to Afghanistan
- In office 17 February 2004 – 21 September 2009
- Preceded by: Mihail Konarovskiy
- Succeeded by: Andrey Avetisyan

Personal details
- Born: 22 June 1954 (age 72) Uzbek Soviet Socialist Republic, USSR
- Education: Moscow State Institute of International Relations
- Awards: Honored Employee of the Diplomatic Service; Order of Honour; Order of Alexander Nevsky; Order "For Personal Courage"; Order of Friendship

Zamir Kabulov (Russian: Замир Кабулов; born 22 June 1954) is a high rank career diplomat and Russian presidential envoy to Afghanistan. He is the Special Representative for Afghanistan since 2022.

Kabulov, who was born in Soviet Uzbekistan, graduated from the Moscow State Institute of International Relations in 1977, and went on to work in various diplomatic posts in the central offices of the Ministry of Foreign Affairs and abroad, in particular in Afghanistan. His Central Asian background further bolstered his position in dealing with Afghan and Pakistani issues. From 1979 to 1983 he worked in the Soviet Embassy in Iran.

From 1983 to 1987 he was second secretary in the Soviet Embassy in Kabul also responsible for relations with the press. From 1987 to 1991 he worked in the Foreign Ministry in Moscow and studied at the Diplomatic Academy in Moscow. In 1991/1992 he was councillor at the Soviet/Russian embassy in Kabul and after the embassy was closed down when the mujahideen took control of Kabul he was posted to the Russian Embassy in Pakistan.

In 1995 Kabulov took part in talks with the Taliban in an attempt to secure the release of a Russian Il-76 crew whose plane was forced to land in Kandahar. During these talks he met with the Taliban leader Mullah Mohammed Omar. Between 1996 and 1998, Kabulov was a senior political adviser in a special mission of the United Nations for Afghanistan, based in Pakistan. Between 1998 and 2004 Kabulov worked as the Foreign Ministry's Deputy Director of the Third Department on Asia, and was a special representative of the Foreign Minister during the 2001 Bonn Agreement talks on Afghanistan.

On 18 March 2004, Kabulov presented his diplomatic credentials to Hamid Karzai, the head of the Transitional Islamic State of Afghanistan. Kabulov has been critical of the NATO mission in Afghanistan, calling it ineffective, due to alleged negligence by NATO in understanding the national, religious and cultural traditions of Afghanistan.

In 2019, Kabulov stated to the Associated Press that the United States "completely failed" in Afghanistan, and allowed Moscow to be a peace broker in the region.

== See also ==
- Ambassador of Russia to Afghanistan
