= Dmitry Zhirnov =

Russian diplomat (born 1977)

- Дмитрий Жирнов

Russian Federation Ambassador to Afghanistan
- Incumbent
- Assumed office April 29, 2020
- President: Vladimir Putin
- Preceded by: Aleksandr Mantytsky

Personal details
- Born: June 1, 1977 (age 49)
- Education: MGIMO
- Profession: Diplomat

Dmitry Aleksandrovich Zhirnov (Russian: Дми́трий Алекса́ндрович Жирно́в; born June 1, 1977) is a Russian government official serving as the Russian Ambassador to Afghanistan.

== Biography ==
Zhirnov was born in 1977.

He completed his studies and received a higher education degree from the Moscow State Institute of International Relations under the Russian Ministry of Foreign Affairs in 2000. After graduation, he began his diplomatic work. He defended his dissertation for the degree of Candidate of Political Sciences.

He worked in the Ministry of Foreign Affairs, with activities at the Central Office and abroad.

From 2016 to 2019, he served as Minister Counselor at the Russian Embassy in the United States.

By decree of Russian President Vladimir Putin on April 29, 2020, he was appointed ambassador of the Russian Federation to Afghanistan.
