= Shakir Geniatullin =

Shakir Nigmatulinovich Geniatullin
- Born: 1895; Kryazhly, Samara Governorate, Russian Empire, (now in Orenburg Oblast, Russian Federation)
- Died: 1946 (aged 50–51); Moscow, Russian SFSR, Soviet Union
- Military career
- Allegiance: Soviet Russia (1918-1919); Bukharan People's Soviet Republic (1919-1924); Soviet Union (1924-1946)
- Branch: Bukharan Red Army; Red Army / Soviet Army
- Service years: 1918–1946
- Rank: Major-general
- Commands: 58th Reserve Army
- Conflicts: Russian Civil War; World War II
- Awards: Order of Lenin; Order of the Red Banner (2x); Order of the Bukharan Banner, 3rd class; Order of the Bukharan Red Crescent, 2nd class and other awards

Shakir Nigmatulinovich Geniatullin (Russian: Шакир Нигматулинович Гениатуллин; 1895 - 1946) was a Soviet military officer and Red Army major-general during World War II.

An ethnic Tatar from a peasant background, Geniatullin served in the cavalry forces of the Russian Socialist Federative Soviet Republic and the pro-Bolshevik Bukharan People's Soviet Republic during the Russian Civil War in Central Asia.

A 1931 graduate of the Frunze Military Academy and 1939 graduate of the General Staff Academy, he was a chief of staff of the 58th Reserve Army in the Second World War and won the Order of Lenin.

== Biography ==
Shakir Geniatullin was born in Kryazhly, a village in the Samara Governorate of the Russian Empire (now in Samara Oblast, Russian Federation). He came from a Tatar peasant family and was briefly educated at a local madrasah.

Supportive of the Bolshevik-led October Revolution in 1917, Geniatullin volunteered for the Red Army of Soviet Russia in 1918 and studied at the Tashkent Red Commanders' School in Central Asia, where he joined the Bolshevik Party in 1919. He then served in the cavalry of the national Red Army of Bukhara following the proclamation of the Bukharan People's Soviet Republic in 1919.

He took part in the fighting against the Basmachi movement with the Bukharan forces on various occasions during the Russian Civil War, for which he was twice awarded the Order of the Red Banner (in 1922 and 1923), the Bukharan People's Soviet Republic's Order of the Bukharan Banner, 3rd class in 1922, and Order of the Bukharan Red Crescent, 2nd class in 1923.

Geniatullin moved to Moscow to attend the Frunze Military Academy in 1928. He was a staff officer in the cavalry after graduating from the academy in 1931 and attended the General Staff Academy in 1937-1939, graduating with distinction. He was awarded the rank of major-general by the Council of People's Commissars in 1940, when the traditional general officers' ranks were first introduced into the Soviet military, and served in the Cavalry Inspectorate of the Red Army General Staff until the German invasion in 1941.

In wartime, Geniatullin was chief of staff for the 58th Reserve Army, then attached to the General Staff. Geniatullin was awarded the Order of Lenin toward the end of his career, which he received in person from Mikhail Kalinin at an awards ceremony at the Kremlin during the war.

He died in 1946 and was interred at the Novodevichy Cemetery in Moscow.
