= Novodevichy Cemetery =

Cemetery in Moscow, Russia

- Новодевичье кладбище
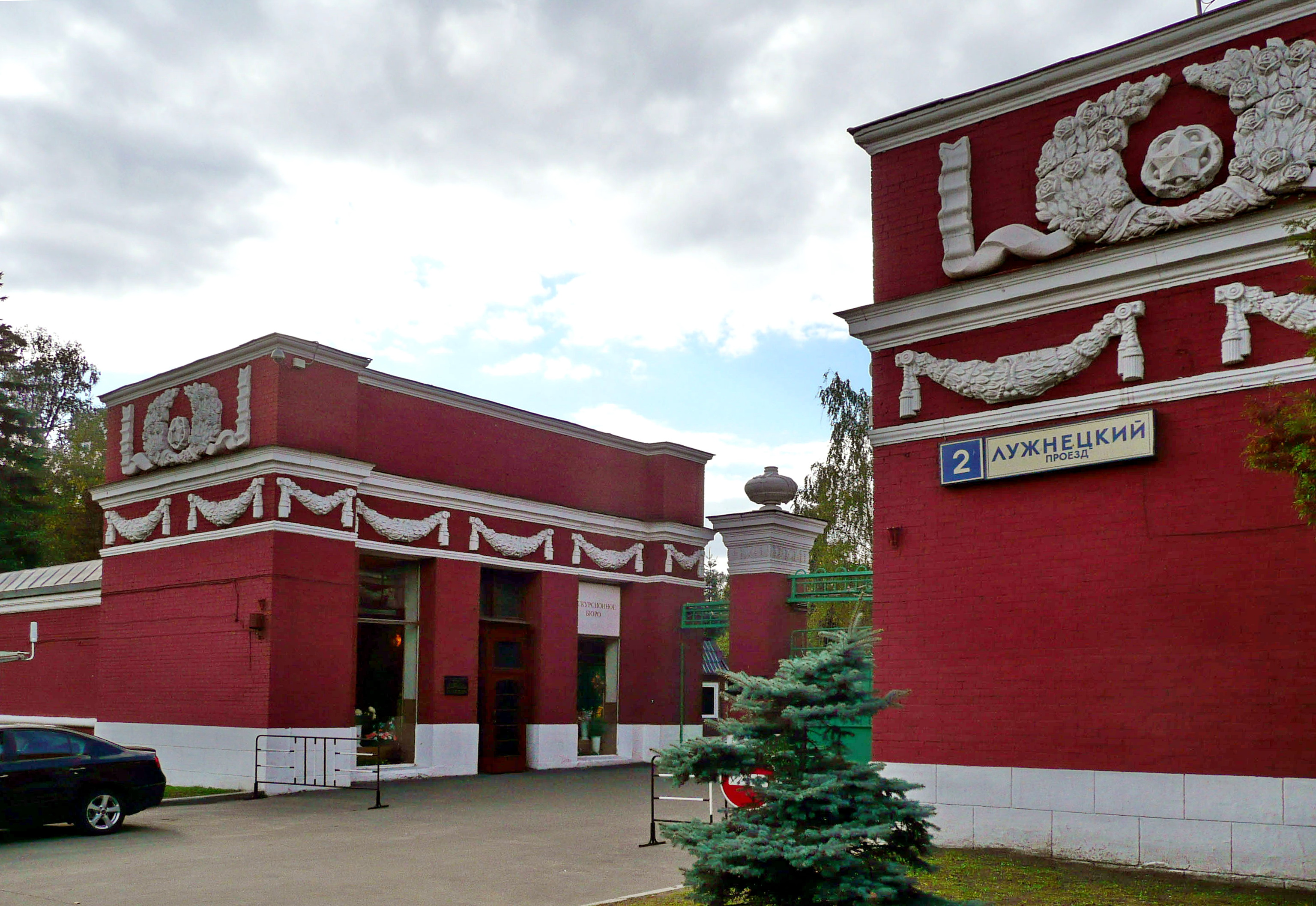
- Interactive map of Novodevichy Cemetery

Details
- Established: 1898
- Location: Moscow
- Country: Russian Federation (from 1922 until 1991 - Soviet Union)
- Coordinates: 55°43′29″N 37°33′15″E
- Size: 7.5 hectares (19 acres)
- No. of interments: 26,000

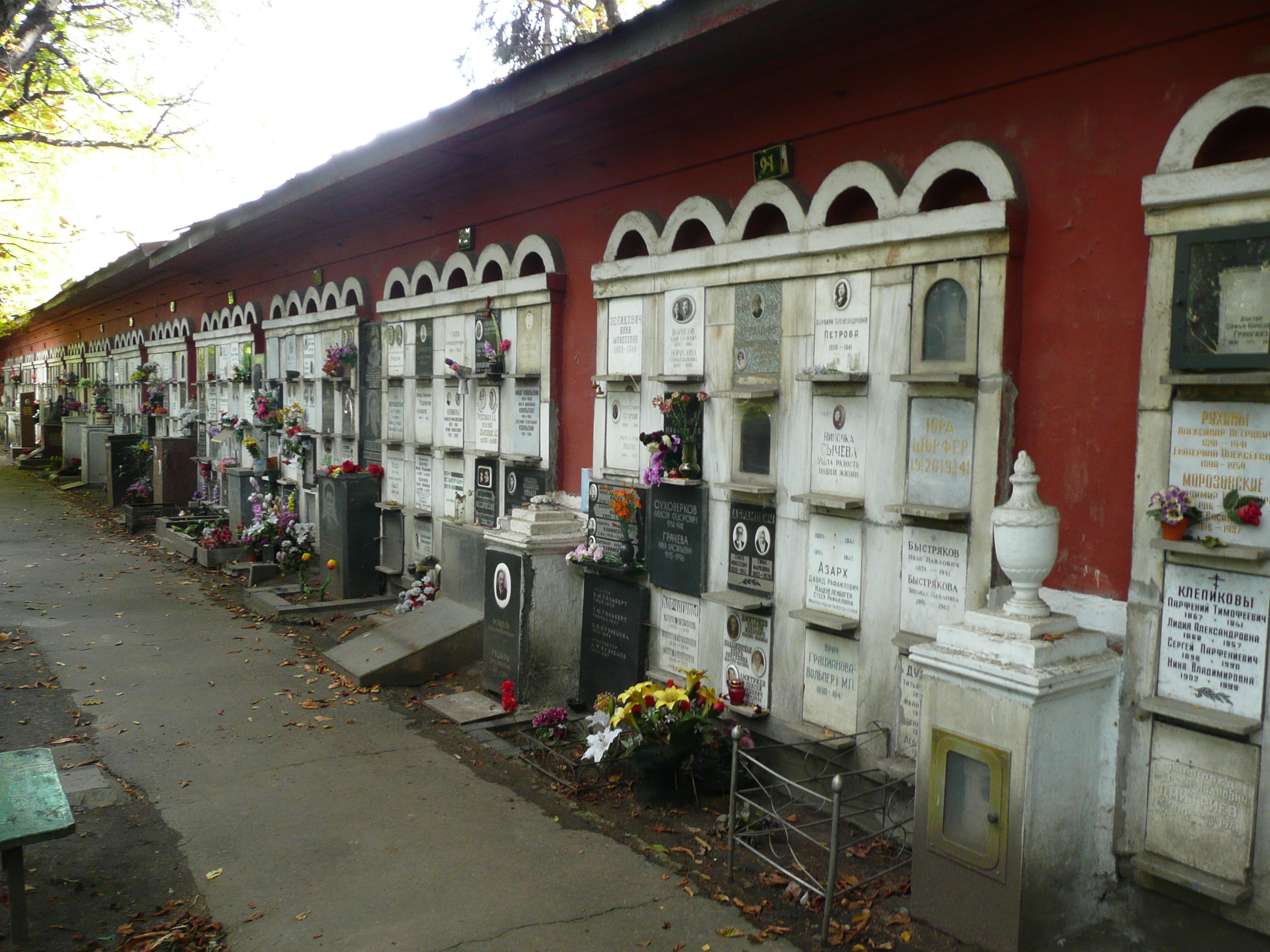
The cemetery wall is used as a columbarium.

Novodevichy Cemetery (Russian: Новодевичье кладбище, romanized: Novodevichye kladbishche; Russian pronunciation: [nəvɐˈdʲevʲɪt͡ɕɪj ˈkɫadbʲɪɕːe]) is a cemetery in Moscow, Russia (from 1922 until 1991 Soviet Union) . It lies next to the southern wall of the 16th-century Novodevichy Convent.

== History ==
The cemetery was designed by Ivan Mashkov and inaugurated in 1898. Its importance dates from the 1930s, when the necropolises of the medieval Muscovite monasteries (Simonov, Danilov, Donskoy) were scheduled for demolition. Only the Donskoy survived the Joseph Stalin era relatively intact. The remains of many famous Russians buried in other abbeys, such as Nikolai Gogol and Sergey Aksakov, were disinterred and reburied at the Novodevichy. The 19th-century necropolis within the walls of the Novodevichy convent, which contained the graves of about 2000 Russian noblemen and university professors, also underwent reconstruction. The vast majority of graves were destroyed.

During the Soviet Union, burial in the Novodevichy Cemetery was second in prestige only to burial in the Kremlin Wall Necropolis. Among the Soviet leaders, Nikita Khrushchev and Mikhail Gorbachev would be buried there. Since the fall of the Soviet Union, the Kremlin Wall is no longer used for burials and the Novodevichy Cemetery is used for only the most symbolically significant burials. In 1997, former premier Nikolai Tikhonov was buried in the cemetery at state expense (since he didn't have any money of his own). In April 2007, within one week both the first President of the Russian Federation Boris Yeltsin and cellist Mstislav Rostropovich were buried there.

Today, the cemetery holds the tombs of Russian authors, musicians, playwrights, and poets, as well as famous actors, political leaders, and scientists. Notable burials include Dmitry Shostakovich, Sergei Prokofiev and Anton Chekhov. More than 27,000 are buried at Novodevichy. There is scant space for more burials. A new national cemetery has been opened in Mytishchi north of Moscow.

The cemetery has a park-like ambience, dotted with small chapels and large sculpted monuments. It is divided into the old (Divisions 1–4), new (Divisions 5–8) and newest (Divisions 9–11) sections; maps are available at the cemetery office.

== Monuments ==
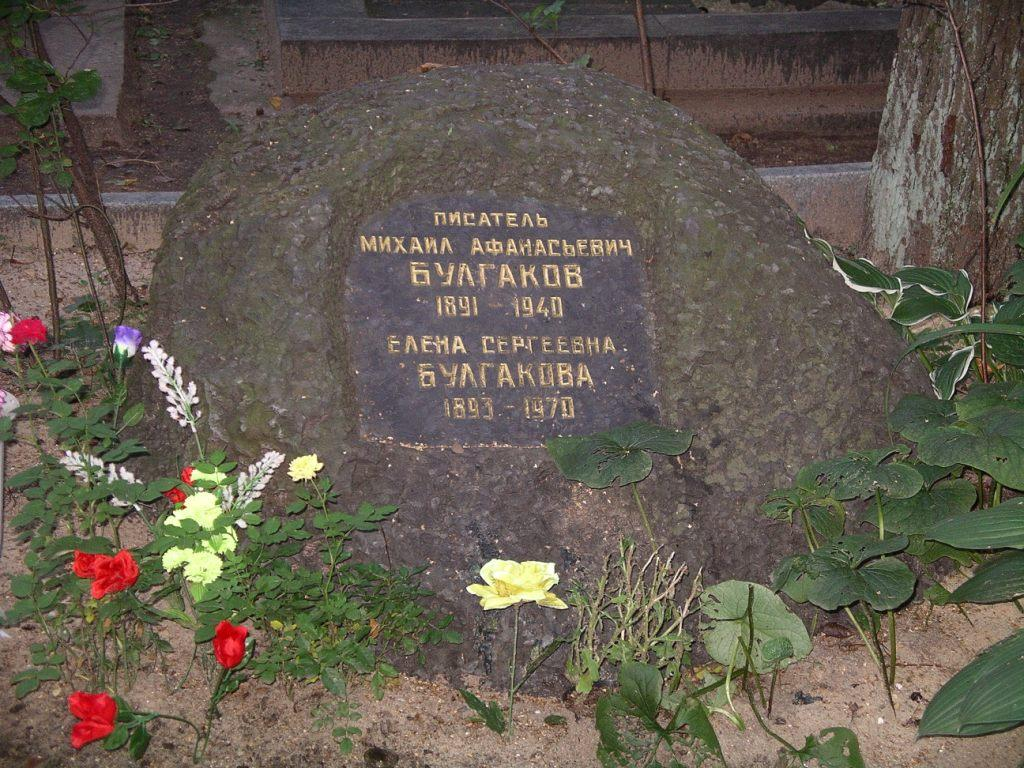
Mikhail Bulgakov

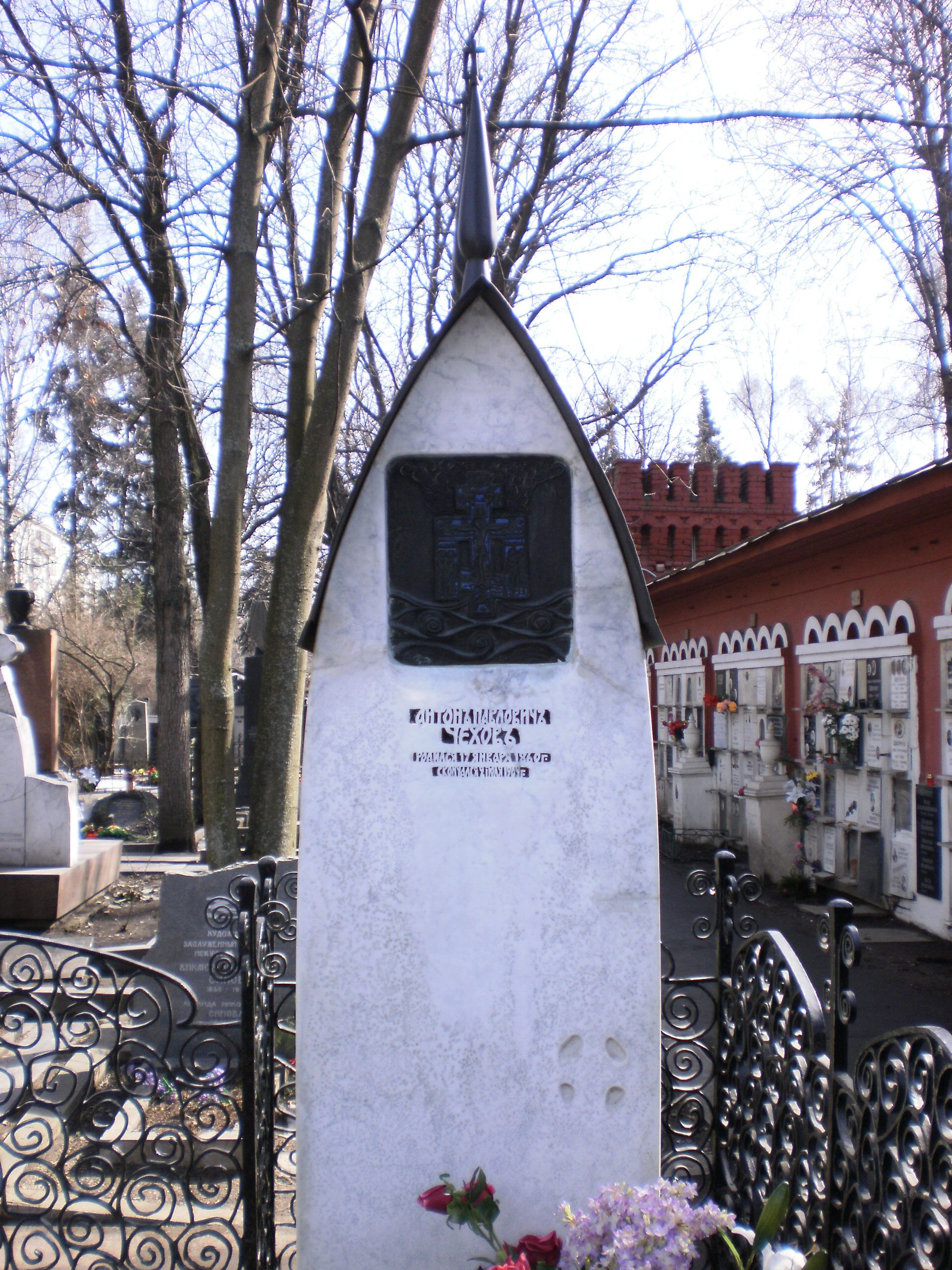
Anton Chekhov

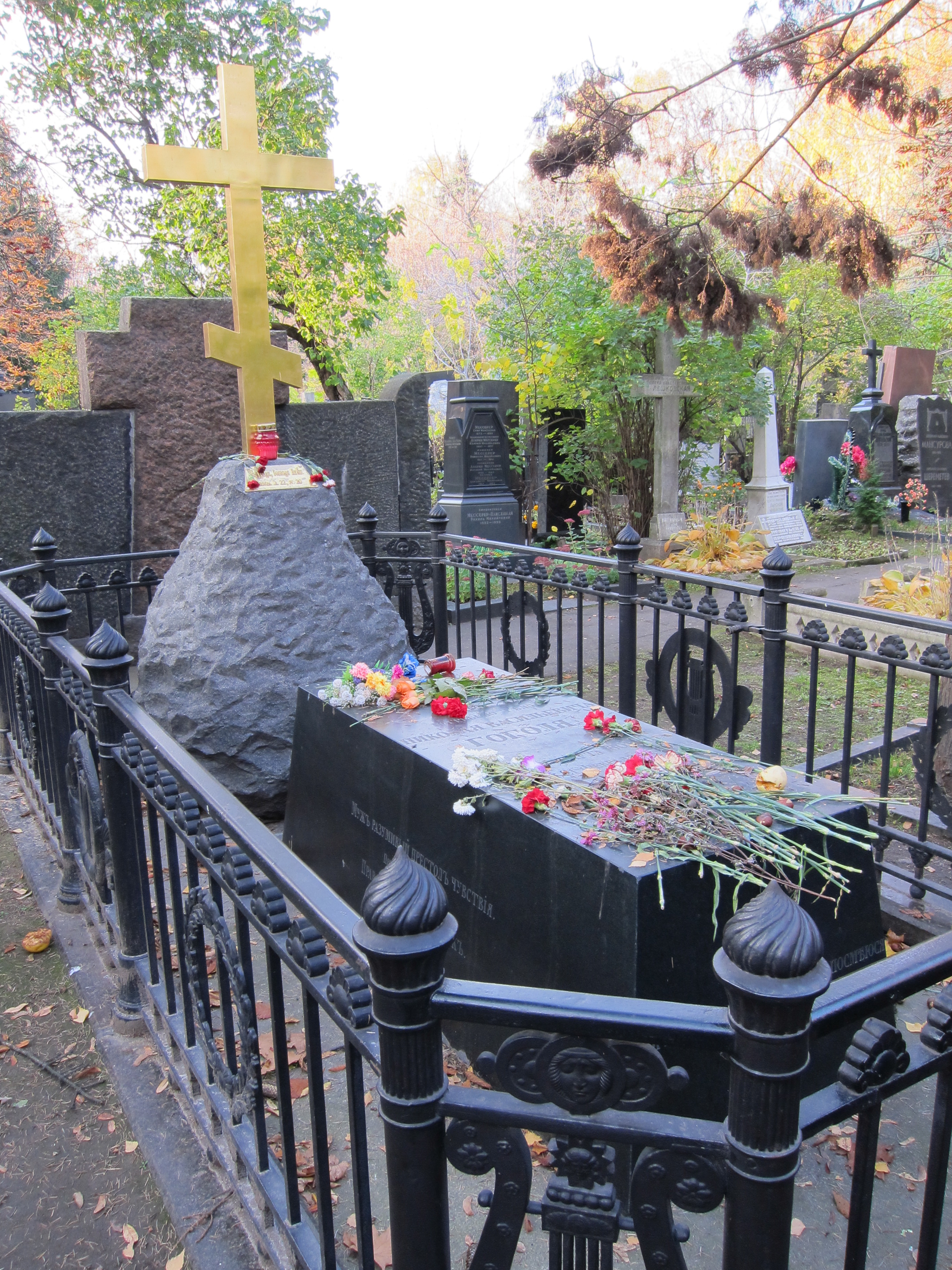
Nikolai Gogol

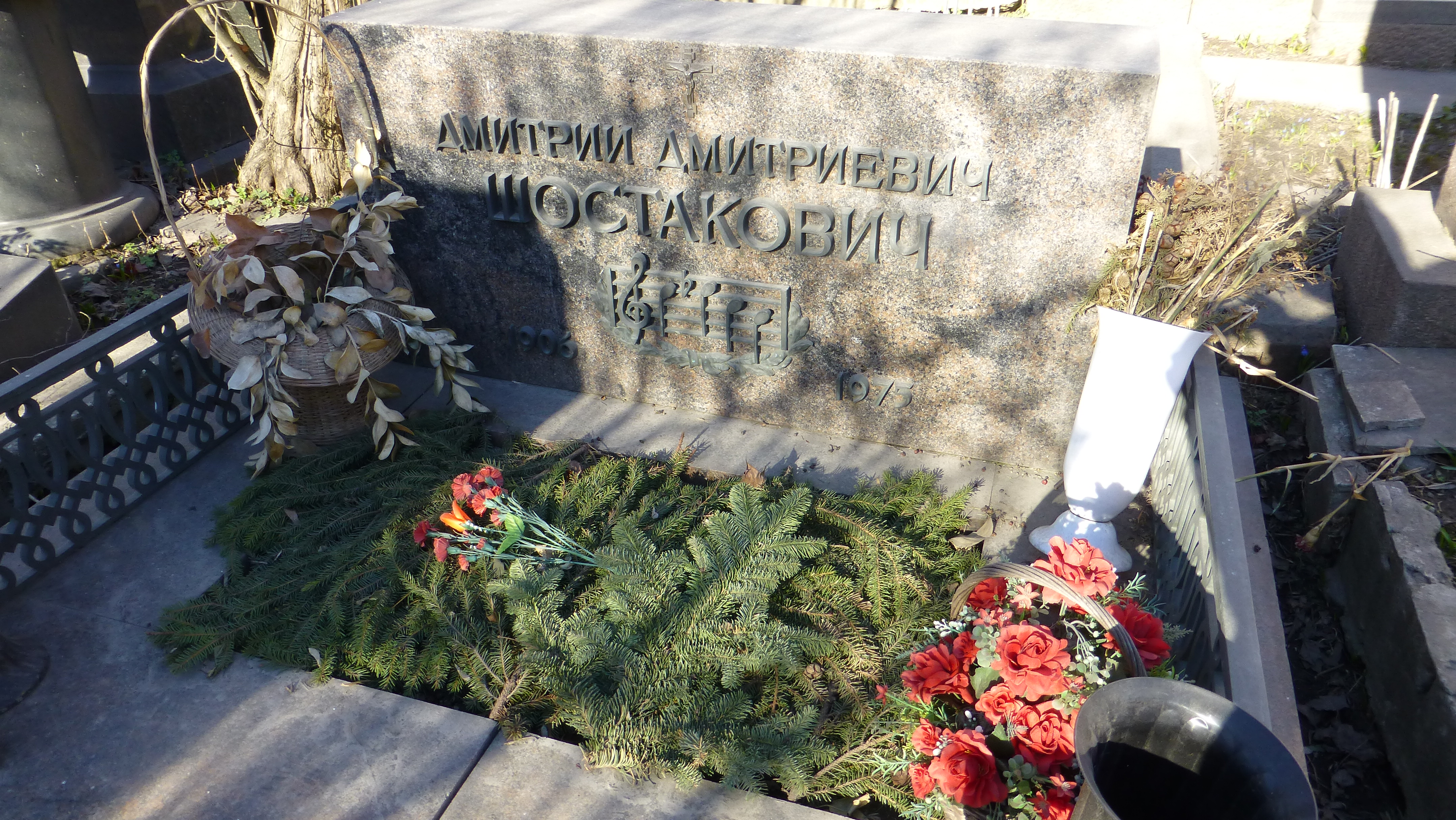
Dmitri Shostakovich

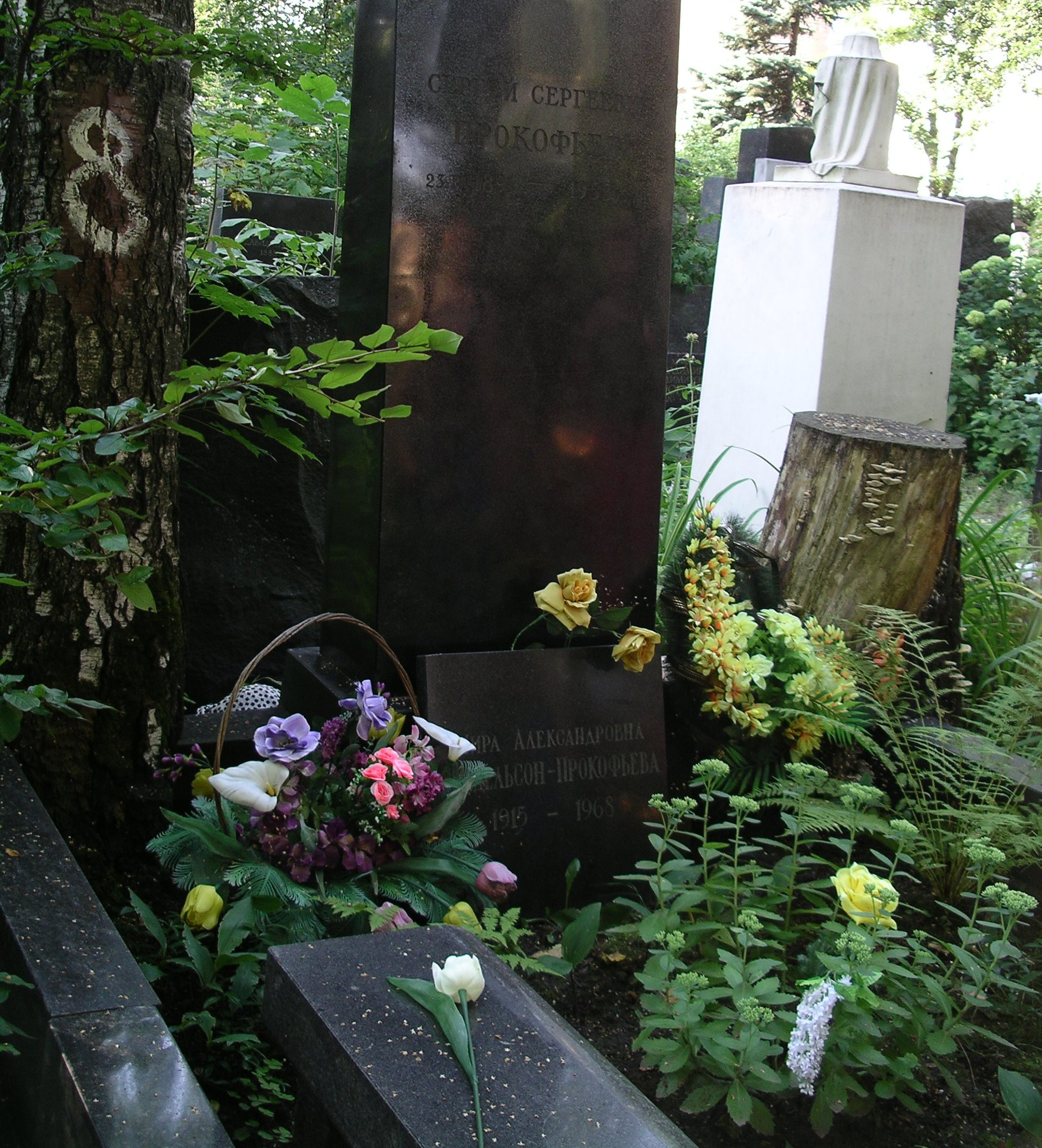
Sergei Prokofiev and his wife Mira Mendelson

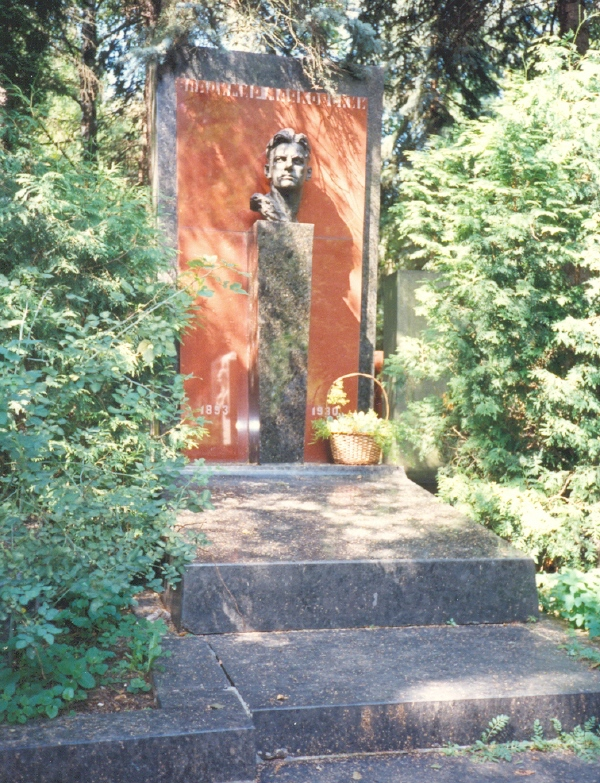
Vladimir Mayakovsky

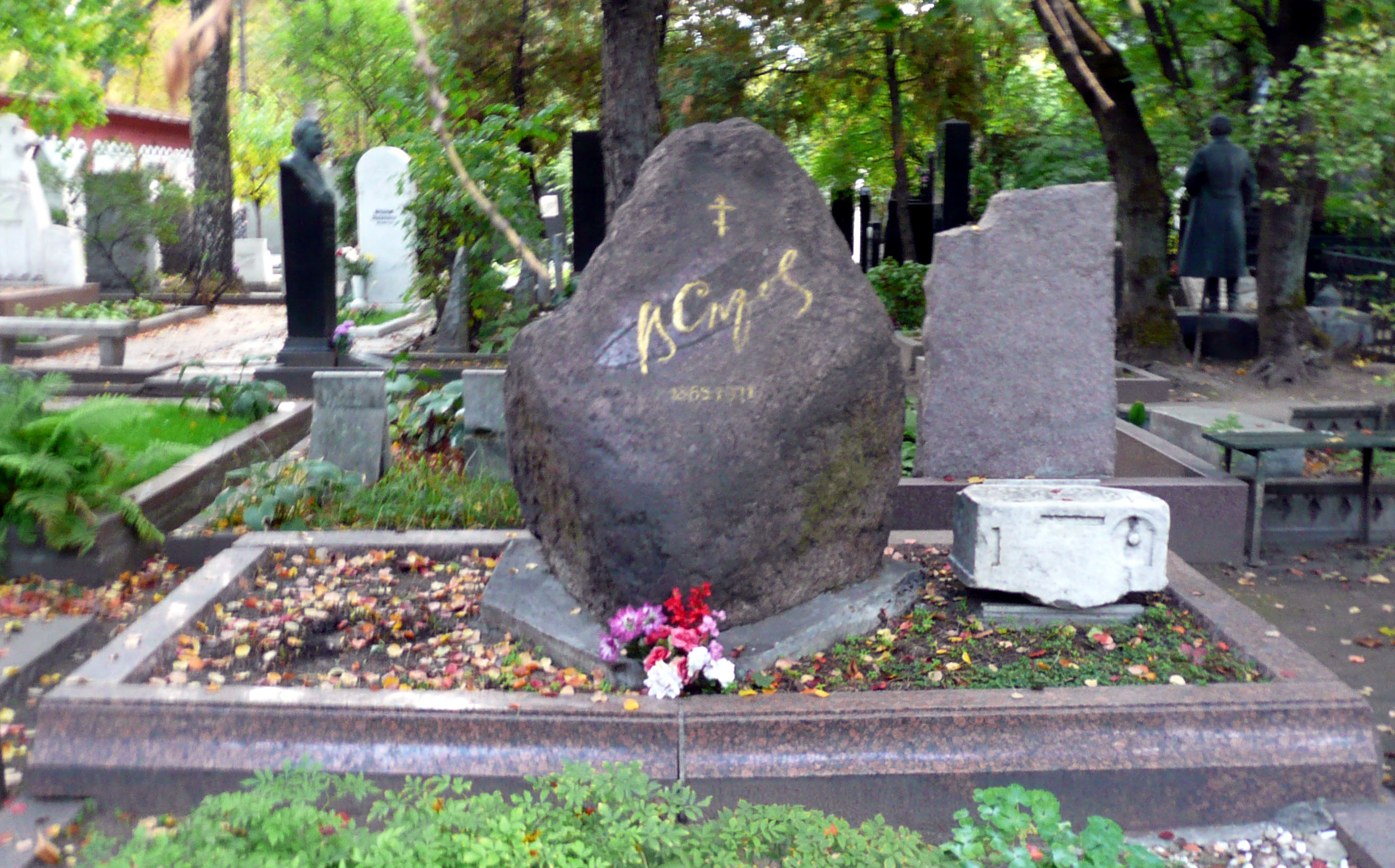
Valentin Serov

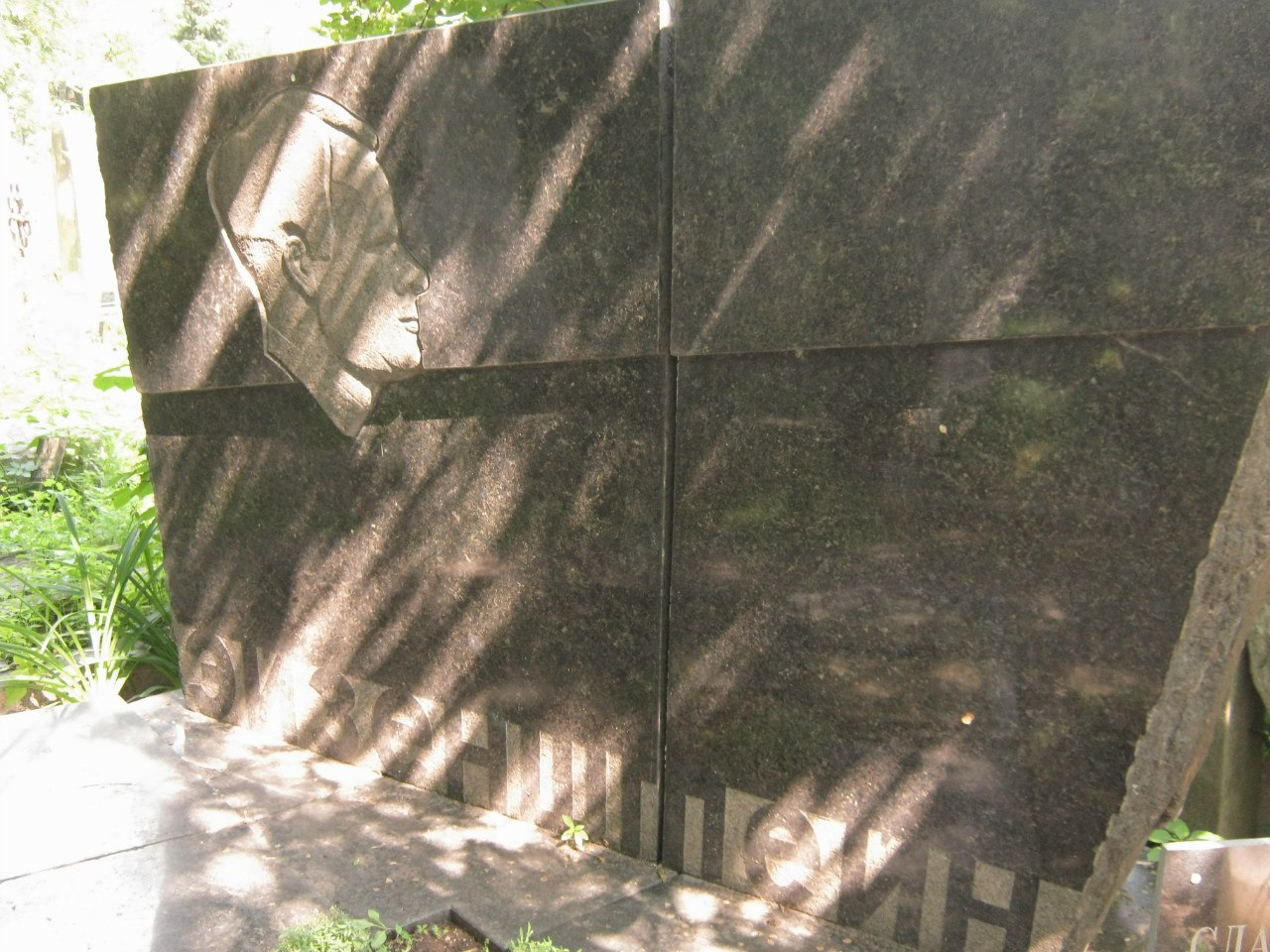
Sergei Eisenstein

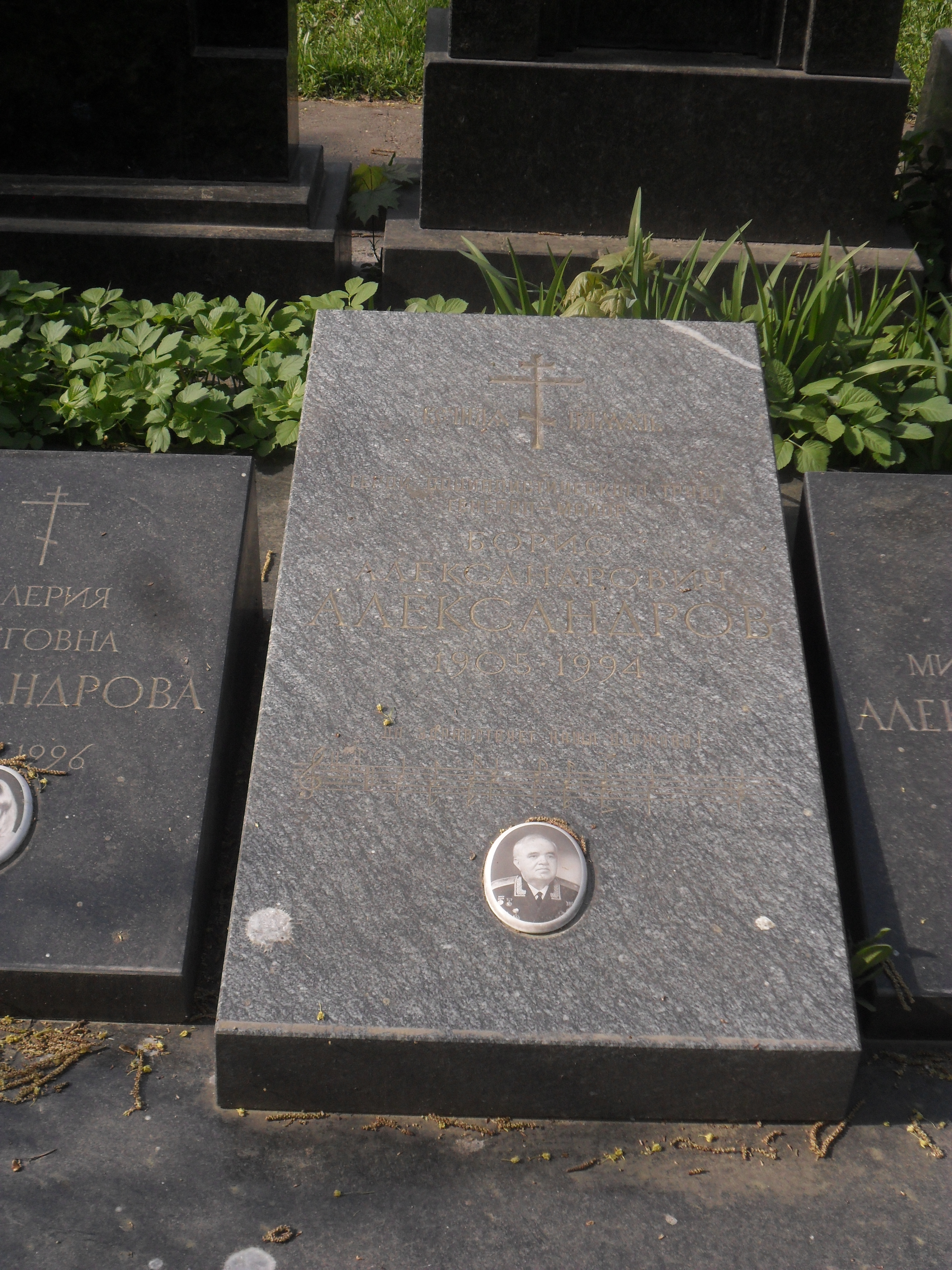
Boris Alexandrovich Alexandrov

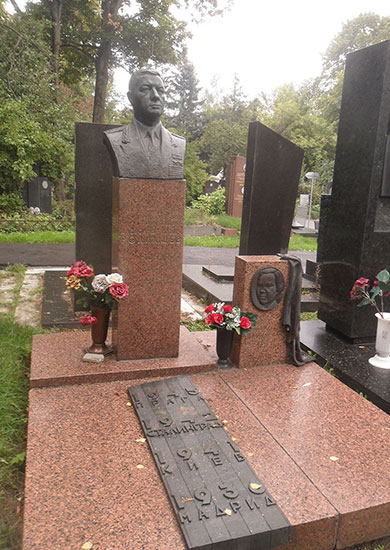
Alexander Rodimtsev

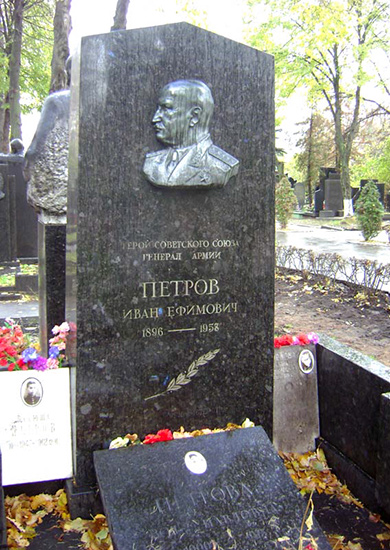
Ivan Yefimovich Petrov

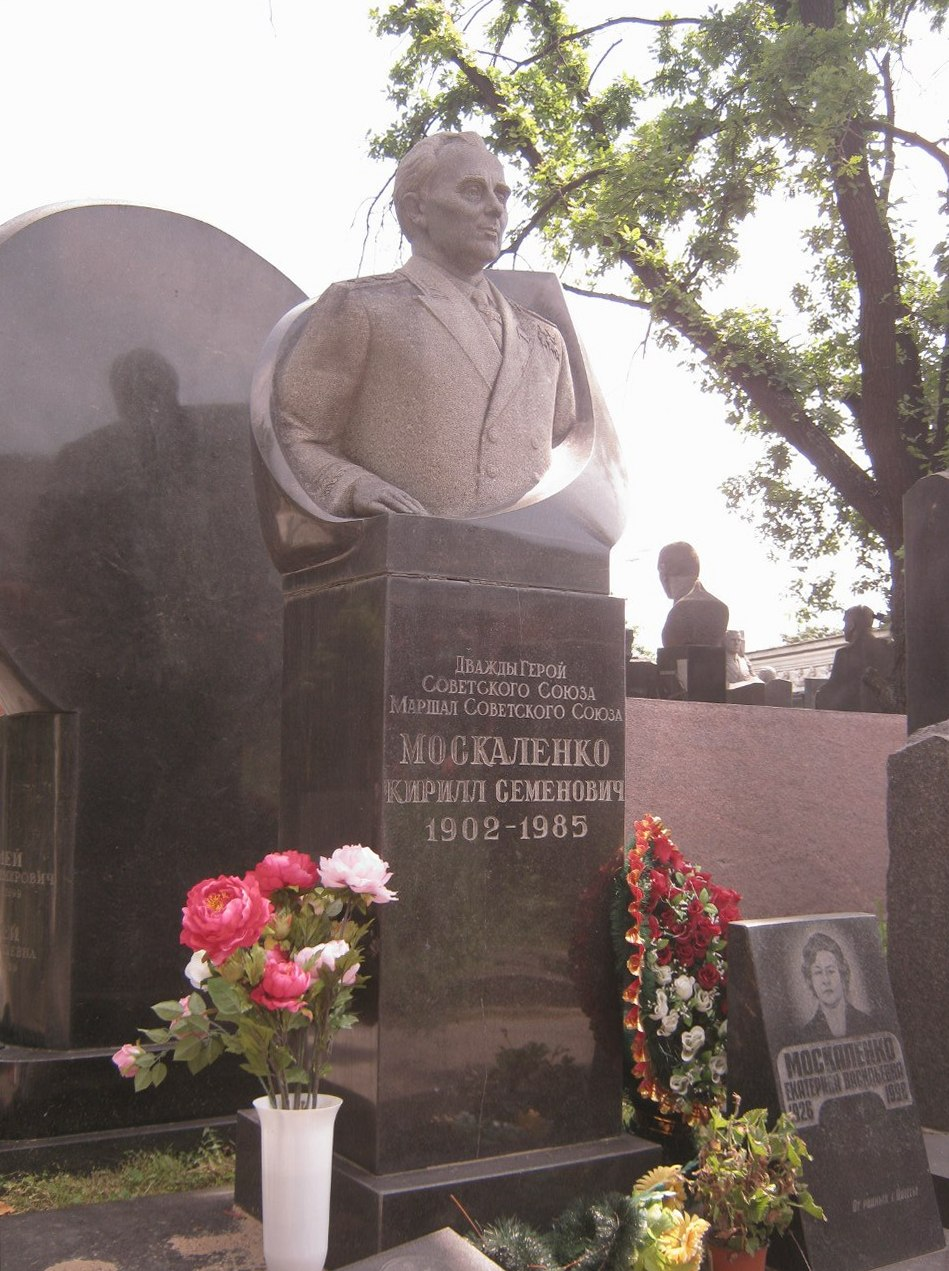
Kirill Moskalenko

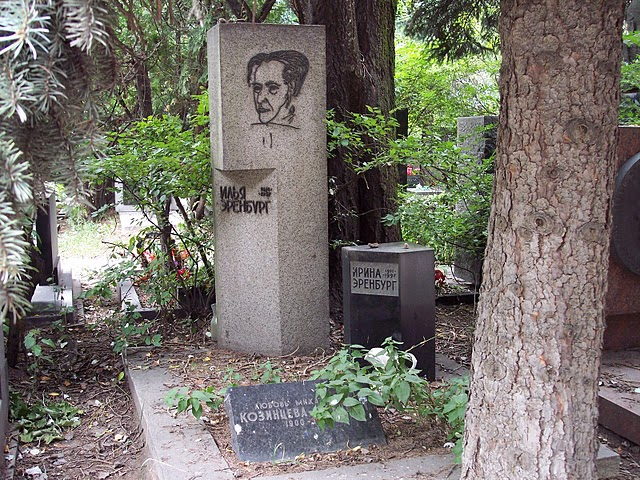
Ilya Ehrenburg

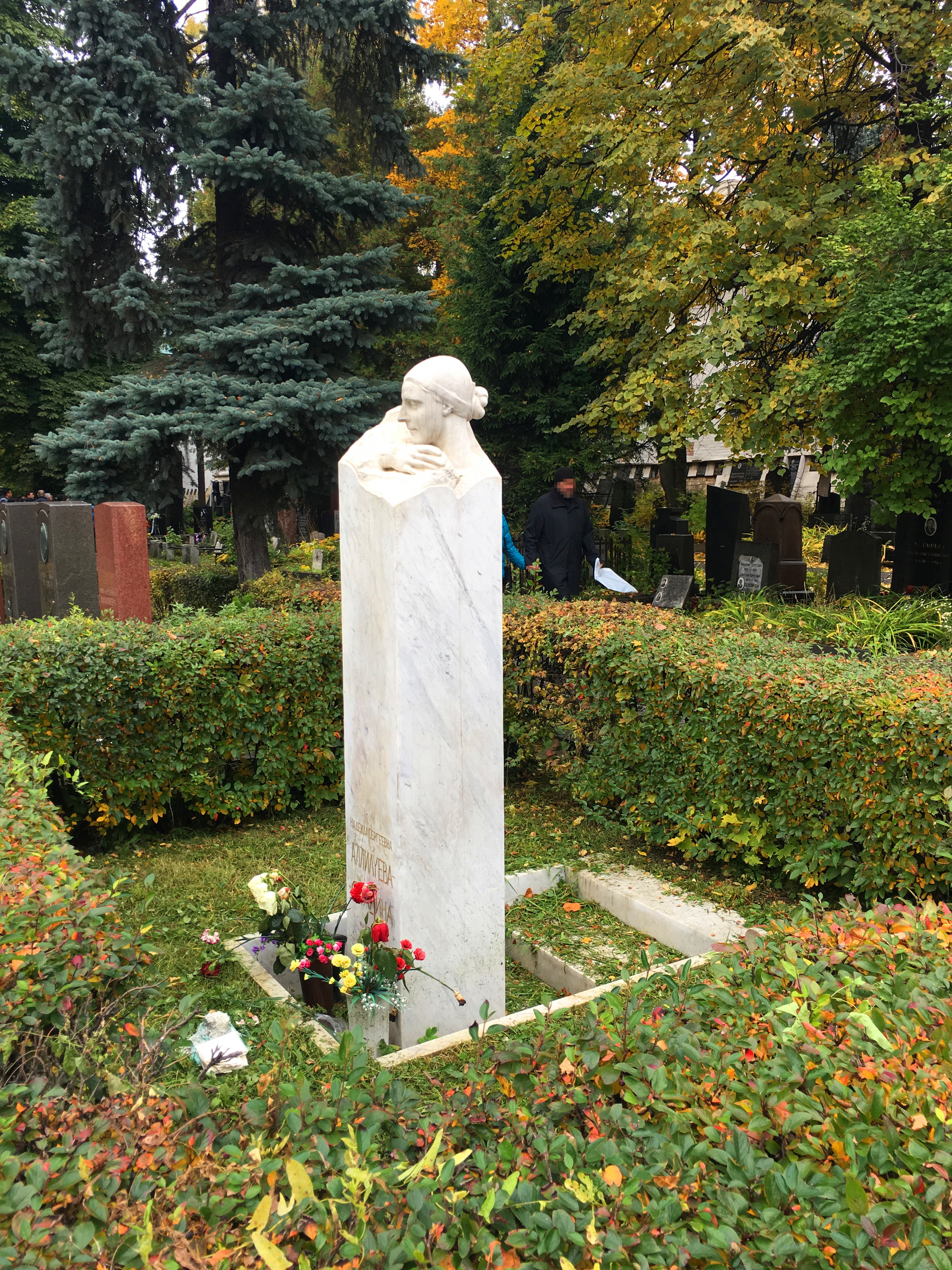
Nadezhda Alliluyeva

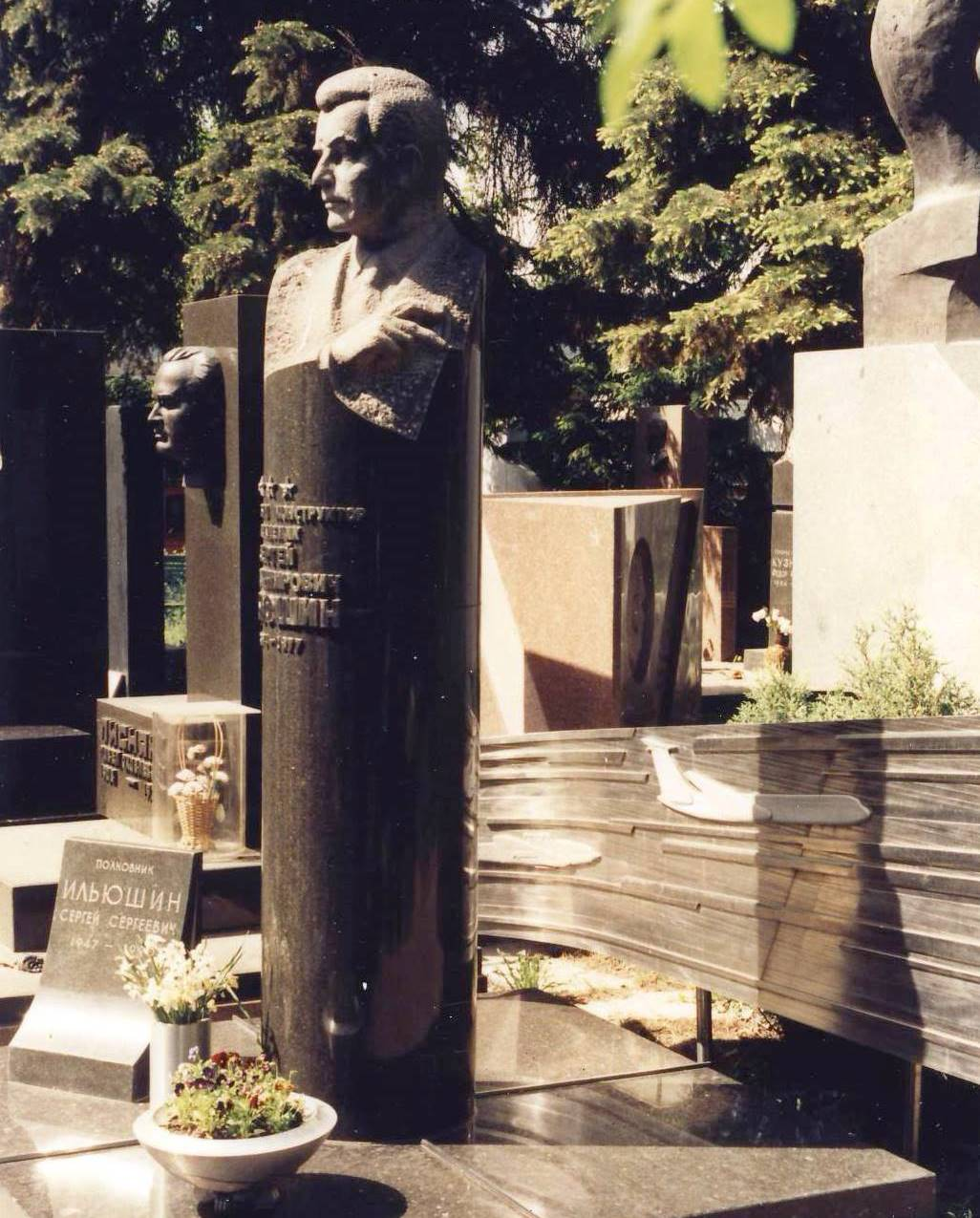
Sergey Ilyushin

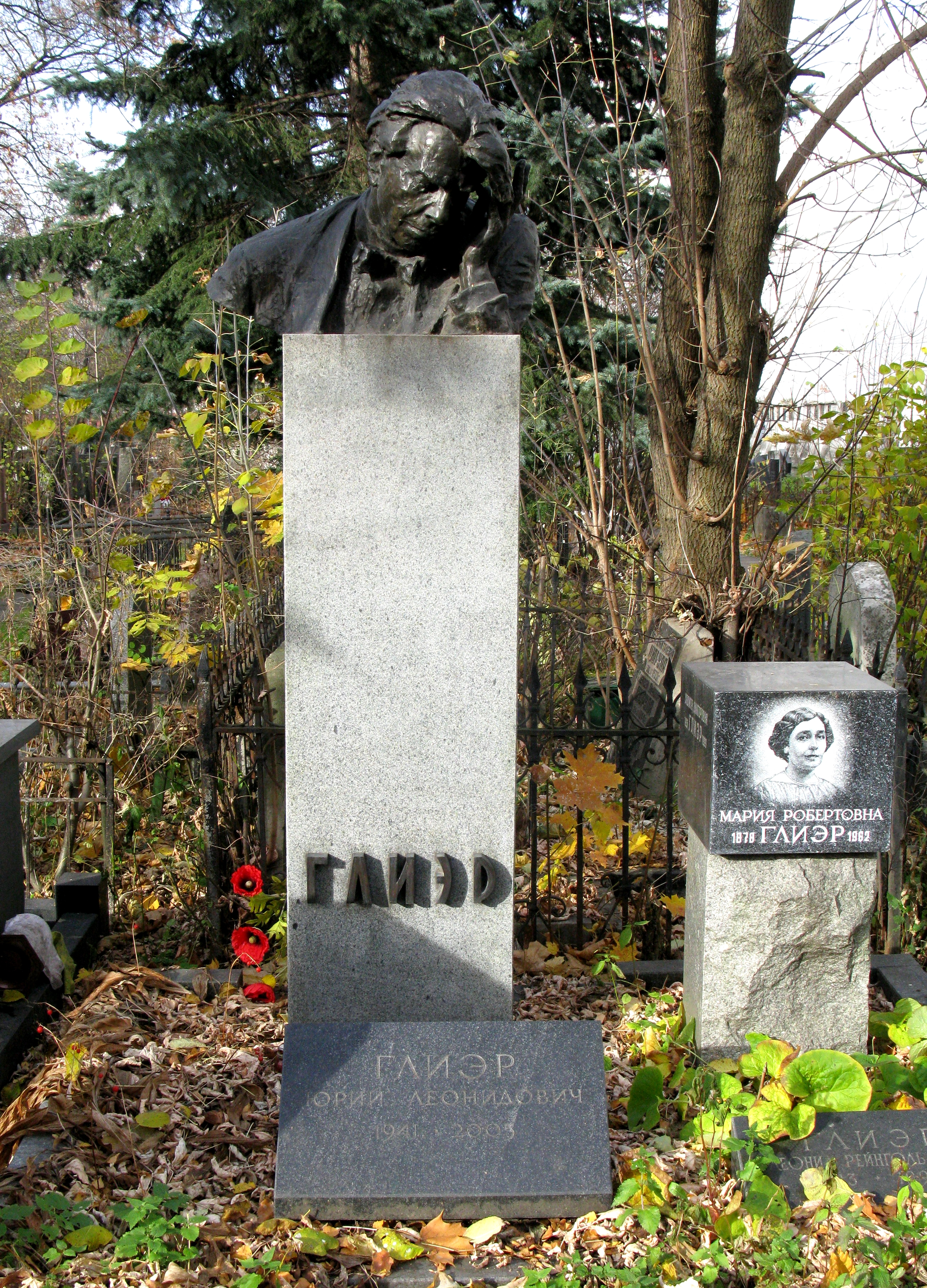
Reinhold Glière

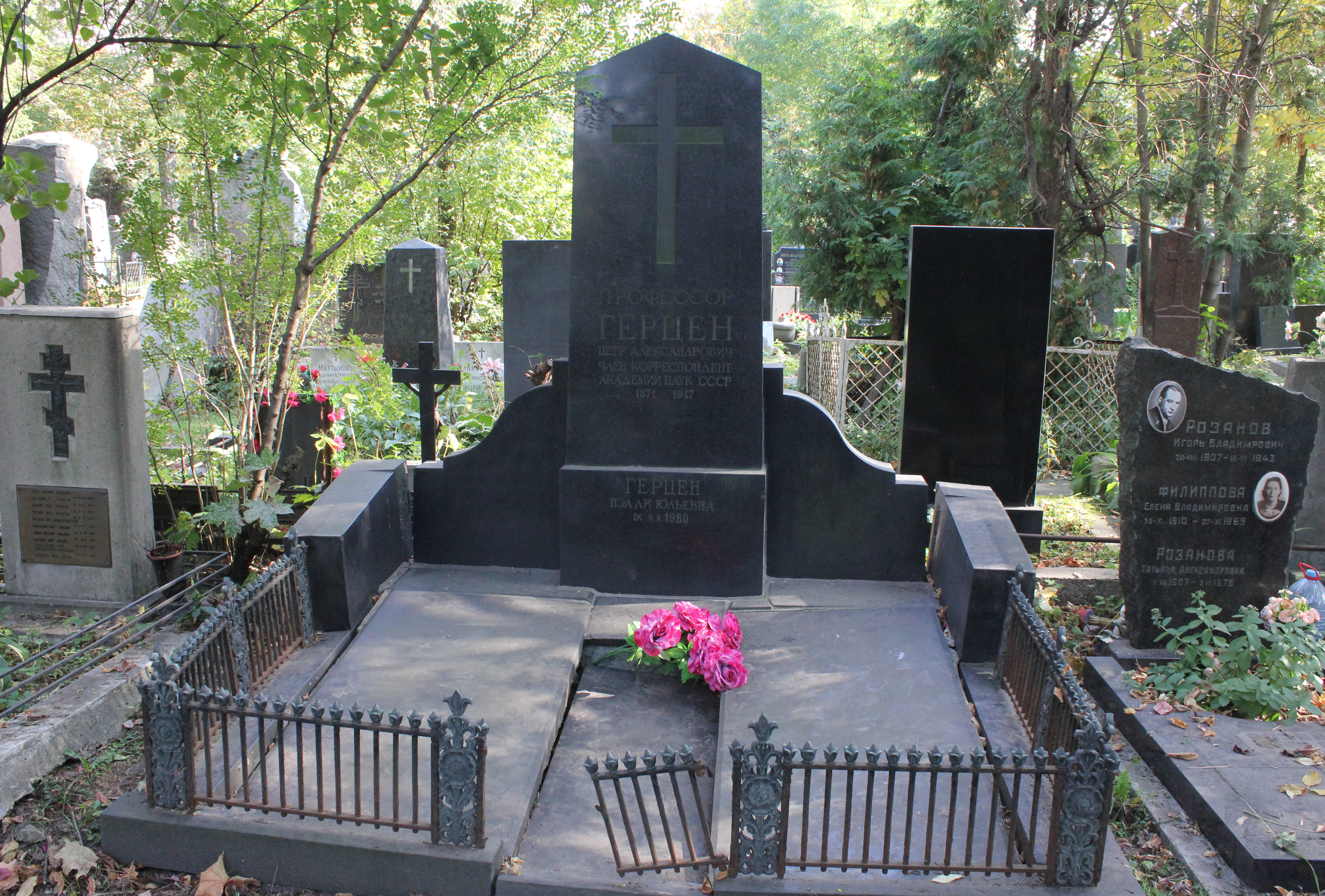
Peter Herzen

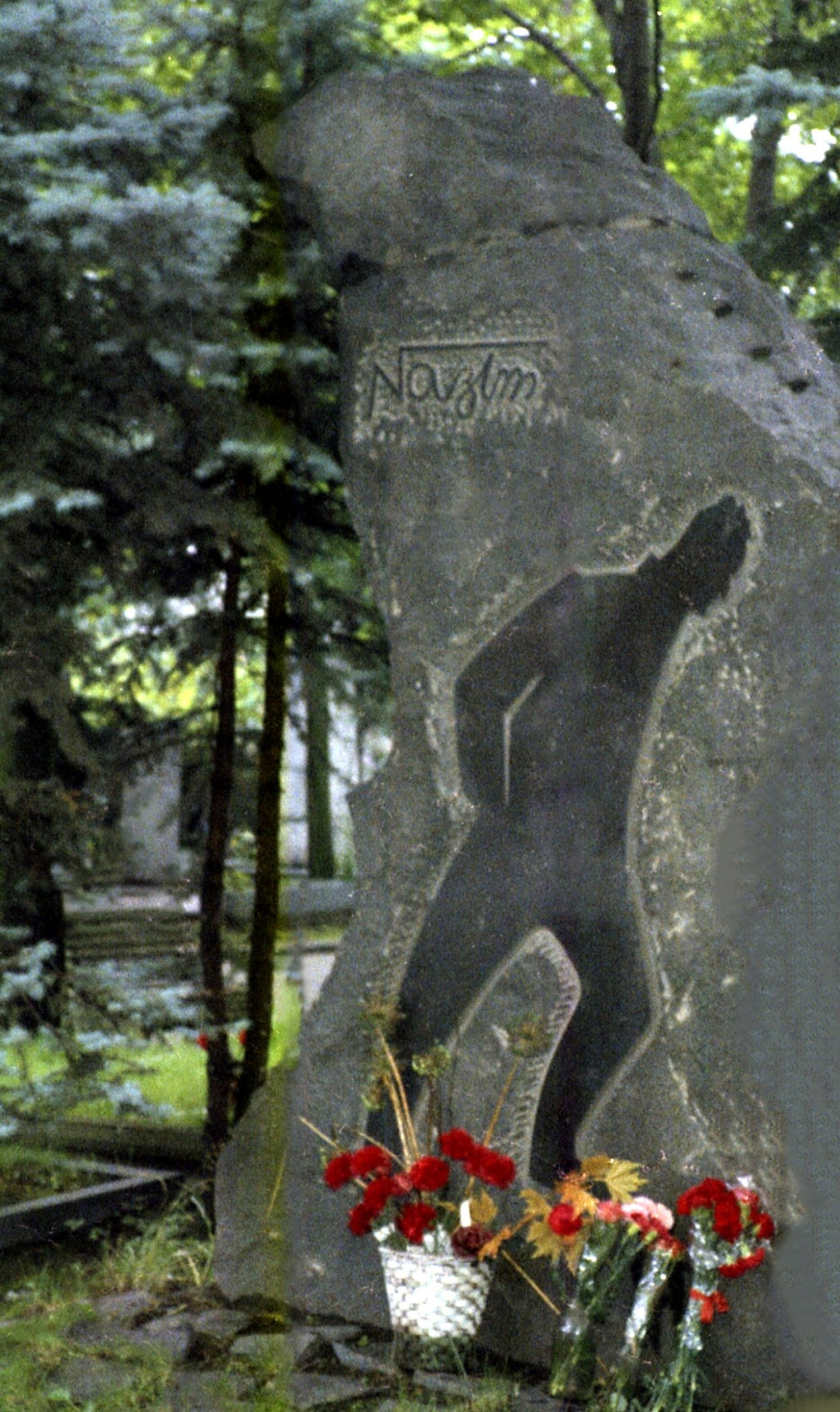
Nâzım Hikmet

Boris Yeltsin

== See also ==
- Burials at the Novodevichy Cemetery
- Sainte-Geneviève-des-Bois Russian Cemetery
- Federal Military Memorial Cemetery
- Kremlin Wall Necropolis
