= Entertainment Complex Bill =

Failed Thai gambling legislation

Entertainment Complex Bill (draft) ร่างพระราชบัญญัติการประกอบธุรกิจสถานบันเทิงครบวงจร

Parliament of Thailand
- Territorial extent: Thailand
- Introduced by: Julapun Amornvivat, a member of Pheu Thai Party
- Status: Withdrawn

The Entertainment Complex Bill (Thai: ร่างพระราชบัญญัติการประกอบธุรกิจสถานบันเทิงครบวงจร) was a proposed law to legalize entertainment complexes, a term for integrated resorts with casinos, in Thailand. The bill was introduced by Deputy Finance Minister Julapun Amornvivat, a member of Pheu Thai Party. The government claimed that the complexes would attract an additional 5–20% of foreign tourists and increase visitor spending from 40,000 to 60,000 baht. Reaction to the bill was mostly negative and it was officially withdrawn on 9 July 2025.

== Background ==
Under the Gambling Act, most forms of gambling are illegal in Thailand. The Thai government expected the legislation to reduce illegal gambling, generate revenue and attract investment. Some Thai-language forums and media outlets had reported growing interest from international gaming operators, as well as debate among citizens about the long-term social impact of legalized gambling.

== Legislative history ==
In September 2024, the Thai government announced it would proceed with plans to introduce casinos, following an online public hearing showing strong support for a "mega entertainment complex" housing a casino.

In October 2024, Deputy Finance Minister Julapun Amornvivat announced the draft bill would be submitted to the Cabinet of Thailand for consideration later in the year. According to a study conducted by the Fiscal Policy Office, establishing entertainment complexes is projected to attract an additional 5–20% of foreign tourists and increase visitor spending from 40,000 to 60,000 baht.

On 13 January 2025, the cabinet approved the draft bill, and it was sent to Parliament for deliberation.

On 27 March 2025, the cabinet approved another draft, imposing entry restrictions on Thai citizens. The draft would require an entry fee of 5,000 baht and proof of at least 50 million baht ($1.47 million) in bank deposits. Additional restrictions included limiting casino usage to 10% of the entertainment complex space. A preliminary reading of the bill was scheduled for 9 April 2025.

Following public opposition and criticism by the Bhumjaithai Party secretary-general Chaichanok Chidchob, the bill was postponed until the next parliamentary session, which began on 2 July 2025. Deliberation of the bill was planned to be held on 9 July. However, on 7 July, the bill was withdrawn in the aftermath of the Thailand–Cambodia phone call leak scandal which led to the suspension of the Prime Minister.

== Provisions ==
The bill would have required entertainment complexes to be operated by Thai-registered corporations. Another proposed amendment would have required that only Thais holding at least 50 million baht would be able to enter casinos.

== Reaction ==
On 9 March 2025 the former leader of the red-shirt faction, Jatuporn Prompan, called for a protest against the bill.

The bill faced opposition particularly from Thai Muslims living in Southern Thailand, in part due to resentment of Thaksin Shinawatra and his former government's policies in the region. The Prachachat Party, a member of the current governing coalition, expressed opposition to the bill.

On 9 April, hundreds protested against the bill in front of Thailand's parliament. Approximately 1,200 demonstrators participated, including those from the Network of Students and People Reforming Thailand and the Anti-Casino alliance.

== See also ==
- Gaming law
