= List of Thai flat horse races =

List of flat horse races, which takes place in Thailand.

== Notable Active Races ==
Held annually.

| Month | Race Name | Racecourse | Dist. (m) | Allowance | Lastest Winner | 2025 Win Prize |
|---|---|---|---|---|---|---|
| January | The Countrybred Trophy | RBSC (Turf) | 1,560 | Countrybred | Louisiana (2025) | 52,080฿ |
| January | The Thoroughbred Trophy | RBSC (Turf) | 1,560 | Thoroughbred | Chaimongkol (2026) | 42,000฿ |
| March | Chakri Cup ^{[a]} | RBSC (Turf) | 1,900 | Countrybred | Louisiana (2025) | 500,000฿ |
| August | Queen Cup | RBSC (Turf) | 1,560 | Countrybred | Wan Heng (2025) | 300,000฿ |
| December | King Cup | RBSC (Turf) | 1,900 | Countrybred | Win The Day (2025) | 500,000฿ |

^{a} Chakri Cup will not be held in 2026.

== General Handicap Races ==
Held every two weeks.

=== Countrybred & New Thoroughbred ===
| Class | Racecourse | Dist. (m) | Min. Rating | Win Prize |
|---|---|---|---|---|
| 1 | RBSC (Turf) | 1,100 - 1,300 | 75 | 68,000฿ |
| 2 | RBSC (Turf) | 1,100 - 1,300 | 65 | 58,000฿ |
| 3 | RBSC (Turf) | 1,100 - 1,300 | 45 | 54,000฿ |
| 4 | RBSC (Turf) | 1,100 - 1,300 | 35 | 54,000฿ |
| 5 | RBSC (Turf) | 1,100 - 1,300 | 20 | 51,000฿ |

=== Thoroughbred ===
| Class | Racecourse | Dist. (m) | Min. Rating | Win Prize |
|---|---|---|---|---|
| 1 | RBSC (Turf) | 1,100 - 1,300 | 70 | 42,000฿ |
| 2 | RBSC (Turf) | 1,100 - 1,300 | 50 | 40,000฿ |
| 3 | RBSC (Turf) | 1,100 - 1,300 | 30 | 38,000฿ |
| 4 | RBSC (Turf) | 1,100 - 1,300 | 20 | 36,000฿ |

== See also ==
- Horse racing in Thailand
