= Playing Cards Act =

Anti-gambling law in Thailand

The Playing Cards Act is a law in Thailand that prohibits individuals from owning more than 120 playing cards that have not been registered by the Excise Department. The current law was passed in 1943, superseding previous acts. The Playing Cards Acts are part of Thailand's strict anti-gambling laws dating back to 1935. To ensure legal possession of playing cards, under Section 12 of the law, a competent official has the power to enter anywhere between sunrise and sunset to conduct a search.

== Playing Cards Factory ==
Despite strict laws governing playing cards, Thailand has a long history of card playing. To meet the demand for cards and to control their availability, under the aegis of the Excise Department of the Thai Finance Ministry, a state enterprise called the Playing Cards Factory was authorised in 1938. The factory produces over 400,000 decks of cards per month. A factory-produced brochure shows the card brands manufactured by the factory. The Playing Cards Factory also serves as a printer for the Thai government.

== See also ==
- Stamp Act
- Thai lottery
