= Chiang Mai racecourse =

Horse racing venue in Thailand

Coordinates: 18°49′35″N 98°58′34″E

Chiang Mai Racecourse
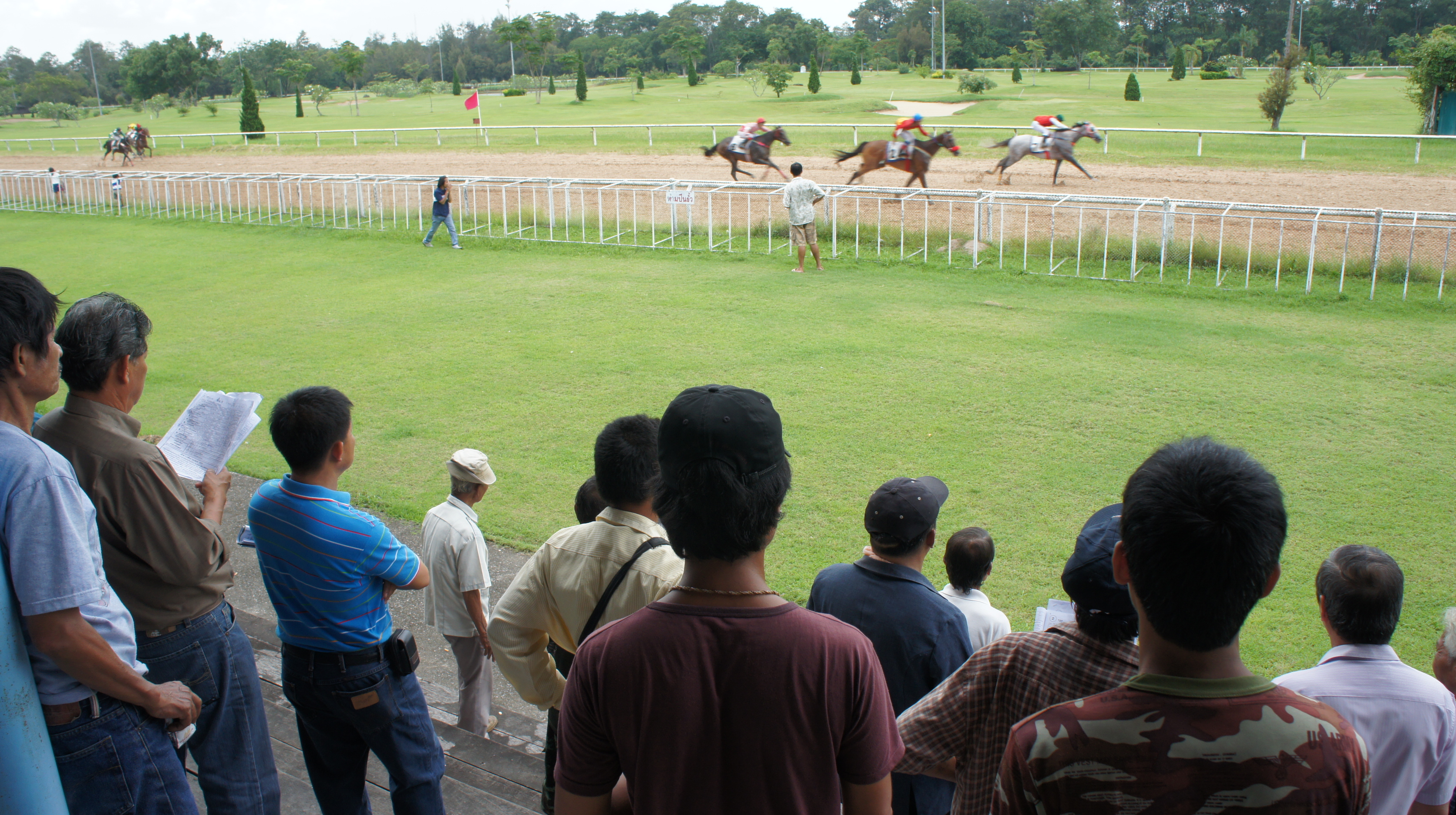
- View from the grandstand
- Interactive map of Chiang Mai Racecourse
- Location: Chang Phueak subdistrict, Mueang Chiang Mai district, Chiang Mai, Thailand
- Operated by: Thai army
- Date opened: 1980s

Chiang Mai racecourse is a horse racing venue in the Mueang Chiang Mai district of Chiang Mai, northern Thailand, about four kilometres north of the old city.

Opened in the 1980s, Chaing Mai racecourse is operated by the Sports Development Centre of the Thai army. As one of the few state-licensed racecourses in Thailand, betting is allowed and is the only kind of gambling, apart from the National Lottery, which is permitted in Thailand.

Horse races take place each Saturday with eight to ten races held on a sand track. Facilities include a grandstand for several hundred spectators with a VIP area, food and drink outlets and betting counters.

In 2020, it was reported that the racecourse may be closed down.

== See also ==
- Horse racing in Thailand
