= Gambling Act (Thailand) =

House of Representatives of Siam
- Long title: Gambling Act BE 2478
- Territorial extent: Thailand
- Enacted by: House of Representatives of Siam
- Enacted: 31 January 1935
- Assented to by: Council of Regency on behalf of King Ananda Mahidol
- Commenced: 1 February 1935
- Status: In force

The Gambling Act BE 2478, commonly referred to as the Gambling Act, is a 1935 Thai Act of Parliament prohibiting most forms of gambling.

== Legislative history ==
The Act was passed by the House of Representatives and assented to by the Council of Regency on behalf of King Ananda Mahidol on 31 January 1935. The Council consisted of Captain Aditya Dibabha, Chaophraya Yommaraj, and General Chaophraya Bijendrayothin. The act came into force following its publication in the Royal Gazette the following day on 1 February 1935.

== Implementation and results ==
As a result of the Gambling Act, gambling in Thailand is heavily restricted. The only forms of legal gambling are an official lottery and state-run horse racing.

On 13 January 2025, the Cabinet of Thailand approved a draft Entertainment Complex Bill to legalize casinos in Thailand. However, the draft bill was later withdrawn.

In addition, lawmakers have discussed the possibility of regulating online gambling as part of broader reforms, though no specific online gaming framework has been passed yet.

== See also ==
- Gambling in Thailand
- Gaming law
