= Thai lottery =

National lottery in Thailand

The Government Lottery Office (GLO)
- สำนักงานสลากกินแบ่งรัฐบาล samnak ngan salak kinbaeng rattaban

Agency overview
- Jurisdiction: Government of Thailand
- Headquarters: 359 Nonthaburi Rd, Tha Sai Subdistrict, Mueang Nonthaburi, Nonthaburi
- Annual budget: 8 billion baht (US$267 million)
- Agency executive: Lt. Col. Nhun Sansanakom, Director-General
- Parent department: Ministry of Finance
- Website: Official website

Thailand's official national lottery (Thai: สลากกินแบ่ง, RTGS: salak kinbaeng) is administered by The Government Lottery Office (GLO). The lottery is drawn on the first and the sixteenth of every month. It is one of only two forms of legalised gambling permitted in Thailand, the other being horse racing in Bangkok.

The lottery in Thailand is hugely popular despite the low odds of winning and the unfavourable payout ratio. The payout ratio for the Thai lottery is 60%, as compared to worldwide averages of 74% for bingo, 81% for horse racing, 89% for slot machines, and 98% for blackjack (basic rules). It is the most popular legal form of gambling in Thailand.

Around 19.2 of 67 million Thais played the government lottery, spending 76 billion baht (US$2.3 billion) in 2014, according to the Family Network Foundation's Secretary Wanchai Boonpracha. Unlike in most countries, where the government licenses and monitors the lottery business, the Thai GLO itself prints and sells the tickets to wholesalers. The strict laws that forbid other gambling activities result in the GLO pocketing 28% of lottery profits for state use.

== GLO charter ==
As the government lottery is a public concern and is a source of state revenue, it was made a state enterprise with a legal identity. The Government Lottery Office Act B.E. 2517 was enacted on 11 September 1974, and became effective on 1 October 1974.

== History ==
Lottery tickets were first issued in the reign (1868–1910) of King Rama V. At that time the king granted the Royal Bodyguard permission to operate a lottery on the occasion of his birthday in 1874. Lotteries were then held intermittently until 1933 when they became a standard government revenue source. Over the years the price of lottery ticket has climbed from one baht to its present official price of 80 baht, although that price has been seldom observed, a surcharge invariably being added.

The military government that took power in May 2014 has made lottery reform one of its priorities. Starting 16 June 2015, the military government has mandated that the price of a lottery ticket will not exceed 80 baht. Starting 1 August 2015, what is commonly called the "jackpot" or bonus first prize of 22 or 30 million baht will be eliminated.

== Demographics ==
In Thailand, women play the lottery more than men by a small margin (52.6 against 47.4%). Lottery gamblers tended to be drawn from working age brackets: 21–30 years (28.2%), 31–40 years (30.2%), and 41–50 years (21.8%). Almost two-thirds of lottery gamblers in Thailand (61.3%) were in low income bracket, earning almost a quarter less than the average monthly salary.

== Play ==
Thai Government Lottery ticket for 1 June 2023 drawing

=== Buying a lottery ticket ===
Since 2015's lottery reforms, it has been illegal to inflate ticker-pair prices above the 80 baht threshold. Though marked-up prices from street vendors are still commonplace, the ongoing crackdown has created significant difficulties to ticket sellers.

=== Lottery tickets ===
There are two types of Thai lottery tickets. The first is the Thai Government Lottery (TGL) ticket. The second is the Thai Charity Lottery (TCL) ticket. These titles are printed at the upper left of each ticket. Aside from the names, the two differ only in their first prize payouts and the amount of tax to be paid on winnings. TGL tickets have a first prize of six million baht, a bonus prize of 30 million*, and are taxed at 0.5%. TCL tickets have a first prize of three million baht, a bonus prize of 22 million*, and are taxed at 1%.

Thai lottery tickets, whether TGL or TCL, are pre-printed, include a number of anti-counterfeiting features,. Each individual ticket is priced at 80 baht, and the ticket pair at 160 baht.

Each ticket in a ticket-pair is identical except for:

1. The pictograms (centre of each ticket)
2. Bar codes (lower right)
3. Unit (Thai: ชุด, RTGS: chut) numbers (2-digit numbers, lower centre. In the examples shown, "09" and "10", and "81", "82"). A "unit" consists of one million 40 baht tickets. Published prize amounts are honoured if the unit sells out. If it does not, prizes are reduced proportionately.

On the verso of each ticket is the schedule of prizes, ancillary information, and conditions.

* The bonus prize was eliminated by the military government after 1 Aug 2015.

=== Draw methodology (simplified) ===
Ten "guests" unaffiliated with the lottery attend each drawing to act as official witnesses. Drawings are held at GLO headquarters on the first and sixteenth of every month. Should either of these dates fall on a holiday, the draw is postponed to the next day. All drawings are televised from 15:00 to 16:00 on the day of the draw. The following procedure is followed:

1. One of the guests is named "Draw Chairman".
2. Guests inspect the equipment, numbers of balls, and search for anomalies.
3. Draw Chairman randomly selects balls (numbers) to initialize each draw machine.
4. Draw Chairman randomly selects a colored ball to determine the order of lesser prize draws. Four colored balls signify different prizes: yellow for 2nd prize, pink for 3rd prize, green for 4th prize, and blue for 5th prize.
5. Six-digit numbers are drawn for the 2nd, 3rd, 4th, and 5th prizes. Total draws: 165.
6. Three-digit numbers are drawn for the 3-digit prize. Total draws: four.
7. A two-digit number is drawn for the 2-digit prize. Total draws: one.
8. A six-digit number is drawn for the first prize. Total draws: one. Also announced are the ±1 special prize numbers.
9. Draw a two-digit number for the Thai Government Lottery bonus prize of 30 million baht*.
10. Draw a two-digit number for the Thai Charity Lottery bonus prize of 22 million baht*.
11. Following the last three draws, officials remove balls from machines to show that all 10 numbers were present.

* The bonus prize was eliminated by the military government after 1 Aug 2015.

=== Prizes ===
The first prize for all six correct numbers is 2 million baht (TGL) or 3 million baht (TCL) per ticket. As tickets are sold in pairs, the published prize amount is doubled. Doubling applies to all prizes except for the 22 million and 30 million baht bonus prizes. There are five-second prizes of 100,000 baht, ten third prizes of 40,000, fifty prizes of 20,000 for fourth, one hundred 10,000 baht prizes for fifth and a 50,000 baht consolation prize for the six-digit winning number plus or minus one.

Official Prizes for Thai Government and Thai Charity Lotteries on 1 August 2014 - 16 July 2015
Prize	Number of Prizes (Draws)	Payout (baht)	Notes
First: Thai Government Lottery (TGL) and Thai Charity Lottery (TCL)	1	2,000,000 x 2 or 3,000,000 x 2	Match 6 digits in first prize draw. Payout for TGL is 2 million; for TCL 3 million
Second	5	100,000 x 2	Match 6 digits in second prize draw
Third	10	40,000 x 2	Match 6 digits in third prize draw
Fourth	50	20,000 x 2	Match 6 digits fourth prize draw
Fifth	100	10,000 x 2	Match 6 digits in fifth prize draw
Special prize (±1)	2	50,000 x 2	Match 6 digits in first prize draw plus or minus 1
Match 3 digits (4 time)	4,000	2,000 x 2	Match 3 digit draw
Match 2 digits (1 time)	10,000	1,000 x 2	Match 2 digit draw
First prize bonus (TGL Group 1)*	1	30,000,000	Match 6 digit draw for first prize and match unit number draw
First prize bonus (TCL Group 2)*	1	22,000,000	Match 6 digit draw for first prize and match unit number draw
* This prize was eliminated by the military government after 1 Aug 2015

Lottery drawings on the first and sixteenth of each month are televised on National Broadcasting Services of Thailand and Spring News starting at 14:30 on Spring News and 15:00 on NBT also simulcast on Radio Thailand Domestic Service. in 2016 the draw also simulcasted on Thairath TV starting from 14:00. Towards the end of the show, just before 16:00, the winning numbers are displayed. Results are posted on The Government Lottery Office website.

Payout examples for Thai Government and Thai Charity Lotteries on 2 June 2015
Drawing	Number drawn	Unit number drawn	Ticket type	Prize (baht)	Tax (%)
1st prize	388881	12	TGL	4,000,000 (2M x 2)	0.5
1st prize	388881	29	TGL	32,000,000 (2M + 30M)	0.5
1st prize	388881	60	TCL	6,000,000 (3M x 2)	1
1st prize	388881	62	TCL	24,000,000 (2M + 22M)	0.5
1st prize ±1	388880	N/A	TGL	50,000	0.5
1st prize ±1	388882	N/A	TCL	50,000	1
3rd prize	726055	N/A	TGL	40,000	0.5
3rd prize	726055	N/A	TCL	40,000	1

=== Claiming a prize ===
Prizes must be claimed within two years of the draw date. Prizes of less than 20,000 baht are paid in cash by a lottery retail vendor. A one or two percent commission is deducted from gross winnings. For prizes of more than 20,000 baht, the winning ticket and its holder must be present in person at the government lottery office in Nonthaburi where a cheque will be issued. All winnings are subject to tax: 0.50% on the Thai Government Lottery and 1% on the Thai Charity Lottery.

== Distribution of revenues ==
According to the act creating the GLO, the proceeds received by the Government Lottery Office from the sale of lottery tickets shall be allocated as follows:

1. 60% as prizes.
2. not less than 28% as state revenue.
3. not exceeding 12% as expenditure on administration inclusive cost of sales: 9% for cost of sales and 3% for administrative costs.

=== Charities supported ===
The lottery generates four billion baht a year for the Thai Red Cross, charities, community projects, and scholarships, and keeps many people, often disabled, employed as ticket sellers.

== GLO international affiliations ==
The GLO is a member of the World Lottery Association (WLA) and of the Asia Pacific Lottery Association (APLA).

== Underground lotteries ==
Underground lottery or huaytaidin (Thai: หวยใต้ดิน, RTGS: Huai Tai din) dealers around the country operate lotteries estimated at four to five times the size of the official lottery, according to Associate Professor Dr. Sungsidh Piriyarangsan, Dean of the College of Social Innovation RSU. Underground lotteries are based on numbers drawn in the official lottery. These dealers offer better prizes, credit purchases, and more betting options. As a small underground lottery business can be started with just a notebook and a pen, they are ubiquitous, and an effective crackdown is impossible.

So prevalent are Thai underground lotteries, they flourish even in Thai expatriate communities abroad.

== See also ==
- Gambling in Thailand
