= Chonburi =

City in Thailand

Chonburi ชลบุรี
- Town
- เทศบาลเมืองชลบุรี
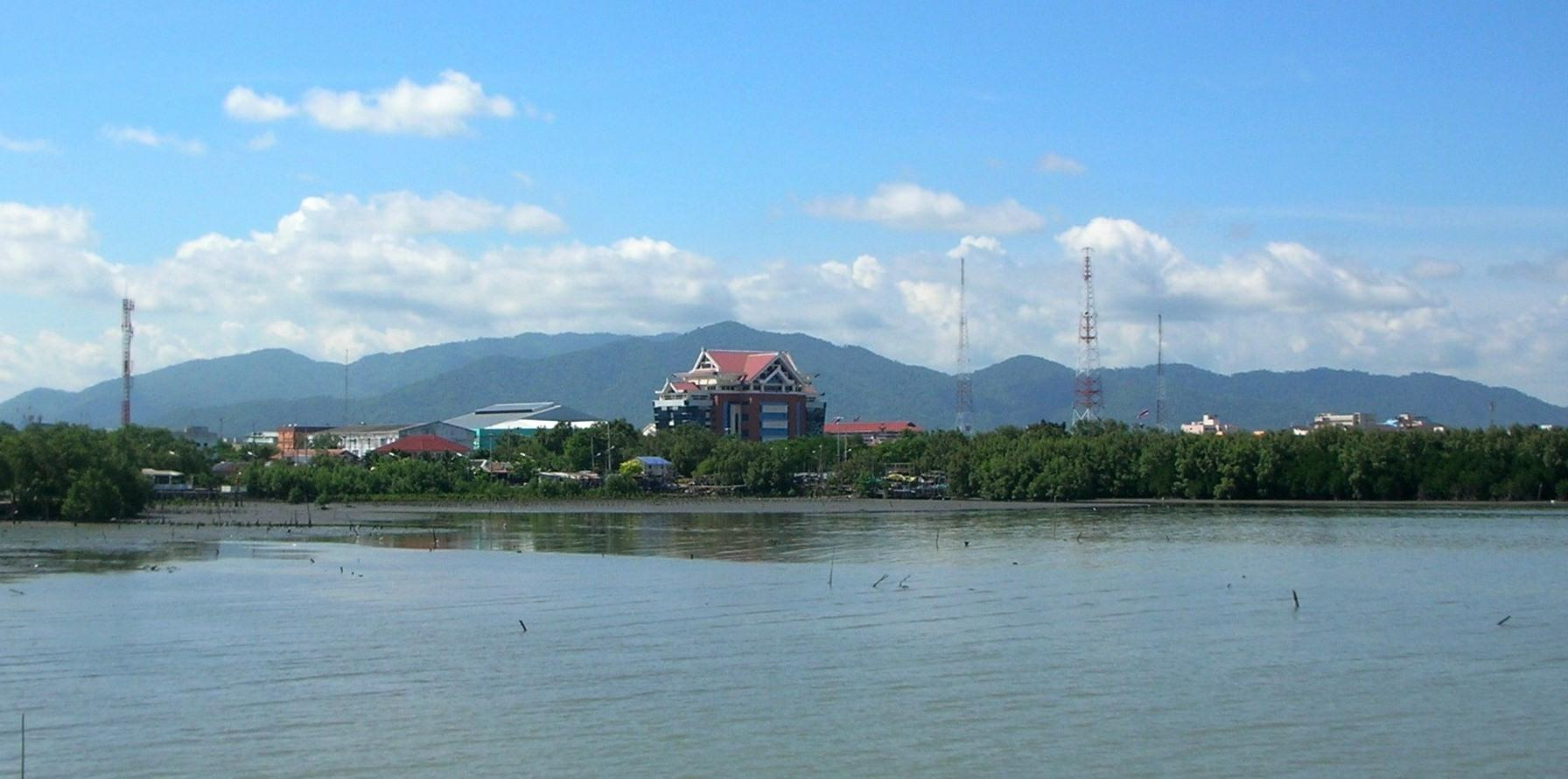
- The Khao Khiao Massif rising behind Chonburi town

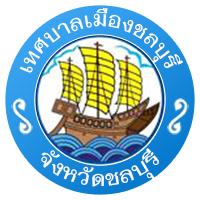
- Seal

- Location in Thailand
- Coordinates: 13°21′40″N 100°59′6″E
- Country: Thailand
- Province: Chonburi Province
- District: Mueang Chonburi

Government
  - Mayor: Decho Kongchayasukkawat

Area
  - Town: 3.5 km^{2} (1.4 sq mi)
  - Urban: 228.8 km^{2} (88.3 sq mi)
- Elevation: 9 m (30 ft)

Population (2017)
  - Town: 27,815
  - Rank: 7th in Thailand
  - Urban: 342,959
- Time zone: UTC+7 (ICT)
- Postcode: 20000
- Area code: (+66) 38
- Geocode: 2099
- Website: chonburicity.go.th

Chonburi (Thai: ชลบุรี, RTGS: Chon Buri, IAST: jalapurī, pronounced [tɕ͡ʰōn bù.rīː]) is the capital of Chonburi Province and, as part of the district Mueang Chonburi, the seventh-largest city in Thailand. It is about 100 km southeast of Bangkok, on the coast of the Gulf of Thailand, and has an urban population of 342,959. Its name means 'city of water'.

Chonburi, along with the urban areas of Si Racha and Pattaya, forms a conurbation known as the Pattaya-Chonburi Metropolitan Area, which has a total population of 999,092.

Chonburi town has had town (thesaban mueang) status since 1935 and makes up only a small part of the current city-scape.

== Climate ==
Chonburi has a tropical savanna climate (Köppen climate classification Aw). Winters are fairly dry and very warm. Temperatures rise until April, which is hot with the average daily maximum at 35.2 °C (95.4 °F). The monsoon season runs from May through October, with heavy rain and somewhat cooler temperatures during the day, although nights remain warm.

Climate data for Chonburi (1991–2020, extremes 1951-present)
Month	Jan	Feb	Mar	Apr	May	Jun	Jul	Aug	Sep	Oct	Nov	Dec	Year
Record high °C (°F)	37.3 (99.1)	37.6 (99.7)	38.7 (101.7)	39.9 (103.8)	39.3 (102.7)	36.8 (98.2)	37.2 (99.0)	36.2 (97.2)	35.9 (96.6)	36.5 (97.7)	37.9 (100.2)	36.9 (98.4)	39.9 (103.8)
Mean daily maximum °C (°F)	32.6 (90.7)	33.2 (91.8)	34.2 (93.6)	35.1 (95.2)	34.7 (94.5)	34.0 (93.2)	33.4 (92.1)	33.2 (91.8)	32.9 (91.2)	33.0 (91.4)	33.3 (91.9)	32.7 (90.9)	33.5 (92.4)
Daily mean °C (°F)	27.3 (81.1)	28.3 (82.9)	29.4 (84.9)	30.4 (86.7)	30.2 (86.4)	29.9 (85.8)	29.5 (85.1)	29.3 (84.7)	28.7 (83.7)	28.3 (82.9)	28.2 (82.8)	27.2 (81.0)	28.9 (84.0)
Mean daily minimum °C (°F)	23.0 (73.4)	24.4 (75.9)	25.9 (78.6)	26.9 (80.4)	27.0 (80.6)	26.8 (80.2)	26.5 (79.7)	26.3 (79.3)	25.6 (78.1)	25.0 (77.0)	24.1 (75.4)	22.7 (72.9)	25.3 (77.6)
Record low °C (°F)	9.9 (49.8)	16.0 (60.8)	14.0 (57.2)	18.1 (64.6)	22.1 (71.8)	20.8 (69.4)	21.0 (69.8)	21.3 (70.3)	21.0 (69.8)	18.9 (66.0)	14.2 (57.6)	12.0 (53.6)	9.9 (49.8)
Average precipitation mm (inches)	17.6 (0.69)	14.7 (0.58)	55.6 (2.19)	79.9 (3.15)	156.3 (6.15)	143.4 (5.65)	143.9 (5.67)	159.7 (6.29)	279.8 (11.02)	197.2 (7.76)	37.4 (1.47)	7.2 (0.28)	1,292.7 (50.89)
Average precipitation days (≥ 1.0 mm)	1.4	1.5	4.1	5.7	11.2	11.3	11.4	12.2	16.3	12.9	3.3	0.8	92.1
Average relative humidity (%)	66.8	69.6	71.7	71.6	73.9	74.1	74.4	75.3	78.7	78.1	69.1	64.2	72.3
Average dew point °C (°F)	20.1 (68.2)	21.8 (71.2)	23.4 (74.1)	24.4 (75.9)	24.8 (76.6)	24.5 (76.1)	24.2 (75.6)	24.2 (75.6)	24.4 (75.9)	23.8 (74.8)	21.6 (70.9)	19.4 (66.9)	23.1 (73.6)
Mean monthly sunshine hours	263.5	245.8	238.7	240.0	195.3	153.0	158.1	114.7	108.0	145.7	222.0	260.4	2,345.2
Mean daily sunshine hours	8.5	8.7	7.7	8.0	6.3	5.1	5.1	3.7	3.6	4.7	7.4	8.4	6.4
Source 1: World Meteorological Organization
Source 2: Office of Water Management and Hydrology, Royal Irrigation Department (sun 1981–2010) (extremes)

== Transportation ==
The main road through Chonburi is Thailand Route 3, also known as Sukhumvit Road. To the northwest it connects to Bangkok and to south it connects to Rayong, Chanthaburi, and Trat. Route 344 leads east to Klaeng, also on Route 3. Route 7 runs parallel to Route 3 but bypasses the densely populated coastal area, connecting to the beach resort city of Pattaya.

== Tourism ==
A number of beaches and Khao Sam Muk hill by the Bangkok Bay seashore are important tourist attractions in Chonburi city.

As Thailand moves to legalize gambling, Chonburi is expected to be one of the locations of an integrated resort.

== Military ==
Unithai Shipyard will serve as the main facility to repair United States Navy ships in the Thailand area.

== Notable people ==
- Wasan Charam (born 1989), footballer
- Kantadhee Kusiri (born 1993), racing driver
- Dechapol Puavaranukroh (born 1997), World Champion badminton player
- Kunlavut Vitidsarn (born 2001), badminton player
