= Sra Pathum Airfield =

Thailand's first and former airfield

- สนามบินสระปทุม
- Royal Bangkok Sports Club, Pathum Wan, Bangkok, Thailand; Near Bangkok in Thailand
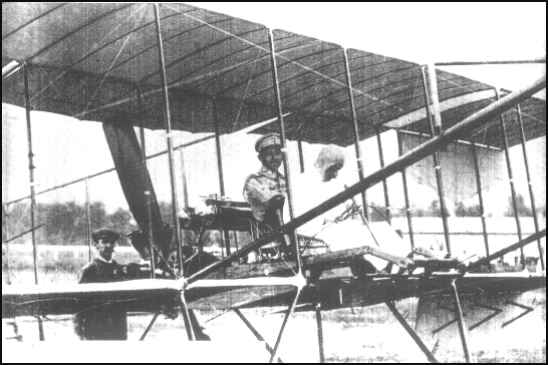
- Prince Chakrabongse, Chief of the Army General Staff, sits in the airplane ‘Henry Farman IV’ with the Belgian pilot Charles Van Den Born at Bangkok, February 6, 1911

Site information
- Type: Military airfield
- Owner: Thai Government
- Operator: Royal Thai Air Force (initially operated by the Army)
- Controlled by: Royal Thai Air Force
- Open to the public: No
- Condition: Dismantled

Location
- Location of Sra Pathum Airfield
- Coordinates: 13°44′20″N 100°32′15″E

Site history
- Built: 1911
- Built for: Royal Thai Army Air Corps (later the Royal Thai Air Force)
- In use: March 8, 1914
- Fate: Dismantled, racing operations resumed.
- Demolished: 1914
- Events: First airport in Thailand, hosting the first aircraft demonstration in 1911

Airfield information
- Elevation: 10 feet (3 m) (approx.) AMSL

Sra Pathum Airfield is the first airport in Thailand, established in 1911 at the site of Sra Pathum Racecourse in Bangkok, Thailand. On March 8, 1914, it was closed due to poor weather conditions and its proximity to Bangkok.

== History ==
Seven years after Orville Wright’s invention, foreigners in Bangkok collaborated to bring an aircraft demonstration to Thailand for the first time ever, and contacted Belgian pilot Charles Van Den Born to bring the Henry Farman IV. While several other aviators were invited, only Charles had shown up.

At the time, most of Bangkok was marshy, flood-prone, and used for rice paddies. By chance, Karl Offer, a coordinator of Societe d’Aviation Extreme Oriente, was also a member of the Royal Bangkok Sports Club. He requested that the central racetrack should be used for the demonstration, as it had solid ground suitable to support the weight of the aircraft. Soon afterwards, the club constructed 15 new entrances and 4 bridges across surrounding moats, and also a temporary hangar in the golf course. On the evening of February 3, 1911, Minister of Defense General Phichai Srisuradej, King Vajiravudh (Rama VI), and other Royal Family members visited the racecourse to watch the demonstration, which made headlines in the Bangkok Times. People who wanted to experience Bangkok from the sky could pay 50 baht for the experience, and the first foreigner to see Bangkok from above was Mr. F. Bopp. The public demonstration was supposed to end on February 6, however, it was extended for three extra days due to public demand.

=== Establishment ===
King Rama VI was impressed by the air show, and on January 13, 1912, military officers Major Luang Sakdi Sanlayawut, Captain Luang Arwut Sikikorn and First Lieutenant Tip Ketuthat were sent to attend aviation courses in France. By November 2, 1913, the three military officers returned with a French mechanic, 3 Breguet planes and 4 Nieuport monoplanes which the Thai government had ordered. They used a route through Russia and Japan, experiencing other flight demonstrations along the way. One Breguet plane was donated by Chao Phraya Aphai Pubet, a wealthy Siamese governor, bringing the number to 8.

In late 1913, the first test flight was made, and the Thai aeronautical engineering and flight training was established by the three officers. A temporary hangar was constructed behind the Pathumwan Police Patrol School. On December 19, the officers conducted the first flight tests on the aircraft, and by January 13, an aviation unit was formed through the Siamese Army. It was equipped with the 8 planes.

== Unsuitable conditions ==
In 1914, the Ministry of Defense found the location unsuitable due to the fact that Sra Pathum Airfield was located in a flood-prone area when it rained during Monsoon, and also being close to the center of Bangkok City which restrained limitations. A new location was chosen by Prince Chakrabongse, 23 kilometers north of Bangkok, which could only be accessed by railways at the time.

=== Closure ===
With the completion of Don Mueang Airport, the aviation unit was transferred, and the Sra Pathum Racecourse run by the Royal Bangkok Sports Club continued operations as-per-usual. On March 8, 1914, the last flight took place, and Sra Pathum Airfield officially closed. The military flight took off from Sra Pathum Airport and landed at Don Mueang Airport. The aviation unit later evolved into the Royal Thai Air Force.

== Legacy ==
On 31 May 1994, January 13 was designated as National Aviation Day by the Thai cabinet, following a proposal made by the Foundation for the Conservation and Development of Thai Aircraft under Royal Patronage. The foundation was aimed to honor King Rama VI for his role in establishing aviation in Thailand. The celebrations began in 1995.

The foundation was established in 1998 to preserve and promote the history of aviation in Thailand. It operates a museum and preserve aircraft such as the T-28 Trojan (serial 138173), which was formerly used by the Royal Thai Air Force. It was built by the North American Aviation and originally used by the United States Air Force, which was later restored airworthy from its previous civilian life.

== See also ==
- Old Chiang Rai Airport - The fourth airport in Thailand.
- Lampang Airport - The third airport in Thailand.
- Don Mueang Airport - The second airport (that replaced Sra Pathum) in Thailand.
