= Wasan Charam =

Thai footballer (born 1989)

Personal information
- Full name: Wasan Thanapat(Charam)
- Date of birth: April 10, 1989 (age 37)
- Place of birth: Chonburi, Thailand
- Height: 1.67 m (5 ft 5 1/2 in)
- Position: Midfielder

Team information
- Current team: Pattaya United
- Number: 23

Senior career*
Years	Team	Apps	(Gls)
2010–	Pattaya United	4	(1)
- * Club domestic league appearances and goals

Wasan Thanapat (Charam) (Thai: วสันต์ ธนภัธร์ (ชะรัมย์)) is a Thai footballer. Since 2010, he has played for the Thai Premier League side, Pattaya United.

== See also ==
- Football in Thailand
- List of football clubs in Thailand
