= Royal Bangkok Sports Club =

Sports club in Bangkok, Thailand

Coordinates: 13°44′20″N 100°32′10″E

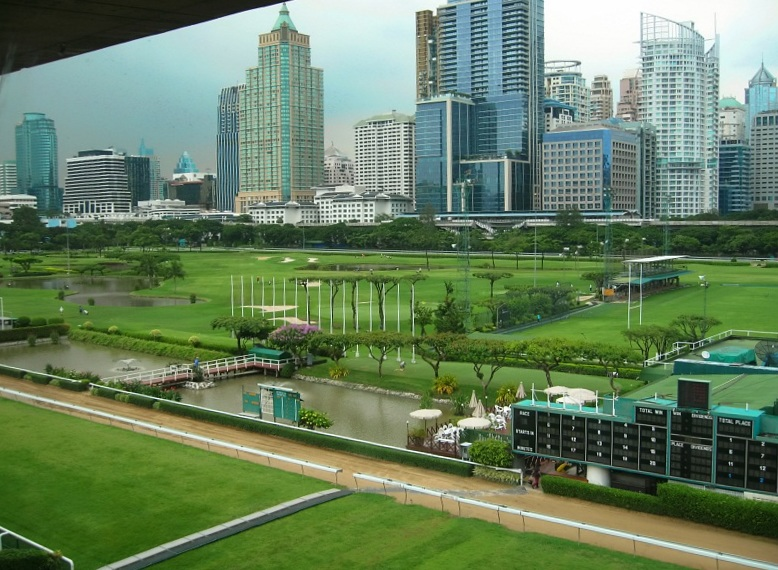
- View from the grandstand, with Ratchadamri skyscrapers in the background
- Predecessor: Bangkok Gymkhana Club
- Formation: 6 September 1901; 125 years ago
- Founder: Alexander Olarovsky
- Type: Association
- Location: Pathum Wan, Bangkok
- Services: Exclusive sports club
- Members: Approx. 12,500
- Chairman: Pol.Gen.Visanu Prasattongosoth
- 1st Vice Chairman: Sarut Ruttanaporn
- 2nd Vice Chairman: Ronald Arthur Hudon
- Website: www.rbsc.org

The Royal Bangkok Sports Club (RBSC, Thai: ราชกรีฑาสโมสร (Note: pronounced [râːt.tɕʰa.krīː.tʰāː.sa.mōː.sɔ̌ːn], RTGS: Ratchakritha Samoson)) is an exclusive sports club in Bangkok, Thailand, best known to the public for its horse racing venue. Founded in 1901, it was the first racecourse in the country and one of the oldest golf courses. Originally serving Western expatriates and Thai aristocrats, the club was at the centre of development in the introduction of modern sport to the country during the early 20th century. The club has since maintained its exclusivity, and has a reputation as a domain of high society.

== History ==
The RBSC's history dates to 1890, when English expatriate Franklin Hurst made a request to Prince Devawongse Varoprakar, the Foreign Minister, for permission to establish a club, with a racecourse and sports field, in Bangkok. Permission was granted in 1892, along with a lease of land in the Sa Pathum area (now Pathum Wan District) from the government. The original club, known as the Bangkok Gymkhana Club, remained operational for less than a decade.

In 1901, a group of expatriates and high-ranking Thais, led by Russian Consul-General Alexander Olarovsky, submitted a request to establish a new club, "for the purpose of improving the standard of horse breeding and various other field sports." Royal assent was granted by King Chulalongkorn, and the Royal Bangkok Sports Club was established by royal charter on 6 September 1901. It took over assets of the Gymkhana Club and secured use of the racecourse land. Olarovsky became the club's first chairman.

Horse racing began at the club in January 1903. Other sports were gradually introduced, including cricket in 1905, golf (the second oldest course in Thailand) in 1906, rugby in 1907 and squash in 1909. The RBSC served as a central venue where the Thai elite adopted modern, Western sports, building an image of Thais as a civilized people as part of the country's modernization under Chulalongkorn's reign.

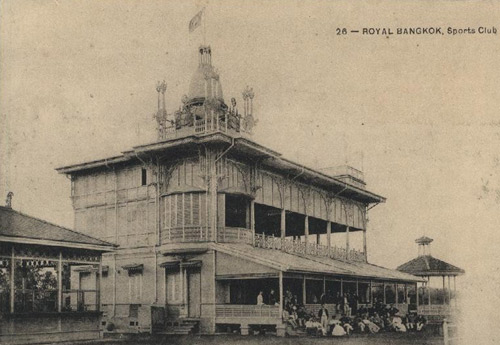
The clubhouse in around 1910

In 1911, the club served as the site of an aviation meet, where Belgian aviator Charles Van den Born made the first demonstration of an aeroplane flight in Siam (as Thailand was then known). From 1913 to 1914 part of the club's grounds served as the country's first airfield, known as Sa Pathum Airfield. It was used by the country's first Army pilots, before permanent facilities were established at Don Mueang Airport.

In 1916, as a result of a dispute over funding being diverted to other sports at the expense of horse racing prize money, a group of Thai members split off from the RBSC to form the Royal Turf Club of Thailand. The new club largely catered to Thai members, while the RBSC continued to remain very Western-oriented, leading them to become known as Sanam Thai (the "Thai racecourse") and Sanam Farang ("Farang racecourse"). The RBSC continued to be chaired by Western expatriates until 1941, when the Japanese Army occupied the club in the course of World War II and Prince Rajadabhisek Sonakul became the first Thai chairman.

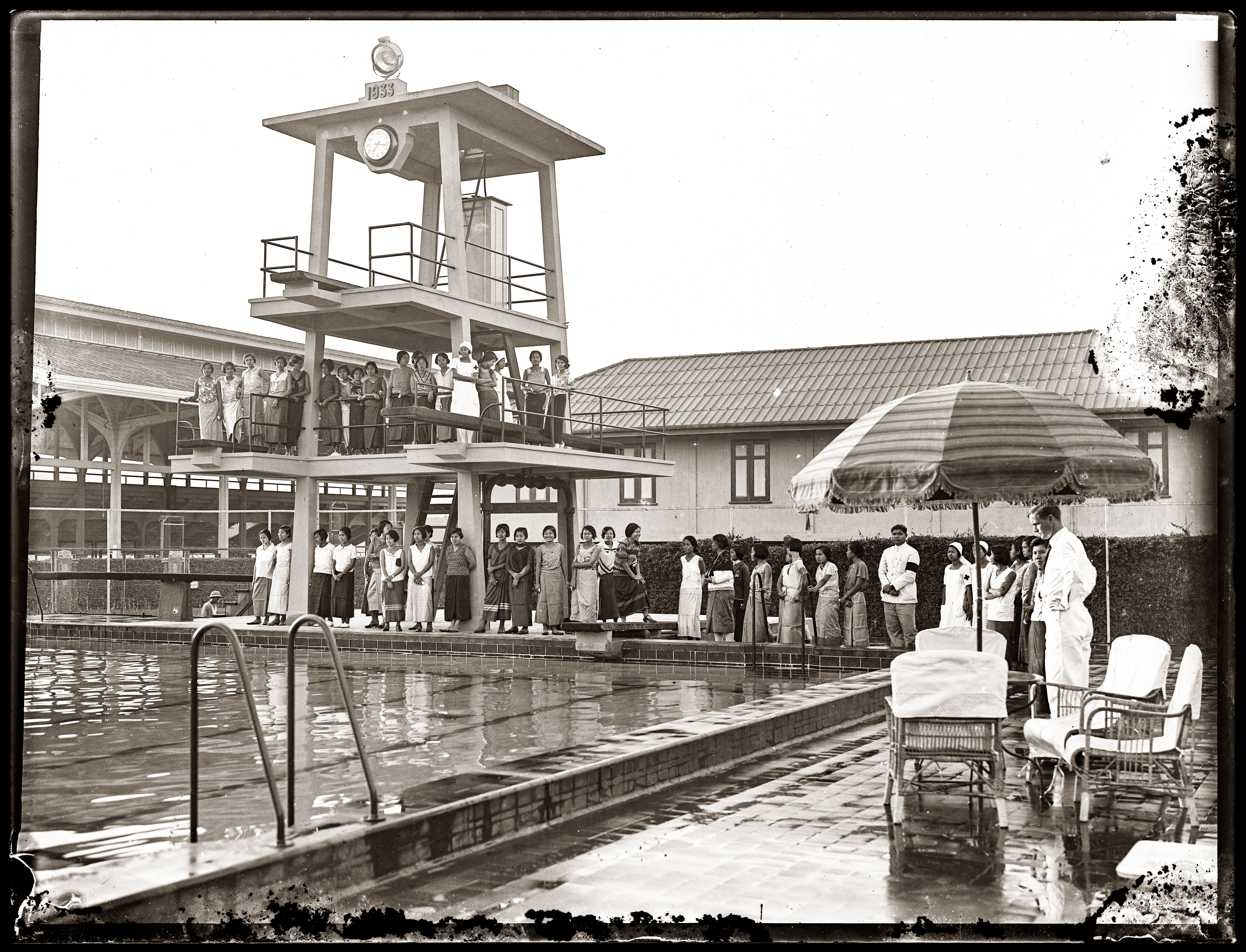
The swimming pool opened in 1933.

The club continued to grow over the years, adding new facilities and introducing new sports. Its clubhouse was first rebuilt in 1912–1915. An Olympic-sized swimming pool, the first in the country, was opened in 1933. A sports pavilion was added in 1977, and a new multi-purpose building, named the Rajkreetha Sports Complex, was opened in 2005.

In 1978, the RBSC took over the Bangkok Riding and Polo Club (situated 1.5 km away on Witthayu Road), which was having financial difficulties. It became the RBSC Polo Club, and operates as a subsidiary of the RBSC, although the memberships are kept separate.

== Location and facilities ==
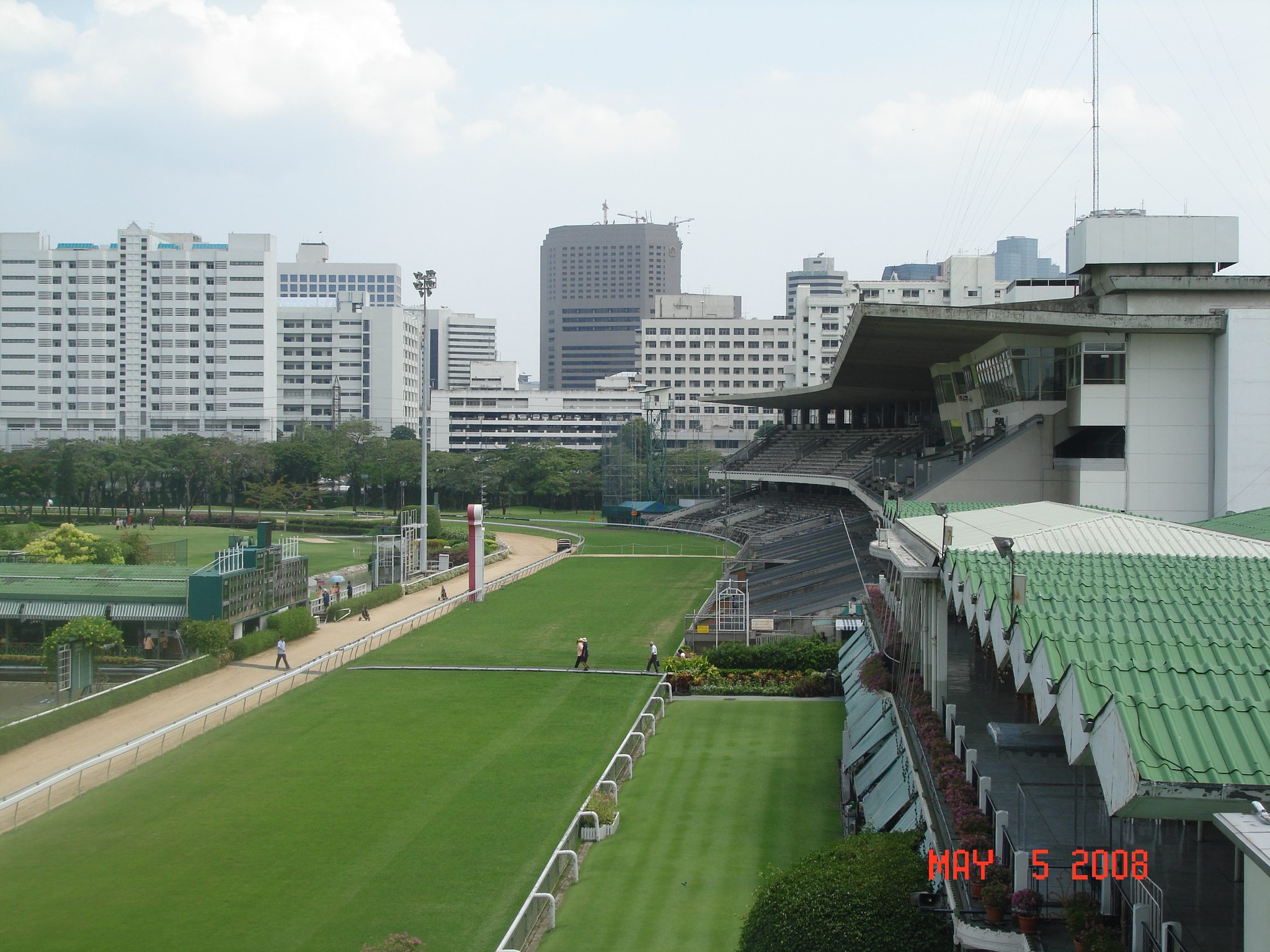
The RBSC's grandstand is the only area open to the public

The RBSC occupies 227 rai (36.3 ha; 90 acres) of land on Henri Dunant Road, opposite Chulalongkorn University. (The road was previously known as Thanon Sanam Ma (ถนนสนามม้า, "Racecourse Road") after the club.) It is surrounded on other sides by the Royal Thai Police Headquarters, Ratchadamri Road and King Chulalongkorn Memorial Hospital/Chulalongkorn University Faculty of Medicine. Its location is among the city centre's prime real estate, and has been estimated to be worth around 100 billion baht (US$3 billion).

RBSC members have access to facilities for badminton, basketball, billiards, bridge, chess, cricket, field hockey, football (soccer), golf (an 18-hole course and a driving range), jogging, lawn bowls, martial arts, physical fitness, qi gong, rugby, squash, swimming, table tennis, tennis and yoga. It also has a dining room, multiple bars, and banquet facilities.

The fortnightly horse races are the only occasion where the RBSC is accessible to the public, and serve as its main source of income. Races are held every other Sunday, from about noon to 18:00. The club holds three major events annually: the King's Cup in February, the Chakri Cup in April, and the Queen's Cup in August.

== Membership ==
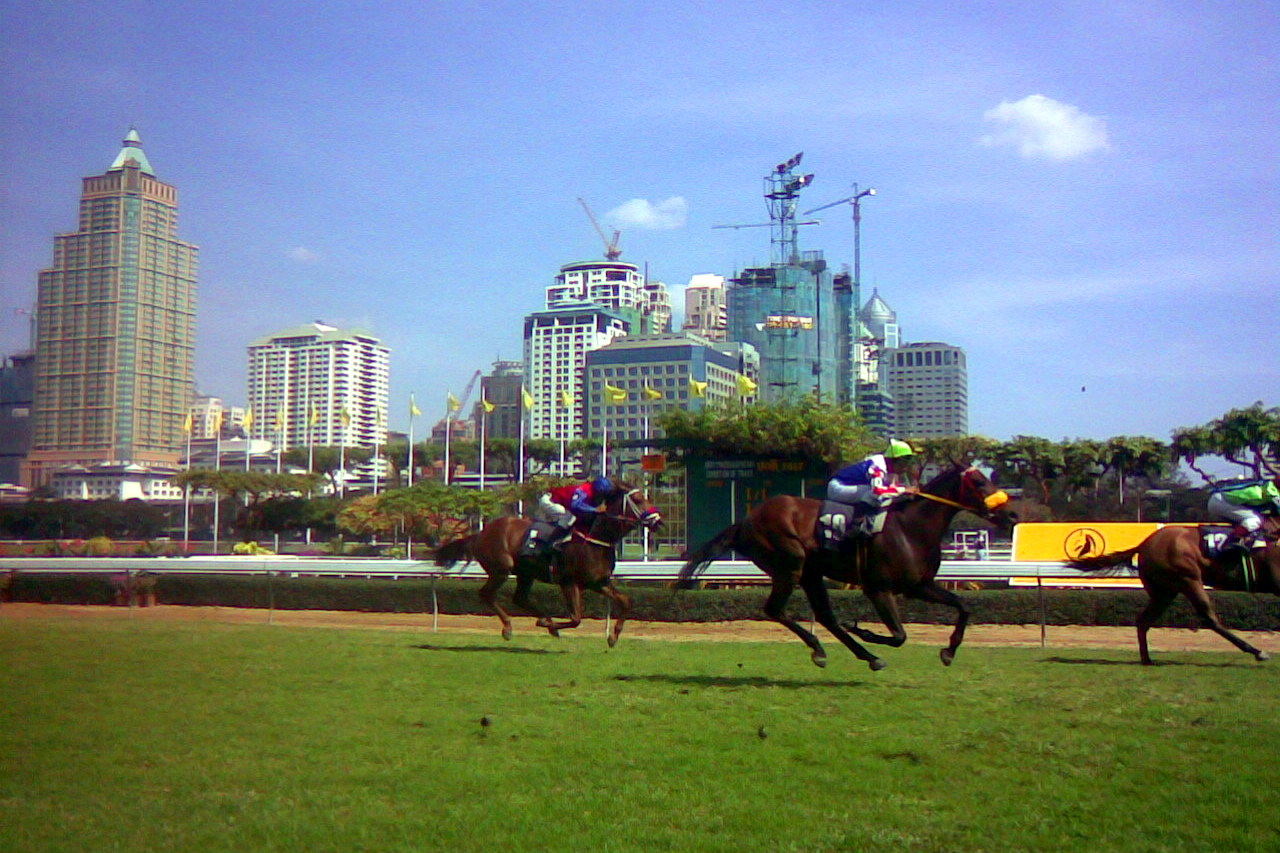
A race at the RBSC

The RBSC is among the most exclusive clubs in Thailand, and is highly selective of its members. Descriptions of the application process in 1990 include being proposed and seconded by existing members, going through a vetting process, and after sitting through a waiting list of up to a decade, being interviewed by the General Committee (the club's executive board), who must give unanimous approval for the application to be successful. New members are also required to pay an entrance fee, reportedly up to 2 million baht ($65,000) in 2011. Children of current members, however, are entitled to membership once they turn 21 years old. The number of members is limited at 12,500 accounts. Polo Club membership has served to help absorb the excess potential members. (RBSC members may use the Polo Club's facilities, while the reverse is not true.)

The club, once described in a golf guidebook as "one of Asia's remnants of the great age of Imperialism", is also very conservative in its values, derived from its gentlemen's club origins. Female members do not have voting rights, and although its membership is now mostly Thai (87% in 1990), proposals to amend the club's articles of association to allow more than half of the General Committee seats to be held by Thais have repeatedly failed, as have suggestions that memberships be made transferable.

== See also ==
- Horse racing in Thailand
- Joseph Caulfield James, an influential chairman of the club during its early days
