= Gambling in Thailand =

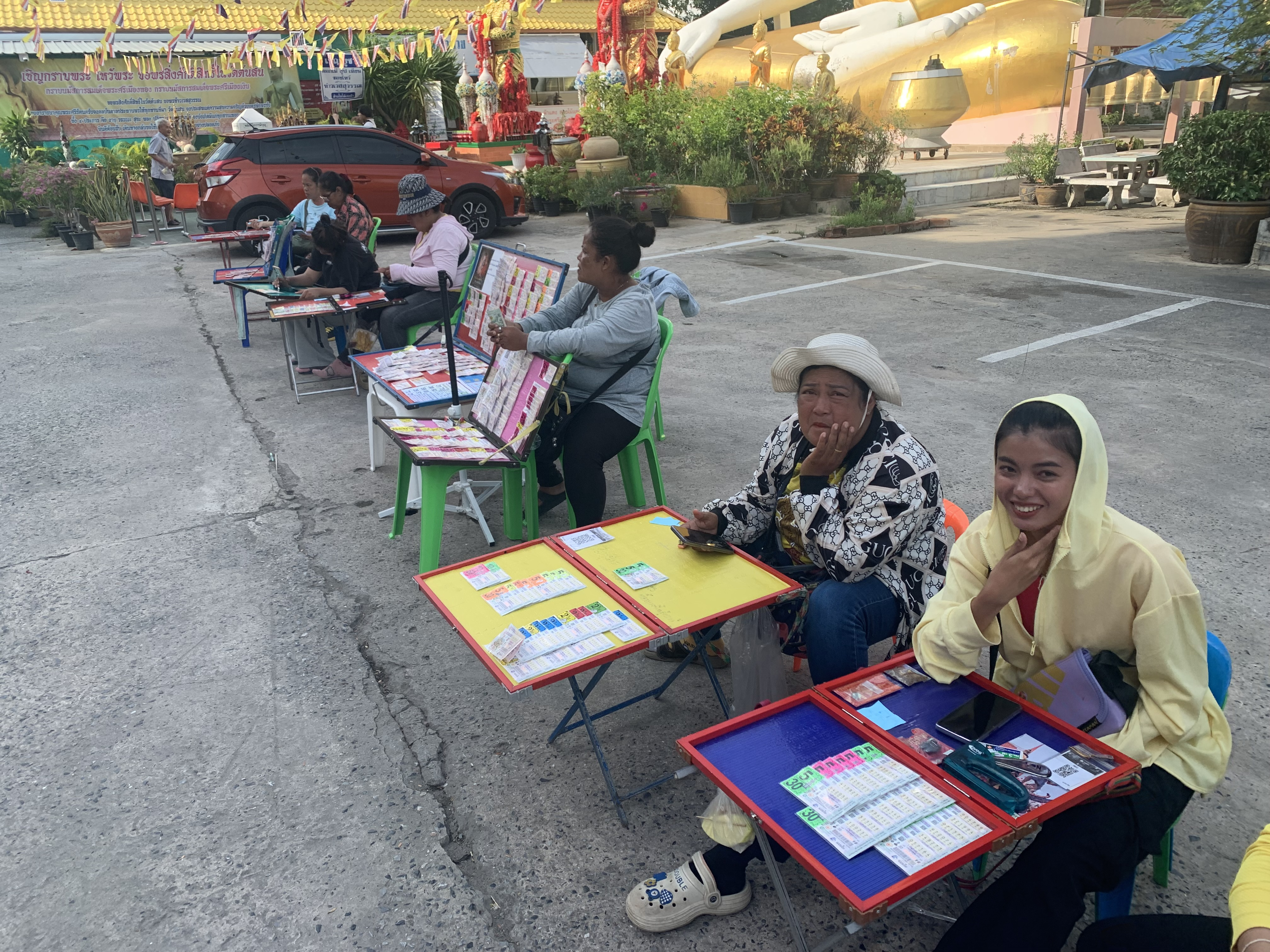
Lottery sellers at Wat Ton Son Temple in Ang Thong

Gambling, other than betting on horse races or the government-sponsored Thai lottery, is prohibited in Thailand. The prohibition dates back to the Gambling Act 1935. The Playing Cards Act prohibits private ownership of more than 120 playing cards without approval of the government. Nevertheless, illegal gambling in casinos (Thai: บ่อนการพนัน) and other forms of gambling still exist in Bangkok and some provincial towns.

== History ==
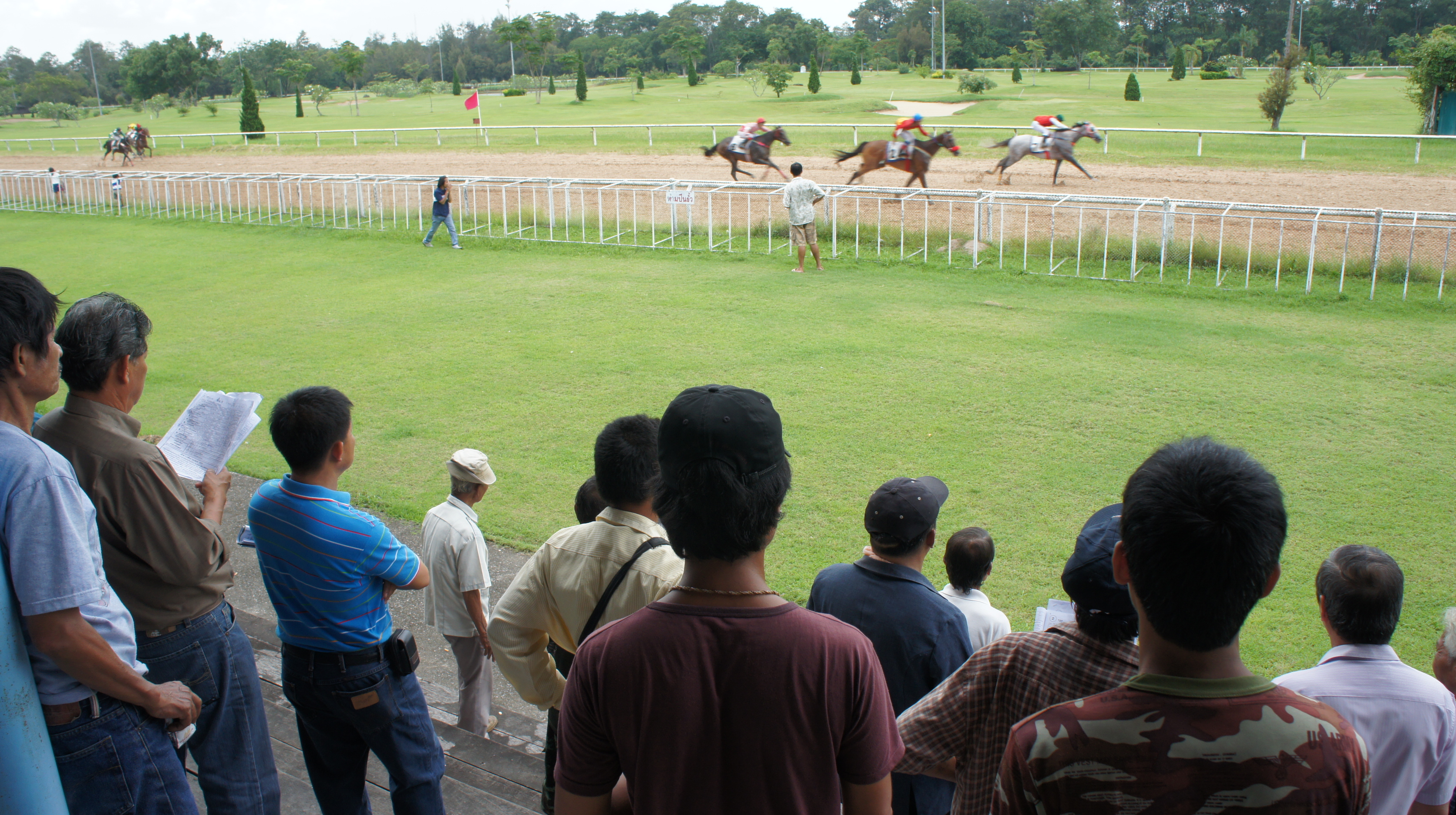
Horse races in Chiang Mai

Gambling has long been a feature of Thai society. Local Siamese partook in more than 100 well known gambling games. Some gambling forms such as betting on cockfights, bullfights and boat races are native to Siamese culture.

The late-19th century marked a significant increase in the level of gambling in Siam. People started to gamble more frequently and a variety of games were introduced from foreign traders and immigrants, and gambling started to hit the mainstream. It was during that period that the Huay lottery was introduced from China and became popular in Siam.

Over the course of decades the Government of Thailand allowed legal gambling dens. During the reign of King Rama III, the Government of Thailand promoted legal gambling dens as a source of revenue. These legal dens were then closed down to dampen criminal activity and bankruptcy related to gambling. During the reign of King Rama V gambling was forbidden in the south and all the remaining gambling venues were closed on 1 April 1917.

=== Gambling Act ===
A gambling act was first passed in 1930 and revised in 1935. During the premiership of Khuang Aphaiwong, the ministry of finance was assigned by the government to legalize gambling in Pran Buri District, Prachuap Khiri Khan Province and became an official promoter of gambling. However, this period of legalization of casinos did not last long. Under attack from the media and public, the government abandoned the attempt to earn additional revenue from casinos and prohibited gambling once again.

=== Failed legalization efforts from 2024 to 2025 ===
In 2024, lawmakers in Thailand started to back efforts to legalize casino gambling in the country, claiming that casino resorts could generate up to $12 billion in tourism revenue. The legalization of casino gambling would expand gambling beyond horse racing. It is hoped that legalization would curtail illicit gambling while increasing revenue for the economy. The Prime Minister of Thailand, Srettha Thavisin also backs the efforts, stating that it would create jobs and help the economy. Las Vegas Sands, MGM Resorts, Wynn Resorts, Genting Group and Galaxy Entertainment Group have all publicly expressed interest in the Thai market. Galaxy Entertainment however is solely focused on getting one of the two available casino licenses for Bangkok.

The Thai government was planning to propose that casino space take up no more than 5% of the space in any integrated resort or complex that is built which includes a casino. Under the proposed legislation, the Thai government would have determined where the integrated resorts would be built.

On 13 January 2025, the Thai government approved a draft law to legalize gambling and casinos in an effort to regulate casino operations, enhance tourism, and increase government revenue while introducing strict licensing and operational requirements. The Integrated Entertainment Business Act, also known as the Entertainment Complex Bill, proposes the legalization of land-based casinos as part of large-scale integrated resorts in Thailand. Initial plans include five licenses, with casinos limited to 5% of resort space. The law proposes a 17% gross gaming revenue tax, rigorous licensing, and operational requirements. In March it was announced that Bangkok, Phuket, Chonburi and Chiang Mai would be the locations where the integrated resorts would be located. It was not confirmed if Bangkok would house two resorts as it was originally proposed.

Opposition from the public to the proposed legislation had grown since the legislation was revealed. Large scale protests had taken place. As a result, parliament had delayed the introduction of the bill until July 2025. Critics alleged that the government had been trying to fast track the bill without considering the effects of commercial casinos. Opposition and delays led to questions over whether the legislation would be passed. 46% of Thai citizens didn’t see the bill passing according to polling. By June 2025, efforts were underway amongst the opposition to hold a referendum on legalization, citing opposition to the proposed casino developments. The Stop Gambling Foundation of Thailand claimed to have gathered enough signatures to hold a referendum. Despite this, any referendum which could have been held would have been non-binding under Thai law.

By late June 2025, the Entertainment Complex Bill was shelved but was still planned to be introduced in Parliament a month later. On July 1, 2025, Prime Minister Paetongtarn Shinawatra was suspended due to a scandal stemming from a leaked phone call, which created further uncertainty about the future of the bill. The opposition was seeking to dismiss her as Prime Minister, and wanted to see the efforts to legalize casinos halted. The Prime Minister was officially removed in August 2025.

On July 7, 2025, the bill was abandoned and will not be introduced. This therefore ended efforts to legalize casinos in Thailand. It is unclear if or when such efforts to legalize casinos may be revisited. Following the withdrawal of the bill, Las Vegas Sands reaffirmed its interest in the Thai market but stated that Thailand needed a clear framework if they were to legalize gambling.

== Forms of gambling ==
=== Casinos ===
Despite laws against gambling, illegal casinos are widespread in Thailand. The first large-scale gambling houses were established in Ayutthaya by the government in the late-17th century or early-18th century as a result of the steady growth of Chinese population. During the 19th century the number of gambling houses grew in tandem with the population of Chinese immigrants. To promote the settlement and taxation of the Chinese population in Thailand, the Thai government turned a blind eye to gambling among Chinese immigrants. As a result of this inadvertent endorsement, local Siamese were encouraged to gamble as well. After the gambling act was first passed in 1930 casinos were banned completely and gambling was prohibited in Thai society.

=== Lottery ===
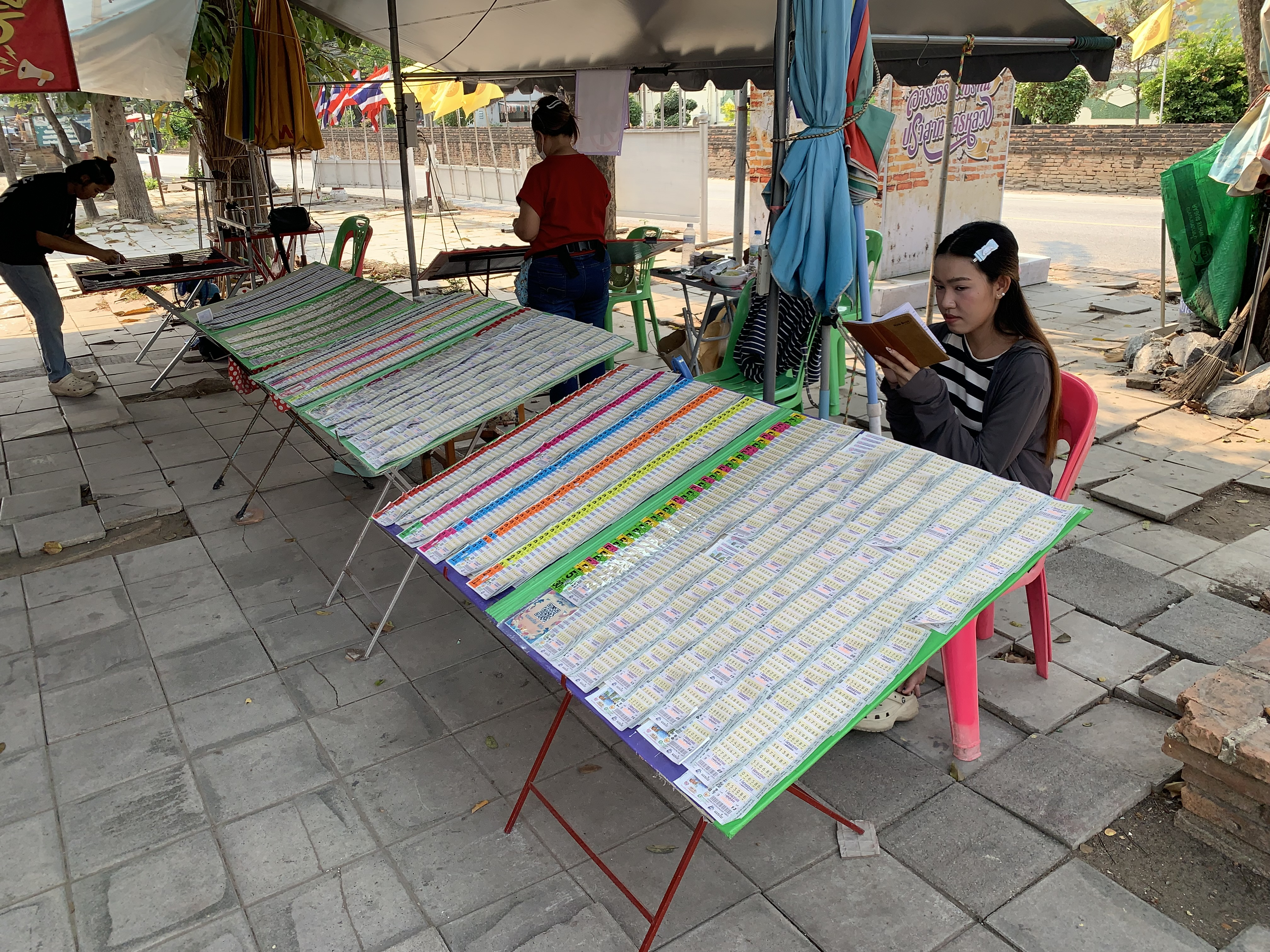
A lottery selling area at Wat Nakhon Luang, Ayutthaya Province

The lottery was introduced to Thailand by Chinese immigrants in 1820. Commonly known to the local as "huai" (Thai: หวย), the term is a direct translation of Chinese word huā (Chinese:花) :flower. In the beginning huay was mainly played among the community of Chinese immigrants in Thailand. It was then officially established during the reign of King Rama III to stimulate the circulation of currency as well as to generate national revenue.

=== Government lottery ===
In the reign of King Rama VI, the government introduced lottery draws as a device for tax collection. In 1939 the government of Field Marshal Plaek Phibunsongkhram set up the Lottery Bureau to organize a regular monthly draw in Thailand. It was then extended to twice a month in 1989. Draws normally happen twice a month on the 1st and 16th. There are a total of 38 million tickets per round. 28 percent of the sales value of the lottery ticket is retained as government revenue, 12 percent in administration and management and 60 percent is returned to players as prizes.

=== Gambling on sport ===
Football betting is the most recent form of illegal gambling in Thailand. As a result of technological advancements such as online transactions, satellite TV, Internet, and mobile phone betting systems, football gambling has become widespread among Thais. During the 2010 FIFA World Cup, over 1,700 people were arrested for gambling offences.

=== Online gambling ===
Online gambling is illegal in Thailand. In 2020, as a part of a campaign against online casinos, the Ministry of Digital Economy and Society began to cooperate with other state agencies to block websites that provide such services. According to the ministry, more than 1 billion baht ($32 million) pass through these sites every year. During a raid in October 2020, the largest group of people in the history of the country, who owned an online casino, was arrested. According to the head of the national police, the group used 38 bank accounts, spending through them at least 15 billion baht ($480m). Later on, 190 websites were blocked, mostly online casinos and porn sites, including Pornhub. This ban sparked a wave of protests and accusations of censorship. In 2025, the Thai government approved a draft plan to legalize both land-based casinos and online gambling in certain zones, aiming to regulate the industry and reduce illegal activity. However, public opinion remains divided, with many citizens expressing concern about the risks of addiction and financial instability.

== Social issues ==
Thai society has long frowned on gambling. In Buddhism, gambling is one of four vices which lead to ruin. In Thai, this concept is known as abaiyamuk (อบายมุข), the "portals of hell". For the layperson, gambling is something to be avoided if one wishes to be free from suffering. Thai people often cite an old proverb: "Ten burglaries leave you with a house, ten fires leave you with a land, but gambling once leave you nothing." (Thai: โจรปล้น 10 ครั้ง ยังเหลือบ้าน ไฟไหม้บ้าน 10 ครั้ง ยังเหลือที่ดิน เล่นการพนันครั้งเดียว ไม่เหลืออะไรสักอย่าง) which reflects the variety of social problems associated with gambling in Thai culture. This may include violent crime, financial problems, and addiction. Despite the prohibition, gambling still remains a major part of Thai life. Thais often gamble in various ceremonies and festivals. According to Alan Klima's study of funeral casinos in present-day Thailand, gambling is used as an attraction for people to keep the deceased spirit company.

There are only a few psychological services available to those addicted, such as the Ministry of Public Health's Center of Gambling Studies. For Thais, gambling—including lotteries, casinos, football betting and other variants—is viewed as entertainment. Very few seek treatment from medical professionals as Thais often view gambling as a social problem rather than a medical issue.
