= Horse racing in Thailand =

Horse racing history in Thailand

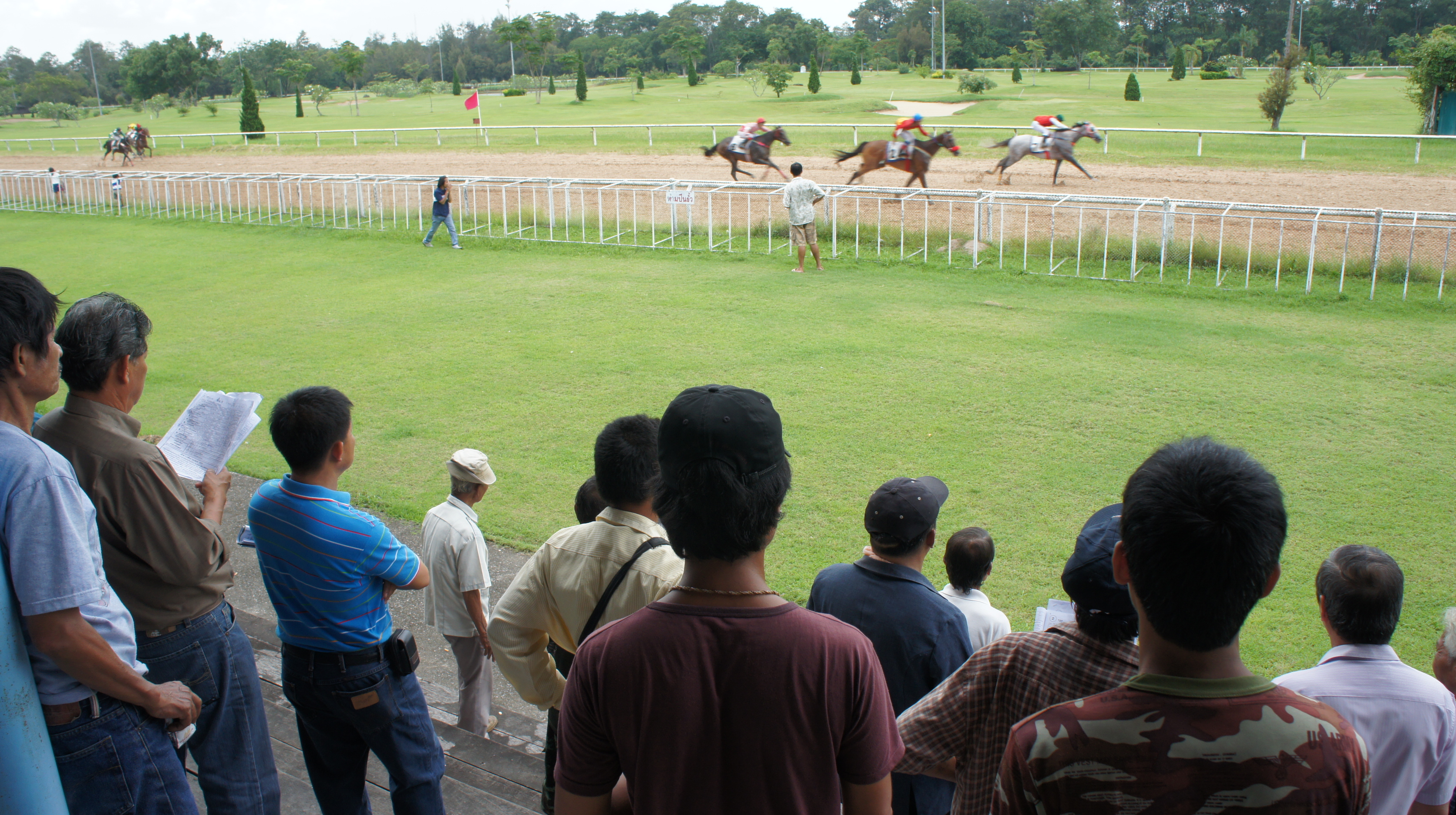
Spectators watching a horse race in Chiang Mai

Horse racing was introduced to Thailand in the late nineteenth century and continues to take place at several locations throughout the country. Betting on horse races is one of the few legal forms of gambling in Thailand, and the sport became highly popular during the mid-twentieth century but has largely declined since. Today, people from lower income groups form the majority of spectators, while the races serve as a networking venue for elite members of society, who own most of the stables.

== History ==
The first horse race took place in Thailand (then known as Siam) in 1897, following King Chulalongkorn's visit to Europe. Racecourses were soon after established in exclusive sports clubs, most notably the Royal Bangkok Sports Club (RBSC), founded in 1901. The Royal Turf Club followed in 1916.

Horse racing originally catered to Western expatriates and Thai aristocrats. It was seen as a civilized activity, and betting was allowed even when other traditional forms of gambling were becoming outlawed. The sport spread to other societal groups in the 1920s, and rapidly gained in popularity. As a result, it began to be viewed as a form of immorality. In 1949, the government ordered that races take place no more than once a week in Bangkok.

Toward the end of the twentieth century, horse racing experienced a gradual decline as races became more restricted and other forms of (illegal) gambling gained popularity. Several racecourses underwent restructuring and/or change of ownership in the 1990s. The Royal Turf Club in Bangkok shut down in 2018. Today, six of eight racecourses throughout the country remain operational. In addition to the one left in Bangkok, there are racecourses in the provinces of Nakhon Ratchasima, Udon Thani, Khon Kaen, and Roi Et, as well as in Chiang Mai. (The one in Maha Sarakham has since closed down.)

Today, horse racing continues to attract regular bettors, although its popularity has declined compared to online alternatives such as football betting and underground lottery games.

== See also ==
- List of Thai flat horse races
