= Presidency of the United Nations Security Council =

Leader of the UN Security Council

Presidency of United Nations Security Council
- رئاسة مجلس الأمن (Arabic)
- 联合国安全理事会主席 (Chinese)
- Présidence du Conseil de sécurité (French)
- Председатель Совета Безопасности (Russian)
- Presidencia del Consejo de Seguridad (Spanish)
- Incumbent; Sanita Pavluta-Deslandes since 1 November 2026
- Member of: United Nations Security Council
- Seat: United Nations Headquarters
- Appointer: United Nations Security Council
- Term length: One month
- Constituting instrument: Charter of the United Nations
- Formation: 17 January 1946
- First holder: Australia
- Website: www.un.org/securitycouncil/content/presidency

The presidency of the United Nations Security Council is responsible for leading the United Nations Security Council. It rotates among the fifteen member-states of the council monthly. The head of the country's delegation is known as the president of the United Nations Security Council. The presidency has rotated every month since its establishment in 1946, and the president serves to coordinate actions of the council, decide policy disputes, and sometimes functions as a diplomat or intermediary between conflicting groups.

== Role ==
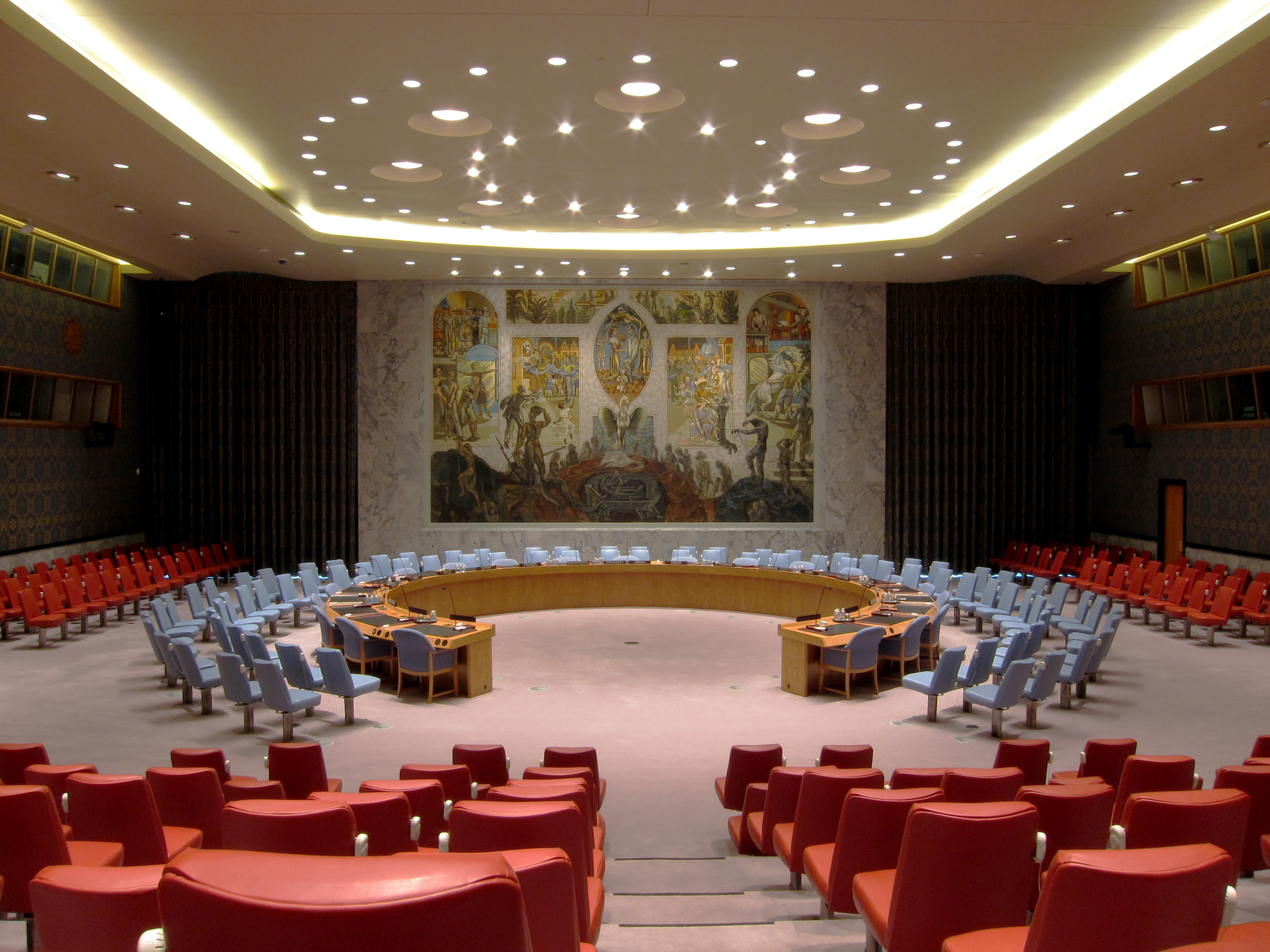
The United Nations Security Council chamber in New York City

The presidency derives responsibility from the Provisional Rules of Procedure of the United Nations Security Council as well as the council's practice. The role of the president involves calling the meetings of the Security Council, approving the provisional agenda (proposed by the secretary-general), presiding at its meetings, deciding questions relating to policy and overseeing any crisis. The president is authorized to issue both Presidential Statements (subject to consensus among Council members) and notes, which are used to make declarations of intent that the full Security Council can then pursue. The president is also responsible for reading statements of the Security Council to the press. The holder of the presidency is considered to be the 'face' and spokesperson of the UNSC. The holder of the presidency may appeal to parties in a conflict to "exercise restraint".

The president represents the Security Council before other United Nations organs and member states. They also call upon members to speak, send applicants for United Nations membership to a committee of the UNSC and decide voting order. Particularly after the end of the Cold War, the president has worked to coordinate the UNSC with other organs. The president has authority to rule upon points of order, which can be put to a vote if a member of the council challenges it. They also name members of various subsidiary organs, and are generally responsible for maintaining order. Since November 2000, the president has generally prepared background papers for the topic being discussed.

The president also continues to represent their state. If their nation is involved in a conflict the UNSC is discussing, they are expected to temporarily step down. Conversely, because the presidency rotates monthly, all nations on the UNSC can evenly emphasize issues important to them. Most non-permanent states hold the presidency once or twice during their two-year terms; Burkina Faso changed its name from Upper Volta in August 1984 during its term, and held it three times. The president often makes a distinction between when they are speaking as the president and as the representative of their state.

Davidson Nicol, an academic, writes that:

Although the role of the President should not be exaggerated, the work of the Council, its reputation and that of the United Nations are very much affected by the calibre and style of the individual who presides over the organ having responsibility for international peace and security. . . The Security Council is the pivot of the United Nations in efforts to maintain and enhance international peace and security. The major function of its President should be to guide it effectively and expeditiously toward this noble goal.

=== Identity ===
The permanent representative (ambassador) of the state to the security council is usually the president of the council, but the presidency is technically given to a state and not a person. For example, in January 2000, a month in which the United States held the presidency of the Security Council, U.S. vice president Al Gore headed the United States delegation to the United Nations for a few days. As a result, Gore was the president of the Security Council during this time. Heads of state have met six times at the UNSC. All members of the council, including the president, must present credentials issued by; the head of state, the head of government, or the minister of foreign affairs of their respective states to the secretary-general, except if the representative is also the head of government or minister of foreign affairs.

== Rotation ==
The United Nations Charter mentions the presidency once, stating that the Security Council is empowered to establish rules of procedure, "including the method of selecting its president" in Article 30. At its first meeting on 17 January 1946, the UNSC adopted provisional rule 18 and established that the presidency would rotate monthly among all the members of the Security Council, with no distinction between permanent and non-permanent members. The rotation takes place in alphabetical order of the member states' official names in English. French was originally proposed as the source of the order, based on its predecessor, the Council of the League of Nations, but English was picked by the executive committee of the UN Preparatory Commission, despite reservations that three permanent members could serve in order (the USSR, United States, and United Kingdom). Australia became the first nation to hold the presidency. Such rotation makes the presidency unique among all United Nations organs. The president of the UNSC is the only non-elected head of a United Nations organ.

The president of the Security Council may optionally recuse themselves when the Security Council debates a question directly connected to the president's nation. For example, Cape Verde served as president in November 1993, but temporarily stepped down for part of the day on 10 November 1993 while the UN General Assembly and Security Council conducted an election to the International Court of Justice where Cape Verde was running for a seat. The Security Council member next in line, China, temporarily served as president during the election.

=== Changes ===
Due to the UNSC's first meeting being on a 17 January, terms initially began on the 17th of every month. Since there were eleven members on the Security Council at the time, the last member in alphabetical order, the United States, was due to end its first term on 16 December 1946. It was suggested by Australia that month to extend the term to 31 December 1946 so that all future rotations of the presidency would occur on the first of every month (United Nations Security Council Resolution 14).

As a result, the first year of operation of the Security Council had all eleven members serve as president exactly once, the United States became the only member to serve a term longer than one month, and all future years that had an eleven-member Security Council would have one member serve twice for the January and December months.

On 1 January 1966, the Security Council was expanded to fifteen members, and no future members would serve as president more than once in a year barring exceptional circumstances.

== Function ==
In 1981, Sydney D. Bailey, an observer of the United Nations, divided the history of the UNSC into three eras; from 1946 to 1955, 1956–1965, and 1966 to 1981. In the first, presidents often acted on their own initiative without consulting the security council. During the second era, the security council was less involved in affairs relating to the Cold War, adopting the slogan "Leave it to Dag [Hammarskjöld]". From 1966 to 1981, the president began informally discussing matters before holding formal sessions and generally becoming more efficient.

=== Early function ===
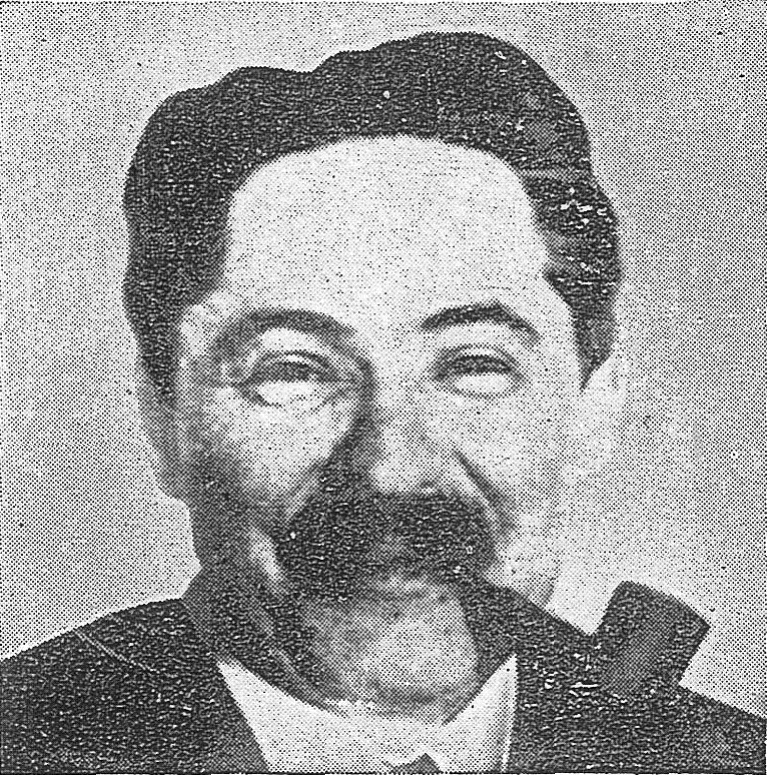
Dmitry Manuilsky

In 1947 and 1948, the UNSC was involved in the independence of Israel and the ensuing 1947–1949 Palestine war. In July 1948, the Ukrainian Soviet Socialist Republic held the presidency. The council met on 7 July upon the request of a United Nations mediator, to consider whether it should promote peace. The UNSC had previously invited representatives of the Arab Higher Committee and the Jewish Agency of Palestine to discuss the issue.

Dmitry Manuilsky, the president in July, addressed the Jewish Agency as 'the representative of the State of Israel'. However, the UNSC had not formally recognized the state. Various member-states criticized his action, and only the United States supported it. In response, the Arab Higher Committee representatives left discussions, and did not return, hindering the UNSC's ability to negotiate the matter. Historian Istvan Pogany considers that "the President deliberately abused his office in order to further the objectives of his government."

In 1948, the president informally engaged in diplomacy several times, the first in January 1948, when the Belgian president requested that India and Pakistan "refrain from any step incompatible with the Charter and liable to result in an aggravation of the situation". In April, the Colombian president met with representatives of the Jewish Agency and Arab Higher Committee to discuss possible terms for peace. Later that year, the Argentinian president established a 'Technical Committee on Berlin Currency and Trade'. In August 1950, Sydney D. Bailey writes that the holder of the presidency, the Soviet Union, manipulated "the procedure of the Council for partisan purposes during debates on Korea".

The president has also formally negotiated on behalf of the UNSC several times. In February 1957, upon the request of the UNSC, then-president Gunnar Jarring of Sweden prepared a report on India–Pakistan relations. He consulted with both nations and discussed many potential solutions to their disagreements, none of which were agreed upon. Such actions have generally not been requested since the 1970s. The president will also manage less formal negotiations upon request of the council.

=== Later function ===
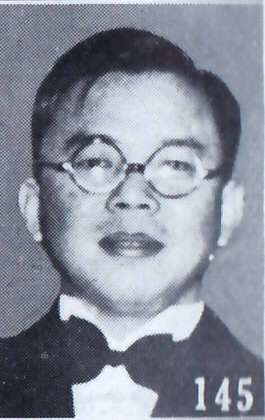
Tsiang held the presidency 16 times, starting in 1948 and ending in 1962.

In a 31 March 1976 meeting discussing South African aggression against Angola, the meeting continued past midnight and it was technically 1 April. Thomas S. Boya, the representative of Benin and president for March, offered to pass the presidency on to China. Though the meeting was adjourned before a decision was reached, it became established procedure for the president to step down exactly when the month elapsed. A similar case on 31 May 2010 resulted in Nawaf Salam of Lebanon giving the presidency to Claude Heller of Mexico.

In September 1994, during the Rwandan genocide, Rwanda was supposed to hold the presidency, but had not been present at Security Council meetings from 14 July. On 25 August, the Council decided to allow Spain to hold the position for September. A Rwandan delegation was again present on 16 September, and it was decided that the nation would hold the presidency in December. The presidency has been ceded several times: the United States ceded in 1948, China in 1950, India in 1951, Lebanon in 1956, and the United Kingdom in 1968. On 10 November 1993 the representative of Cape Verde, José Luís Jesus, ceded to China as he was a candidate for election to the International Court of Justice; and on 15 December 1994 the Rwandan representative ceded to Argentina. Both the United States and Soviet Union refused requests to cede the presidency, the US during the Cold War and USSR during the Congo Crisis.

Taieb Slim, the Tunisian holder of the presidency in September 1980, asked Iran and Iraq to "desist from all armed activity and all acts that might worsen the dangerous situation and to settle their dispute by peaceful means." The presidency was reformed in a 2010 note revised its function, largely focusing on increasing transparency. Efforts at such reform had begun in the 1990s. There have been various other efforts to reform the position, such as allowing terms to be extended during times of war.

Numerous people have served multiple times as president. The most times anyone has held the position is sixteen, by T.F. Tsiang, a representative of the Republic of China; the second-most was held by Yakov Malik, a representative of the USSR, ten.

== List of presidents ==
=== 1946–1949 ===
Presidents from 1946 to 1949:

Dates	State	Name
17 January – 16 February 1946	Australia	Norman Makin
17 February – 16 March 1946	Brazil	Cyro de Freitas Valle
17 March – 16 April 1946	China	Guo Taiqi
17 April – 16 May 1946	Egypt	Hafez Afifi Pasha
17 May – 16 June 1946	France	Alexandre Parodi
17 June – 16 July 1946	Mexico	Francisco Castillo Nájera
17 July – 16 August 1946	Netherlands	Eelco van Kleffens
17 August – 16 September 1946	Poland	Oskar R. Lange
17 September – 16 October 1946	Soviet Union	Andrei Gromyko
17 October – 16 November 1946	United Kingdom	Alexander Cadogan
17 November – 31 December 1946	United States	Herschel V. Johnson II
January 1947	Australia	Norman Makin
February 1947	Belgium	Fernand van Langenhove
March 1947	Brazil	Oswaldo Aranha
April 1947	China	Quo Tai-chi
May 1947	Colombia	Alfonso López Pumarejo
June 1947	France	Alexandre Parodi
July 1947	Poland	Oskar R. Lange
August 1947	Syria	Faris al-Khoury
September 1947	Soviet Union	Andrei Gromyko
October 1947	United Kingdom	Alexander Cadogan
November 1947	United States	Warren Austin
December 1947	Australia	John Hood
January 1948	Belgium	Fernand van Langenhove
February 1948	Canada	A. G. L. McNaughton
March 1948	China	Tsiang Tingfu
April 1948	Colombia	Alfonso López Pumarejo
May 1948	France	Alexandre Parodi
June 1948	Syria	Faris al-Khoury
July 1948	Ukrainian SSR	Dmitry Manuilsky
August 1948	Soviet Union	Yakov Malik
September 1948	United Kingdom	Alexander Cadogan
October 1948	United States; Argentina	Warren Austin; Juan Atilio Bramuglia
November 1948	Argentina	José Arce
December 1948	Belgium	Fernand van Langenhove
January 1949	Canada	A. G. L. McNaughton
February 1949	China	Tsiang Tingfu
March 1949	Cuba	Alberto Inocente Álvarez
April 1949	Egypt	Mahmoud Fawzi Bey
May 1949	France	Jean Chauvel
June 1949	Norway	Arne Sunde
July 1949	Ukrainian SSR	Dmitry Manuilsky
August 1949	Soviet Union	Semyon K. Tsarapkin
September 1949	United Kingdom	Alexander Cadogan
October 1949	United States	Warren Austin
November 1949	Argentina	José Arce
December 1949	Canada	A. G. L. McNaughton

=== 1950–1954 ===
Presidents from 1950 to 1954:

Dates	State	Name
January 1950	China	Tsiang Tingfu
February 1950	Cuba	Carlos Blanco Sanchez
March 1950	Ecuador	Homero Viteri Lafronte
April 1950	Egypt	Mahmoud Fawzi Bey
May 1950	France	Jean Chauvel
June 1950	India	Benegal Narsing Rau
July 1950	Norway	Arne Sunde
August 1950	Soviet Union	Yakov Malik
September 1950	United Kingdom	Gladwyn Jebb
October 1950	United States	Warren Austin
November 1950	Yugoslavia	Aleš Bebler
December 1950	China	Tsiang Tingfu
January 1951	Ecuador	Antonio Quevedo
February 1951	France	François Lacoste
March 1951	India; Netherlands	Benegal Narsing Rau; D. J. von Balluseck
April 1951	Netherlands	D. J. von Balluseck
May 1951	Turkey	Selim Sarper and Ilhan Savut
June 1951	Soviet Union	Yakov Malik
July 1951	United Kingdom	Gladwyn Jebb
August 1951	United States	Warren Austin
September 1951	Yugoslavia	Aleš Bebler
October 1951	Brazil	João Carlos Muniz
November 1951	China	Tsiang Tingfu
December 1951	Ecuador	Antonio Quevedo
January 1952	France	Jean Chauvel
February 1952	Greece	Alexis Kyrou
March 1952	Netherlands	D. J. von Balluseck
April 1952	Pakistan	Patras Bokhari
May 1952	Turkey	Selim Sarper
June 1952	Soviet Union	Yakov Malik
July 1952	United Kingdom	Gladwyn Jebb
August 1952	United States	Warren Austin
September 1952	Brazil	João Carlos Muniz
October 1952	Chile	Hernán Santa Cruz
November 1952	China	Tsiang Tingfu
December 1952	France	Henri Hoppenot
January 1953	Greece	Alexis Kyrou
February 1953	Lebanon	Charles Malik
March 1953	Pakistan	Ahmed S. Bokhari
April 1953	Soviet Union	Andrey Vyshinsky
May 1953	United Kingdom	Gladwyn Jebb
June 1953	United States	Henry Cabot Lodge Jr.
July 1953	Chile	Rudecindo Ortega Masson
August 1953	China	Tsiang Tingfu
September 1953	Colombia	Francisco José Urrutia Holguín
October 1953	Denmark	William Borberg
November 1953	France	Henri Hoppenot
December 1953	Greece	Alexis Kyrou
January 1954	Lebanon	Charles Malik
February 1954	New Zealand	Leslie Munro
March 1954	Turkey	Selim Sarper
April 1954	Soviet Union	Andrey Vyshinsky
May 1954	United Kingdom	Pierson Dixon
June 1954	United States	Henry Cabot Lodge Jr.
July 1954	Brazil	Ernesto Leme
August 1954	China	Tsiang Tingfu
September 1954	Colombia	Francisco José Urrutia Holguín
October 1954	Denmark	William Borberg
November 1954	France	Henri Hoppenot
December 1954	Lebanon	Charles Malik

=== 1955–1959 ===
Presidents from 1955 to 1959:

Dates	State	Name
January 1955	New Zealand	Leslie Munro
February 1955	Peru	Victor Belaunde
March 1955	Turkey	Selim Sarper
April 1955	Soviet Union	Arkady Sobolev
May 1955	United Kingdom	Pierson Dixon
June 1955	United States	Henry Cabot Lodge Jr.
July 1955	Belgium	Fernand van Langenhove
August 1955	Brazil	Cyro de Freitas Valle
September 1955	Republic of China	Tsiang Tingfu
October 1955	France	Henri Hoppenot
November 1955	Iran	Nasrollah Entezam
December 1955	New Zealand	Leslie Munro
January 1956	Peru	Victor Belaunde
February 1956	Soviet Union	Arkady Sobolev
March 1956	United Kingdom	Pierson Dixon
April 1956	United States	Henry Cabot Lodge Jr.
May 1956	Yugoslavia	Jože Brilej
June 1956	Australia	Edward Ronald Walker
July 1956	Belgium	Josef Nisot
August 1956	Republic of China	Tsiang Tingfu
September 1956	Cuba	Emilio Núñez Portuondo
October 1956	France	Christian Pineau, Bernard Cornut-Gentille, and Louis de Guiringaud
November 1956	Iran	Nasrollah Entezam
December 1956	Peru	Victor Belaunde
January 1957	Philippines	Carlos P. Romulo
February 1957	Sweden	Gunnar Jarring
March 1957	Soviet Union	Arkady Sobolev
April 1957	United Kingdom	Pierson Dixon
May 1957	United States	Henry Cabot Lodge Jr.
June 1957	Australia	Edward Ronald Walker
July 1957	Republic of China	Tsiang Tingfu
August and September 1957	Colombia; Cuba	Francisco José Urrutia Holguín; Emilio Núñez Portuondo
October 1957	France	Guillaume Georges-Picot
November 1957	Iraq	Hashim Jawad
December 1957	Philippines	Carlos P. Romulo
January 1958	Sweden	Gunnar Jarring
February 1958	Soviet Union	Arkady Sobolev
March 1958	United Kingdom	Pierson Dixon
April 1958	United States	Henry Cabot Lodge Jr.
May 1958	Canada	Charles Ritchie
June 1958	Republic of China	Tsiang Tingfu
July 1958	Colombia	Alfonso Araújo Gaviria
August 1958	France	Guillaume Georges-Picot
September 1958	Iraq	Hashim Jawad
October 1958	Japan	Koto Matsudaira
November 1958	Panama	Jorge Illueca
December 1958	Sweden	Gunnar Jarring
January 1959	Tunisia	Mongi Slim
February 1959	Soviet Union	Arkady Sobolev
March 1959	United Kingdom	Pierson Dixon
April 1959	United States	Henry Cabot Lodge Jr.
May 1959	Argentina	Mario Amadeo
June 1959	Canada	Charles Ritchie
July 1959	Republic of China	Tsiang Tingfu
August 1959	France	Armand Bérard
September 1959	Italy	Egidio Ortona
October 1959	Japan	Koto Matsudaira
November 1959	Panama	Jorge Illueca
December 1959	Tunisia	Mongi Slim

=== 1960–1964 ===
Presidents from 1960 to 1964:

Dates	State	Name
January 1960	Soviet Union	Arkady Sobolev
February 1960	United Kingdom	Pierson Dixon
March 1960	United States	Henry Cabot Lodge Jr.
April 1960	Argentina	Mario Amadeo
May 1960	Ceylon	Claude Corea
June 1960	Republic of China	Tsiang Tingfu
July 1960	Ecuador	José A. Correa
August 1960	France	Armand Bérard
September 1960	Italy	Egidio Ortona
October 1960	Poland	Bohdan Lewandowski
November 1960	Tunisia	Mongi Slim
December 1960	Soviet Union	Valerian Zorin
January 1961	United Arab Republic	Omar Loutfi
February 1961	United Kingdom	Patrick Dean
March 1961	United States	Adlai E. Stevenson
April 1961	Ceylon	T. B. Subasinghe
May 1961	Chile	Daniel Schweitzer
June 1961	Republic of China	Tsiang Tingfu and Y. C. Hsueh
July 1961	Ecuador	Leopoldo Benites
August 1961	France	Armand Bérard
September 1961	Liberia	Nathan Barnes
October 1961	Turkey	Turgut Menemencioglu
November 1961	Soviet Union	Valerian Zorin
December 1961	United Arab Republic	Omar Loutfi
January 1962	United Kingdom	Patrick Dean
February 1962	United States	Adlai E. Stevenson and Francis T. P. Plimpton
March 1962	Venezuela	Carlos Sosa Rodríguez
April 1962	Chile	Daniel Schweitzer
May 1962	Republic of China	Tsiang Tingfu
June 1962	France	Armand Bérard
July 1962	Ghana	Alex Quaison-Sackey
August 1962	Ireland	Frederick Boland
September 1962	Romania	Mihai Haseganu
October 1962	Soviet Union	Platon Morozov and Valerian Zorin
November 1962	United Arab Republic	Mahmoud Riad
December 1962	United Kingdom	Patrick Dean
January 1963	United States	Adlai E. Stevenson
February 1963	Venezuela	Carlos Sosa-Rodriguez
March 1963	Brazil	Geraldo de Carvalho Silos
April 1963	Republic of China	Liu Chieh
May 1963	France	Roger Seydoux
June 1963	Ghana	Alex Quaison-Sackey
July 1963	Morocco	Ahmed Taibi Benhima
August 1963	Norway	Sievert A. Nielsen
September 1963	Philippines	Jacinto Castel Borja
October 1963	Soviet Union	Nikolai Fedorenko
November 1963	United Kingdom	Patrick Dean
December 1963	United States	Adlai E. Stevenson, Charles Yost, and Francis T. P. Plimpton
January 1964	Bolivia	Renan Castrillo Justiniano
February 1964	Brazil	Carlos A. Bernardes
March 1964	Republic of China	Liu Chieh
April 1964	Czechoslovakia	Jiří Hájek
May 1964	France	Roger Seydoux
June 1964	Ivory Coast	Arsene A. Usher
July 1964	Morocco	Ahmed Taibi Benhima
August 1964	Norway	Sievert A. Nielsen
September 1964	Soviet Union	Platon D. Morozov
October 1964	United Kingdom	Patrick Dean
November 1964	United States	Adlai E. Stevenson
December 1964	Bolivia	Fernando Ortiz Sanz

=== 1965–1969 ===
Presidents from 1965 to 1969:

Dates	State	Name
January 1965	Republic of China	Liu Chieh
February 1965	France	Roger Seydoux
March 1965	Ivory Coast	Arsene Usher
April 1965	Jordan	Abdul Monem Rifa'i
May 1965	Malaysia	Radhakrishna Ramani
June 1965	Netherlands	J. G. de Beus
July 1965	Soviet Union	Platon Morozov
August 1965	United Kingdom	Roger Jackling
September 1965	United States	Arthur Goldberg
October 1965	Uruguay	Hector Payssé Reyes
November 1965	Bolivia	Fernando Ortiz Sanz
December 1965	Republic of China	Liu Chieh
January 1966	France	Roger Seydoux
February 1966	Japan	Akira Matsui
March 1966	Jordan	Muhammed El-Farra
April 1966	Mali	Moussa Leo Keita
May 1966	Netherlands	J. G. de Beus
June 1966	New Zealand	Frank Corner
July 1966	Nigeria	Simeon Adebo
August 1966	Uganda	Apollo Kironde
September 1966	Soviet Union	Nikolai Fedorenko
October 1966	United Kingdom	Hugh Foot, Baron Caradon and Roger Jackling
November 1966	United States	Arthur Goldberg
December 1966	Uruguay	Pedro P. Berro
January 1967	Argentina	Raúl Alberto Quijano
February 1967	Brazil	José Sette Câmara
March 1967	Bulgaria	Milko Tarabanov
April 1967	Canada	George Ignatieff
May 1967	Republic of China	Liu Chieh
June 1967	Denmark	Hans Tabor
July 1967	Ethiopia	Endelkachew Makonnen
August 1967	France	Roger Seydoux
September 1967	India	Gopalaswami Parthasarathi
October 1967	Japan	Senjin Tsuruoka
November 1967	Mali	Mamadou Boubacar Kante
December 1967	Nigeria	Simeon Adebo
January 1968	Pakistan	Agha Shahi
February 1968	Paraguay	Miguel Solano Lopez
March 1968	Senegal	Ousmane Socé
April 1968	Soviet Union	Yakov Malik
May 1968	United Kingdom	Hugh Foot, Baron Caradon
June 1968	United States	Arthur Goldberg
July 1968	Algeria	Tewfik Bouattoura
August 1968	Brazil	João Augusto de Araújo Castro
September 1968	Canada	George Ignatieff
October 1968	Republic of China	Liu Chieh
November 1968	Denmark	Otto L. Borch
December 1968	Ethiopia	Endelkachew Makonnen
January 1969	Finland	Max Jakobson
February 1969	France	Armand Bérard
March 1969	Hungary	Károly Csatorday
April 1969	Nepal	Padma Bahadur Khatri
May 1969	Pakistan	Agha Shahi
June 1969	Paraguay	Miguel Solano Lopez
July 1969	Senegal	Ibrahima Boye
August 1969	Spain	Jaime de Piniés
September 1969	Soviet Union	Yakov Malik
October 1969	United Kingdom	Hugh Foot, Baron Caradon
November 1969	United States	Charles Yost
December 1969	Zambia	Vernon Mwaanga

=== 1970–1974 ===
Presidents from 1970 to 1974:

Dates	State	Name
January 1970	Burundi	Terence Nsanze
February 1970	Republic of China	Liu Chieh
March 1970	Colombia	Joaquín Vallejo Arbeláez
April 1970	Finland	Max Jakobson
May 1970	France	Jacques Kosciusco-Morizet
June 1970	Nepal	Padma Bahadur Khatri
July 1970	Nicaragua	Guillermo Sevilla Sacasa
August 1970	Poland	Eugeniusz Kułaga
September 1970	Sierra Leone	Davidson Nicol
October 1970	Spain	Jaime de Piniés
November 1970	Syria	George Tomeh
December 1970	Soviet Union	Yakov Malik
January 1971	United Kingdom	Colin Crowe
February 1971	United States	Charles Woodruff Yost
March 1971	Argentina	Carlos Ortiz de Rozas
April 1971	Belgium	Edouard Longerstaey
May 1971	Burundi	Terence Nsanze
June 1971	Republic of China	Liu Chieh
July 1971	France	Jacques Kosciusco-Morizet
August 1971	Italy	Piero Vinci
September 1971	Japan	Toru Nakagawa
October 1971	Nicaragua	Guillermo Sevilla Sacasa
November 1971	Poland	Eugeniusz Kułaga
December 1971	Sierra Leone	Ismail Byne Taylor-Kamara
January 1972	Somalia	Abdulrahim Abby Farah and Umar Arteh Ghalib
February 1972	Sudan	Mansour Khalid, Rahmatalla Abdalla, and Mohammed Fakhreddine
March 1972	Soviet Union	Yakov Malik
April 1972	United Kingdom	Colin Crowe
May 1972	United States	George H. W. Bush
June 1972	Yugoslavia	Lazar Mojsov
July 1972	Argentina	Carlos Ortiz de Rozas
August 1972	Belgium	Edouard Longerstaey
September 1972	China	Huang Hua
October 1972	France	Louis de Guiringaud
November 1972	Guinea	Jeanne-Martin Cissé
December 1972	India	Samar Sen
January 1973	Indonesia	Chaidir Anwar Sani
February 1973	Kenya	Joseph Odero-Jowi
March 1973	Panama	Aquilino Boyd, Omar Torrijos, and Juan Antonio Tack
April 1973	Peru	Javier Pérez de Cuéllar
May 1973	Sudan	Ramatalla Abdulla
June 1973	Soviet Union	Yakov Malik
July 1973	United Kingdom	Kenneth Jamieson and Colin Crowe
August 1973	United States	John A. Scali
September 1973	Yugoslavia	Lazar Mojsov
October 1973	Australia	Laurence McIntyre
November 1973	Austria	Peter Jankowitsch
December 1973	China	Huang Hua
January 1974	Costa Rica	Gonzalo Facio Segreda
February 1974	France	Louis de Guiringaud
March 1974	Indonesia	Chaidir Anwar Sani
April 1974	Iraq	Talib Shabib
May 1974	Kenya	Charles Gatere Maina
June 1974	Mauritania	Moulaye El Hassen
July 1974	Peru	Javier Pérez de Cuéllar
August 1974	Soviet Union	Yakov Malik
September 1974	United Kingdom	Ivor Richard
October 1974	Cameroon	Michel Njine
November 1974	United States	John A. Scali
December 1974	Australia	Laurence McIntyre

=== 1975–1979 ===
Presidents from 1975 to 1979:

Dates	State	Name
January 1975	(Byelorussian Soviet Socialist Republic) Byelorussian SSR	Guerodot G. Tchernouchtchenko
February 1975	China	Huang Hua
March 1975	Costa Rica	Gonzalo J. Facio and Fernando Salazar
April 1975	France	Louis de Guiringaud
May 1975	Guyana	Shridath Ramphal
June 1975	Iraq	Abdul Karim Al-Shaikhly
July 1975	Italy	Eugenio Plaja
August 1975	Japan	Shizuo Saito
September 1975	Mauritania	Moulaye El Hassen
October 1975	Sweden	Olof Rydbeck
November 1975	Soviet Union	Yakov Malik
1–15, 17–31 December 1975	United Kingdom	Ivor Richard
16 December 1975	Cameroon	Ferdinand Oyono
January 1976	United Republic of Tanzania	Salim Ahmed Salim
February 1976	United States	Daniel Patrick Moynihan
March 1976	Benin	Thomas S. Boya
April 1976	China	Huang Hua
May 1976	France	Louis de Guiringaud
June 1976	Guyana	Rashleigh E. Jackson and Frederick R. Wills
July 1976	Italy	Piero Vinci
August 1976	Japan	Isao Abe
September 1976	Libya	Mansour Rashid El-Kikhia
October 1976	Pakistan	Iqbal A. Akhund
November 1976	Panama	Jorge Illueca
December 1976	Romania	Ion Datcu
January 1977	Soviet Union	Oleg Troyanovsky
February 1977	United Kingdom	James Murray
March 1977	United States	Andrew Young
April 1977	Venezuela	Simón Alberto Consalvi
May 1977	Benin	Thomas S. Boya
June 1977	Canada	William Hickson Barton
July 1977	China	Chen Chu
August 1977	France	Jacques Leprette
September 1977	Federal Republic of Germany	Rüdiger von Wechmar
October 1977	India	Rikhi Jaipal
November 1977	Libya	Mansour Rashid El-Kikhia
December 1977	Mauritius	Radha Krishna Ramphul and Harold E. Walter
January 1978	Nigeria	Joseph Nanven Garba and Leslie O. Harriman
February 1978	Soviet Union	Oleg Troyanovsky
March 1978	United Kingdom	Ivor Richard
April 1978	United States	Andrew Young
May 1978	Venezuela	Ruben Carpio Castillo
June 1978	Bolivia	Mario Rolon Anaya
July 1978	Canada	William Hickson Barton
August 1978	China	Chen Chu
September 1978	Czechoslovakia	Ilja Hulínský
October 1978	France	Jacques Leprette
November 1978	Gabon	Léon N'Dong
December 1978	Federal Republic of Germany	Rüdiger von Wechmar
January 1979	Jamaica	Donald O. Mills
February 1979	Kuwait	Abdalla Y. Bishara
March 1979	Nigeria	Leslie O. Harriman
April 1979	Norway	Ole Ålgård
May 1979	Portugal	Vasco Futscher Pereira
June 1979	Soviet Union	Oleg Troyanovsky
July 1979	United Kingdom	Ivor Richard
August 1979	United States	Andrew Young
September 1979	Zambia	Paul J. F. Lusaka
October 1979	Bangladesh	Khwaja Mohammed Kaiser
November 1979	Bolivia	Sergio Palacios de Vizzio
December 1979	China	Chen Chu

=== 1980–1984 ===
Presidents from 1980 to 1984:

Dates	State	Name
January 1980	France	Jacques Leprette
February 1980	German Democratic Republic	Peter Florin
March 1980	Jamaica	Donald O. Mills
April 1980	Mexico	Porfirio Muñoz Ledo
May 1980	Niger	Ide Oumarou
June 1980	Norway	Ole Ålgård
July 1980	Philippines	Carlos P. Romulo
August 1980	Portugal	Vasco Futscher Pereira
September 1980	Tunisia	Taieb Slim
October 1980	Soviet Union	Oleg Troyanovsky
November 1980	United Kingdom	Anthony Parsons
December 1980	United States	Donald McHenry
January 1981	China	Ling Qing
February 1981	France	Jacques Leprette
March 1981	German Democratic Republic	Peter Florin
April 1981	Ireland	Noel Dorr
May 1981	Japan	Masahiro Nisibori
June 1981	Mexico	Porfirio Muñoz Ledo
July 1981	Niger	Ide Oumarou
August 1981	Panama	Jorge Illueca
September 1981	Philippines	Carlos P. Romulo
October 1981	Spain	Jaime de Piniés
November 1981	Tunisia	Taieb Slim
December 1981	Uganda	Olara Otunnu
January 1982	Soviet Union	Oleg Troyanovsky
February 1982	United Kingdom	Anthony Parsons
March 1982	United States	Jeane Kirkpatrick
April 1982	Zaire	Gérard Kamanda wa Kamanda
May 1982	China	Ling Qing
June 1982	France	Luc de la Barre de Nanteuil
July 1982	Guyana	Noel G. Sinclair
August 1982	Ireland	Noel Dorr
September 1982	Japan	Masahiro Nisibori
October 1982	Jordan	Hazem Nuseibeh
November 1982	Panama	Carlos Ozores Typaldos
December 1982	Poland	Włodzimierz Natorf
January 1983	Togo	Atsu-Koffi Amega
February 1983	Soviet Union	Oleg Troyanovsky
March 1983	United Kingdom	John Thomson
April 1983	United States	Jeane Kirkpatrick
May 1983	Zaire	Umba di Lutete and Gérard Kamanda wa Kamanda
June 1983	Zimbabwe	Elleck Mashingaidze
July 1983	China	Ling Qing
August 1983	France	Luc de la Barre de Nanteuil
September 1983	Guyana	Noel G. Sinclair
October 1983	Jordan	Abdullah Salah
November 1983	Malta	Victor J. Gauci
December 1983	Netherlands	Max van der Stoel
January 1984	Nicaragua	Francisco Javier Chamorro Mora
February 1984	Pakistan	S. Shah Nawaz
March 1984	Peru	Javier Arias Stella
April 1984	(Ukrainian Soviet Socialist Republic) Ukrainian SSR	Volodymyr O. Kravets
May 1984	Soviet Union	Oleg Troyanovsky
June 1984	United Kingdom	John Thomson
July 1984	United States	Jeane Kirkpatrick
August 1984	Upper Volta, from 4 August on as Burkina Faso	Leandre Bassole
September 1984	Zimbabwe	Elleck Mashingaidze
October 1984	Burkina Faso	Basile Laerte Guissou and Leandre Bassole
November 1984	China	Ling Qing
December 1984	Egypt	Ahmed Tawfik Khalil

=== 1985–1989 ===
Presidents from 1985 to 1989:

Dates	State	Name
January 1985	France	Claude de Kemoularia
February 1985	India	Natarajan Krishnan
March 1985	Madagascar	Blaise Rabetafika
April 1985	Peru	Javier Arias Stella
May 1985	Thailand	Birabhongse Kasemsri and Siddhi Savetsila
June 1985	Trinidad and Tobago	Errol Mahabir and D. H. N. Alleyne
July 1985	(Ukrainian Soviet Socialist Republic) Ukrainian SSR	Hennadiy Udovenko
August 1985	Soviet Union	Oleg Troyanovsky
September 1985	United Kingdom	John Thomson and Geoffrey Howe
October 1985	United States	Herbert S. Okun and Vernon A. Walters
November 1985	Australia	Richard Woolcott
December 1985	Burkina Faso	Leandre Bassole
January 1986	China	Luye Li
February 1986	People's Republic of the Congo	Martin Adouki
March 1986	Denmark	Ole Bierring
April 1986	France	Claude de Kemoularia
May 1986	Ghana	James Victor Gbeho
June 1986	Madagascar	Blaise Rabetafika
July 1986	Thailand	Birabhongse Kasemsri
August 1986	Trinidad and Tobago	D. H. N. Alleyne
September 1986	Soviet Union	Alexander Belonogov
October 1986	United Arab Emirates	Mohammed Hussein Al Shaali
November 1986	United Kingdom	John Thomson
December 1986	United States	Vernon A. Walters
January 1987	Venezuela	Andres Aguilar
February 1987	Zambia	Peter D. Zuze
March 1987	Argentina	Marcelo Delpech
April 1987	Bulgaria	Boris Tsvetkov
May 1987	China	Jiahua Huang
June 1987	People's Republic of the Congo	Martin Adouki
July 1987	France	Jean-Bernard Raimond and Pierre-Louis Blanc
August 1987	Federal Republic of Germany	Hans Werner Lautenschlager
September 1987	Ghana	James Victor Gbeho
October 1987	Italy	Maurizio Bucci
November 1987	Japan	Kiyoaki Kikuchi
December 1987	Soviet Union	Alexander Belonogov
January 1988	United Kingdom	Crispin Tickell
February 1988	United States	Herbert S. Okun and Vernon A. Walters
March 1988	Yugoslavia	Dragoslav Pejić
April 1988	Zambia	Peter D. Zuze
May 1988	Algeria	Hocine Djoudi
June 1988	Argentina	Marcelo Delpech
July 1988	Brazil	Paulo Nogueira Batista
August 1988	China	Li Luye
September 1988	France	Pierre-Louis Blanc
October 1988	Federal Republic of Germany	Alexander Graf York von Wartenburg
November 1988	Italy	Mario Scialoja and G. Migliuolo
December 1988	Japan	H. Kagami
January 1989	Malaysia	Razali Ismail
February 1989	Nepal	J. P. Rana
March 1989	Senegal	A. C. Diallo
April 1989	Soviet Union	Alexander Belonogov
May 1989	United Kingdom	Crispin Tickell
June 1989	United States	Thomas R. Pickering
July 1989	Yugoslavia	Dragoslav Pejić
August 1989	Algeria	Hocine Djoudi
September 1989	Brazil	Paulo Nogueira Batista
October 1989	Canada	L. Yves Fortier
November 1989	China	Li Luye
December 1989	Colombia	Enrique Peñalosa Camargo

=== 1990–1994 ===
Presidents from 1990 to 1994:

Dates	State	Name
January 1990	Côte d'Ivoire	Amara Essy
February 1990	Cuba	Ricardo Alarcón
March 1990	(South Yemen) People's Democratic Republic of Yemen	Abdullah Saleh al-Ashtal
April 1990	Ethiopia	Tesfaye Tadessa
May 1990	Finland	Klaus Törnudd
June 1990	France	Pierre-Louis Blanc
July 1990	Malaysia	Razali Ismail
August 1990	Romania	Aurel Dragoș Munteanu
September 1990	Soviet Union	Yuli Mikhailovich Vorontsov and Eduard Shevardnadze
October 1990	United Kingdom	David Hannay
November 1990	United States	Thomas R. Pickering and James Baker
December 1990	Yemen	Abdullah Saleh al-Ashtal
January 1991	Zaire	Bagbeni Adeito Nzengeya
February 1991	Zimbabwe	Simbarashe Mumbengegwi
March 1991	Austria	Peter Hohenfellner
April 1991	Belgium	Paul Noterdaeme
May 1991	China	Li Daoyu
June 1991	Côte d'Ivoire	Jean-Jacques Bechio
July 1991	Cuba	Ricardo Alarcón
August 1991	Ecuador	José Ayala Lasso
September 1991	France	Jean-Bernard Mérimée and Roland Dumas
October 1991	India	Chinmaya Gharekhan
November 1991	Romania	Aurel Dragoș Munteanu
1–25 December 1991	Soviet Union	Yuli Mikhailovich Vorontsov
26–31 December 1991	Russia	Yuli Mikhailovich Vorontsov
January 1992	United Kingdom	David Hannay and John Major
February 1992	United States	Thomas R. Pickering
March 1992	Venezuela	Diego Arria
April 1992	Zimbabwe	Simbarashe Mumbengegwi and Stanislaus Garikai Chigwedere
May 1992	Austria	Peter Hohenfellner
June 1992	Belgium	Paul Noterdaeme
July 1992	Cape Verde	José Luís de Jesus
August 1992	China	Li Daoyu
September 1992	Ecuador	José Ayala Lasso
October 1992	France	Jean-Bernard Mérimée
November 1992	Hungary	Andre Erdos
December 1992	India	Chinmaya Gharekhan
January 1993	Japan	Yoshio Hatano
February 1993	Morocco	Ahmed Snoussi
March 1993	New Zealand	Terence Christopher O'Brien and Donald Charles McKinnon
April 1993	Pakistan	Jamsheed Marker
May 1993	Russia	Yuli Mikhailovich Vorontsov
June 1993	Spain	Juan Antonio Yáñez-Barnuevo
July 1993	United Kingdom	David Hannay and Mr. Richardson (Note: Listed as 'Mr. Richardson' in the official document, without a given name)
August 1993	United States	Madeleine Albright
September 1993	Venezuela	Adolfo Taylhardat
October 1993	Brazil	Ronaldo Mota Sardenberg
November 1993	Cape Verde; China	José Luís de Jesus; Li Zhaoxing
December 1993	China	Li Zhaoxing
January 1994	Czech Republic	Karel Kovanda
February 1994	Djibouti	Roble Olhaye
March 1994	France	Jean-Bernard Mérimée
April 1994	New Zealand	Colin Keating and Donald Charles McKinnon
May 1994	Nigeria	Ibrahim Gambari and Baba Gana Kingibe
June 1994	Oman	Salim Bin Mohammed Al-Kussaiby
July 1994	Pakistan	Jamsheed Marker
August 1994	Russia	Yuli Mikhailovich Vorontsov
September 1994	Spain	Juan Antonio Yáñez-Barnuevo and Francisco Javier Solana de Madariaga
October 1994	United Kingdom	David Hannay
November 1994	United States	Madeleine Albright
December 1994	Rwanda	Manzi Bakuramutsa

=== 1995–1999 ===
Presidents from 1995 to 1999:

Dates	State	Name
January 1995	Argentina	Emilio Cárdenas
February 1995	Botswana	Joseph Legwaila and Mompati Merafhe
March 1995	China	Li Zhaoxing and Xuexian Wang
April 1995	Czech Republic	Karel Kovanda and Alexandr Vondra
May 1995	France	Jean-Bernard Mérimée
June 1995	Germany	Detlev Graf zu Rantzau
July 1995	Honduras	Gerardo Martínez Blanco and Delmer Urbizio Panting
August 1995	Indonesia	Nugroho Wisnumurti
September 1995	Italy	Francesco Paolo Fulci and Susanna Agnelli
October 1995	Nigeria	Ibrahim Gambari
November 1995	Oman	Salim bin Mohammed Al-Khussaiby
December 1995	Russia	Sergey Lavrov
January 1996	United Kingdom	John Weston
February 1996	United States	Madeleine Albright
March 1996	Botswana	Joseph Legwaila
April 1996	Chile	Juan Somavía
May 1996	China	Huasun Qin
June 1996	Egypt	Nabil Elaraby
July 1996	France	Alain Dejammet
August 1996	Germany	Antonius Eitel
September 1996	Guinea-Bissau	Alfredo Lopes Cabral
October 1996	Honduras	Delmer Urbizio Panting and Gerardo Martínez Blanco
November 1996	Indonesia	Nugroho Wisnumurti
December 1996	Italy	Francesco Paolo Fulci
January 1997	Japan	Hisashi Owada
February 1997	Kenya	Njuguna M. Mahugu
March 1997	Poland	Zbigniew M. Włosowicz
April 1997	Portugal	António Monteiro
May 1997	South Korea	Park Soo Gil and Chong Ha Yoo
June 1997	Russia	Sergey Lavrov
July 1997	Sweden	Peter Osvald and Lena Hjelm-Wallén
August 1997	United Kingdom	John Weston
September 1997	United States	William B. Richardson and Madeleine Albright
October 1997	Chile	Juan Somavía
November 1997	China	Huasun Qin
December 1997	Costa Rica	Fernando Berrocal Soto
January 1998	France	Alain Dejammet
February 1998	Gabon	Casimir Oyé-Mba and Denis Dangue Réwaka
March 1998	Gambia	Momodou Lamin Sedat Jobe and Abdoulie Momodou Sallah
April 1998	Japan	Hisashi Owada
May 1998	Kenya	Njuguna Mahugu and Bonaya Godana
June 1998	Portugal	António Monteiro and Jaime Gama
July 1998	Russia	Sergey Lavrov
August 1998	Slovenia	Danilo Türk
September 1998	Sweden	Lena Hjelm-Wallén and Hans Dalgren
October 1998	United Kingdom	Jeremy Greenstock
November 1998	United States	Peter Burleigh
December 1998	Bahrain	Jassim Mohammed Buallay
January 1999	Brazil	Celso Amorim
February 1999	Canada	Robert R. Fowler and Lloyd Axworthy
March 1999	China	Qin Huasun
April 1999	France	Alain Dejammet
May 1999	Gabon	Denis Dangue Réwaka
June 1999	Gambia	Baboucarr-Blaise Jagne
July 1999	Malaysia	Syed Hamid Albar and Agam Hasmy
August 1999	Namibia	Martin Andjaba and Theo-Ben Gurirab
September 1999	Netherlands	Peter van Walsum and Jozias van Aartsen
October 1999	Russia	Sergey Lavrov
November 1999	Slovenia	Danilo Türk and Boris Frlec
December 1999	United Kingdom	Jeremy Greenstock and Peter Hain

=== 2000–2004 ===
Presidents from 2000 to 2004:

Dates	State	Name
January 2000	United States	Al Gore, Richard Holbrooke, and Madeleine Albright
February 2000	Argentina	Arnoldo Manuel Listre and Adalberto Rodríguez Giavarini
March 2000	Bangladesh	Anwarul Karim Chowdhury and Abdus Samad Azad
April 2000	Canada	Lloyd Axworthy and Robert Fowler
May 2000	China	Wang Yingfan
June 2000	France	Jean-David Levitte
July 2000	Jamaica	Patricia Durrant and Paul Robertson
August 2000	Malaysia	Agam Hasmy
September 2000	Mali	Moctar Ouane and Alpha Oumar Konaré
October 2000	Namibia	Martin Andjaba and Theo-Ben Gurirab
November 2000	Netherlands	Peter van Walsum, Jozias van Aartsen, and Eveline Herfkens
December 2000	Russia	Sergey Lavrov
January 2001	Singapore	Kishore Mahbubani and S. Jayakumar
February 2001	Tunisia	Said Ben Mustapha and Habib Ben Yahia
March 2001	Ukraine	Valeriy P. Kuchinsky, Volodymyr Yelchenko, and Anatoliy Zlenko
April 2001	United Kingdom	Jeremy Greenstock
May 2001	United States	James B. Cunningham
June 2001	Bangladesh	Anwarul Karim Chowdhury and Abdus Samad Azad
July 2001	China	Wang Yingfan
August 2001	Colombia	Guillermo Fernández de Soto and Alfonso Valdivieso Sarmiento
September 2001	France	Jean-David Levitte
October 2001	Ireland	Richard Ryan and Brian Cowen
November 2001	Jamaica	Patricia Durrant, P. J. Patterson, and Keith D. Knight
December 2001	Mali	Moctar Ouane
January 2002	Mauritius	Jagdish Koonjul and Anil Gayan
February 2002	Mexico	Adolfo Aguilar Zínser
March 2002	Norway	Ole Peter Kolby and Jan Petersen
April 2002	Russia	Sergey Lavrov
May 2002	Singapore	Kishore Mahbubani and S. Jayakumar
June 2002	Syria	Mikhail Wehbe and Farouk al-Sharaa
July 2002	United Kingdom	Jeremy Greenstock and Valerie Amos
August 2002	United States	John Negroponte and James B. Cunningham
September 2002	Bulgaria	Solomon Passy, Stefan Tafrov, Georgi Parvanov, and Rayko Strahilov Raytchev
October 2002	Cameroon	Martin Belinga Eboutou
November 2002	China	Zhang Yishan and Wang Yingfan
December 2002	Colombia	Alfonso Valdivieso Sarmiento and Carolina Barco
January 2003	France	Jean-Marc de La Sablière and Dominique de Villepin
February 2003	Germany	Gunter Pleuger and Joschka Fischer
March 2003	Guinea	François Lonseny Fall and Mamady Traore
April 2003	Mexico	Adolfo Aguilar Zínser and Luis Ernesto Derbez
May 2003	Pakistan	Munir Akram and Khurshid Mahmud Kasuri
June 2003	Russia	Sergey Lavrov
July 2003	Spain	Inocencio Arias, Ana Menendez, and Ana Palacio
August 2003	Syria	Mikhail Wehbe and Faisal Meqdad
September 2003	United Kingdom	Emyr Jones Parry and Jack Straw
October 2003	United States	John Negroponte and James B. Cunningham
November 2003	Angola	Gaspar Martins
December 2003	Bulgaria	Stefan Tafrov and Solomon Passy
January 2004	Chile	Heraldo Muñoz and Soledad Alvear
February 2004	China	Wang Guangya
March 2004	France	Jean-Marc de La Sablière and Pierre-André Wiltzer
April 2004	Germany	Gunter Pleuger and Kerstin Müller
May 2004	Pakistan	Munir Akram and Khurshid Mahmud Kasuri
June 2004	Philippines	Lauro L. Baja Jr. and Delia Albert
July 2004	Romania	Mihnea Motoc, Adrian Năstase, and Mircea Geoană
August 2004	Russia	Andrey Denisov
September 2004	Spain	Juan Antonio Yáñez-Barnuevo and Miguel Ángel Moratinos
October 2004	United Kingdom	Emyr Jones Parry, Bill Rammell, and Adam Thomson
November 2004	United States	John Danforth and Anne W. Patterson
December 2004	Algeria	Abdallah Baali and Abdelaziz Belkhadem

=== 2005–2009 ===
Dates	State	Name
January 2005	Argentina	César Mayoral and Rafael Bielsa
February 2005	Benin	Joel W. Adechi and Rogatien Biaou
March 2005	Brazil	Ronaldo Mota Sardenberg
April 2005	China	Wang Guangya and Zhang Yishan
May 2005	Denmark	Ellen Margrethe Løj, Lars Faaborg-Andersen, and Per Stig Møller
June 2005	France	Jean-Marc de La Sablière, Michel Duclos, and Brigitte Collet
July 2005	Greece	Adamantios Vassilakis
August 2005	Japan	Kenzo Oshima
September 2005	Philippines	Lauro L. Baja Jr. and Bayani Mercado
October 2005	Romania	Mihnea Motoc and Mihai Răzvan Ungureanu
November 2005	Russia	Andrey Denisov
December 2005	United Kingdom	Emyr Jones Parry
January 2006	United Republic of Tanzania	Augustine P. Mahiga
February 2006	United States	John R. Bolton
March 2006	Argentina	César Mayoral
April 2006	China	Wang Guangya
May 2006	Republic of the Congo	Basile Ikouébé and Pascal Gayama
June 2006	Denmark	Ellen Margrethe Løj
July 2006	France	Jean-Marc de La Sablière
August 2006	Ghana	Nana Effah-Apenteng
September 2006	Greece	Adamantios Vassilakis
October 2006	Japan	Kenzo Oshima
November 2006	Peru	Jorge Voto-Bernales
December 2006	Qatar	Nassir Abdulaziz Al-Nasser and Mutlaq Majed al-Qahtani
January 2007	Russia	Vitaly Churkin
February 2007	Slovakia	Peter Burian
March 2007	South Africa	Dumisani Kumalo
April 2007	United Kingdom	Emyr Jones Parry and Karen Pierce
May 2007	United States	Zalmay Khalilzad and Alejandro Daniel Wolff
June 2007	Belgium	Johan C. Verbeke
July 2007	China	Wang Guangya
August 2007	Republic of the Congo	Pascal Gayama
September 2007	France	Jean-Maurice Ripert and Bernard Kouchner
October 2007	Ghana	Leslie K. Christian
November 2007	Indonesia	Marty Natalegawa
December 2007	Italy	Marcello Spatafora
January 2008	Libya	Giadalla Ettalhi
February 2008	Panama	Ricardo Alberto Arias
March 2008	Russia	Vitaly Churkin
April 2008	South Africa	Dumisani Kumalo
May 2008	United Kingdom	Karen Pierce
June 2008	United States	Zalmay Khalilzad and Alejandro Daniel Wolff
July 2008	Vietnam	Lê Lương Minh
August 2008	Belgium	Jan Grauls
September 2008	Burkina Faso	Michel Kafando, Blaise Compaoré and Alain Bédouma Yoda
October 2008	China	Zhang Yesui and Liu Zhenmin
November 2008	Costa Rica	Jorge Urbina, Óscar Arias Sánchez, Saúl Weisleder, and Jorge Ballestero
December 2008	Croatia	Neven Jurica, Stjepan Mesić, and Ivo Sanader
January 2009	France	Jean-Maurice Ripert, Bernard Kouchner, and Jean-Pierre Lacroix
February 2009	Japan	Yukio Takasu
March 2009	Libya	Ibrahim Dabbashi and Abdurrahman Mohamed Shalgham
April 2009	Mexico	Claude Heller and Patricia Espinosa
May 2009	Russia	Vitaly Churkin and Sergey Lavrov
June 2009	Turkey	Baki İlkin and Ahmet Davutoğlu
July 2009	Uganda	Ruhakana Rugunda and Sam Kutesa
August 2009	United Kingdom	John Sawers
September 2009	United States	Susan Rice, Barack Obama, Rosemary DiCarlo, and Hillary Clinton
October 2009	Vietnam	Lê Lương Minh
November 2009	Austria	Thomas Mayr-Harting
December 2009	Burkina Faso	Michel Kafando

=== 2010–2014 ===
Dates	State	Name
January 2010	China	Zhang Yesui
February 2010	France	Gérard Araud
March 2010	Gabon	Emmanuel Issoze-Ngondet
April 2010	Japan	Yukio Takasu
May 2010	Lebanon	Nawaf Salam
June 2010	Mexico	Claude Heller
July 2010	Nigeria	Joy Ogwu
August 2010	Russia	Vitaly Churkin
September 2010	Turkey	Ertuğrul Apakan, Abdullah Gül, and Ahmet Davutoğlu
October 2010	Uganda	Ruhakana Rugunda
November 2010	United Kingdom	Mark Lyall Grant
December 2010	United States	Susan Rice and Brooke D. Anderson
January 2011	Bosnia and Herzegovina	Ivan Barbalić
February 2011	Brazil	Maria Luiza Ribeiro Viotti
March 2011	China	Li Baodong
April 2011	Colombia	Juan Manuel Santos and Néstor Osorio Londoño
May 2011	France	Gérard Araud
June 2011	Gabon	Ali Bongo Ondimba, Alfred Moungara Moussotsi, and Emmanuel Issoze-Ngondet
July 2011	Germany	Peter Wittig and Guido Westerwelle
August 2011	India	Hardeep Singh Puri
September 2011	Lebanon	Nawaf Salam, Michel Suleiman, and Najib Mikati
October 2011	Nigeria	Joy Ogwu
November 2011	Portugal	José Filipe Moraes Cabral
December 2011	Russia	Vitaly Churkin
January 2012	South Africa	Baso Sangqu
February 2012	Togo	Kodjo Menan
March 2012	United Kingdom	Mark Lyall Grant
April 2012	United States	Susan Rice
May 2012	Azerbaijan	Agshin Mehdiyev and Ilham Aliyev
June 2012	China	Li Baodong and Wang Min
July 2012	Colombia	Néstor Osorio Londoño
August 2012	France	Gérard Araud
September 2012	Germany	Peter Wittig
October 2012	Guatemala	Gert Rosenthal and Harold Caballeros
November 2012	India	Hardeep Singh Puri
December 2012	Morocco	Mohammed Loulichki and Saad-Eddine El Othmani
January 2013	Pakistan	Masood Khan and Hina Rabbani Khar
February 2013	Republic of Korea	Kim Sook and Kim Sung-hwan
March 2013	Russia	Vitaly Churkin
April 2013	Rwanda	Eugène-Richard Gasana and Louise Mushikiwabo
May 2013	Togo	Kodjo Menan
June 2013	United Kingdom	Mark Lyall Grant
July 2013	United States	Rosemary DiCarlo
August 2013	Argentina	María Perceval and Agustín Rossi
September 2013	Australia	Gary Quinlan and Julie Bishop
October 2013	Azerbaijan	Agshin Mehdiyev and Elmar Mammadyarov
November 2013	China	Liu Jieyi
December 2013	France	Gérard Araud and Alexis Lamek
January 2014	Jordan	Zeid Ra'ad Zeid Al-Hussein
February 2014	Lithuania	Raimonda Murmokaitė and Linas Antanas Linkevičius
March 2014	Luxembourg	Sylvie Lucas
April 2014	Nigeria	Joy Ogwu
May 2014	South Korea	Oh Joon
June 2014	Russian Federation	Vitaly Churkin
July 2014	Rwanda	Eugène-Richard Gasana
August 2014	United Kingdom	Mark Lyall Grant
September 2014	United States	Samantha Power
October 2014	Argentina	María Cristina Perceval
November 2014	Australia	Gary Quinlan
December 2014	Chad	Mahamat Zene Cherif

=== 2015–2019 ===
Dates	State	Name
January 2015	Chile	Cristian Barros
February 2015	China	Liu Jieyi
March 2015	France	François Delattre
April 2015	Jordan	Dina Kawar
May 2015	Lithuania	Raimonda Murmokaitė
June 2015	Malaysia	Ramlan Bin Ibrahim
July 2015	New Zealand	Gerard van Bohemen
August 2015	Nigeria	Joy Ogwu
September 2015	Russian Federation	Vitaly Churkin
October 2015	Spain	Román Oyarzun Marchesi
November 2015	United Kingdom	Matthew Rycroft
December 2015	United States	Samantha Power
January 2016	Uruguay	Elbio Rosselli
February 2016	Venezuela	Rafael Ramírez Carreño
March 2016	Angola	Gaspar Martins
April 2016	China	Liu Jieyi
May 2016	Egypt	Amr Abdellatif Aboulatta
June 2016	France	François Delattre
July 2016	Japan	Koro Bessho
August 2016	Malaysia	Ramlan Bin Ibrahim and Ahmad Zahid Hamidi
September 2016	New Zealand	Gerard van Bohemen and John Key
October 2016	Russian Federation	Vitaly Churkin
November 2016	Senegal	Fodé Seck
December 2016	Spain	Román Oyarzun Marchesi
January 2017	Sweden	Olof Skoog
February 2017	Ukraine	Volodymyr Yelchenko
March 2017	United Kingdom	Matthew Rycroft
April 2017	United States	Nikki Haley
May 2017	Uruguay	Elbio Rosselli
June 2017	Bolivia	Sacha Llorenty
July 2017	China	Liu Jieyi
August 2017	Egypt	Amr Abdellatif Aboulatta
September 2017	Ethiopia	Tekeda Alemu
October 2017	France	François Delattre
November 2017	Italy	Sebastiano Cardi
December 2017	Japan	Koro Bessho
January 2018	Kazakhstan	Kairat Umarov
February 2018	Kuwait	Mansour Ayyad Al-Otaibi
March 2018	Netherlands	Karel van Oosterom, Sigrid Kaag, Stef Blok and Mark Rutte
April 2018	Peru	Gustavo Meza-Cuadra
May 2018	Poland	Joanna Wronecka, Andrzej Duda and Jacek Czaputowicz
June 2018	Russian Federation	Vasily Nebenzya
July 2018	Sweden	Olof Skoog
August 2018	United Kingdom	Karen Pierce
September 2018	United States	Nikki Haley, Donald Trump, Mike Pompeo
October 2018	Bolivia	Sacha Llorenty
November 2018	China	Ma Zhaoxu
December 2018	Côte D'Ivoire	Kacou Houadja Léon Adom, Alassane Ouattara
January 2019	Dominican Republic	José Singer Weisinger, Danilo Medina
February 2019	Equatorial Guinea	Anatolio Ndong Mba, Teodoro Obiang Nguema Mbasogo
March 2019	France	François Delattre
April 2019	Germany	Christoph Heusgen
May 2019	Indonesia	Dian Triansyah Djani, Retno Marsudi
June 2019	Kuwait	Mansour Al-Otaibi, Sabah Al-Khalid Al-Sabah
July 2019	Peru	Gustavo Meza-Cuadra, Néstor Bardales
August 2019	Poland	Joanna Wronecka
September 2019	Russian Federation	Vasily Nebenzya
October 2019	South Africa	Jerry Matthews Matjila
November 2019	United Kingdom	Karen Pierce
December 2019	United States	Kelly Craft

=== 2020–2024 ===
Dates	State	Name
January 2020	Vietnam	Đặng Đình Quý and Phạm Bình Minh
February 2020	Belgium	Marc Pecsteen de Buytswerve
March 2020	China	Zhang Jun
April 2020	Dominican Republic	José Singer Weisinger
May 2020	Estonia	Sven Jürgenson
June 2020	France	Nicolas de Rivière
July 2020	Germany	Christoph Heusgen
August 2020	Indonesia	Dian Triansyah Djani, Muhsin Syihab
September 2020	Niger	Abdou Abarry
October 2020	Russian Federation	Vasily Nebenzya
November 2020	Saint Vincent and the Grenadines	Inga Rhonda King
December 2020	South Africa	Jerry Matthews Matjila
January 2021	Tunisia	Tarek Ladeb
February 2021	United Kingdom	Barbara Woodward
March 2021	United States	Linda Thomas-Greenfield
April 2021	Vietnam	Đặng Đình Quý, Nguyễn Xuân Phúc and Bùi Thanh Sơn
May 2021	China	Zhang Jun
June 2021	Estonia	Sven Jürgenson
July 2021	France	Nicolas de Rivière and Jean-Yves Le Drian
August 2021	India	T. S. Tirumurti and S. Jaishankar
September 2021	Ireland	Geraldine Byrne Nason, Micheál Martin and Simon Coveney
October 2021	Kenya	Martin Kimani and Raychelle Omamo
November 2021	Mexico	Juan Ramón de la Fuente Ramírez, Marcelo Ebrard and Andrés Manuel López Obrador
December 2021	Niger	Abdou Abarry
January 2022	Norway	Mona Juul and Anniken Huitfeldt
February 2022	Russian Federation	Vasily Nebenzya
March 2022	United Arab Emirates	Lana Zaki Nusseibeh
April 2022	United Kingdom	Barbara Woodward
May 2022	United States	Linda Thomas-Greenfield
June 2022	Albania	Ferit Hoxha, Albana Dautllari, Olta Xhaçka and Edi Rama
July 2022	Brazil	Ronaldo Costa Filho
August 2022	China	Zhang Jun
September 2022	France	Nicolas de Rivière and Catherine Colonna
October 2022	Gabon	Michel Xavier Biang and Michael Moussa-Adamo
November 2022	Ghana	Harold Adlai Agyeman
December 2022	India	Ruchira Kamboj
January 2023	Japan	Ishikane Kimihiro
February 2023	Malta	Vanessa Frazier
March 2023	Mozambique	Pedro Comissário Afonso
April 2023	Russian Federation	Vasily Nebenzya
May 2023	Switzerland	Pascale Baeriswyl
June 2023	United Arab Emirates	Lana Zaki Nusseibeh
July 2023	United Kingdom	Barbara Woodward
August 2023	United States	Linda Thomas-Greenfield and Robert A. Wood
September 2023	Albania	Ferit Hoxha and Edi Rama
October 2023	Brazil	Sérgio França Danese
November 2023	China	Zhang Jun
December 2023	Ecuador	José de la Gasca
January 2024	France	Nicolas de Rivière
February 2024	Guyana	Carolyn Rodrigues
March 2024	Japan	Yamazaki Kazuyuki
April 2024	Malta	Vanessa Frazier
May 2024	Mozambique	Pedro Comissário Afonso
June 2024	South Korea	Hwang Joon-kook
July 2024	Russian Federation	Vasily Nebenzya
August 2024	Sierra Leone	Michael Imran Kanu
September 2024	Slovenia	Samuel Žbogar
October 2024	Switzerland	Pascale Baeriswyl
November 2024	United Kingdom	Barbara Woodward
December 2024	United States	Linda Thomas-Greenfield, Dorothy Shea and Robert A. Wood

=== 2025–2029 ===
Dates	State	Name
January 2025	Algeria	Amar Bendjama
February 2025	China	Fu Cong
March 2025	Denmark	Christina Markus Lassen
April 2025	France	Jérôme Bonnafont
May 2025	Greece	Evangelos C. Sekeris
June 2025	Guyana	Carolyn Rodrigues
July 2025	Pakistan	Asim Iftikhar Ahmad, Ishaq Dar
August 2025	Panama	Eloy Alfaro de Alba, José Raúl Mulino
September 2025	South Korea	Hwang Joon-kook
October 2025	Russian Federation	Vasily Nebenzya
November 2025	Sierra Leone	Michael Imran Kanu
December 2025	Slovenia	Samuel Žbogar
January 2026	Somalia	Abukar Dahir Osman
February 2026	United Kingdom	James Kariuki
March 2026	United States	Melania Trump, Mike Waltz
April 2026	Bahrain	Jamal Fares Alrowaiei
May 2026	China	Fu Cong
June 2026	Colombia	Leonor Zalabata
July 2026	Democratic Republic of the Congo	Zénon Mukongo Ngay
August 2026	Denmark	Christina Markus Lassen
September 2026	France	Jérôme Bonnafont
October 2026	Greece	Aglaia Balta
November 2026	Latvia	Sanita Pavluta-Deslandes
December 2026	Liberia	Lewis Garseedah Brown II
January 2027	Portugal	Rui Manuel Vinhas Tavares Gabriel
February 2027	Russian Federation	Vasily Nebenzya
March 2027	Trinidad and Tobago	Nel Nadesh Parsan
April 2027	United Kingdom	Sarah MacIntosh
May 2027	United States	Mike Waltz
June 2027	Zimbabwe	Taonga Mushayavanhu
July 2027	Austria	Gregor Kössler
August 2027	Bahrain	Jamal Fares Alrowaiei
September 2027	China	Fu Cong
October 2027	Colombia	Mauricio Gaona
November 2027	Democratic Republic of the Congo	
December 2027	France	

=== Unusual circumstances ===
In 1961, the United Arab Republic (then a union of Egypt and Syria) was elected to the Security Council. Syria seceded from the union while it was still on the Security Council, but Egypt's official name remained the United Arab Republic and it was unaffected.

In August 1984, Upper Volta changed its name to Burkina Faso while president of the Security Council. The rest of its term was unaffected and rotated normally to Zimbabwe in September 1984. Afterward, Burkina Faso was first in English alphabetical order and it became president of the Security Council for a second time that year in October 1984.

In March 1990, South Yemen (officially the People's Democratic Republic of Yemen under D) served as president of the Security Council. Yemeni unification with North Yemen took place in May 1990, with both Yemens being treated as successor states under the name Yemen. After the term of the United States rotated out in November 1990, Yemen served as president of the Security Council for a second time that year in December 1990.

In December 1991, the Union of Soviet Socialist Republics was replaced by the Russian Federation while president of the Security Council. By coincidence, the alphabetical order was unaffected, the surrounding members being Romania and the United Kingdom.

Rwanda was elected to the Security Council in 1994 and was due to serve its term as president in September 1994; however, its government was overthrown in July 1994 and the replacement government did not appoint a United Nations representative in August 1994. As a result, its term was temporarily skipped and Spain (which was due to serve in October) served in September instead. Rwanda would serve its term at the end of that alphabetical rotation.

== See also ==
- President of the United Nations General Assembly
- President of the United Nations Economic and Social Council

== Bibliography ==
- Bailey, Sydney Dawson; Daws, Sam (1998). The Procedure of the UN Security Council (3rd ed.). New York: Oxford University Press. ISBN 0-19-828073-4.
- Kelsen, Hans (1950). The Law of the United Nations: A Critical Analysis of Its Fundamental Problems. New York: F.A. Praeger.
- Luck, Edward C. (2006). The UN Security Council: A Primer. New York: Routledge. ISBN 0-415-35531-1.
- Nicol, Davidson, ed. (1981). Paths to peace: the UN Security Council and its presidency. Pergamon Press. ISBN 978-0-08-026322-9.
  - Nicol, Davidson (1981). "The Security Council". In Nicol, Davidson (ed.). Paths to Peace: The UN Security Council and Its Presidency. Pergamon Press. pp. 3–36. ISBN 978-0-08-026322-9.
  - Bailey, Sydney D. (1981). "The Evolution of the Practice of the Security Council". In Nicol, Davidson (ed.). Paths to Peace: The UN Security Council and Its Presidency. Pergamon Press. pp. 37–47. ISBN 978-0-08-026322-9.
  - Chai, F. Y. (1981). "The Evolution of the Practice of the Security Council". In Nicol, Davidson (ed.). The Scope of Consensus. Pergamon Press. pp. 48–64. ISBN 978-0-08-026322-9.
  - Bishara, Abdalla (1981). "The Vietnam-China-Kampuchea [Cambodia] Conflict, 1979". In Nicol, Davidson (ed.). The Scope of Consensus. Pergamon Press. pp. 67–73. ISBN 978-0-08-026322-9.
- Pogany, Istvan (1982). "The Role of the President of the U. N. Security Council". The International and Comparative Law Quarterly. 31 (2): 231–245. doi:10.1093/iclqaj/31.2.231. ISSN 0020-5893. JSTOR 759131.
- Sievers, Loraine; Daws, Sam (2015). The procedure of the UN Security Council. doi:10.1093/acprof:osobl/9780199685295.001.0001. ISBN 978-0-19-180374-1. OCLC 1013608149.
