= Sylvie Lucas =

Luxembourgish diplomat (born 1965)

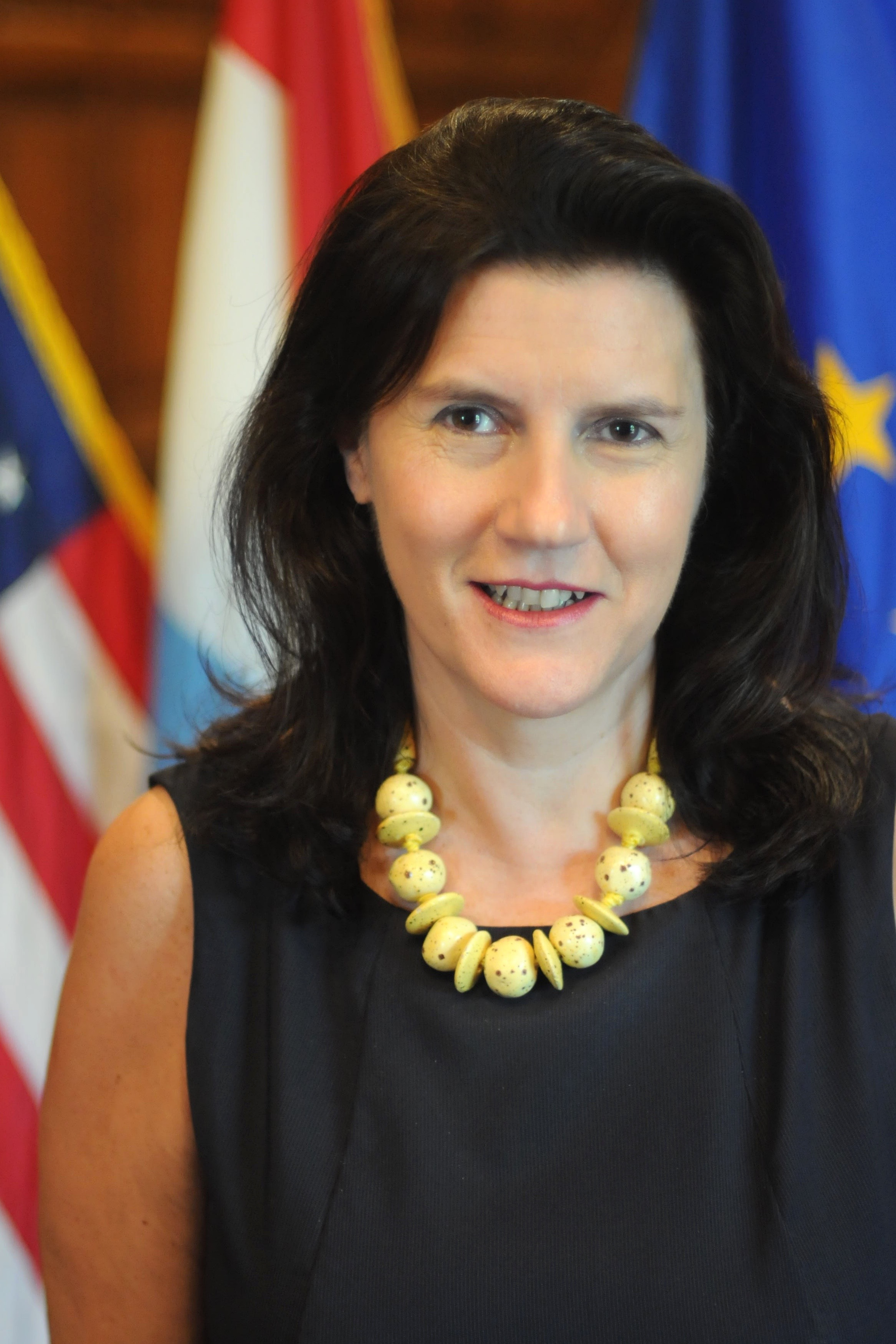
Lucas in September 2016

Sylvie Lucas (born 30 June 1965) is a Luxembourgish diplomat who served as Luxembourg's ambassador to the United States from 2016 to 2019, having previously served as permanent representative to the United Nations from August 2008 to August 2016 and president of the United Nations Economic and Social Council (ECOSOC) (2009–2010) and the Security Council (2014).

== Education ==
In 1988, Lucas received a master's degree in history from the Université des Sciences Humaines (University of Social Sciences) (now the University of Strasbourg) and, in 1989, a master's degree in political science and administration from the College of Europe in Bruges, Belgium.

== Diplomatic career ==
From 1990 to 1995, Lucas worked at the Luxembourg Ministry for Foreign Affairs, first for a year in the Department of Political and Cultural Affairs, and then in the Department of International Relations and Economic Affairs. From 1995 to 2000 she was the deputy permanent representative of Luxembourg to the United Nations. She then returned to the Department of Political Affairs as deputy director from 2000 to 2003.

In 2003, Lucas became Luxembourg's ambassador to Portugal and Cape Verde. In 2004 she again returned to the Department of Political Affairs, this time as director. On 25 August 2008, ambassador Lucas became the United Nations' permanent representative from Luxembourg. In September 2008, she was elected vice-president of ECOSOC to fill the unexpired term of ambassador Jean-Marc Hoscheit who had left the UN. On 15 January 2009, she was elected to a one-year term as president of ECOSOC.

On 21 November 2016, Lucas presented her credentials as ambassador to Canada.

Diplomatic posts
| Preceded by Paul Dühr | Ambassador of Luxembourg to Portugal and Cape Verde; 2003 – 2004 | Succeeded by Alain de Muyser |
| Preceded by Jean-Marc Hoscheit | Permanent Representative of Luxembourg to the United Nations; 2008 – 2016 | Succeeded by Christian Braun |
| Preceded by Hamidon Ali | President of the United Nations Economic and Social Council; 2009 | Succeeded by Leo Merores |
| Preceded by Raimonda Murmokaitė | President of the United Nations Security Council; March 2014 | Succeeded by Joy Ogwu |
| Preceded by Jean-Louis Wolzfeld | Ambassador of Luxembourg to the United States; 2016 – 2019 | Succeeded by Gaston Stronck |
