= Kenzo Oshima =

Japanese diplomat (1943–2021)

- 大島賢三
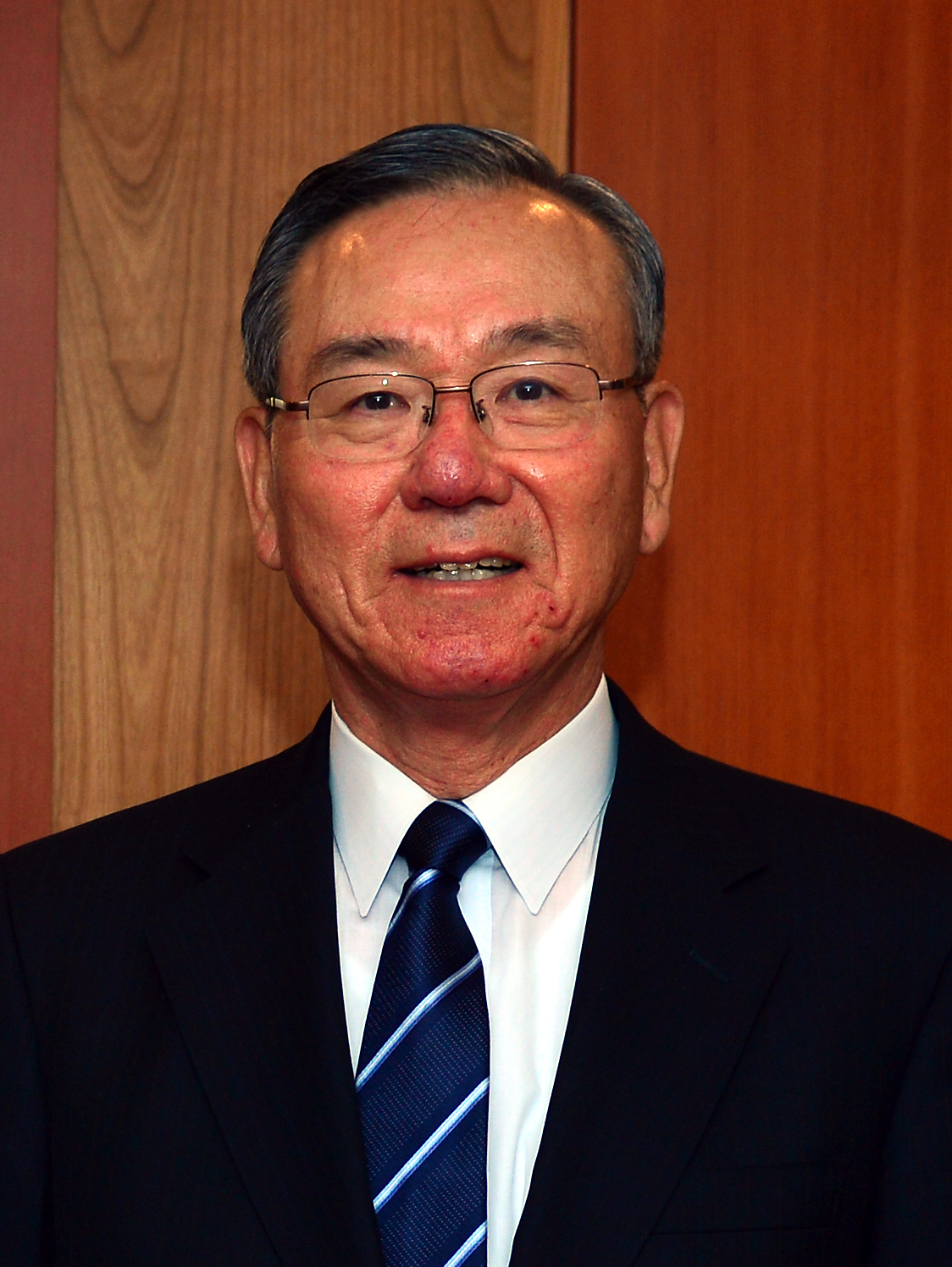

Under-Secretary-General for Humanitarian Affairs and Emergency Relief Coordinator
- In office January 2001 – June 2003
- Preceded by: Sérgio Vieira de Mello
- Succeeded by: Jan Egeland

Personal details
- Born: 14 May 1943 Hiroshima, Japan
- Died: 29 May 2021 (aged 78)
- Education: University of Tokyo

Kenzo Oshima (大島 賢三, Ōshima Kenzō; 14 May 1943 – 29 May 2021) was a Japanese diplomat who served as Permanent Representative to the United Nations from 2004 to 2007.

== Biography ==
Oshima was the recipient of a law degree from the University of Tokyo before joining the Ministry of Foreign Affairs in 1967. During his early diplomatic career he was posted abroad to France, India, Australia, and the Permanent Mission of Japan to the United Nations headquarters in New York City. From 1999, he was Secretary-General of the Secretariat for the International Peace Cooperation Headquarters in the Prime Minister's Office, where he oversaw Japan's peacekeeping and humanitarian assistance program.

In mid-January 2001, Secretary-General Kofi Annan appointed him Under-Secretary-General for Humanitarian Affairs. He served in that position before serving as Japanese ambassador to Australia from September 2003 to December 2004. He was also Permanent Representative to the United Nations from 2004 to 2007.

On a personal level, Oshima took the issue of Chernobyl to heart, being a Hiroshima survivor. In his capacity as United Nations Coordinator of International Cooperation on Chernobyl, he launched the report The Human Consequences of the Chernobyl Nuclear Accident: A Strategy for Recovery.

He was married and had two children.

Oshima died of a heart attack on May 29, 2021, at the age of 78.

Positions in intergovernmental organisations
Preceded by Sérgio Vieira de Mello ( (Brazil) )	Under-Secretary-General for Humanitarian Affairs and Emergency Relief Coordinator; 2001–2003	Succeeded by Jan Egeland ( (Norway) )
Diplomatic posts
Preceded by Koichi Haraguchi	Permanent Representative to the United Nations; 2004–2007	Succeeded by Yukio Takasu
