= Letter of credence =

Letter granting (diplomatic) accreditation

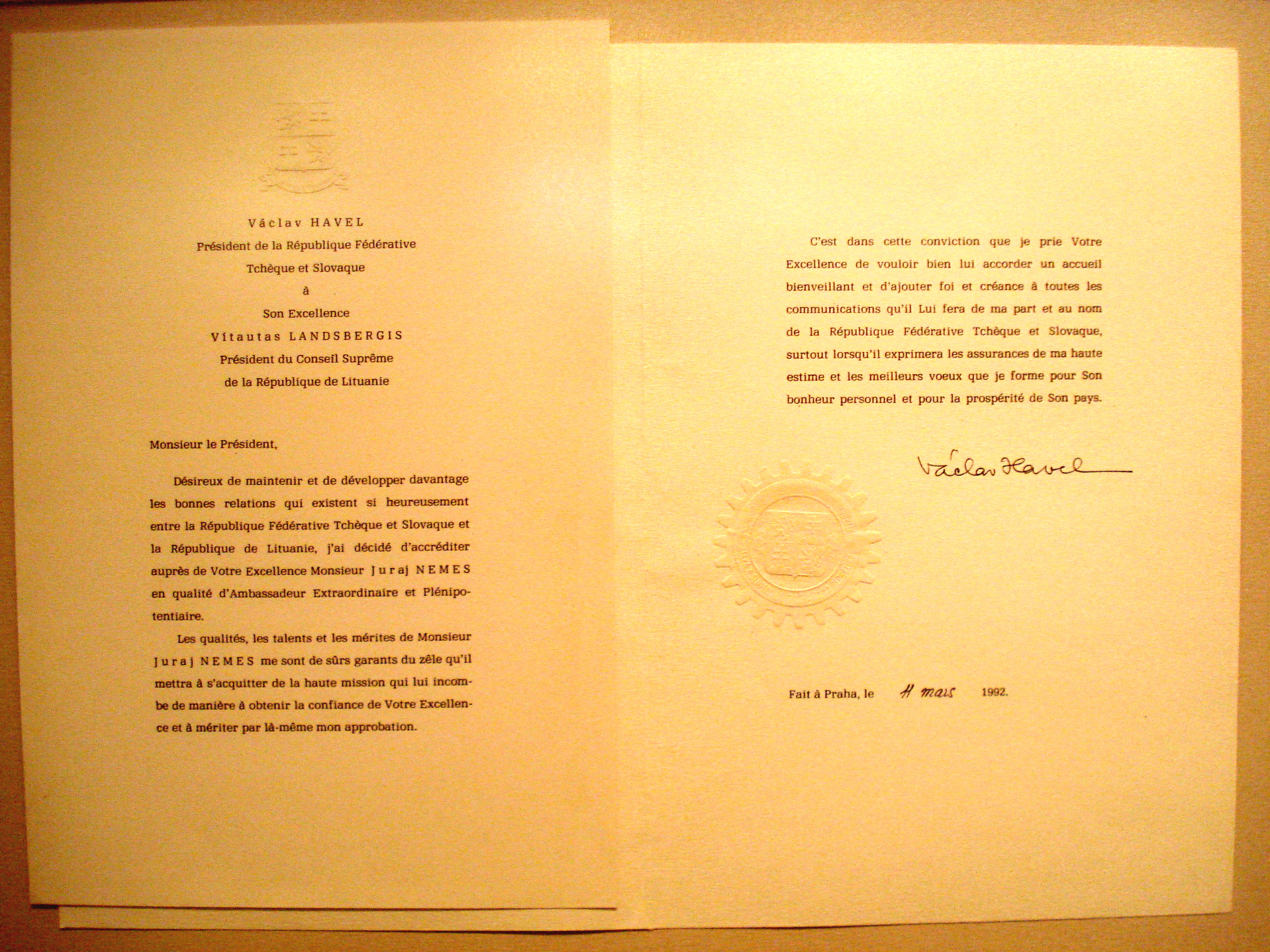
Letter of credence for the Czechoslovak Ambassador to Lithuania (1992), written in the traditional French and signed by President Václav Havel

A letter of credence (French: lettre de créance, [lɛtʁ də kʁeɑ̃s]) is a formal diplomatic letter that designates a diplomat as ambassador to another sovereign state. Commonly known as diplomatic credentials, the letter is addressed from one head of state to another, asking them to give "credence" (French: créance) to the ambassador's claim of speaking for their country. The letter is presented personally by the ambassador-designate to the receiving head of state in a formal ceremony, marking the beginning of the ambassadorship.

The equivalent correspondence ending the ambassador's term is the letter of recall (lettre de rappel).

Letters of credence and of recall are traditionally written in French, the lingua franca of diplomacy. However, they may also be written in the official language of the sending state.

== Language of letters ==
Letters of credence between two monarchs of equal rank will typically begin with the salutation "Sir My Brother" (or "Madame My Sister", in the case of a female monarch) and close with the valediction "Your Good Brother" (or "Sister", in the case of a female monarch).

== Presentation of credentials ==
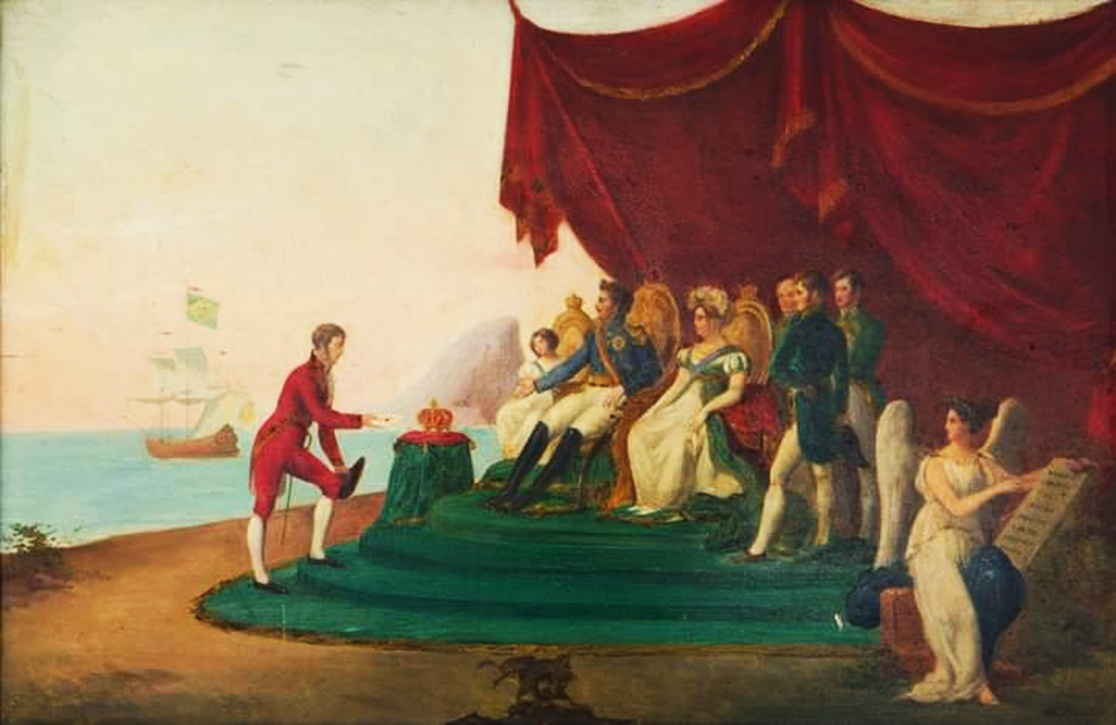
British diplomat Sir Charles Stuart presenting his credentials to Emperor Pedro I of Brazil, who is flanked by his wife Maria Leopoldina, their daughter Maria da Glória (later Queen of Portugal as Maria II), and other dignitaries (allegory), c. 1825

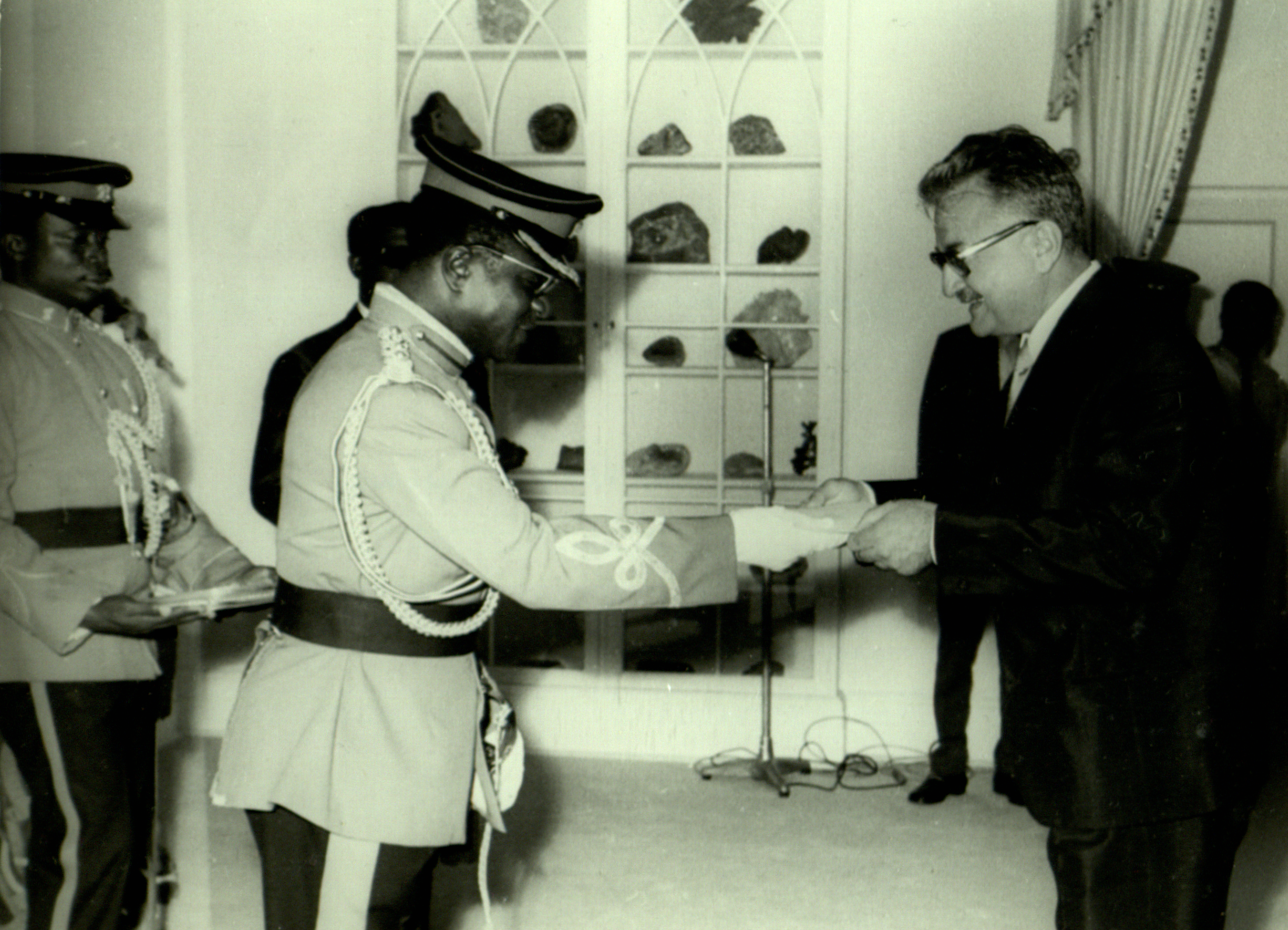
The ambassador of Yugoslavia, Zdravko Pečar, presenting his letter of credence to the military head of state of Ghana, Ignatius Kutu Acheampong, 1974

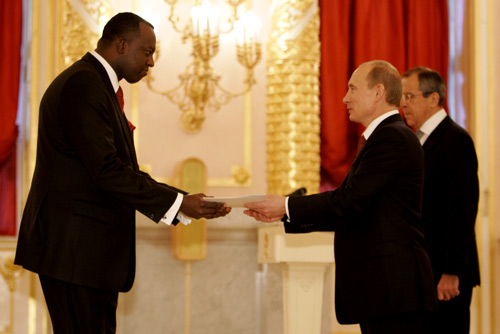
Ambassador Eugène-Richard Gasana of Rwanda presents his credentials to Russian president Vladimir Putin in the presence of Russian foreign minister Sergey Lavrov, 2007

Upon arrival at their post, the ambassador-designate meets the foreign minister to arrange for an audience with the head of state. They bring both a sealed original and an unsealed copy of his credentials. The unsealed copy is given to the foreign minister upon arrival, and the original is presented personally to the head of state in a formal ceremony. Ambassadors do not begin their duties until their credentials are accepted, and their precedence within the diplomatic corps is determined by the date on which the credentials were presented. They are, however, entitled to diplomatic immunity as soon as they enter the country.

The ambassador-designate travels to the presentation ceremony in an official vehicle provided by the receiving state, accompanied by a military escort. In parliamentary systems, the head of state or viceroy acts according to legally-binding advice from the government. The foreign minister will attend (be present with) the head of state at the actual ceremony, to symbolize the fact that the credentials are being accepted on the basis of government advice. The ambassador-designate uses both hands to present their credentials to the head of state.

Many governments hold presentation ceremonies with elements that are usually accorded to heads of state and government, such as military honors.

While credential ceremonies are among the most formal events in diplomacy, governed by strict protocols and detailed guidelines, variations in the nature of these ceremonies can still be observed among diplomats from different countries. Despite their scripted and calculated nature, these ceremonies offer state representatives a subtle yet significant space for signaling – positive or negative – establishing contact, or conveying messages.

=== Chargé d'affaires–level relations ===
When two countries maintain relations at the chargé d'affaires level, the letter of credence is instead written by the foreign minister of the sending state and addressed to the foreign minister of the receiving state. The chargé d'affaires presents their credentials to the foreign minister. The head of state is neither addressed nor presented with the credentials, symbolizing the lower level of diplomatic relations between the countries. The chargé d'affaires is not entitled to a military escort or an official car.

=== Commonwealth ===
High commissioners from Commonwealth nations do not present letters of credence. When two Commonwealth realms share the same monarch as head of state, the prime minister of the sending state writes an informal letter of introduction to the prime minister of the receiving state. When a Commonwealth nation is a republic or has its own separate monarch, high commissioners are dispatched and received with letters of commission, which are written by one head of state and presented to another head of state. Both forms of letters were standardized after India became a republic in 1950, replacing a chaotic system where some high commissioners carried letters from the prime minister, some carried letters from the minister of external relations, and others carried no letters at all.

=== Andorra ===
Andorra finds itself in a peculiar situation regarding the presentation of the French ambassador's letter of credence: since the president of France is ex officio one of the two co-princes of Andorra, the president both signs the letter of credence on behalf of France and accepts it on behalf of Andorra; the fellow co-prince is also presented the letter.

== See also ==
- Agrément
- Dual accreditation
