= Abdullah Saleh al-Ashtal =

Yemeni diplomat (born 1938)

Abdullah Saleh Al-Ashtal
- عبد الله صالح الأشطل
- Born: 1938; Yemen
- Died: 26 August 2004 (aged 65–66); New York City
- Occupation: Diplomat

Abdullah Saleh Al-Ashtal (Arabic: عبد الله صالح الأشطل; 1938 – 26 August 2004) was a Yemeni diplomat who was a permanent representative at the United Nations in New York City for nearly 30 years.

In his early career, he served as the Yemeni ambassador to Brazil.

On 29 May 1973, Al-Ashtal was appointed as the Permanent Representative of South Yemen to the United Nations. In March 1990, he was President of the United Nations Security Council. After South Yemen and North Yemen united on 22 May 1990, Al-Ashtal continued to represent the united Yemen at the UN. He was again President of the Security Council in December 1990.

He is perhaps most well known for being the only member of the United Nations Security Council to oppose authorising military action against the Iraqi invasion of Kuwait. This prompted U.S. ambassador to the UN Thomas Pickering to tell Al-Ashtal: "That will be the most expensive 'no' vote you ever cast". Following this vote, the United States suspended US$70,000,000 worth of aid to Yemen and Saudi Arabia deported thousands of Yemeni labourers from its borders.

Al-Ashtal was Yemen's ambassador to the UN until July 2002, when he resigned due to poor health. He died of lung cancer in New York City on 26 August 2004.

After his death, Yemeni government officials stated that they had repeatedly offered Al-Ashtal a senior position within the government, including that of Foreign Minister, but that he had always declined and preferred to remain at the United Nations.
