= Claude Heller =

Mexican diplomat

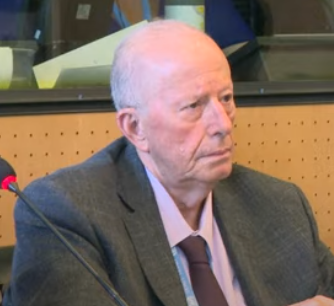
- As chairperson of the Committee Against Torture
- Born: Claude Heller Rouassant; 2 May 1949 (age 75); Mexico City, Mexico
- Education: El Colegio de México; Graduate Institute of International Studies
- Occupation: Diplomat
- Spouse: Rosario Green (divorced)

Claude Heller Rouassant (born 2 May 1949) was Mexico's Permanent Representative to the United Nations in New York City from 2007 to 2011, during which time he served as President of the Security Council on two occasions. He has also served Mexico's ambassador to France, Cuba, Austria and Switzerland. He was also ambassador to the Organisation for Economic Co-operation and Development (OECD) in Paris, and to the Organization of American States (OAS) in Washington, D.C.

As of 2024, he is the chairperson of the UN Committee Against Torture.

== Biography ==
He has a bachelor's degree in International Relations from El Colegio de México, and a master's degree in History and International Relations from the Graduate Institute of International Studies in Geneva.

He was married to Rosario Green, who was Secretary of Foreign Affairs under President Ernesto Zedillo and who also served as a senator, general secretary of the Institutional Revolutionary Party (PRI) and ambassador to Argentina.

He served as vice-chairperson of the UN Committee Against Torture from 2016 to 2019. He was elected chairperson in 2020, and reelected in 2024.
