= United Nations Security Council Resolution 14 =

United Nations Security Council resolution

UN Security Council Resolution 14
- Date: 16 December 1946
- Meeting no.: 84
- Code: S/RES/14 (Document)
- Subject: Terms of elected members and rotating presidency of the Council
- Voting summary: 9 voted for; None voted against; 2 abstained
- Result: Adopted

Security Council composition
- Permanent members: China; France; Soviet Union; United Kingdom; United States
- Non-permanent members: Australia; Brazil; Egypt; Mexico; Netherlands; Poland

United Nations Security Council Resolution 14 was adopted on 16 December 1946. Following the General Assembly's decision, the Council amended its rules of procedure to align the presidency of the Council with the calendar months. The United States' presidency was extended from 17 to 31 December 1946.

The delegation of Australia argued that since the General Assembly had altered the term of office for non-permanent members, the Council must also change the President's term to prevent a situation where the President might have to retire halfway through their term due to the expiration of their term as an elected member.

Resolution 14 passed with nine votes to none. The Soviet Union and the United States abstained.
