= Brooke D. Anderson =

American diplomat (born 1964)

Brooke Anderson
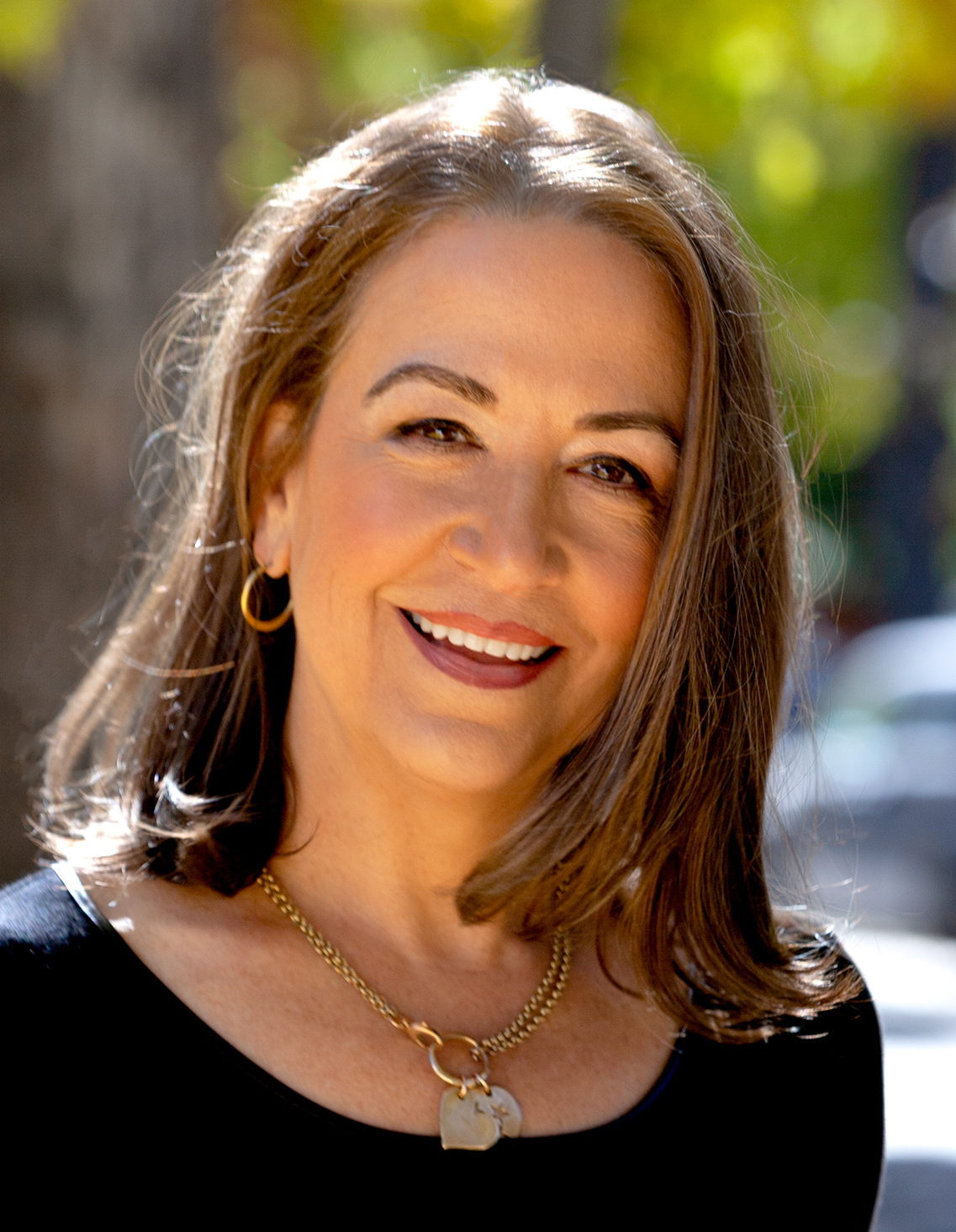
- Anderson in 2021
- Born: 1964 (age 61–62)
- Education: Sarah Lawrence College (BA)

Brooke D. Anderson (born 1964) is an American diplomat who served as a Deputy U.S. ambassador at the United Nations, as Chief of Staff and Counselor for the White House National Security Council, and as Senior Advisor to the Secretary of State and the Under Secretary for Political Affairs on the Iran Nuclear Negotiations. She has served as a trusted advisor to U.S. presidents, Cabinet Secretaries, members of Congress, presidential candidates, philanthropists and business leaders.

== Education ==
Anderson is a graduate of Sarah Lawrence College and spent a year studying abroad at Sciences Po in Paris, France. In 2014, she was awarded an honorary doctorate in letters from Montana State University.

== Career ==
In 2008 and 2009, she was the Chief National Security Spokesperson and Policy Advisor for the Obama–Biden transition team.

=== United Nations ===
In March 2009, she became Susan Rice's chief of staff at the UN, and in April 2010 she was promoted to become one of Rice's deputies and the U.S.'s alternate ambassador to the UN when Rice is absent. At the UN, she focused on issues involving UN peacekeeping and nuclear nonproliferation.

For a week in December 2010, Anderson served as the President of the United Nations Security Council while Rice was absent from the UN.

White House National Security Council

On Thursday, December 16, 2010, the White House Office of the Press Secretary announced that Anderson had been appointed by President Barack Obama to serve as the Chief of Staff and Counselor to the National Security Staff at the White House beginning on January 12, 2011. Ambassador Anderson served in this position until March 2012, dealing with challenges including nuclear weapons issues, the conflict between Sudan and South Sudan, and the political transition in Egypt. Upon her departure, President Barack Obama said of her, "I have been deeply appreciative of Brooke Anderson’s service dating back to 2007," and that Anderson had "been a close, trusted and valued advisor for many years."

On July 23, 2015, President Barack Obama appointed Ambassador Anderson as a member of the President's Intelligence Advisory Board where she served until January 2017. She also served as a member of the Department of State's International Security Advisory Board from December 2014 - January 2017.

=== Iran nuclear negotiations ===
On February 19, 2014, The New York Times reported that Anderson had joined the U.S. negotiation team as a senior advisor to the Secretary of State and the Under Secretary for Political Affairs on the Iran nuclear negotiations. In a background briefing call the following month, a senior administration official announced that Anderson would be permanently based in Brussels, Belgium, and attend both the experts and political directions meetings as well as support the European Union. On June 15, 2014, the United States Department of State announced that Anderson would travel to Vienna, Austria. as part of the U.S. delegation to the comprehensive nuclear negotiations of the P5+1 political directors with Iran. Following the meeting among P5+1 political directors in June 2014, the department announced that Anderson would travel to Geneva, Switzerland, as a U.S. delegate for consultations with Iran on September 4–5, 2014 in the context of the P5+1 nuclear negotiations.
