= Cyro de Freitas Valle =

Brazilian lawyer and diplomat

Personal details
- Born: 16 August 1896 São Paulo, Brazil
- Died: 7 November 1969 (aged 73) Rio de Janeiro, Brazil

Cyro de Freitas Valle (16 August 1896 – 7 November 1969) was a Brazilian lawyer and diplomat. He was acting Minister of Foreign Affairs in the governments of Getúlio Vargas, from January to March 1939, and Eurico Gaspar Dutra, from May to June 1949.

He was the second President of the United Nations Security Council, serving from 17 February 1946 to 16 March 1946. During World War II, Freitas Valle was a minister in Berlin and actively worked against Jewish immigration to Brazil.
