= Permanent Representative of Luxembourg to the United Nations =

Ambassador and Permanent Representative of Luxembourg to the United Nations
- Incumbent; Olivier Maes since 15 July 2021
- Style: His Excellency
- Appointer: Henri, Grand Duke of Luxembourg
- Formation: 1946
- Website: Permanent Mission

The role of the ambassador and permanent representative of Luxembourg to the United Nations is as the leader of the Luxembourger delegation to the United Nations in New York and as head of the Permanent Mission of Luxembourg to the UN. The position has the rank and status of an ambassador extraordinary and plenipotentiary and was also the representative of Luxembourg in the United Nations Security Council from 2013-2014.

The permanent representative, currently Olivier Maes, is charged with representing Luxembourg, both through its non-permanent seat on the U.N. Security Council and also during plenary meetings of the General Assembly, except in the rare situation in which a more senior officer (such as the minister for foreign affairs or the prime minister) is present.

== Officeholders ==
Incumbent	Start of term	End of term
Joseph Bech (Chairman of Delegation)	1945	1946
????	1946	1969
André Philippe	1969	1970
Paul Peters	1970	1979
Jean Rettel	1979	1983
Joseph Weyland	1983	1984
André Philippe	1985	1987
Jean Feyder	1987	1992
Jean-Louis Wolzfeld	1993	1998
Hubert Wurth	1998	2003
Jean-Marc Hoscheit	2003	2008
Sylvie Lucas	August 2008	August 2016
Christian Braun	1 September 2016	2021
Olivier Maes	15 July 2021	present

== See also ==
- Luxembourg and the United Nations
- Foreign relations of Luxembourg
