= Kodjo Menan =

Togolese diplomat

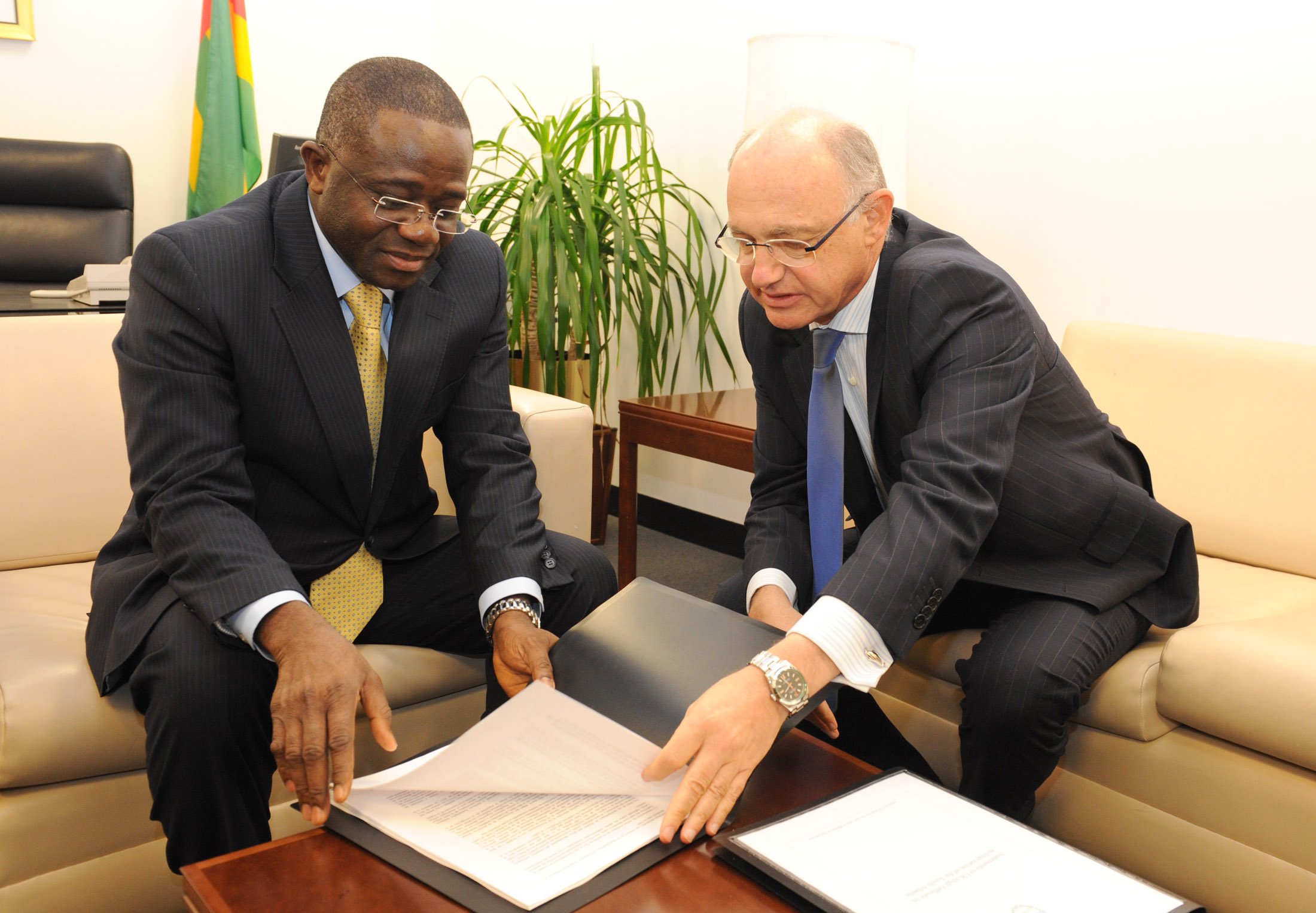
Kodjo Menan (left) with Héctor Timerman

Kodjo Menan (31 December 1959) is a Togolese diplomat. Since 2009, he has been the permanent representative of Togo to the United Nations.

Menan was born in Vogan, Togo and was educated at the National Administration School of Lomé and the University of Benin in Lomé. He became Togo's permanent representative of the UN on 25 June 2009.

During February 2012, Menan was the President of the United Nations Security Council.
