= Tekeda Alemu =

Ethiopian diplomat to the United Nations

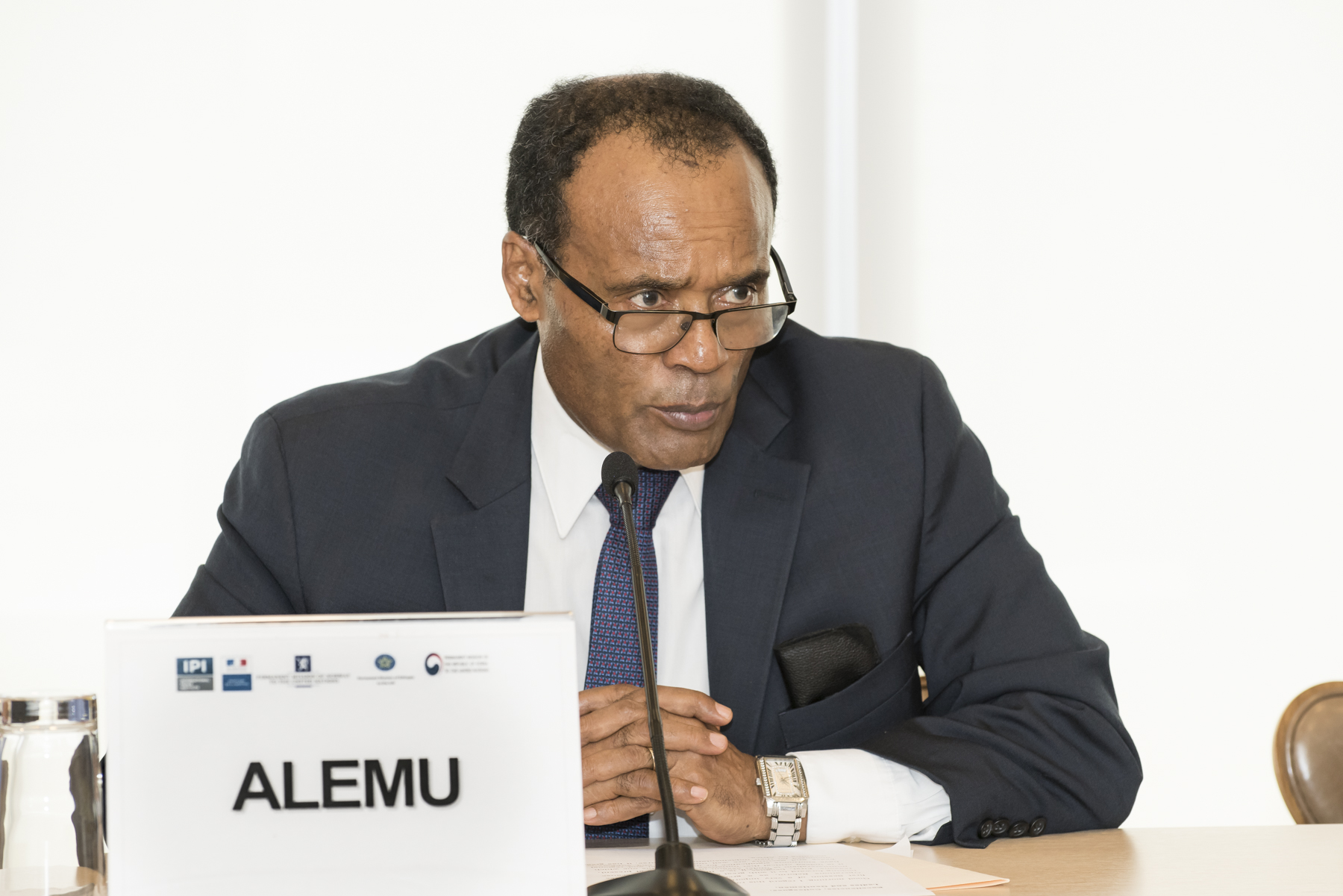
Alemu speaks at the International Peace Institute in 2017.

Tekeda Alemu (born in Addis Ababa, May 5, 1951) is an Ethiopian diplomat to the United Nations.

== Education ==
Tekeda earned a B.A. and M.A. from UCLA and a Ph.D. from Claremont Graduate School.

== Career ==
Tekeda Alemu has served as a diplomat for four decades, starting in 1983.

For the month of September 2017, Alemu served as the president of the United Nations Security Council.

== Other activities ==
- UNICEF, vice-president of the executive board (2018)
