= Luc de La Barre de Nanteuil =

French diplomat (1925–2018)

His Excellency Luc de La Barre de Nanteuil
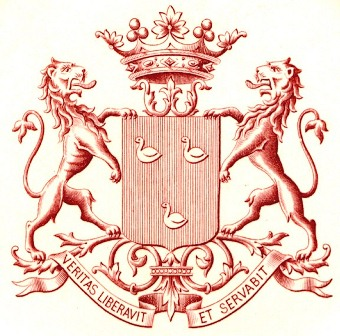

France Ambassador to the United Kingdom
- In office 1986–1990

Luc de La Barre de Nanteuil (French pronunciation: [lyk də la baʁ də nɑ̃tœj]; 21 September 1925 at Lhommaizé - 14 August 2018 in Lhommaizé) was a French career diplomat, who rose to become an Ambassador of France.

Son of Jean de La Barre de Nanteuil and Marguerite Robert de Beauchamp, he graduated from the École nationale d'administration (ENA) in Paris, before joining the French diplomatic service at the Quai d'Orsay.

La Barre de Nanteuil started his career serving in the Middle East before being posted as the Ambassador to the Netherlands in 1976 and 1977. He was quickly transferred to represent France as the Permanent Representative to the European Union (EU), serving until 1981. He was posted to New York as President of the United Nations Security Council and then back to Brussels as the Permanent Representative to the EU, before being promoted Ambassador to the United Kingdom. He served in London from 1986 until retiring from French diplomatic circles in 1990.

La Barre de Nanteuil subsequently was Chairman of Les Echos Group from 1991 until 2003.

He had two children and lived in Paris with his second wife Hedwige, née Frèrejean de Chavagneux.

== Honours ==
- Officier, Légion d'honneur,
- Commandeur, Ordre national du Mérite;

La Barre de Nanteuil was granted the title and style of Ambassadeur de France (ad vitam) in 1991, by President François Mitterrand.

== Publication ==
- Jacques-Louis David, 1985.
