= Koro Bessho =

Japanese diplomat (born 1953)

- 別所 浩郎
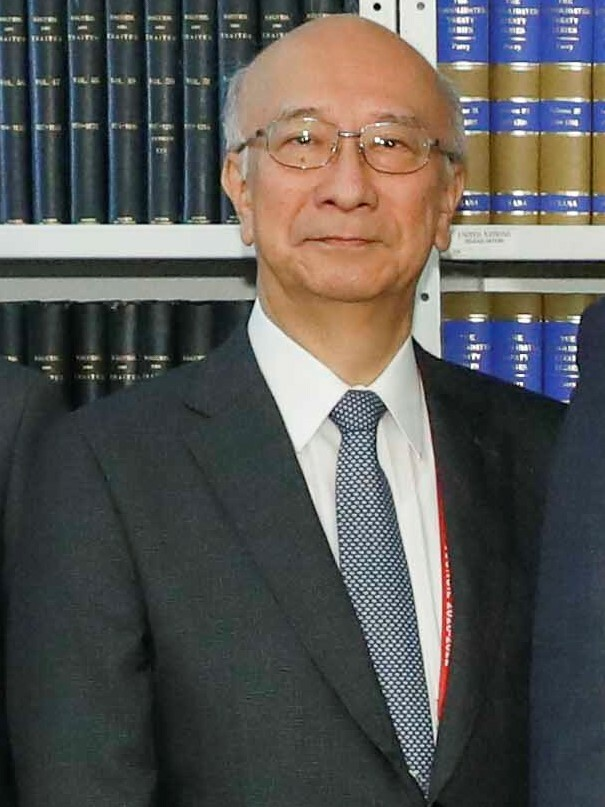
- Bessho in 2018

Grand Chamberlain to the Emperor
- Incumbent
- Assumed office 1 April 2021
- Monarch: Naruhito
- Preceded by: Nobutake Odano

Permanent Representative of Japan to the United Nations
- In office 10 June 2016 – 19 November 2019
- Preceded by: Motohide Yoshikawa
- Succeeded by: Kimihiro Ishikane

Ambassador of Japan to the Republic of Korea
- In office 2012–2016
- Preceded by: Masatoshi Mutō
- Succeeded by: Yasumasa Nagamine

Personal details
- Born: 5 February 1953 (age 73) Hyōgo Prefecture
- Education: University of Tokyo

Koro Bessho (別所 浩郎, Bessho Kōrō; born 5 February 1953) is a Japanese diplomat who has served as Grand Chamberlain to the Emperor since 2021. He previously served as Permanent Representative to the United Nations from 2016 to 2019, and as President of the United Nations Security Council in July 2016 and December 2017.

== Career ==
Bessho was born in Hyōgo Prefecture and lived in New Zealand as an elementary and junior high school student. He graduated from Nada High School in Kobe and obtained an LL.B. from the University of Tokyo in 1975, thereafter joining the Ministry of Foreign Affairs. He worked in the Japanese Embassy in Washington D.C. from 1990 to 1993, and in 1995 was appointed head of the Northeast Asia Division of the Foreign Ministry. He served as Executive Secretary to Prime Minister Junichiro Koizumi from April 2001, and as Ambassador to the Republic of Korea from 2012 to 2016.

As ambassador to South Korea, he made efforts to resolve the ongoing controversy between the two countries surrounding the comfort women issue. He left Korea to serve as the Permanent Representative to the United Nations for Japan in June 2016. He received the ROK's highest diplomatic honor for his work to improve Japan-Korea relations that same year. Sankei Shimbun Seoul correspondent Katsuhiro Kuroda described Bessho as one of the "best five" of the fourteen Japanese ambassadors to South Korea since 1977, praising his English ability and his good relationship with the press.

As Permanent Representative Bessho served as rotating president of the UN Security Council in July 2016, and was responsible for tallying the ballots in the United Nations Secretary-General selection held that month. He replaced as permanent representative and retired from the foreign service in 2019.

Bessho was appointed Grand Chamberlain to the Emperor in April 2021.

Diplomatic posts
Preceded by Masatoshi Muto	Japanese Ambassador to South Korea; 2012–2016	Succeeded by Yasumasa Nagamine
Preceded by Motohide Yoshikawa	Permanent Representative to the United Nations; 2016–2019	Succeeded by Kimihiro Ishikane
Court offices
Preceded by Masato Kaji	Vice Grand Chamberlain; 2020–2021	Succeeded by Norihiro Sakane
Preceded by Nobutake Odano	Grand Chamberlain; 2021–present	Incumbent
