= Dragoslav Pejić =

Yugoslav diplomat (1929– 2016)

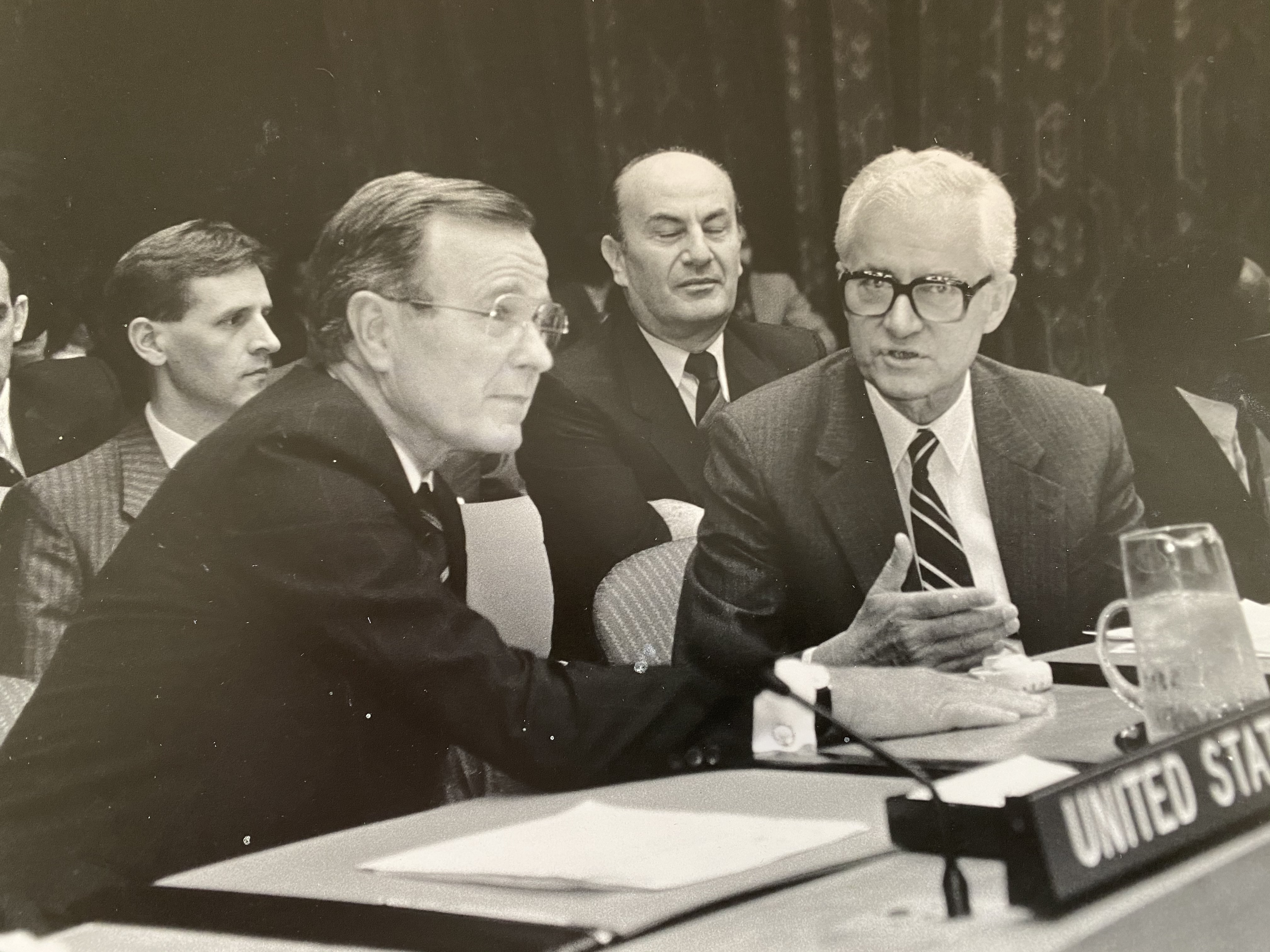
- Pejić (right) talking to George H.W. Bush (left), Vice-President of the United states, at a Security Council Meeting
- Born: 1929
- Died: September 1, 2016 (aged 86–87); Belgrade, Serbia
- Occupation: Diplomat
- Known for: President of UN Security Council

Dragoslav Pejić (1929 – 1 September 2016) served as a Yugoslav diplomat. He served as the Yugoslav ambassador to the United Nations between 1985 and 1989. Pejic served as the President of the United Nations Security Council on two occasions. The first time he chaired the security council was in March 1988. He was president again in July 1989.

== See also ==
- Yugoslavia and the United Nations
