= Elbio Rosselli =

Uruguayan politician

Elbio Rosselli served as the President of the United Nations Security Council for the month of January 2016. He is from Uruguay.
