= Eugène-Richard Gasana =

Rwandan diplomat

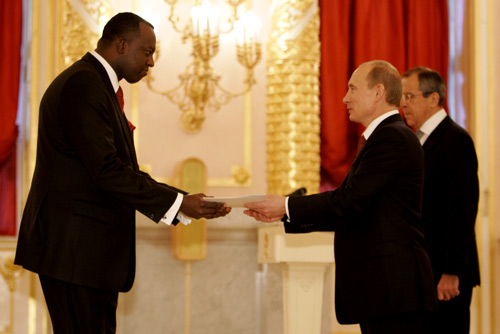
Eugène-Richard Gasana presents his Letter of Credence to then-President of Russia Vladimir Putin on 11 December 2007.

Eugène-Richard Gasana is a Rwandan diplomat and former Permanent Representative of Rwanda to the United Nations in New York City. Previously, Gasana has been the Ambassador Extraordinary and Plenipotentiary of the Republic of Rwanda to the Federal Republic of Germany, with concurrent accreditation to Austria, Bulgaria, Russia, Hungary, Poland, the Czech Republic, and Romania. Gasana was the President of the United Nations Security Council in April 2013 and July 2014.
