= Amr Abdellatif Aboulatta =

Egyptian diplomat

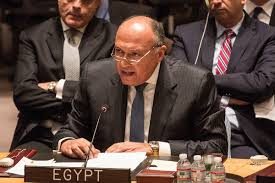
Amr Abdellatif Aboulatta in the United Nations Security Council

Amr Abdellatif Aboulatta has been Egypt's Ambassador and Permanent Representative to the United Nations since 2014 and is the Chair of the United Nations Security Council Counter-Terrorism Committee. From 2008 to 2012, Abdellatif was Egypt's Ambassador to Jordan. He also served as a permanent representative to the Arab League.

Abdellatif has been in the month of August, 2017, the President of the United Nations Security Council.
