= Kim Sook (diplomat) =

South Korean diplomat

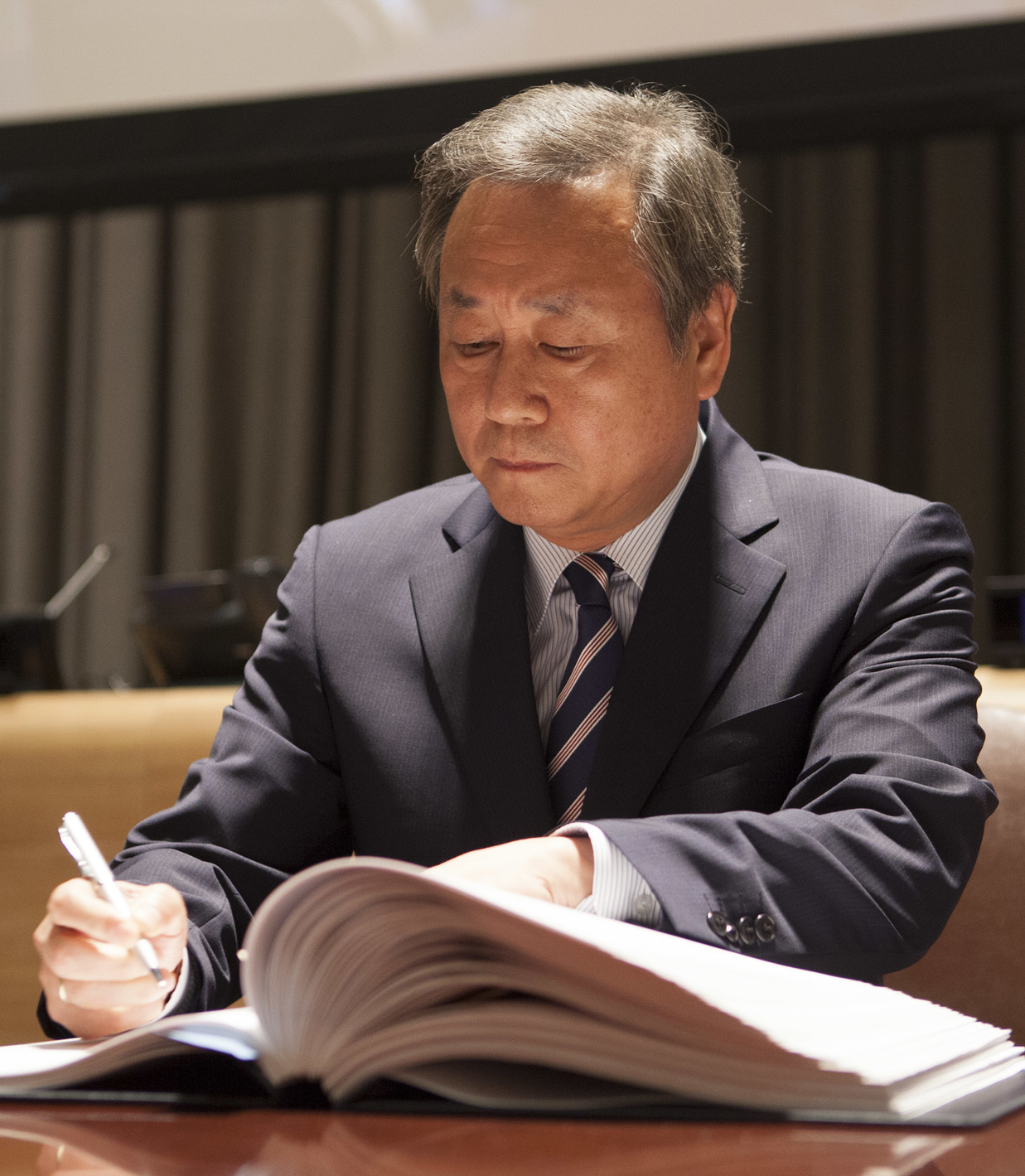
Portrait of Kim Sook in 2013

Kim Sook (born 19 September 1952) is a South Korean diplomat. He has been the Permanent Representative of the Republic of Korea to the United Nations in New York since 2011.

Kim was educated at Seoul National University and joined the South Korean diplomatic service in 1978. He has held a variety of diplomatic positions in the United States, Canada, and India. In May 2011, he became South Korea's Permanent Representative to the United Nations in New York.

Kim was the President of the United Nations Security Council in February 2013.
