= Claude de Kemoularia =

French diplomat

Claude de Kemoularia (March 30, 1922 – November 4, 2016) was a French citizen of Georgian descent whose career has been in the fields of banking and diplomacy. He served as Dag Hammarskjöld's personal assistant from 1957 to 1961. In the mid-1960s, he was a special advisor to Prince Rainier of Monaco. From the late 1960s to 1982, he worked for Paribas. He returned to government with the Socialist administration of François Mitterrand in 1982. He served as France's permanent representative and ambassador to the United Nations in the 1980s. He was also a guest on William F. Buckley's show "Firing Line", along with Benjamin Netanyahu on the topic of terrorism and what differences it has with revolutionary struggle.

== Biography ==
Claude de Kémoularia was born on March 30, 1922, in Paris. His father, Joseph de Kémoularia, fled to France following the invasion of Georgia by the Red Army forces in 1921. His father is one of the founders of the Georgian Orthodox Parish Eparchy of Saint Nino.

Il obtient le Baccalauréat au rattrapage, et s'inscrit à Sciences Po, dans la section Finances privées.Recruited as a member of a ministerial cabinet, he did not attend classes and only passed twelve of the thirteen final oral exams. Despite Roger Seydoux insistence, public finance professor Gabriel Cheneaux de Leiritz refused to withdraw his failing grade. Claude de Kémoularia therefore did not obtain his degree from the school.

Claude de Kémoularia married Chantal de Kémoularia, whom he met at the École libre des sciences politiques, and one of the first two women to graduate from the school.

== Bibliography ==
- Hume, Cameron (1994). The United Nations, Iran, and Iraq. Bloomington: Indiana University Press.
- Sciolino, Elaine (1985). "US Vetoes Resolution on Israel in UN." The New York Times. March 13.
