= Raimonda Murmokaitė =

Lithuanian diplomat

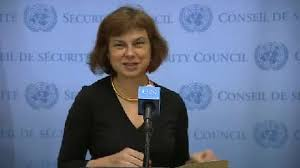
Image of Raimonda Murmokaitė

Raimonda Murmokaitė (born 17 July 1959) is a Lithuanian diplomat, serving as Permanent Representative of Lithuania to the United Nations since 25 October 2012, when she presented her credentials to UN Secretary-General Ban Ki-moon. She served as President of the United Nations Security Council for February 2014 and May 2015 and leave her post as Permanent Representative in New York in 2017.
