= Yukio Takasu =

Japanese diplomat

- 高須幸雄
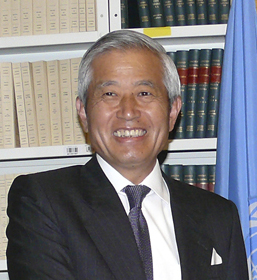
- Yukio Takasu in 2009.

Personal details
- Born: August 29, 1946 (age 78); Yokohama, Kanagawa Prefecture

Yukio Takasu (高須幸雄, Takasu Yukio) (born August 29, 1946) is a Japanese diplomat and the former United Nations Under-Secretary-General for Management. Previously, he was the Special Adviser on Human Security to the United Nations Secretary-General. Takasu also served as Advisor to the Japanese Foreign Minister and as Professor at the University of Tokyo. Since 2011, Takasu has taught at Ritsumeikan University in Kyoto. He was Permanent Representative and Ambassador Extraordinary and Plenipotentiary at the Permanent Mission of Japan to the United Nations in New York. Takasu has also twice served as President of the United Nations Security Council, once in February 2009 and again in April 2010.

== Education ==
Takasu was educated at the University of Tokyo (Faculty of Law) and Oxford University (Merton College).

== Career ==
From December 2001 to September 2005, Takasu served as Ambassador Extraordinary and Plenipotentiary at the Permanent Mission of Japan to International Organizations in Vienna. (including the International Atomic Energy Agency (IAEA), the Preparatory Commission for the Comprehensive Nuclear-Test-Ban Treaty (CTBTO) and the United Nations Industrial Development Organization (UNIDO)). During this period, he held the position of President of the IAEA General Conference and he chaired the Preparatory Commission for the CTBTO. In April 2000, Ambassador Takasu was posted in Tokyo and assumed the post of Director-General for the Multilateral Cooperation Department. In this capacity, Ambassador Takasu assisted in hosting the G8 Okinawa Summit and he was instrumental in promoting Japan’s initiative for human security and launching the Commission for Human Security. Earlier at the Foreign Ministry in Tokyo, he was responsible for Japan’s policy toward Western Europe (Director of Western Europe Division, 1989–92). During the Gulf crisis, Takasu was in charge of formulating Japan’s contribution to the international efforts, including drafting UN Peacekeeping Cooperation Law. He joined Japan’s diplomatic service in 1969, subsequently serving in various overseas posts (London, Kuala Lumpur, New York, Jakarta, Vienna, and Washington, DC).

== See also ==
- List of current permanent representatives to the United Nations
