= Jean-Bernard Mérimée =

French diplomat

- Born: 6 December 1936; Toulouse, France
- Died: 2 May 2023 (aged 86); Paris, France
- Occupation: Diplomat

Jean-Bernard Mérimée (4 December 1936 – 2 May 2023) was a French diplomat. In 2005 he admitted to accepting bribes in connection to the Oil-for-Food Program.

== Career ==
Jean-Bernard Mérimée was a graduate of the Institute of Political Studies of Paris and the National School of Administration. He was based in London (1966-1972), Abidjan (1975-1978) and held various positions at headquarters before being appointed Head of Mission of cooperation in Ivory Coast (1975-1978). Mérimée served as ambassador to Australia (1982-1985), India (1985-1987) and Morocco (1987-1991).

In 1986, Mérimée was received into the Legion of Honour as a Knight.

He was a signatory of the 1991 Paris Peace Agreements.

Mérimée was Permanent Representative of France to the United Nations Security Council from 1991 to 1995, including at the time that United Nations Security Council Resolution 986 was passed to permit the import of petroleum and petroleum products originating in Iraq, as a temporary measure to provide for humanitarian needs of the Iraqi people, establishing the Oil-for-Food Program.

From 1995 to 1998 Mérimée was French ambassador to Italy.

Mérimée was retired from the French Foreign Ministry in 1999 and began working for a Moroccan Banking enterprise, BMCE, owned by Othman Benjelloun. In 2002 he accepted bribes amounting to over USD100,000 whilst a special adviser to Kofi Annan.

Diplomatic posts
Preceded by Pierre Carraud	French Ambassador to Australia; 1982–1985	Succeeded by Bernard Follin
Preceded by	French Ambassador to India; 1985–1987	Succeeded by
Preceded by	French Ambassador to Morocco; 1987–1991	Succeeded by
Preceded by Pierre-Louis Blanc	Permanent Representative of France to the United Nations; 1991–1995	Succeeded by Alain Dejammet
Preceded by	French Ambassador to Italy; 1995–1998	Succeeded by
