= Alain Dejammet =

French diplomat

Permanent Representative of France to the United Nations
- In office 1995–1999
- President: Jacques Chirac
- Secretary-General: Boutros Boutros-Ghali followed by Kofi Annan
- Preceded by: Jean-Bernard Mérimée
- Succeeded by: Jean-David Levitte

Personal details
- Profession: diplomat

Alain Dejammet is a former Permanent Representative of France to the United Nations. Before that he was ambassador of France to Egypt.

== Books ==
- Supplément au voyage en Onusie, Fayard, 2003.
