= Joseph Legwaila =

Joseph Manson John Legwaila

Botswana Diplomat
- In office 12 November 2014 – 5 November 2019

Personal details
- Born: 2 February 1937 (age 89) Botswana
- Party: BDP

Joseph Manson John Legwaila (born 2 February 1937) is a diplomat and politician from Botswana. Legwaila studied politics, history and international relations at the University of Alberta in Canada and taught there for a time. He was Vice-President of the United Nations General Assembly for three sessions in total (1981, 1987 and 1991). He has represented Botswana in the Security Council and presided for one month during 1995, as President. He has further held a number of diplomatic functions for Botswana in the Americas. Amongst these was as ambassador to Cuba (1981-2001) and as Consul General in Jamaica (1982-2001). He worked on several missions of the UN in Africa. Legewaila has led the United Nations Mission in Ethiopia and Eritrea (UNMEE) since September 29, 2000 as a particular agent of the Secretary-General in Eritrea and Ethiopia. Legwaila is married and has three children.
