= Noel Dorr =

Irish diplomat

Noel Dorr (born 1 November 1933, in Limerick, Ireland) is a former Irish diplomat. He has been described as "the most universally admired Irish diplomat of his generation".

== Biography ==
Dorr attended St. Nathy's College in Ballaghaderreen and studied at the National University of Ireland and Georgetown University in Washington, DC. He received a Bachelor of Commerce (B.Comm) and a Master of Arts (MA).

In 1960, he joined the diplomatic service of the Department of Foreign Affairs.

He was from 1980 to 1983, the Permanent Representative of Ireland at the United Nations in New York City. During this time, from 1981 to 1982, he was Irish Representative in the Security Council of the United Nations and from April to May 1981 acted as President of the Security Council.

From 1983 to 1987, Dorr was the Irish Ambassador to the United Kingdom. He then served as Secretary General of Ireland's Foreign Ministry from 1987 until his retirement in 1995.

He was persuaded out of retirement on two occasions, becoming the Irish foreign minister's personal representative for both the intergovernmental conferences which negotiated the Amsterdam Treaty (1997) and the Nice Treaty (2000).

In 2001, he was awarded an honorary doctorate of Laws (LLD) by his alma mater, NUI Galway.

He was elected a member of the Royal Irish Academy in 2008.

In January, 2014 he was invited before the Joint Oireachtas Committee on Foreign Affairs and Trade to participate in the discussion on its Review of Foreign Affairs Policy and External Relations.

== Publications ==
- Book Chapter, The Years Before Good Friday: Some Personal Memories, in Brokering the Good Friday Agreement: The Untold Story, Ed. Mary Daly, Royal Irish Academy, (2019)
- Sunningdale: the Search for Peace in Northern Ireland,(2017).
- A Small State at the Top Table,(2011)
- Ireland and the United Nations: Memories of the Early Years, (2010)
