= João Carlos Muniz =

Brazilian diplomat and lawyer (1893–1960)

João Carlos Muniz (21 March 1893 – 19 June 1960) was a Brazilian lawyer and diplomat. He served as the head of Brazil's delegation to the United Nations and as Brazilian Ambassador to the United States. He was a delegate to the League of Nations, President of the UN Security Council, and a founder of the International Atomic Energy Agency.

== Life and career ==
Muniz was born in 1893 in Cuiabá, Brazil. He studied law at the University of Rio de Janeiro.

In 1918, he began his diplomatic career as a vice consul posted to New York City. From 1937 to 1940, he served as Foreign Affairs Minister Oswaldo Aranha’s chief of cabinet. Muniz additionally served as a diplomat in Poland, Switzerland, and the United Kingdom, an envoy to Cuba, and ambassador to Ecuador.

In 1947, Muniz became the head of Brazil's delegation to the United Nations. In 1953, he was named Brazil's Ambassador to the United States.

In 1956, Muniz was appointed as President of the Conference of the Statute of the International Atomic Energy Agency, which he led until the ratification of the agency's founding in 1957.

He died in 1960 in Teresópolis.
