= Jamal Alrowaiei =

Bahraini diplomat

Jamal Fares Alrowaiei (born 3 August 1971 in Riffa, Bahrain) is a Bahraini diplomat serving as permanent representative of Bahrain to the United Nations since 2011.

== Education ==
Alrowaiei holds a bachelor’s degree in political science from University of Bahrain.

== Career ==
He joined the foreign service of Bahrain in 1995 as a political analyst in the Research and Studies Department of the Ministry of Foreign Affairs. He was political officer in Bahrain Embassy in Washington, D.C. from 2001 to 2005 when he became an adviser in the office of Minister for Foreign Affairs serving there until 2008. He was appointed deputy permanent representative of Bahrain to the United Nations in 2008 and remained in this position until 14 September 2011 when he was appointed permanent representative of Bahrain to United Nations.
