= Denis Dangue Réwaka =

Gabonese diplomat

Denis Dangué Réwaka is a Gabonese diplomat who was the Permanent Representative of Gabon to the United Nations from 1988 to 2008.

Dangué Réwaka became Second Counsellor at Gabon's Embassy to Belgium in January 1970. He was subsequently Gabon's Ambassador to the Philippines for a time before becoming its Permanent Representative to the UN on 11 October 1988. He served as President of the United Nations Security Council in February 1998 and May 1999, and he also served for a time as Chairman of the Credentials Committee.

After nearly 20 years at the UN, Dangué Réwaka was replaced by Emmanuel Issoze-Ngondet, who presented his credentials as Permanent Representative on 25 August 2008.
