= Roger Seydoux =

French diplomat (1908–1985)

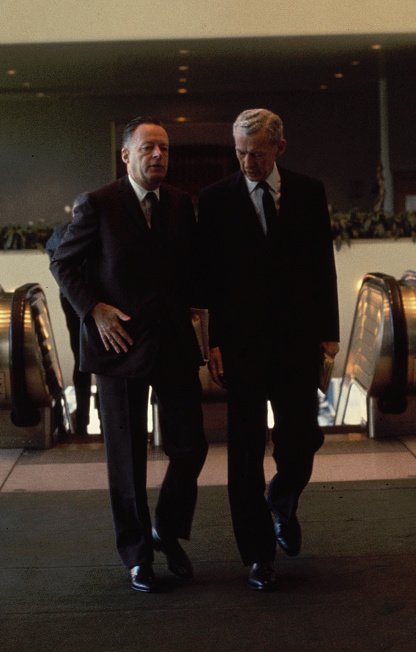
- Seydoux (left) in 1967

Personal details
- Born: 28 March 1908; Paris
- Died: 3 July 1985; Paris

Roger Seydoux (28 March 1908 in Paris – 3 July 1985 in Paris) was a French academic and diplomat.

== Main diplomatic assignments ==
- Last Resident-general in Tunisia
- First ambassador to Tunisia (1956)
- Ambassador to Morocco (1960–1962)
- Permanent representative to the United Nations (1962–1967)
- Permanent representative to NATO (1967–1968)
- Ambassador to the Soviet Union (1968–1972)
