= Arlette Conzemius =

Diplomat from Luxembourg

Arlette Conzemius (born 11 December 1956) is an ambassador from Luxembourg who is the permanent representative to NATO and Belgium. She has also served as ambassador to the United States from 1998 until 2005. She served concurrently as the non-resident ambassador to Canada, non-resident ambassador to Mexico, and permanent observer to the Organization of American States.

== Education ==
- Degree in Political Science from the Graduate Institute of International Studies, Geneva.
- Master's Degree from the Fletcher School of Law and Diplomacy at Tufts University, Massachusetts.

Diplomatic posts
Preceded by Alphonse Berns	Ambassador to the United States; 1998 – 2005	Succeeded by Joseph Weyland
