= Paul de Favereau =

Belgian politician (1856–1922)

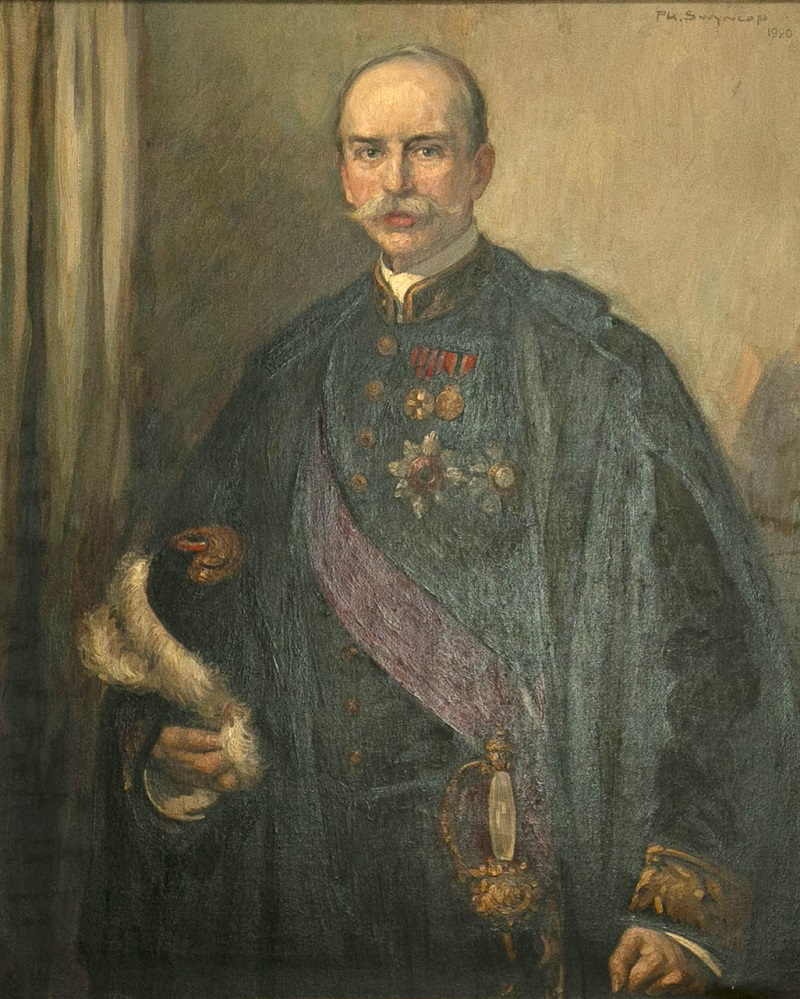
Paul de Favereau

Paul-Louis-Marie-Célestin, baron de Favereau (15 January 1856 – 26 September 1922) was a Belgian politician and member of the Catholic Party.

== Life ==
Born in Liège, he became a doctor of law before serving as member of the Belgian Parliament for the arrondissement of Marche-en-Famenne (1884–1900). On 16 September 1884 he married Marie-Charlotte Frésart (1864–1947), with whom he had Edith-Paul-Adeline-Marie-Joseph-Ernestine-Elisabeth de Favereau, later wife of Charles-Albert d'Aspremont Lynden and mother of Harold Charles d'Aspremont Lynden.

De Favereau also became Foreign Minister (1896–1907) and senator for the Province of Luxembourg (1900–1922). He was made a minister of state in 1907. For his last eleven years in the senate he also served as its president. He died at the château de Jenneret.

== Honours ==
- Grand cordon of the Order of Leopold
- Civic Cross, 1st Class
- Commemorative Medal of the Reign of King Leopold II
- Grand Cross of the Order of
  - Saints Maurice and Lazarus (Italy)
  - the Oak Crown (Luxembourg)
  - the Saviour (Greece)
  - the Double Dragon (China)
  - the Polar Star (Sweden)
  - the White Eagle (Poland)
  - the Rising Sun (Japan)
  - the Villa Vicosa (Portugal)
  - the White Elephant (Siam)
  - the Lion and the Sun (Persia)
  - the Légion d’honneur (France)
  - Osmanieh (Turkey)
  - Pius IX (Papal States)

Preceded by Jacques-Joseph Brassine	Foreign Minister of Belgium; 1896–1907	Succeeded by Julien Davignon
Preceded by Alfred, vicomte Simonis	President of the Senate of Belgium; 1911–1922	Succeeded by Arnold, comte t'Kint de Roodenbeke
