= Joseph Weyland =

Luxembourgian diplomat (born 1943)

Joseph Weyland (born 24 April 1943) is a Luxembourgish diplomat and was Luxembourg's Ambassador to the United States from 2 March 2005 to 2008. In addition, he was concurrently accredited to Canada, Mexico, and the Organization of American States (OAS). He had previously been Permanent Representative to the United Nations in New York (1983 – 84), Permanent Representative to the European Union (1984 – 91), Ambassador to the United Kingdom (1993 – 2002), and Permanent Representative to NATO (2003 – 05).

== Honours ==
He is a recipient of numerous decorations, including:

- Luxembourg:
  - Order of Merit (Grand Officer)
  - Order of the Oak Crown (Commander)
- France: Légion d'honneur (Commander)

== Footnotes ==
Diplomatic posts
Preceded by Jean Rettel	Permanent Representative of Luxembourg to the United Nations; 1983 – 1984	Succeeded by André Philippe
Preceded by Jean-Jacques Kasel	Permanent Representative at NATO; 2003 – 2005	Succeeded by Alphonse Berns
Preceded by Arlette Conzemius	Ambassador to the United States; 2005 – 2008	Succeeded by Jean-Paul Senninger
