= List of permanent representatives of Luxembourg to NATO =

The Permanent Representative of Luxembourg to NATO is the Grand Duchy of Luxembourg's foremost diplomatic representative at NATO, and head of Luxembourg's diplomatic mission to the organisation.

== List of heads of mission ==
=== Permanent Representatives to NATO ===
- Albert Wehrer (1952–1953)
- Nicolas Hommel (1953–1959)
- Paul Reuter (1959–1967)
- Lambert Schaus (1967–1973)
- Marcel Fischbach (1973–1977)
- Pierre Wurth (1977–1984)
- Jean Wagner (1984–1986)
- Guy de Muyser (1986–1991)
- Thierry Stoll (1991–1993)
- Paul Schuller (1993–1998)
- Jean-Jacques Kasel (1998–2003)
- Joseph Weyland (2003–2005)
- Alphonse Berns (2005–2011)
- Jean-Jacques Welfring (2011–2016)
- Arlette Conzemius (September 2016–date)
