= Order of Merit of the Grand Duchy of Luxembourg =

Order of merit of Luxembourg

Order of Merit of the Grand Duchy of Luxembourg Ordre de Mérite du Grand-Duché de Luxembourg
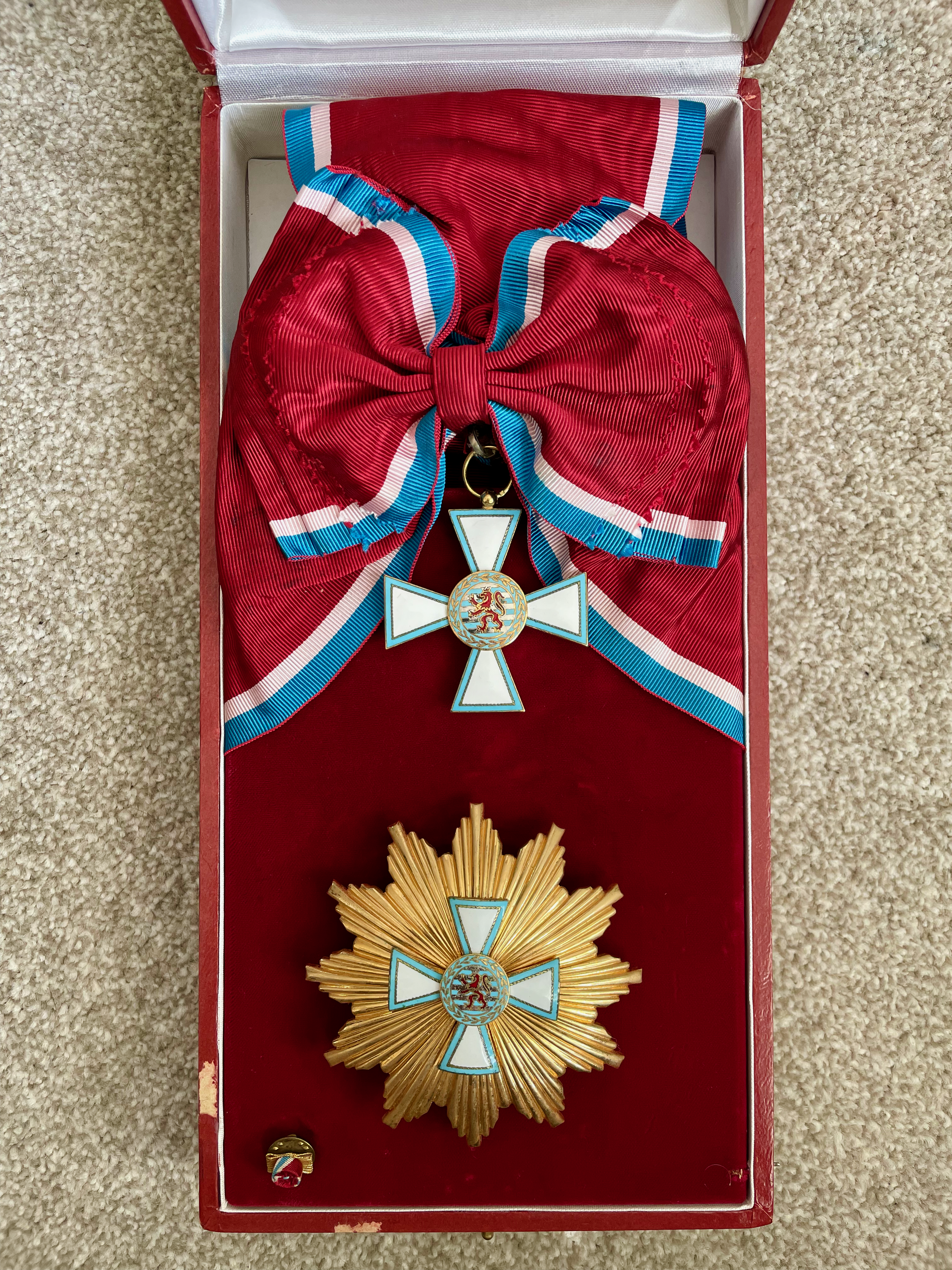
- Grand Cross insignia set

Awarded by Grand Duchy of Luxembourg
- Type: order of merit with five grades
- Eligibility: Eligible for deputies, state councillors, civil servants, elected representatives and personnel of municipal administrations, key players of the economic, social, cultural or sport sectors as well for volunteers. Order can also be awarded to foreigners.
- Status: Currently constituted
- Grand Master: Guillaume V
- Chancellor: Luc Frieden
- Grades: Grand Cross, Grand Officer, Commander, Officer, Knight

Precedence
- Next (higher): Order of the Oak Crown
- Next (lower): Military Medal
- Ribbon bar of the order

The Order of Merit of the Grand Duchy of Luxembourg (French: Ordre de Mérite du Grand-Duché de Luxembourg) is an order of merit of Luxembourg, instituted on 23 January 1961 by Grand Duchess Charlotte. Grand Master of the order is the Grand Duke of Luxembourg. Besides the five classes, a gilt medal can also be bestowed.

== Grades ==
The order is composed of 5 grades:

- Grand Cross
- Grand Officer
- Commander
- Officer
- Knight

A silver-gilt medal is annexed to the order. The silver-gilt medal is awarded to centenarians and can also be awarded for acts of rescue.

Ribbon bars
Grand Cross	Grand Officer	Commander	Officer	Knight

== Members ==
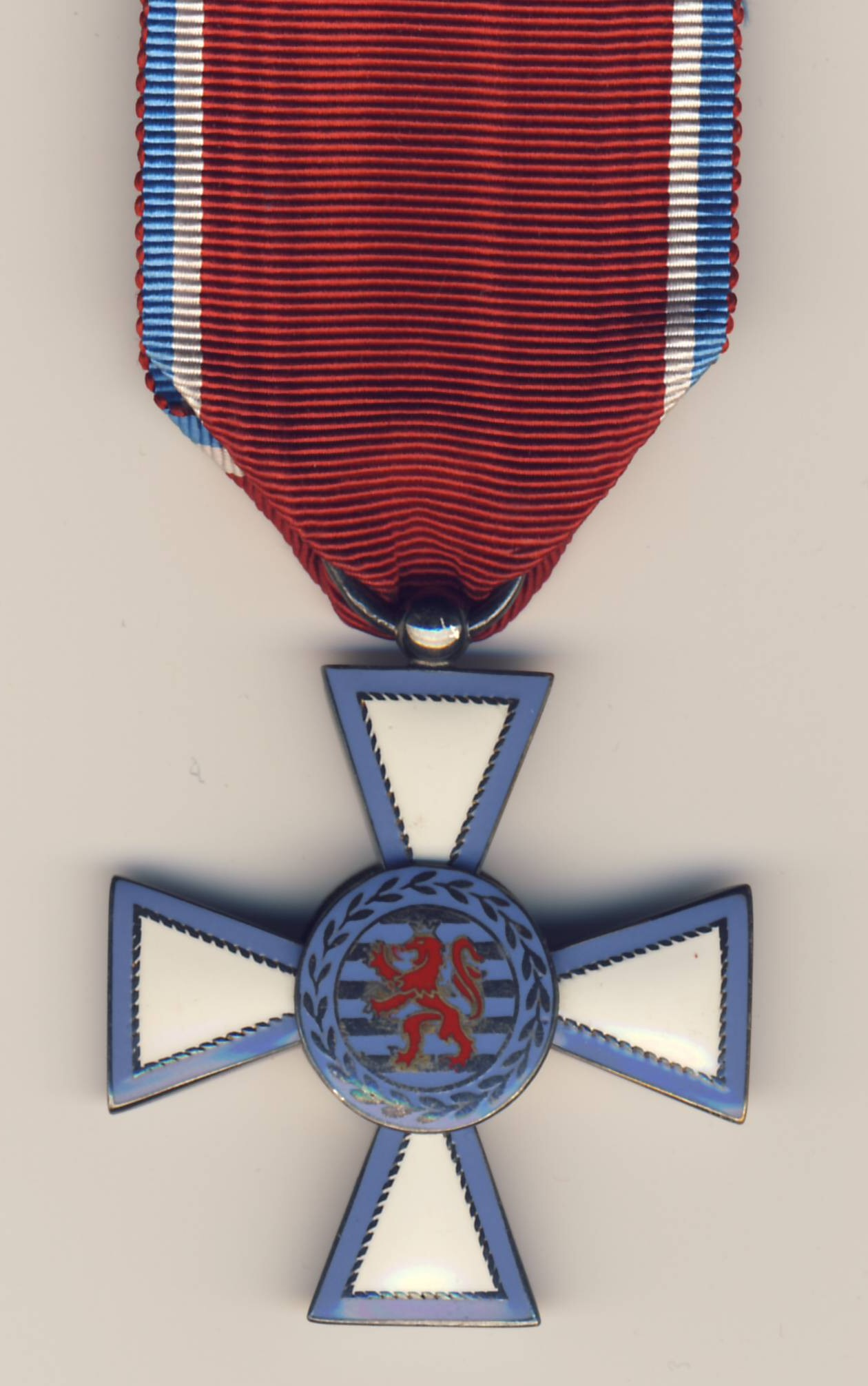
Knights class of the Order.

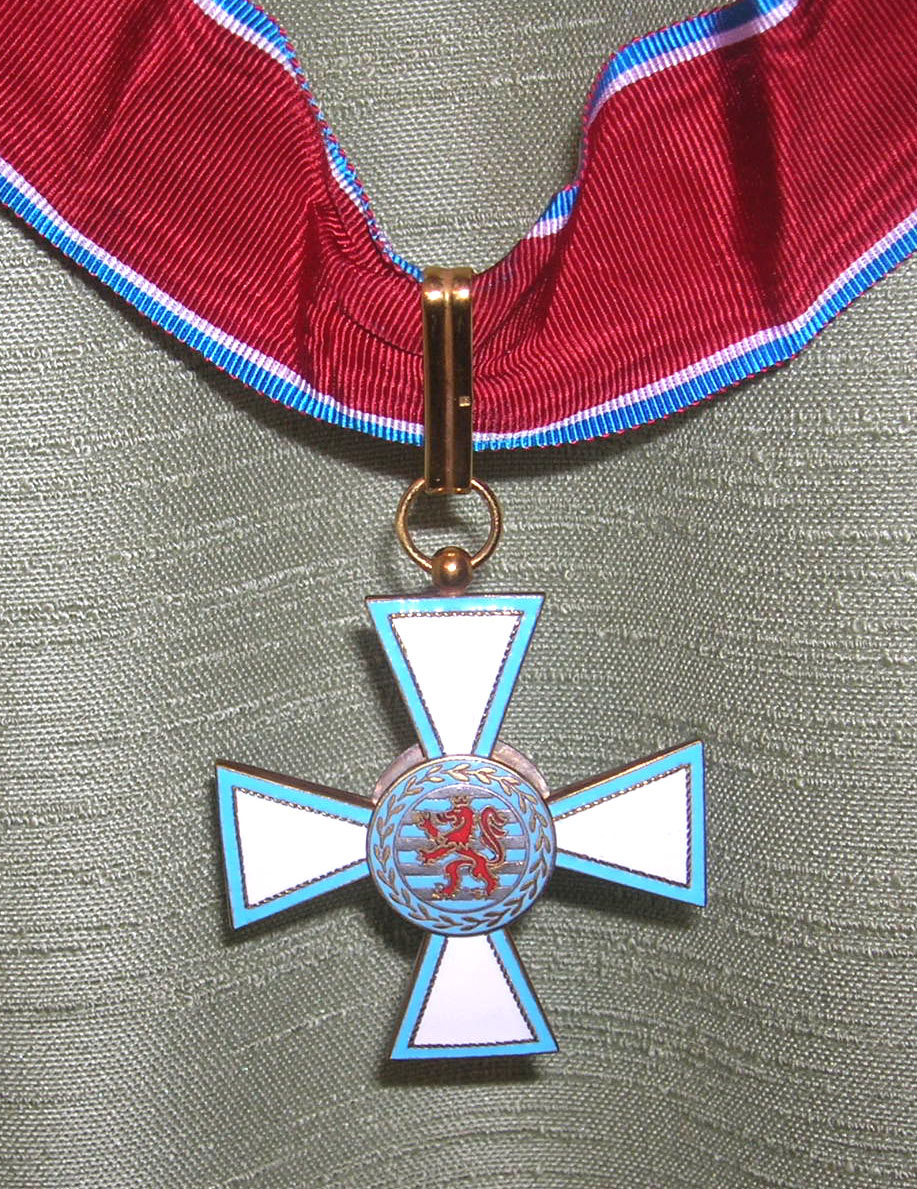
Commander class of the Order.

Members of the Order of Merit of Luxembourg include the following:

Grand Cross:

- Antonios Chatzidakis, former General Manager of the NATO Maintenance and Supply Agency NAMSA
- Gabriele Albertini, Italian politician
- Boutros Boutros-Ghali, former secretary-general of the United Nations
- Jos Chabert, vice-president of the parliament of Brussels
- Didier Reynders
- Konstantin Zhigalov, Deputy Minister of Foreign Affairs of Kazakhstan
- Astrid Lulling, Luxembourg politician, retired member of the European Parliament for Luxembourg
- John L Murray, Chief Justice of Ireland
- Ilze Indriksone, Latvian politician
- Mark Rutte, former Prime Minister of the Kingdom of the Netherlands, Secretary General of NATO, since 7 June 2024

Grand Officer:

- Wesley Clark, former Supreme Allied Commander
- Tommy Koh, Singaporean Ambassador-at-Large, diplomatist and law professor
- Nikolaos van Dam, Dutch ambassador to Indonesia
- Jean-Marie Leblanc, former director of the Tour de France
- Mikis Theodorakis, music composer
- Joseph Weyland, permanent representative of Luxembourg to NATO
- Gabriele Albertini, member of the European Parliament
- James G. Stavridis, former commander of USEUCOM and Supreme Allied Commander Europe
- José Lello, member of Portuguese Parliament, former President of NATO PA

Commander:

- Nana Mouskouri, Greek and international singer
- Vicky Leandros, Greek and international singer
- Thomas Schaidhammer, United States Army Colonel, Berlin Attache
- Svend-Aage Nielsen, Danish businessman
- Carl Christian Nielsen, Danish businessman
- Erik Ader, Dutch ambassador to Norway
- Michel Carpentier, director general of the European Commission
- Robert Engels, Dutch ambassador to Finland
- Barend ter Haar, Dutch diplomat
- Pascal Lamy, European Commissioner
- Gilbert Renault, French resistance hero
- Simon Wiesenthal, Nazi-hunter
- Gerald Newton, Professor of German at the University of Sheffield
- Michel Monnier, French diplomat
- Wicher Wildeboer, Netherlands ambassador to Cuba and Jamaica
- Robert DeFalco, American business executive
- Alexei Mordashov, Russian businessman

Officer

- Hanna Pri-zan, Israeli chairman of Peilim portfolio management
- Alphonse Berns, Luxembourgish ambassador
- Jacques Devillers, ArcelorMittal – LCE – Head of reporting
- Gerard Druesne, Director-General of the European Institute of Public Affairs
- Nicolas Majerus, Luxembourgish politician for the CSV party and heart specialist

Knight

- Josy Linkels, painter
- Fernand Roda, painter
- Jean-Claude Schlim
- Marianne Majerus, Anglo-Luxembourgish photographer
- Marie-Joseé Stark
- Martyn William Edwards
- Thierry Terrens

== Gallery ==
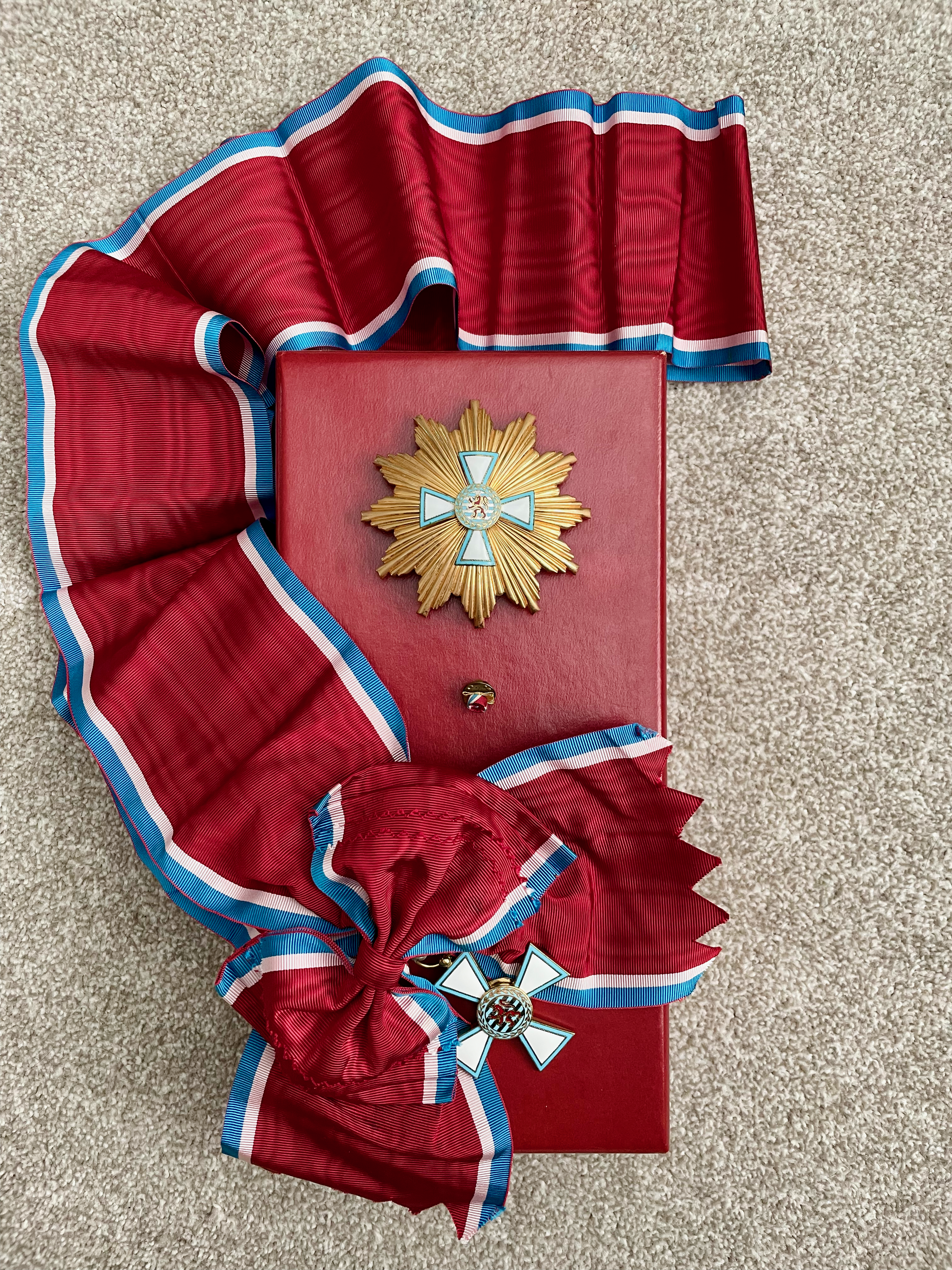
Grand Cross set.

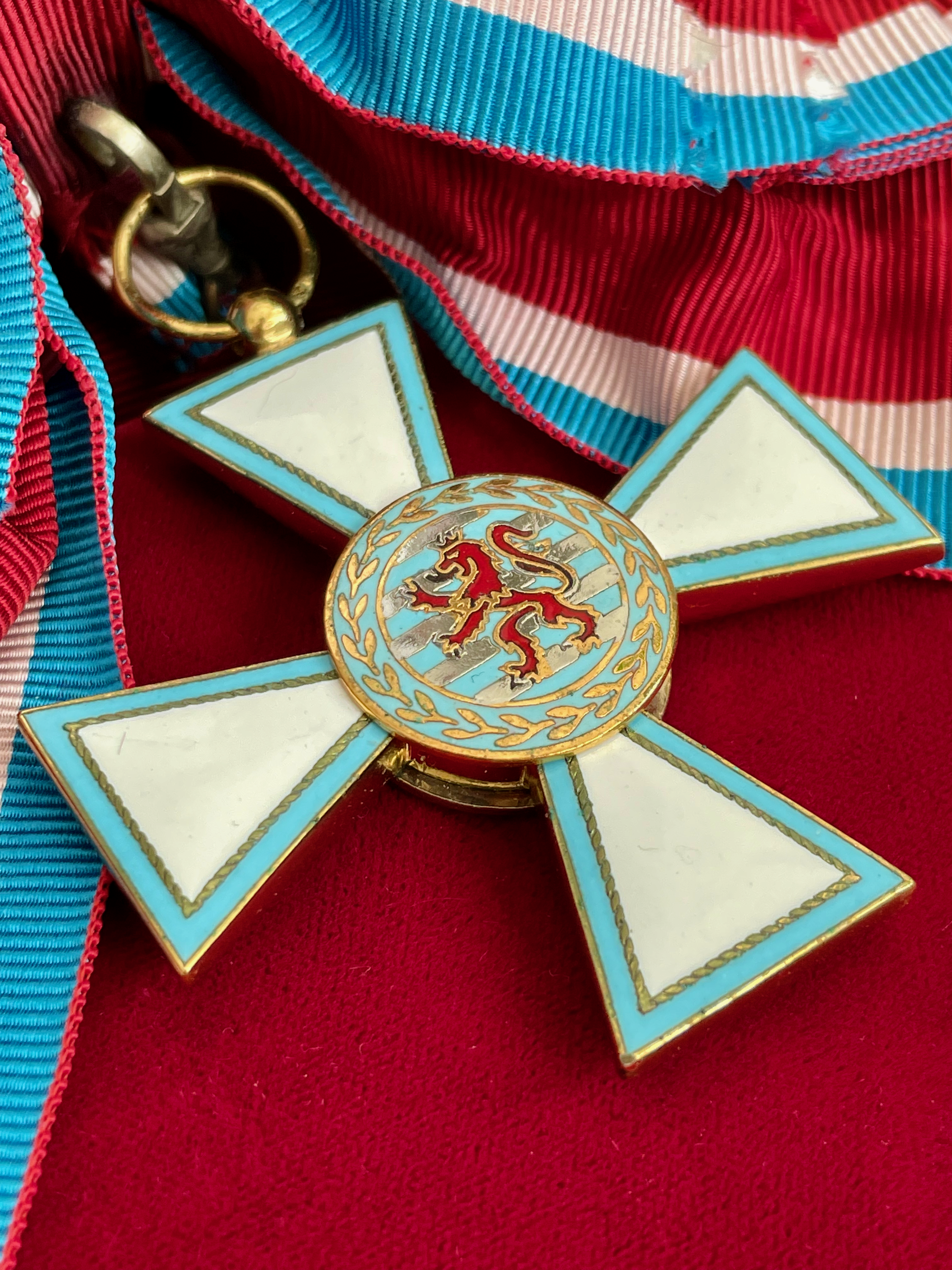
Grand Cross badge (obverse).

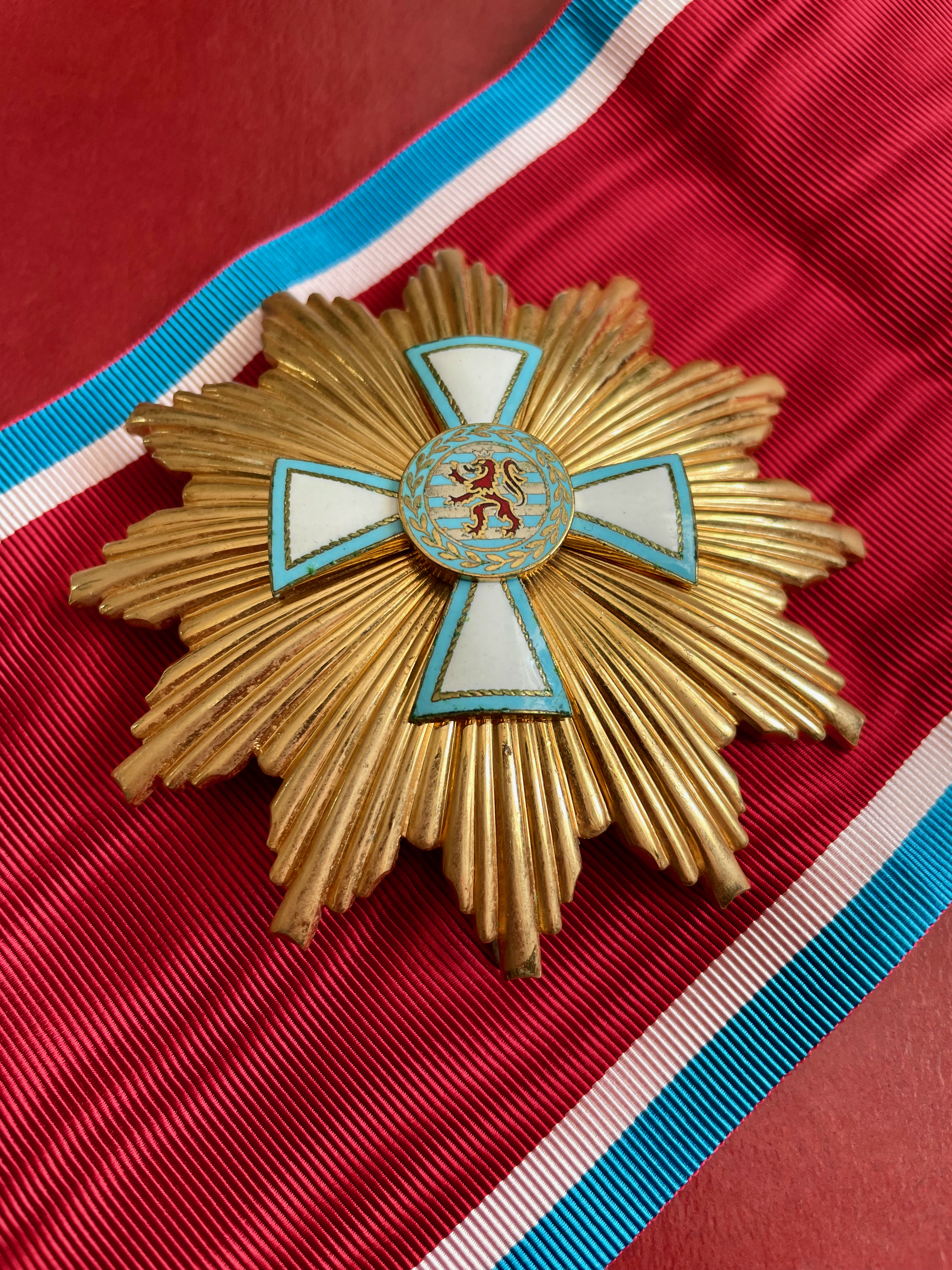
Grand Cross star.

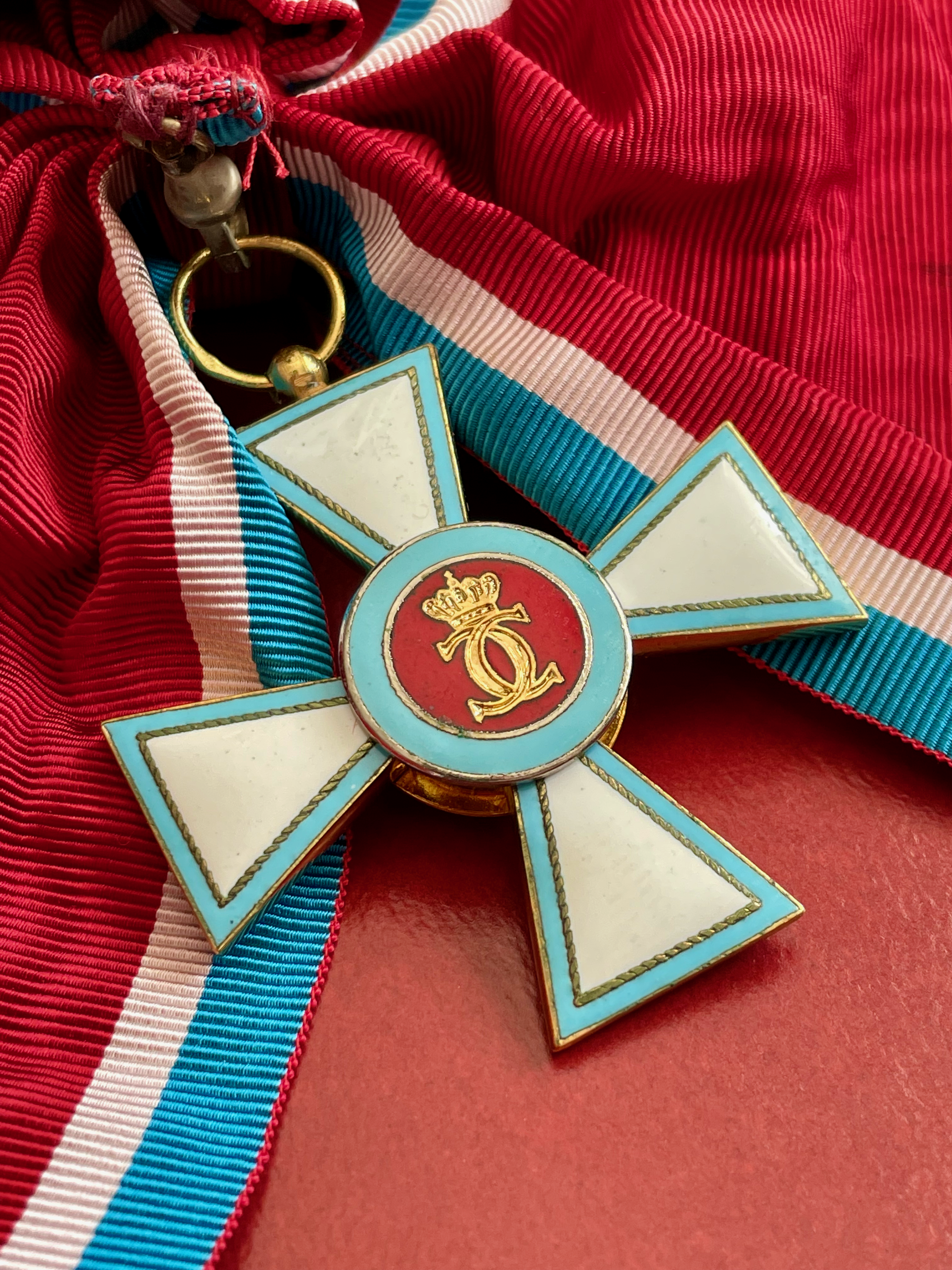
Grand Cross badge (reverse).

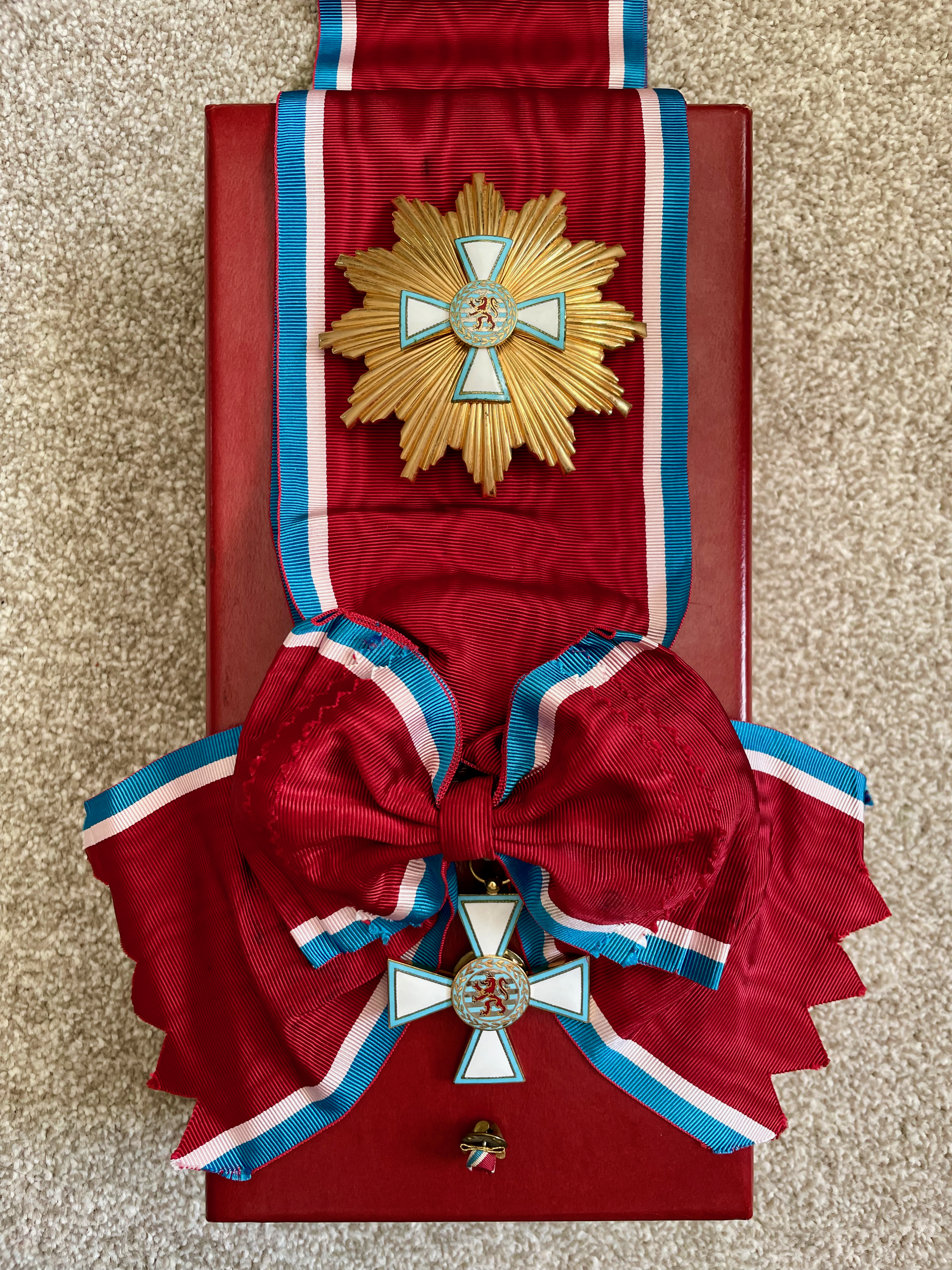
Grand Cross set.
