= List of ambassadors of Luxembourg to the United States =

Ambassador of Luxembourg to the United States
- Incumbent; Nicole Bintner-Bakshian since 2021
- Style: Her Excellency
- Appointer: Henri, Grand Duke of Luxembourg
- Formation: 1940
- Website: Embassy of Luxembourg in Washington

The Ambassador of Luxembourg to the United States is the Grand Duchy of Luxembourg's foremost diplomatic representative in the United States of America, and in charge of Luxembourg's diplomatic mission in the United States.

In addition, the ambassador serves concurrently as the non-resident ambassador to Canada, non-resident ambassador to Mexico, and permanent observer to the Organization of American States, all of which are ambassadorial positions in their own right.

The embassy is in Washington DC, and was opened by the government in exile in 1940.

== List of heads of mission ==
=== Ambassador to the United States ===
- Hugues Le Gallais (1940–1958)
- Georges Heisbourg (1958–1964)
- Maurice Steinmetz (1964–1969)
- Jean Wagner (1969–1974)
- Adrien Meisch (1974–1983)
- Paul Peters (1983–1987)
- André Philippe (1987–1991)
- Alphonse Berns (1991–1998)
- Arlette Conzemius (1998–2005)
- Joseph Weyland (2005–2008)
- Jean-Paul Senninger (2008 -2012)
- Jean-Louis Wolzfeld (2012-2016)
- Sylvie Lucas (2016–2019)
- Gaston Stronck (2019-2021)
- Nicole Bintner-Bakshian (2021-present)
