= Harold Charles d'Aspremont Lynden =

Belgian politician (1914–1967)

Harold René Charles Marie, comte d'Aspremont Lynden (17 January 1914 – 1 April 1967) was a Belgian cabinet minister, politician of the PSC-CVP and Cavalry Lieutenant-Colonel. He is also notable as Belgium's last Minister of African Affairs (1960-1961), serving as such in Gaston Eyskens' third cabinet. Lynden has been accused of complicy in the 1961 assassination of Congolese Prime Minister Patrice Lumumba.

== Early life ==
Harold René Charles Marie d'Aspremont Lynden was born in Brussels on January 17, 1914. His parents were Count Charles d'Aspremont Lynden and Edith de Favereau, daughter of Paul de Favereau. He belonged to the Aspremont-Lynden Belgian noble family.

After studying classics at Maredsous Abbey from 1926 to 1931, he graduated from the Catholic University of Leuven as a doctor of law in July 1936. He completed his compulsory military service as a reserve officer in the 13th Line Regiment at Namur (1936–37) before returning to Leuven to study social and political economics.

D'Aspremont Lynden's studies were interrupted by the outbreak of World War Two and the general mobilisation of Belgium in September 1939. He participated in the Eighteen Days Campaign in 1940, being captured by German forces on May 28. D'Aspremont Lynden was subsequently released on June 14. While working as a secretary for René Griendl—the German-appointed temporary governor of Luxembourg—from 1940 to 1943, he began to participate in the Secret Army resistance. He rejoined active service from December 1944 to August 1945, rising to the rank of lieutenant during operations focused in southeastern Belgium.

== Political career ==
After the war d'Aspremont Lynden became a member of the town council and mayor of Natoye (1947-1967) and senator for the province of Namur (1949–54 and 1961–67).

=== Involvement in the assassination of Patrice Lumumba ===
In the early 21st century, writer Ludo De Witte found documents arguing that the Belgian authorities were involved in the assassination of Congolese Prime Minister Patrice Lumumba. Count d'Aspremont Lynden, who had been tasked with organising Katanga's secession, on 6 October 1960, sent a cable to Katanga saying that policy from now on would be the "definitive elimination of Patrice Lumumba". Lynden had also insisted on 15 January 1961, that an imprisoned Lumumba should be sent to Katanga. According to De Witte, this was essentially a death sentence for Lumumba.

== Personal life ==
His daughter Catherine married Jean-Pierre Berghmans, an industrialist who was the head of the Lhoist group. He died in Natoye in 1967.

== Honours ==
- Commander of the Ordre de Léopold,
- Knight of the Ordre de Léopold with palms
- Croix de Guerre 1940 with palms
- Médaille de la Résistance 1940-1945,
- Médaille commémorative de la guerre 1940-1945 with crossed sabres
- Commander of the Ordre d'Orange-Nassau of the Netherlands
- King's Medal for Courage in the Cause of Freedom
