= Hugues Le Gallais =

Diplomat from Luxembourg

Personal details
- Born: 15 May 1896; Dommeldange, Luxembourg
- Died: December 23, 1964 (aged 68); Venice, Italy

Hugues Le Gallais (1896–1964) was a Luxembourgish diplomat.

Le Gallais was born in Dommeldange on 15 May 1896. He attended the University of Liège, Belgium, and received further technical education at the University of Zurich, Switzerland.

He died in Venice on 23 December 1964.

Diplomatic posts
Preceded by Inaugural holder	Ambassador to the United States; 1940 – 1958	Succeeded by Georges Heisbourg (1958–1964)
