= Jean-Pierre Berghmans =

Belgian billionaire

Baron Jean-Pierre Berghmans
- Born: Jean-Pierre Léon Louis Joseph Marie Berghmans; January 23, 1949 (age 77); Namêche, Belgium
- Citizenship: Belgian
- Education: Université catholique de Louvain; INSEAD (MBA)
- Occupations: Businessman, art collector, and philanthropist
- Title: Chairman of the Lhoist Group
- Term: 2011–present
- Spouse: Countess Catherine d'Aspremont Lynden (m. 1972)
- Children: 3
- Parent(s): Jean Berghmans; Baroness Elisabeth Lhoist
- Relatives: Harold Charles d'Aspremont Lynden (father-in-law); Léon Lhoist (grandfather)
- Awards: Commander of the Order of the Crown (Belgium); Knight of the Legion of Honour (France)

Baron Jean-Pierre Léon Louis Joseph Marie Berghmans (born 23 January 1949) is a Belgian billionaire businessman, art collector, and philanthropist. He is the chairman of the Lhoist Group, a family-owned multinational corporation headquartered in Limelette, Belgium, which is the world's leading producer of lime, dolomite and mineral products. Following the sale of Lhoist's North American operations to Martin Marietta Materials in June 2026 for US$13.5 billion, the Berghmans family became the wealthiest family in Belgium, with an estimated fortune of over €12.5 billion.

== Early life and education ==
Jean-Pierre Berghmans was born on 23 January 1949 in Namêche, in the Province of Namur, Belgium, the eldest son of Jean Berghmans and Baroness Elisabeth Lhoist . Through his mother, he is a descendant of the Lhoist industrial dynasty and the grandson of Léon Lhoist, who founded the family's lime and dolomite business in 1924. His paternal grandfather, originally from Maastricht in the Netherlands, had worked as a cart driver and tobacco vendor, while his great-grandfather had been a butcher specialising in pork. He is the eldest brother of Vincent Berghmans, vice-managing director of Lhoist, and Jacques Berghmans, co-founder of asset manager TreeTop.

Berghmans obtained a degree in applied economics from the Université catholique de Louvain in 1971 and later a Master of Business Administration (MBA) from INSEAD in Fontainebleau, France, in 1974.

== Career ==
Berghmans joined the family business, the Lhoist Group, in 1974, shortly after completing his MBA. He initially worked alongside his cousin Léon-Albert Lhoist, who died prematurely in 2011. In 1979, he was appointed chief executive officer and a member of the board of directors, and in 1985 he became chairman of the executive committee. From 2000 to 2011, he also served as managing director of Lhoist's British subsidiary. In 2011, he became chairman of the group.

During his tenure, the Lhoist Group expanded to the American continent in the 1980s through acquisitions including a stake in the Chemical Lime Company. In the 1990s, the group expanded into Eastern Europe, Scandinavia and Germany, where it acquired the Rheinkalk plant in Wülfrath, now Europe's largest lime factory. During the 2000s, further acquisitions were made in Southern Europe, Brazil and Asia, including the Malaysian operations inaugurated in Tapah in 2016. In 2022, the Berghmans branch of the family bought out the Lhoist branch, ending a joint family ownership and the group's shareholding was subsequently consolidated in the Luxembourg-based holding Financière de Gestions Internationales (FGI).

== Personal life ==
In 1972, Berghmans married Countess Catherine d'Aspremont Lynden, daughter of Count Harold Charles d'Aspremont Lynden (1914–1967), who had served as mayor, senator and minister. The couple has three daughters. The family resides in the Condroz region of Wallonia, with residences including the Château de Hoyoux and the Château de Namêche.

== Art collection and philanthropy ==
Since 1990, when Lhoist built its new headquarters in Limelette, Berghmans has developed one of the largest private art collections in Belgium. The collection, developed with curator Jacqueline d'Amécourt and advisor Pierre Apraxine, comprises more than 2,000 works by over 400 artists, with an emphasis on contemporary photography. It includes works by Louise Bourgeois, Tony Cragg, William Eggleston, Louise Lawler, Kiki Smith and Hiroshi Sugimoto, as well as site-specific installations at Limelette by Pierre Alechinsky, Anish Kapoor, Richard Long, Sol LeWitt, Ulrich Rückriem and James Turrell. Portions of the photographic collection have been shown publicly at the Musée de la Photographie in Charleroi in 2016.

Berghmans co-founded the Maison de la Radio Flagey s.a., which renovated the former public broadcasting building in Ixelles, Brussels, into a cultural venue; he is also the co-founder of the Museum of Europe in Brussels, an administrator of the Children's Museum in Ixelles, and the co-founder and president of the Club des Combins, a Swiss insurance initiative supporting mountain guides.

== Honours ==
On 22 April 2005, Berghmans was raised to the Belgian hereditary nobility with the personal title of Baron by King Albert II. Two of his brothers were subsequently granted hereditary nobility later in 2005, and his mother received the personal title of baroness.

His other distinctions include:

- Commander of the Order of the Crown (Belgium, 2017)
- Knight of the Legion of Honour (France, 2005)
