= Ernest Krings =

Belgian jurist

Jules Ernest Gustaaf, Baron Krings (29 September 1920 – 1 July 2017) was a Belgian judge and legal scholar.

During his career he became procurator general at the Court of Cassation, a royal commissioner for the revision of the Judicial Code, and a professor of law at the Free University of Brussels. On 25 November 1993 he received a grant of hereditary nobility with the personal title of baron from Albert II of Belgium. Ernest Krings died on 1 July 2017 at the age of 96.

== Honours ==
- 1993: Created Baron Krings by HM King Albert II, Munus et Fidelitas.
- Member of the Royal Flemish Academy of Belgium for Science and the Arts
- Grand Cordon in the Order of Leopold.
- Knight Grand Cross in the Order of the Crown.
- Grand Officer in the Order of Leopold II.
- Grand Officer in the Order of Orange-Nassau.
- Grand Officer in the Order of the Oak Crown.
