= Order of the Oak Crown =

Heraldic order of the Grand Duchy of Luxembourg

Order of the Oak Crown Ordre de la Couronne de chêne (French) Eichenlaubkronenorden (German) Eechelaafkrounenuerden (Luxembourgish)
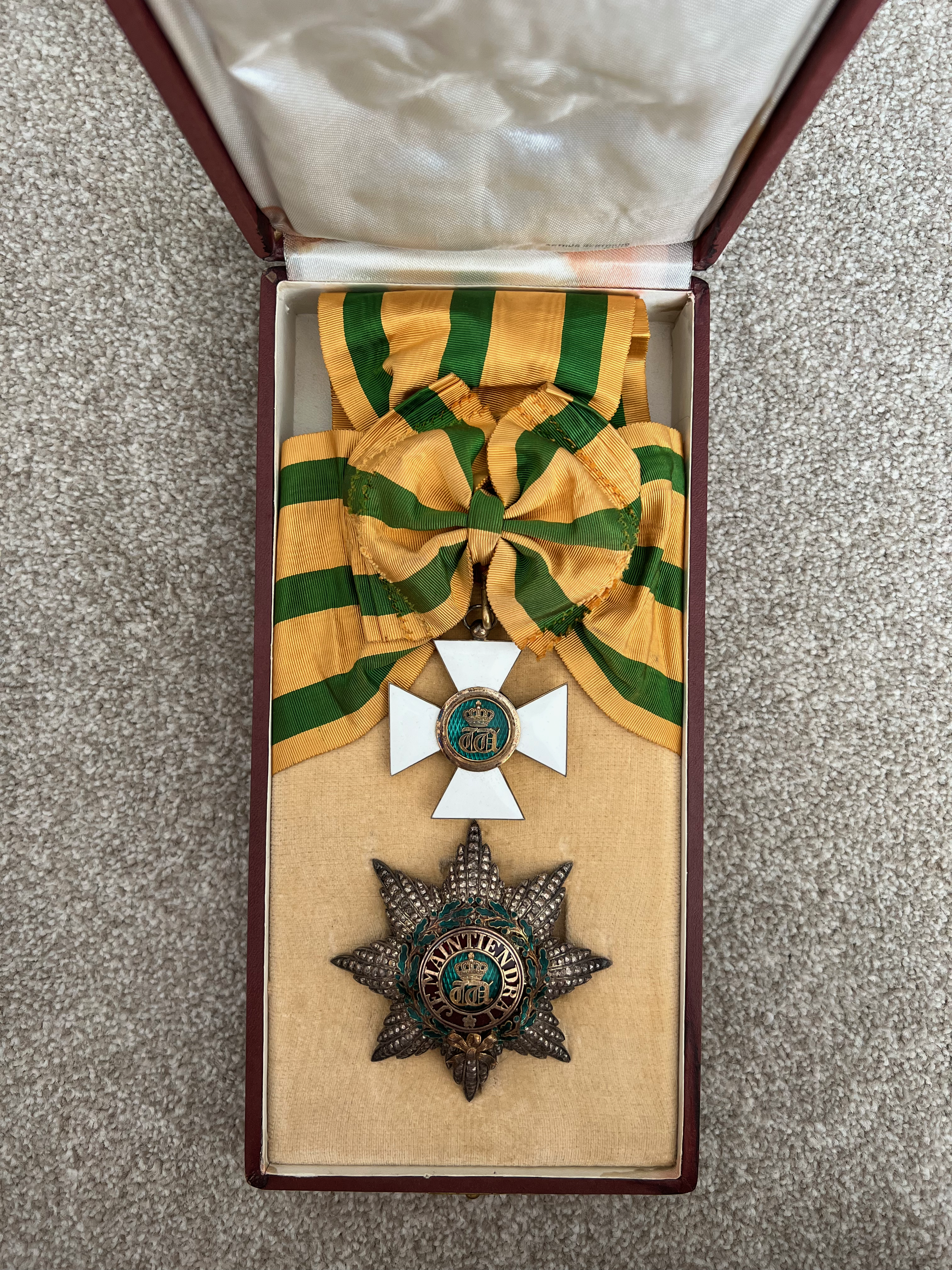
- Grand Cross set of the order

Awarded by Grand Duke of Luxembourg
- Type: Chivalric order with five grades
- Established: 29 December 1841
- Motto: Je maintiendrai ("I will maintain")
- Eligibility: Eligible to members of government, deputies, state councillors, civil servants, elected representatives and personnel of municipal administrations, key players of the economic, social, cultural or sport sectors as well as to volunteers. Can also be awarded to foreigners.
- Awarded for: Luxembourg citizens who performed outstanding civil and military services, as well for distinguished artists who made outstanding achievements.
- Status: Currently constituted
- Grand Master: Guillaume V, Grand Duke of Luxembourg
- Chancellor: Luc Frieden
- Grades: Grand Cross, Grand Officer, Commander, Officer, Knight
- Former grades: Knight Grand Cross, Knight of the Star, Knight Commander

Precedence
- Next (higher): Order of Adolphe of Nassau
- Next (lower): Order of Merit of the Grand Duchy of Luxembourg
- Ribbon bar of the order

The Order of the Oak Crown (French: Ordre de la Couronne de chêne, German: Eichenlaubkronenorden, Luxembourgish: Eechelaafkrounenuerden) is an order of the Grand Duchy of Luxembourg.

== History ==
The Order of the Oak Crown was established in 1841 by Grand Duke William II, who was also King of the Netherlands. At that time, the Grand Duchy of Luxembourg and the Kingdom of the Netherlands were in personal union in which both nations shared the same person as their respective head of state, though remaining as two distinct and independent nations. Although the order was legally a Luxembourgish honour, it was often used by William II and his successor, King-Grand Duke William III, as a house order of the Nassau dynasty to reward Dutch subjects, beyond the control of the Dutch government.

William II conferred membership of the order on fewer than 30 recipients. His successor, William III, liked the ability to confer membership of this order at his sole discretion, and awarded 300 decorations on the day of his investiture alone. In the following years, hundreds of additional awards of the order were made. Indeed, there were so many recipients in the Kingdom of the Netherlands itself that the order was widely (and falsely) regarded as a Dutch honour.

Membership of the Order of the Oak Crown ceased to be awarded to Dutch subjects in 1890, when Queen Wilhelmina, as the only remaining member of the House of Orange-Nassau, succeeded her father as new Queen of the Netherlands. Since the Erneuter Erbverein, the Salic Law-based house-treaty between the two branches of the House of Nassau (the junior branch of Orange-Nassau and the senior branch of Nassau-Weilburg (present-day Luxembourg-Nassau)), did not allow women to succeed to the throne of Luxembourg as long as male heirs of the House of Nassau (in both branches) existed, the throne of Luxembourg went to a German relative of the new Dutch queen, also her maternal great-uncle Adolphe, Duke of Nassau, who became Grand Duke of Luxembourg at age 73. The Order of the Oak Crown remained a solely Luxembourgish honour; subsequently, the Netherlands established the Order of Orange-Nassau instead.

Since the accession of Grand Duke Adolphe, the order has been primarily used as an award for Luxembourgish citizens, although membership has occasionally been conferred on foreigners, mainly on members of foreign royal families or on eminent foreigners with Luxembourgish ancestors.

The Grand Duke of Luxembourg is the Grand Master of the order.

== Grades and insignia ==
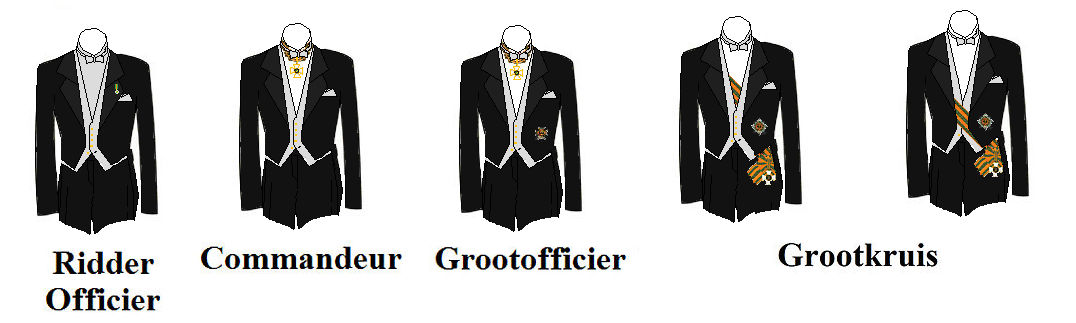

Officer's cross

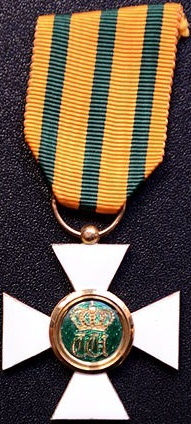
Knight's cross

=== Origin ===
After the abdication of King-Grand Duke William I in 1841, his successor William II granted Luxembourg a written anti-liberal constitution (called the Charter) in order to strengthen his authority over the country. At the same occasion, he established the Order of the Oak Crown with the idea to be able to reward loyal supporters of his regime in liberal-minded Luxembourg.

The badge, the ribbon, and the (then) four-class hierarchy of the order were inspired by the Russian Order of St. George. This was probably due to the fact that William II was married to a daughter of Emperor Paul I of Russia, and that he had received the Order of St. George for his meritorious command in the Battle of Waterloo.

=== Grades ===
Nowadays, the order consists of five grades:

1. Grand Cross – wears the badge on a sash on the right shoulder, and the plaque on the left chest;
2. Grand Officer (as of 1858) – wears the badge on a necklet, and the plaque on the left chest;
3. Commander – wears the badge on a necklet;
4. Officer (as of 1858) – wears the badge on a chest ribbon with rosette on the left chest;
5. Knight – wears the badge on a chest ribbon on the left chest;

plus gilt, silver and bronze medals, who wear the medal on a chest ribbon on the left chest.

Ribbon bars
Grand Cross	Grand Officer	Commander	Officer	Knight
Gold medal; later, Gilt medal		Silver medal		Bronze medal

=== Insignia ===
- The badge of the order is a gilt cross pattée, enamelled in white; the Officer class has a green enamelled oak wreath between the arms of the cross. The central disc bears the crowned monogram "W" (for William) on a green enamel background.
- The plaque of the order is (for Grand Cross) an eight-pointed faceted silver star, or (for Grand Officer) a faceted silver Maltese Cross. The central disc bears the crowned monogram "W" (for William) on a green enamel background, surrounded by a red enamel ring with the motto Je Maintiendrai ("I Will Maintain", now the national motto of the Netherlands), in turn surrounded by a green enamelled oak wreath.
- The medal of the order is in an octagonal shape, with the motif of the badge of the Order without enamel on the obverse, and an oak wreath without enamel on the reverse.
- The ribbon of the order is yellow-orange moiré with three dark green stripes. The colors are said to be inspired by the oak forests and the fields of rue of the Luxembourg countryside.

== Recipients ==
Grand Crosses

- Shinzo Abe
- Alexander, Prince of Orange
- Alexis, Prince of Bentheim and Steinfurt
- Anne, Princess Royal
- Beatrix of the Netherlands
- Joseph Bech
- Prince Bernhard of Saxe-Weimar-Eisenach (1792–1862)
- Xavier Bettel
- Otto von Bismarck
- Aníbal Cavaco Silva
- Charles XV
- Charles Augustus, Hereditary Grand Duke of Saxe-Weimar-Eisenach (1844–1894)
- Charles III of the United Kingdom
- Charlotte, Grand Duchess of Luxembourg
- Princess Christina of the Netherlands
- Winston Churchill
- Francesco Cossiga
- Charles de Broqueville
- Théophile de Lantsheere
- Laurentius Nicolaas Deckers
- Rudolf von Delbrück
- Édouard Descamps
- Augustin Dumon-Dumortier
- Dwight D. Eisenhower
- Giustino Fortunato (1777–1862)
- Prince Frederick of Prussia (1794–1863)
- Hans Globke
- Guillaume V, Grand Duke of Luxembourg
- Camille Gutt
- Dennis Hastert
- Henri, Grand Duke of Luxembourg
- Prince Henry of the Netherlands (1820–1879)
- Jean, Grand Duke of Luxembourg
- Jos van Kemenade
- Thanat Khoman
- Thanom Kittikachorn
- Marie-Pierre Kœnig
- Frits Korthals Altes
- Auguste, Baron Lambermont
- Edmond Leburton
- Philippe Leclerc de Hauteclocque
- Charles de Limburg Stirum
- Ludwig Wilhelm, Prince of Bentheim and Steinfurt
- Joseph Luns
- Sicco Mansholt
- Marcellin Marbot
- Princess Margriet of the Netherlands
- Jaime de Marichalar
- Wilfried Martens
- Désiré-Joseph Mercier
- Joannes Josephus van Mulken
- Nursultan Nazarbayev
- Jean-Baptiste Nothomb
- Oscar II
- Pieter Oud
- Maurice de Patoul
- Pels Rijcken
- Jan Jacob Rochussen
- Josef van Schaik
- Emil von Schlitz
- Poul Schlüter
- Willem Scholten
- Emmanuel Servais
- Walter Bedell Smith
- Heinrich von Stephan
- Dirk Stikker
- Ludwig Freiherr von und zu der Tann-Rathsamhausen
- Iñaki Urdangarin
- Achille Van Acker
- Victor van Strydonck de Burkel
- Pieter van Vollenhoven
- Frans Weisglas
- Wilhelmina of the Netherlands
- Willem-Alexander of the Netherlands
- William, Prince of Wied
- Johan Witteveen
- August zu Eulenburg

Grand Officers

- Jozias van Aartsen
- François Altwies
- Hubert Biermans
- Theo Bot
- Hans van den Broek
- Piet Bukman
- Léon Delacroix
- Jean Hengen
- Clarence R. Huebner
- Dolf Joekes
- Henk Kamp
- Marga Klompé
- Rudolf de Korte
- Henk Korthals
- Ernest Krings
- Pierre Lardinois
- Auguste Laval
- Astrid Lulling
- Lunsford E. Oliver
- Johan Remkes
- Carl Romme
- Bauke Roolvink
- Onno Ruding
- Job de Ruiter
- Norbert Schmelzer
- Émile Speller
- Kees Staf
- Edzo Toxopeus
- Anne Vondeling
- Berend-Jan van Voorst tot Voorst

Commanders

- Victor Abens
- Willem Albarda
- Marie-Claude Beaud
- Laurens Jan Brinkhorst
- Bill Davidson (businessman)
- Wim Deetman
- Anthony van der Eb
- Jean Favier
- Rudi Fuchs
- Leendert Ginjaar
- Emile Haag
- Aloyse Hentgen
- Harold Hinde
- Jan Kohout
- Cornelis Kruseman
- René van der Linden
- Peter Maurer
- Léon Metz
- Liz Mohn
- Jan Willem Louis van Oordt
- Jean-Baptiste Piron
- Mikhail Mikhailovich Pleshkov
- Harry Alexander Smith
- Gerard Veringa
- Joris Voorhoeve
- Joseph Weyland

Officers

- Father Jean Bernard
- Hugo Gernsback
- Jean-Marie Halsdorf
- Joseph Hollman
- Oscar Koch
- Nicolae Petrescu-Comnen
- Salomon Verveer
- Henk Vonhoff
- Tjerk Westerterp
- Piet van Zeil

Knights

- Henry Attwell
- Jules Mersch
- Daniel Nordlander
- Aat van Rhijn
- Jean Soupert
- Gábor Harakály

Gold/Gilt Medal
Silver Medal
Bronze Medal
Ridders (Obsolete)

- Christoffel Bisschop
- Jan Willem van Borselen
- Arie Johannes Lamme

Unknown Class

- Clare Hibbs Armstrong
- Alphonse Berns
- John E. Dolibois
- Rémy Eiffes
- Peter C. Hains III
- Floris Adriaan van Hall
- Berend Heringa
- Courtney Hodges
- Henry J. Leir
- Perle Mesta
- Pierre Notting
- Théodore Pescatore
- Nico Ries
- Samuel Sarphati
- Nicolaas Scheltema
- Otto Schily
- Émile Servais
- Thaksin Shinawatra
- Albertus Willem Sijthoff
- Jan Szembek (diplomat)
- Robert A. Mandell
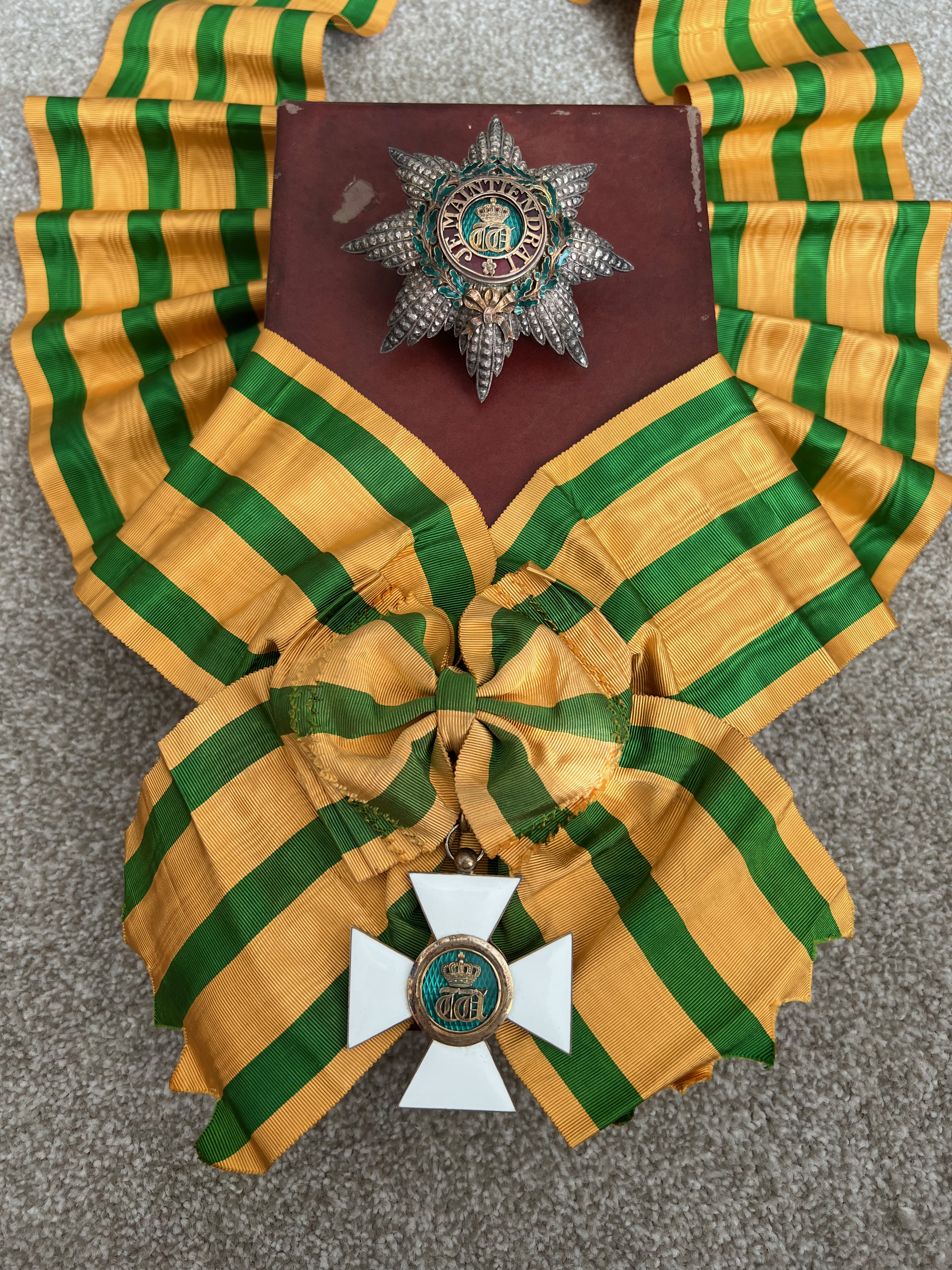
Grand Cross set of the order.

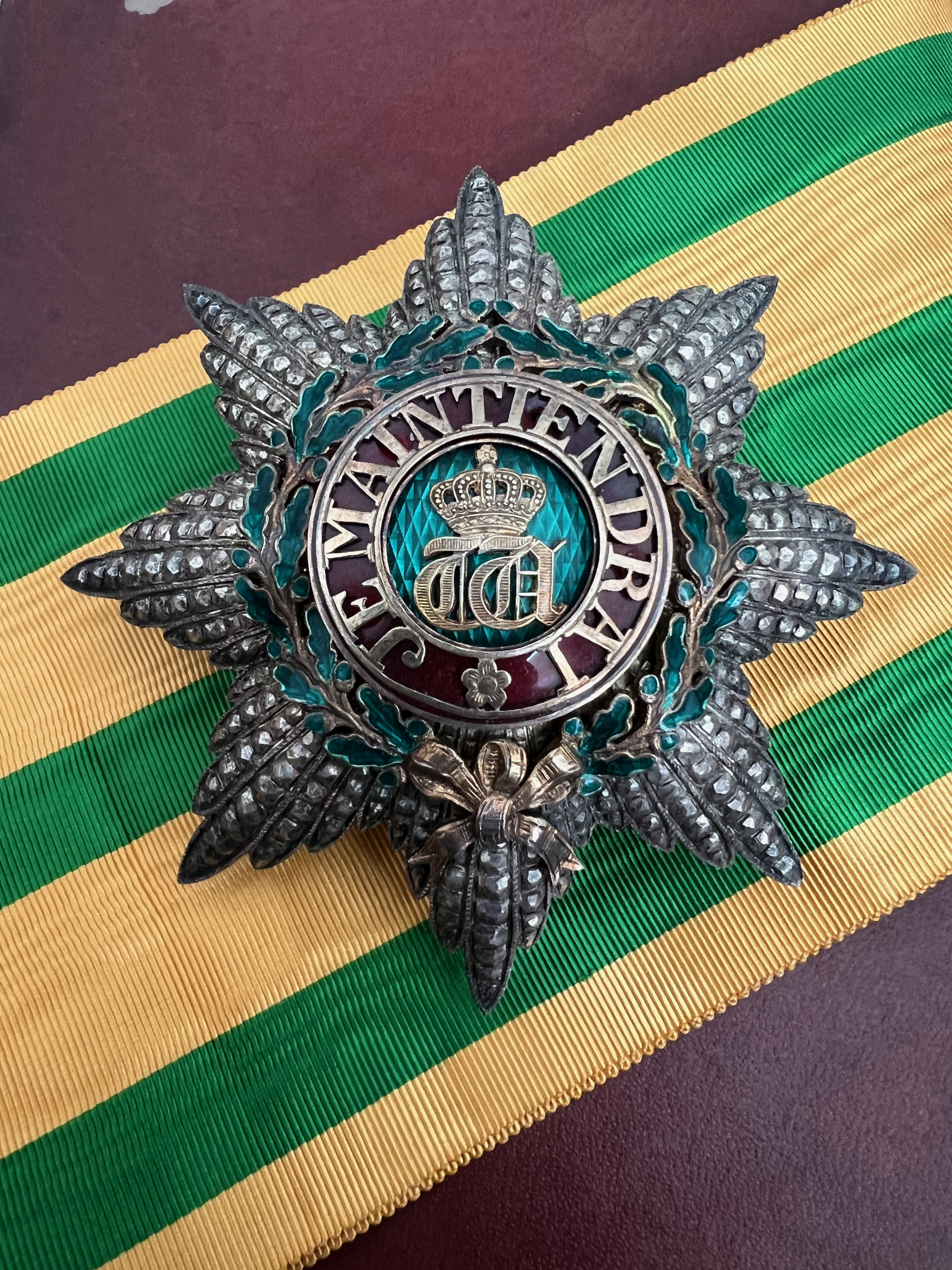
The Grand Cross star and sash.

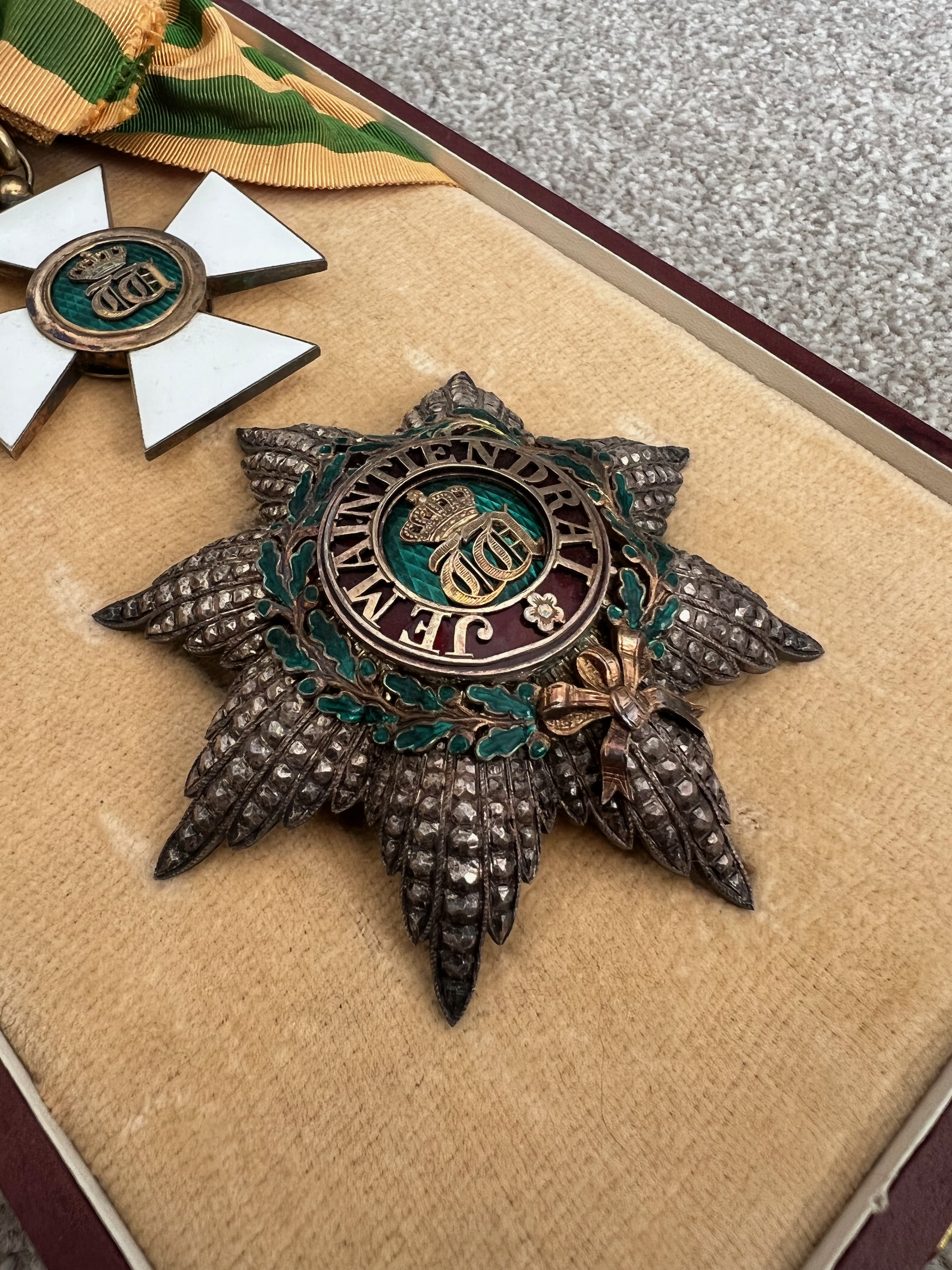
The star of the order.

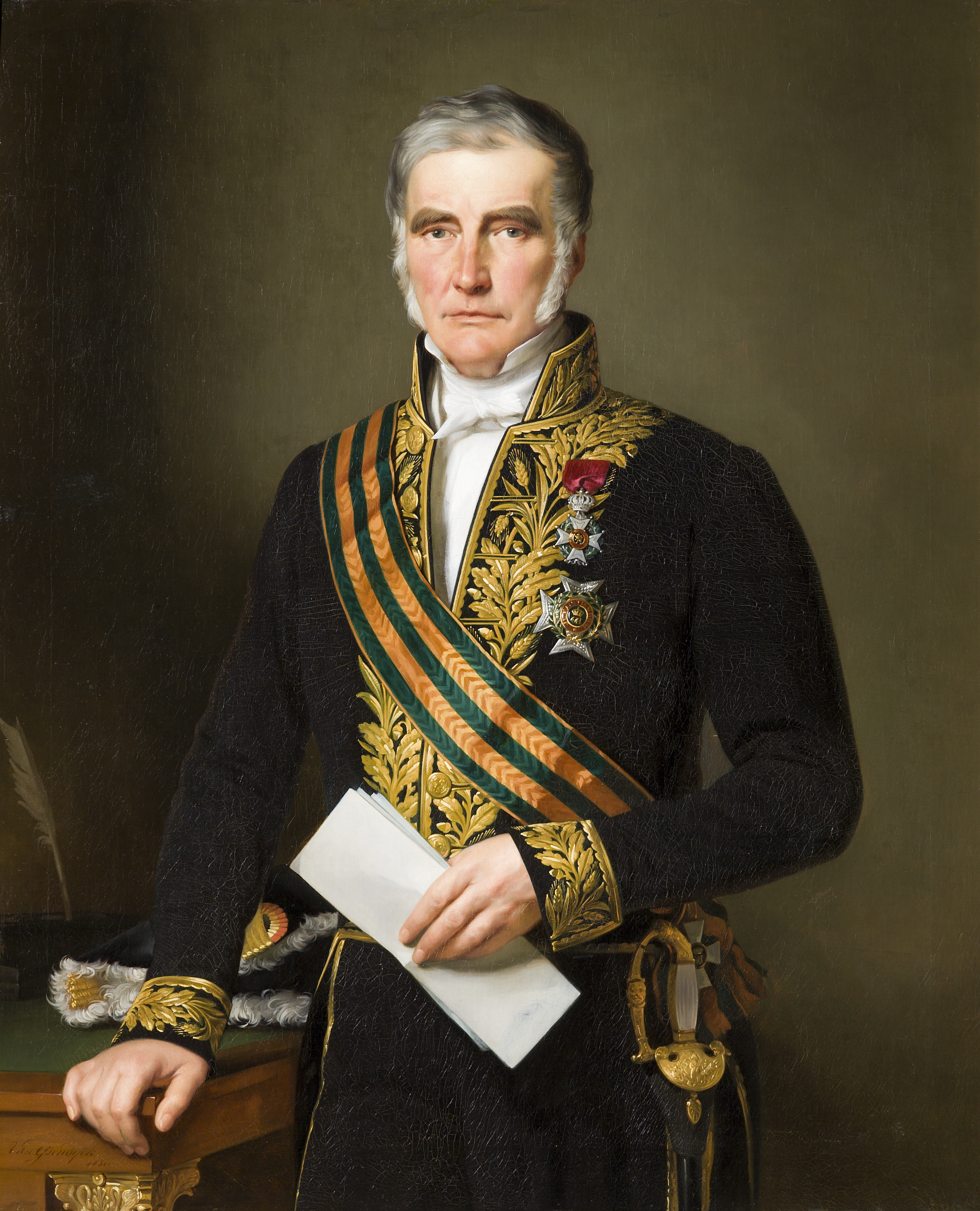
Augustine Dumon-Dumortier wearing the Grand Cross of the order back when the Grand Cross star resembled the Grand Officer of today.

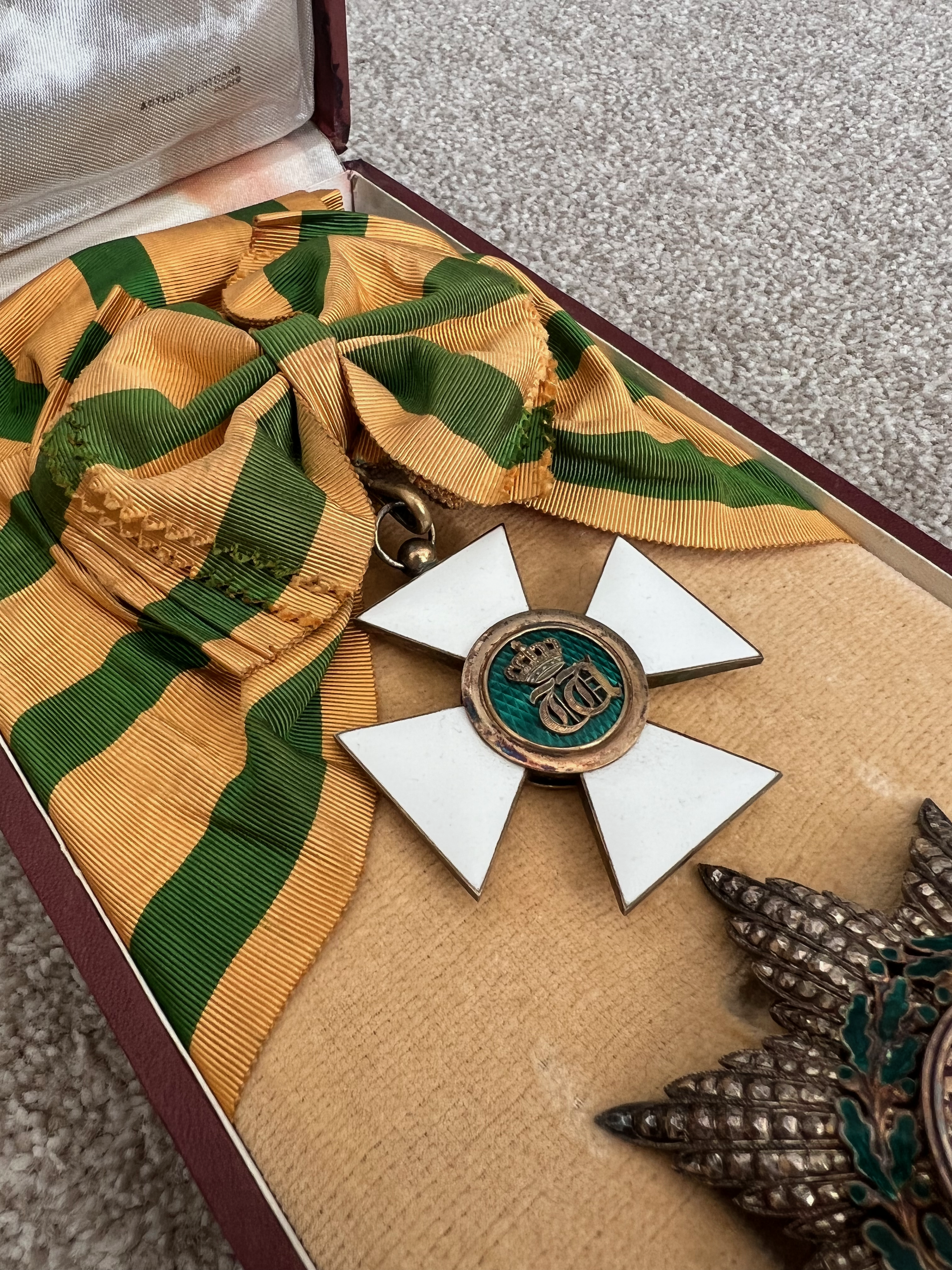
Close-up of the Grand Cross badge.

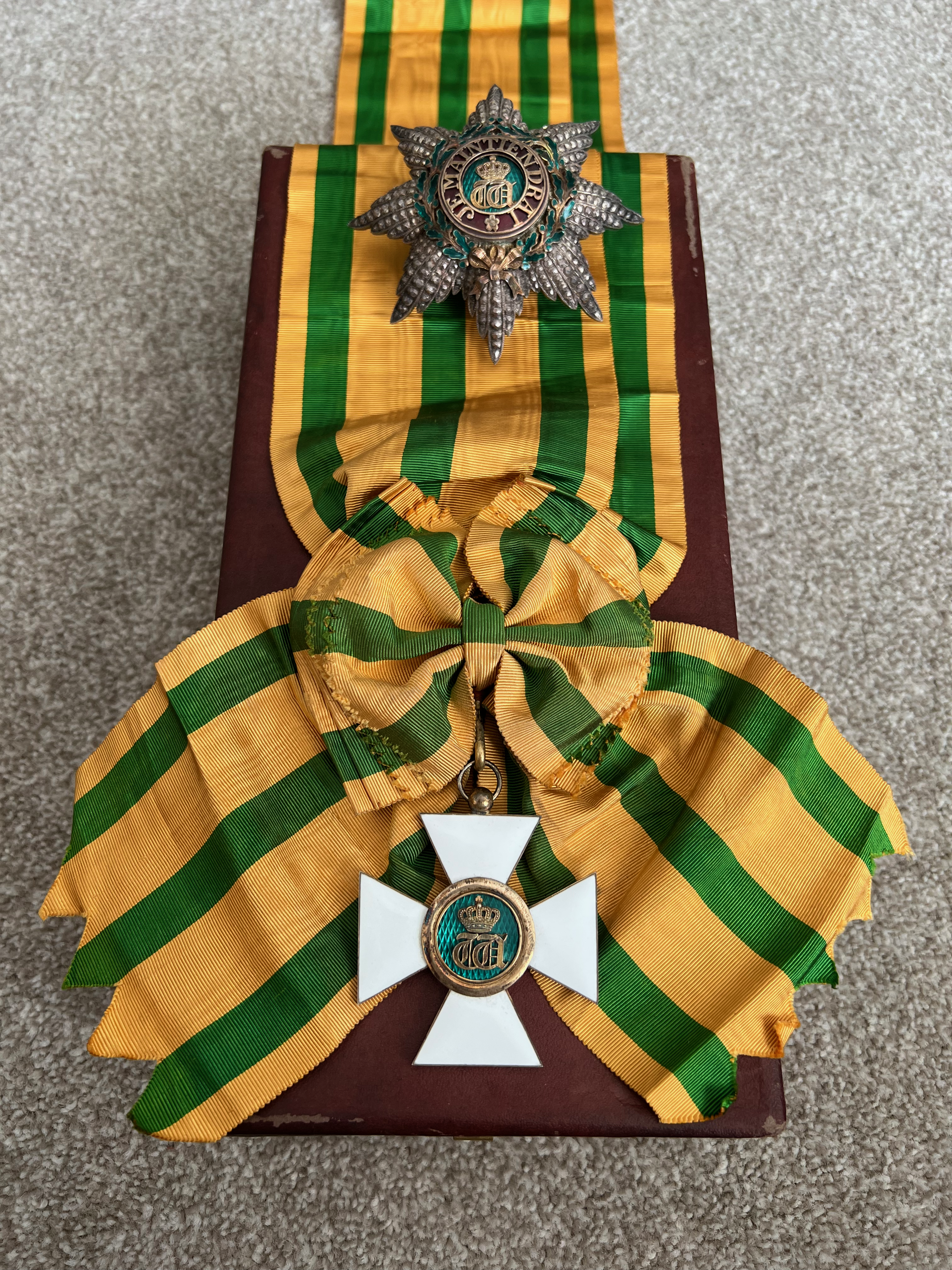
Grand Cross set.

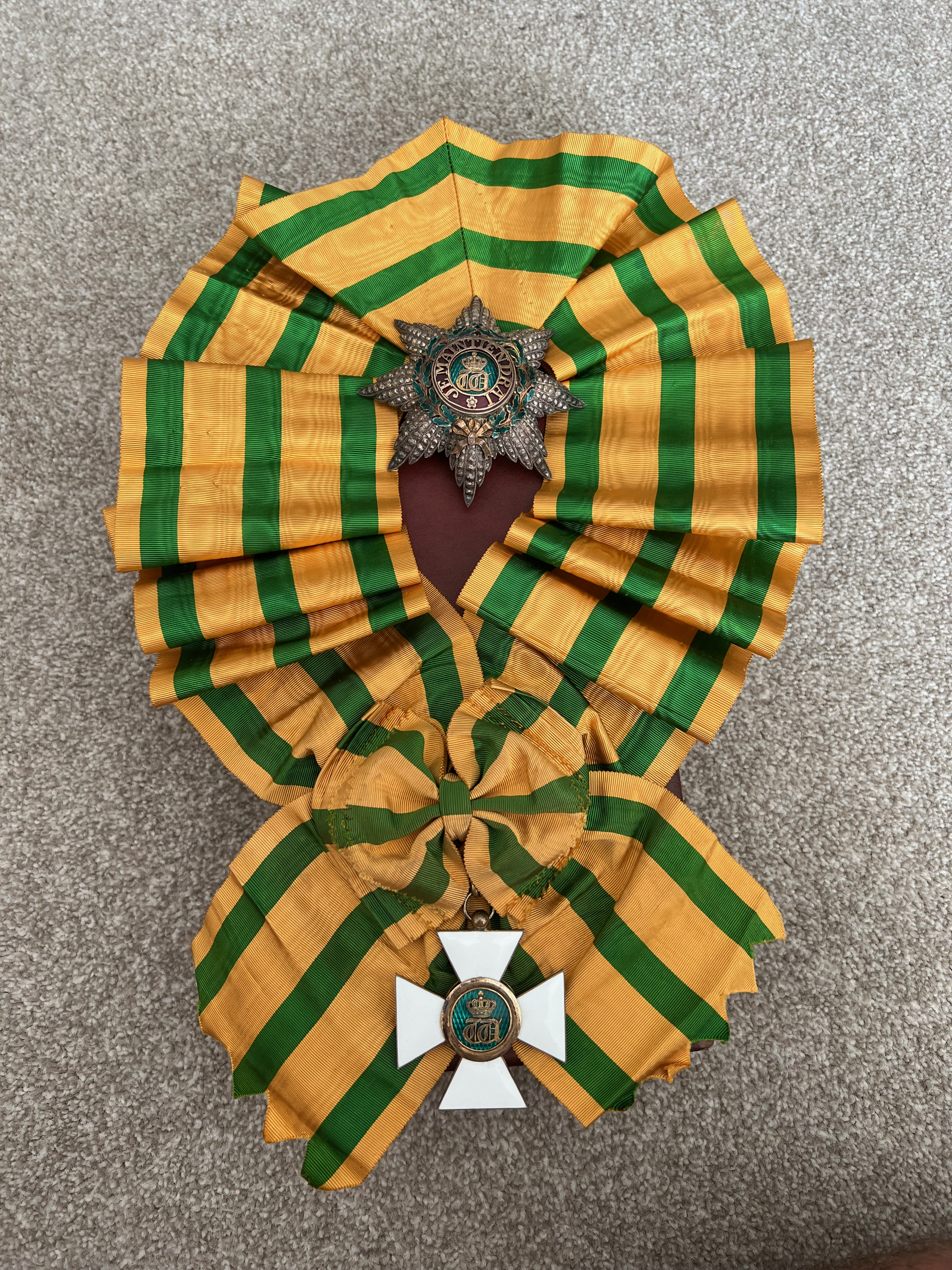
The Grand Cross sash, badge and star of the order.

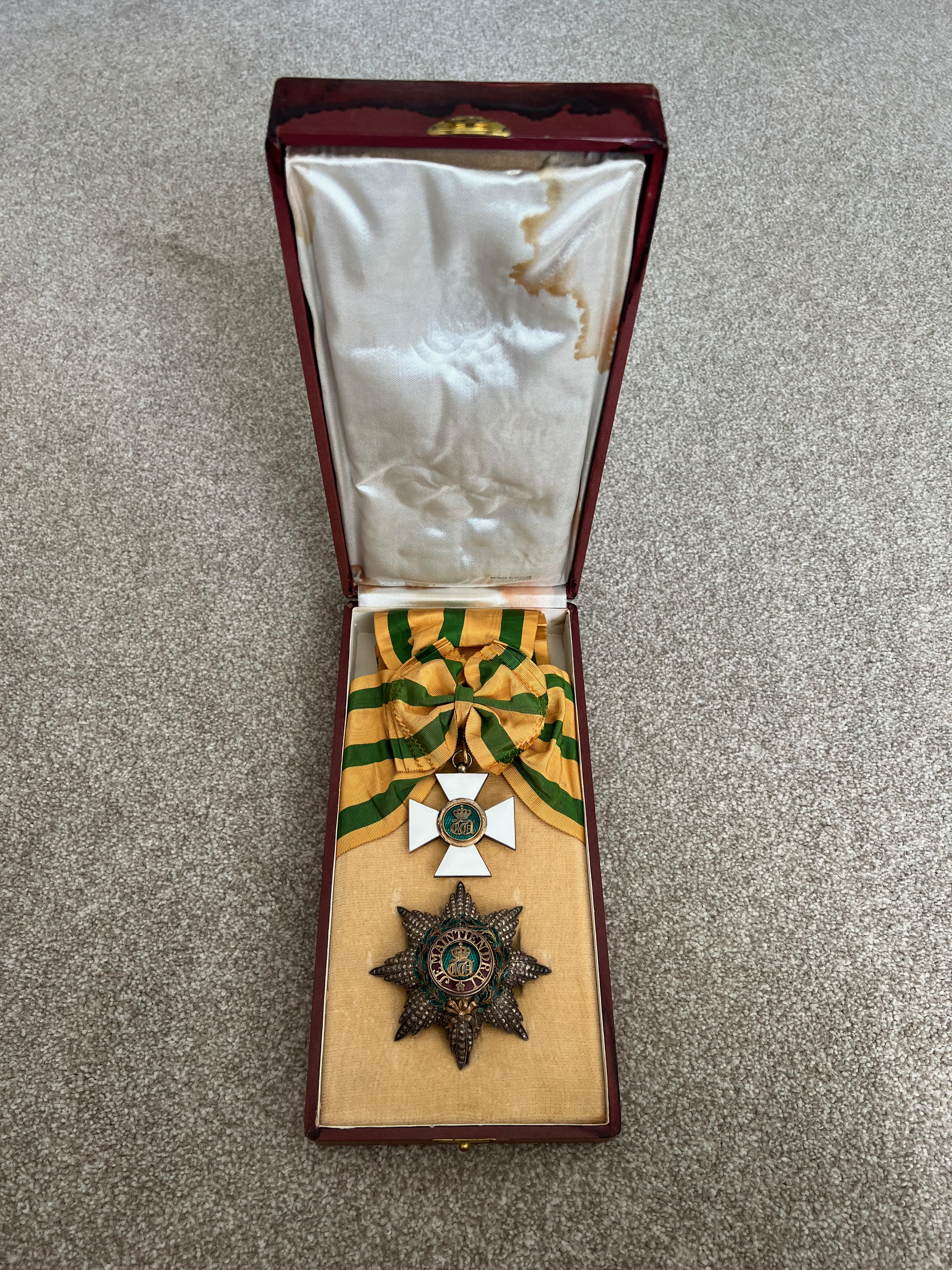
Grand Cross.

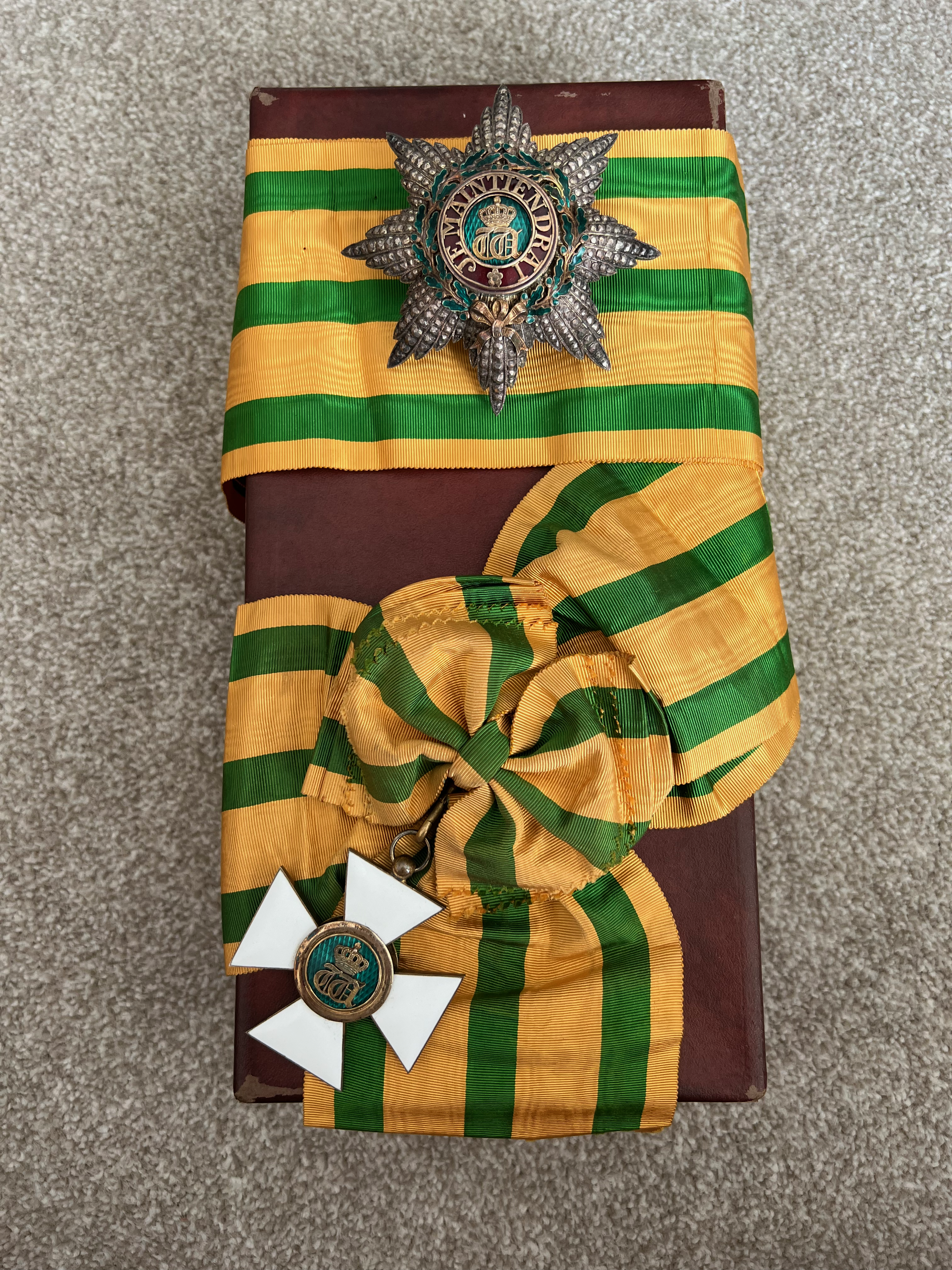
Grand Cross.

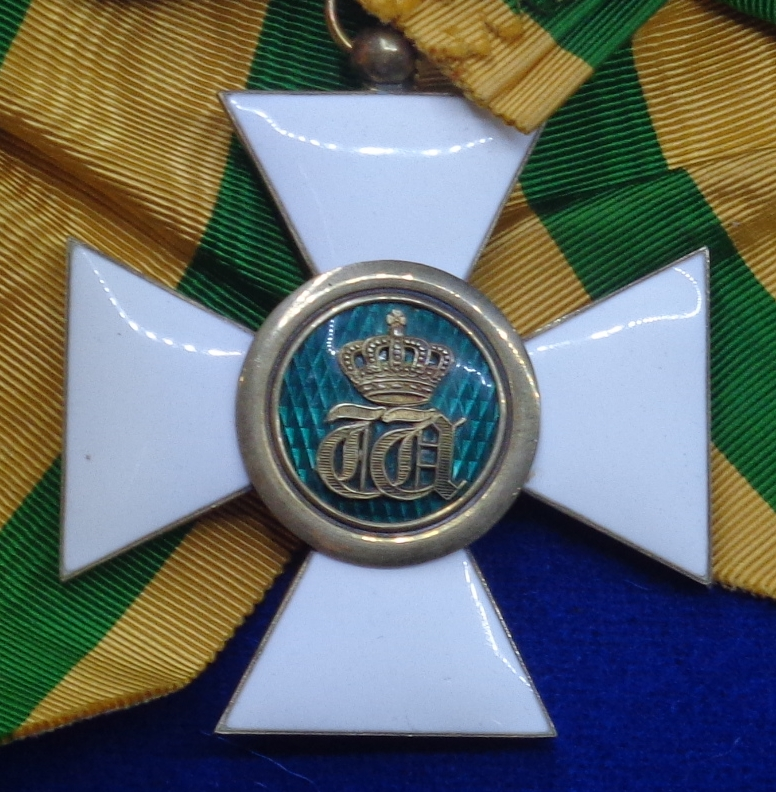
Grand Cross badge showing the royal monogram of William II.

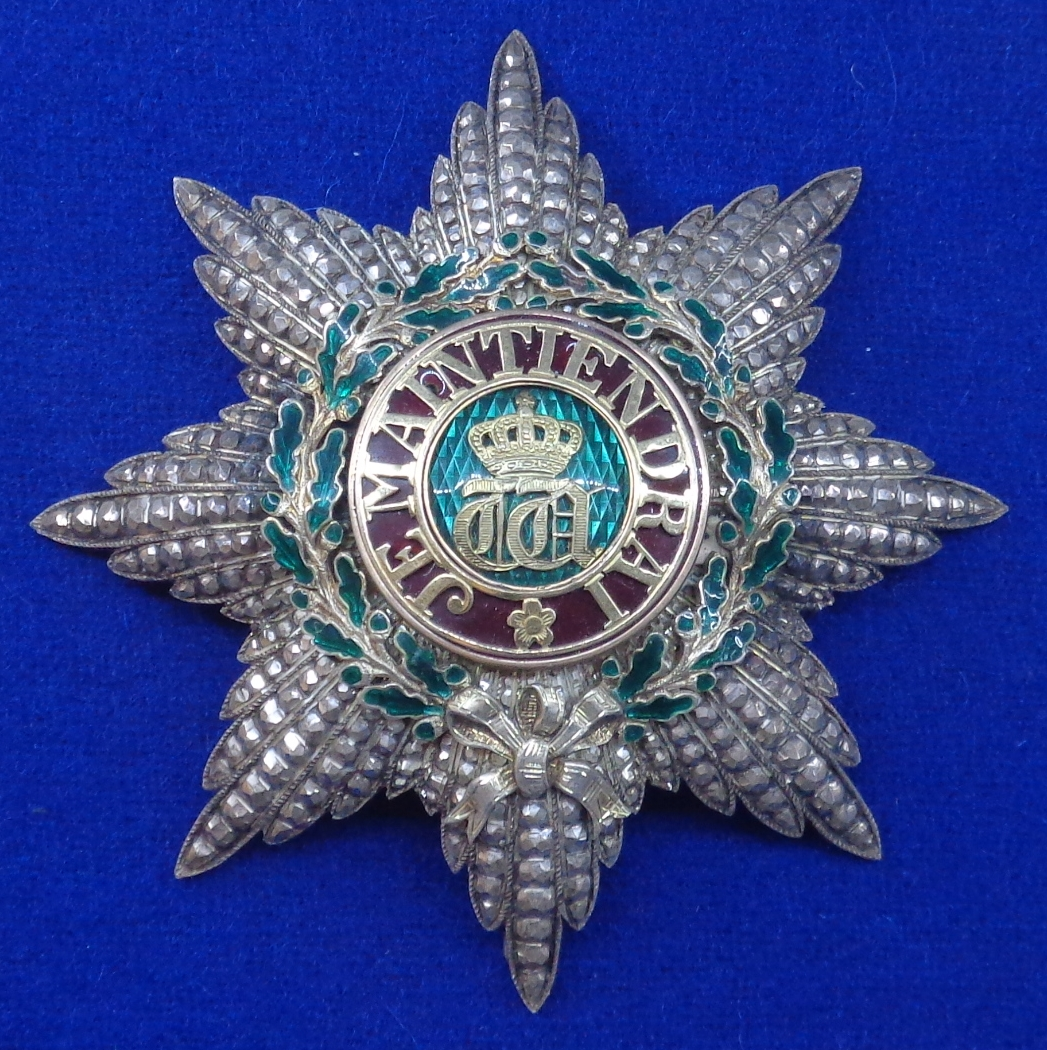
Close-up of the Grand Cross star.

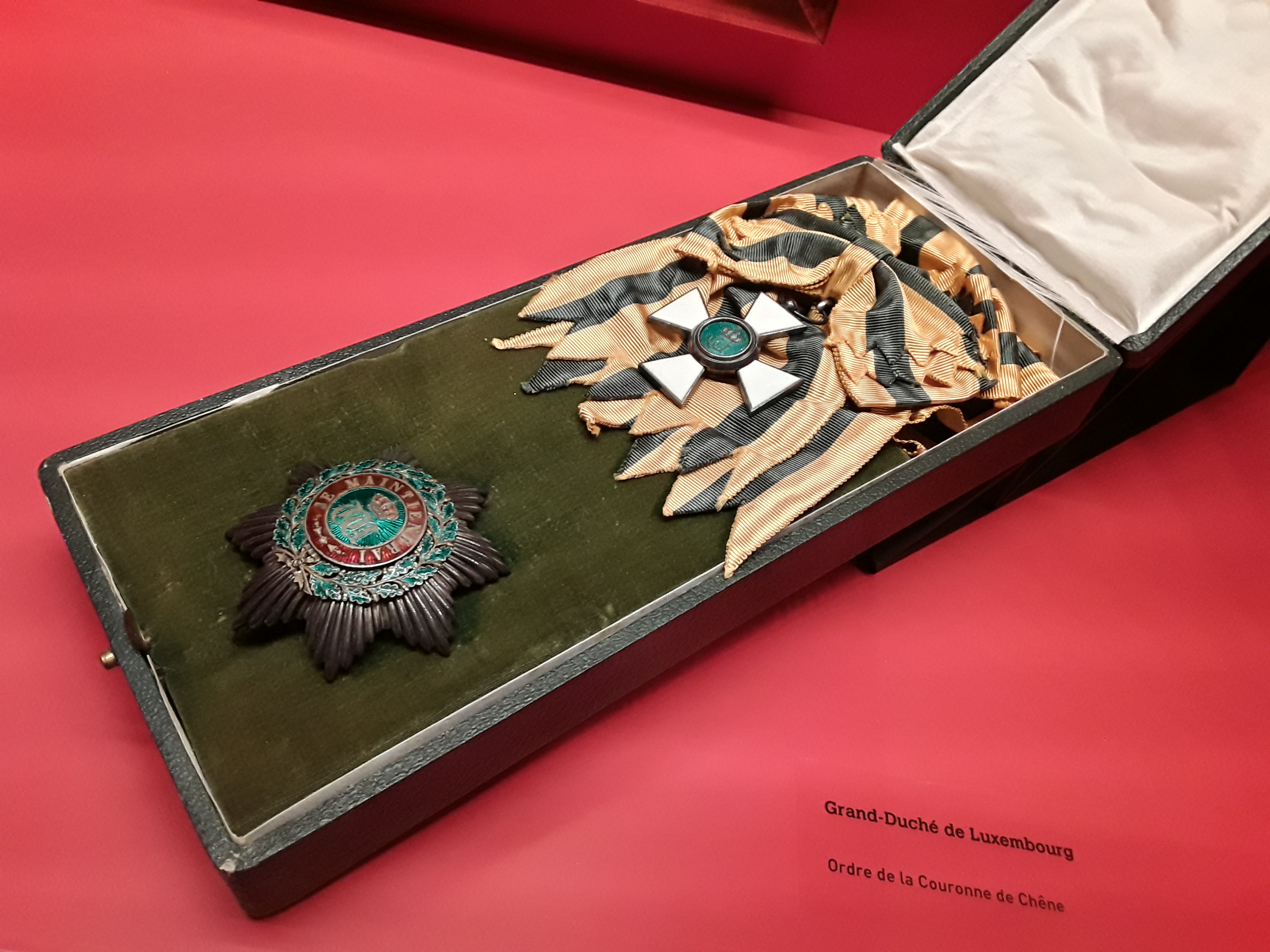
Grand Cross set from the early 20th Century

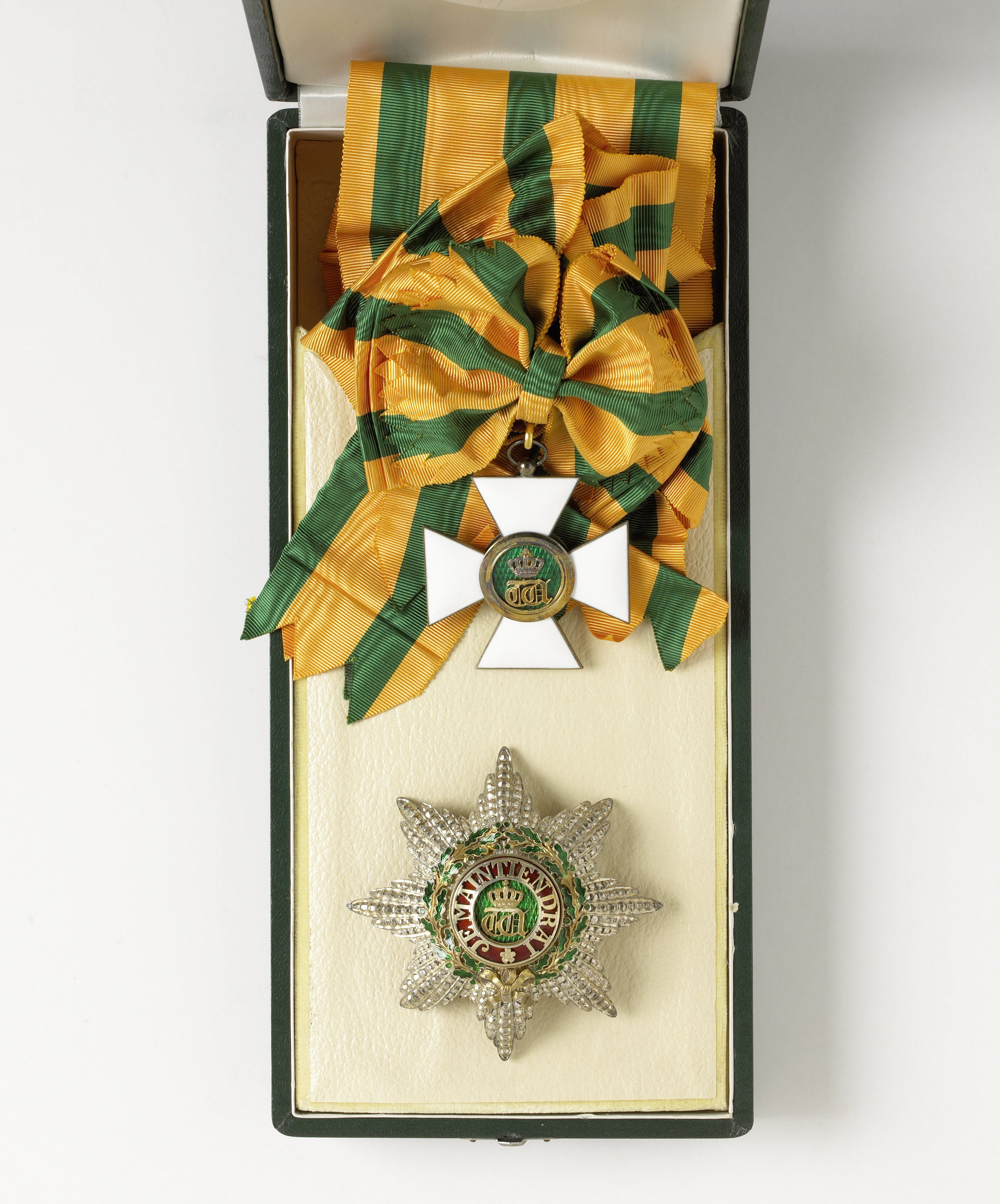
The Grand Cross set of Dutch Prime Minister Willem Drees

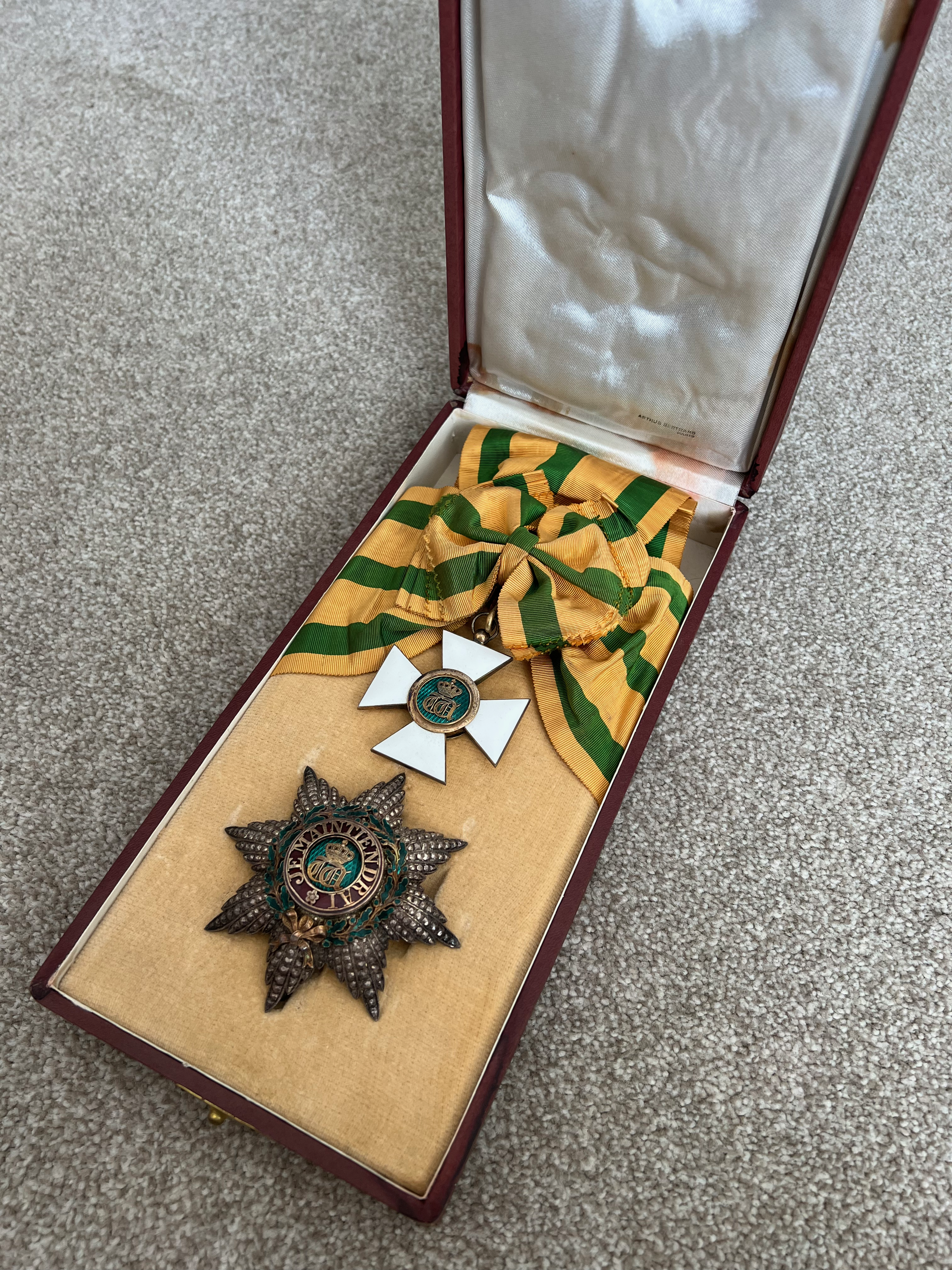
Grand Cross set by Arthus Bertrand.
