= Léon Lhoist =

Belgian businessman

Léon Lhoist was a Belgian businessman. In 1920, he married Claire Dumont, heiress of Hippolyte Dumont, industrialist in the sector of the extraction of lime and dolomite. He had three children whose Elisabeth Lhoist is the mother of Jean-Pierre Berghmans, industrialist currently at the head of Lhoist group.

== Biography ==
In 1889 Hippolyte Dumont, his father-in-law, established the Carrières et Fours à Chaux Dumont-Wautier, at Hermalle in Belgium. In 1924, Léon Lhoist founded the Etablissements Léon Lhoist, a lime and dolime (dolomitic lime, or burnt dolomite) producer, at Jemelle, Belgium. In 1926, Lhoist established the Carrières et Fours à Chaux de Dugny in France. The Lhoist group has grown becoming the leader world leader in the lime, dolime and mineral solutions.

== Sources ==
- De vijfentwintig rijkste Vlamingen: brouwers boven
- Lhoist group history
