= Marcel Fischbach =

Luxembourgish politician (1914–1980)

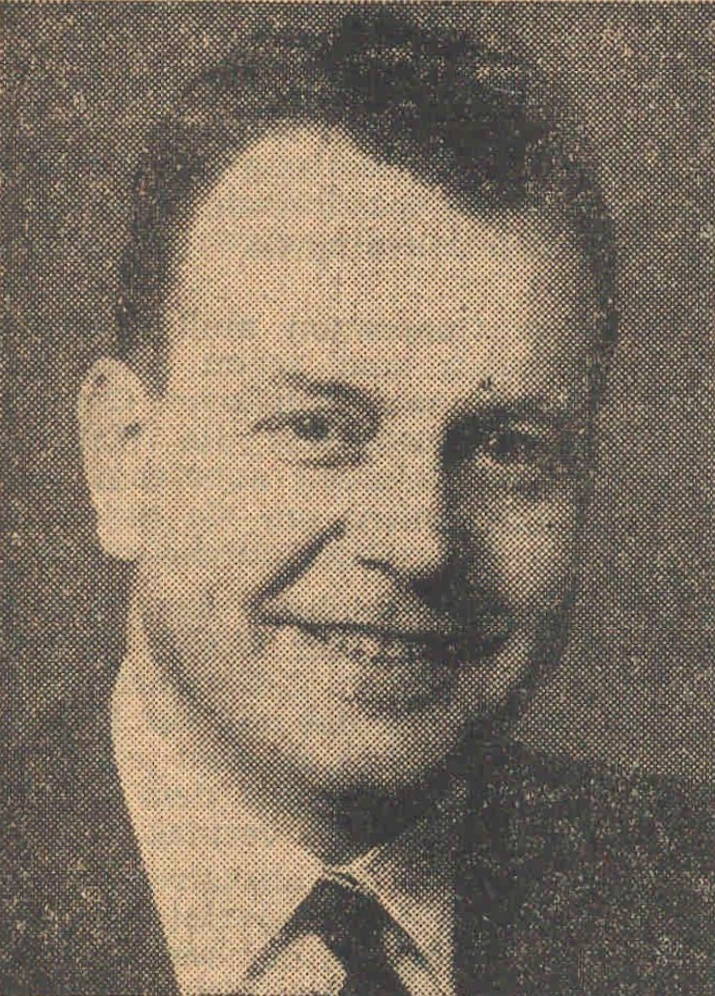
Fischbach c. 1954

Marcel Fischbach (22 August 1914 – 27 June 1980) was a Luxembourgish politician, journalist, and diplomat. He held the position of Minister for Defence in the second cabinet of Pierre Werner.

From 1939, he wrote for d'Wort, a daily newspaper. After the Second World War, Fischbach sat in both the Chamber of Deputies (1945 – 1958 and 1959 – 1964) and Luxembourg City's Luxembourg communal council (1945 – 1964). On 15 July 1964, he became Minister for Defence. During this time, Fischbach was responsible for the reduction of national service from nine months to six months. However, a political crisis erupted in late 1966 over the final transformation of the Luxembourgian army into an all-volunteer force, over which Fischbach resigned from the cabinet, and retired from politics, on 3 January 1967.

After his resignation, Fischbach became a senior diplomat, serving as Ambassador to Austria (1967 – 1973), Ambassador to Belgium (1973 – 1977), and Ambassador to Germany (1977 – 1979).

Marcel's son, Marc Fischbach, would also go on to serve as Minister for Defence (1984 – 1989).

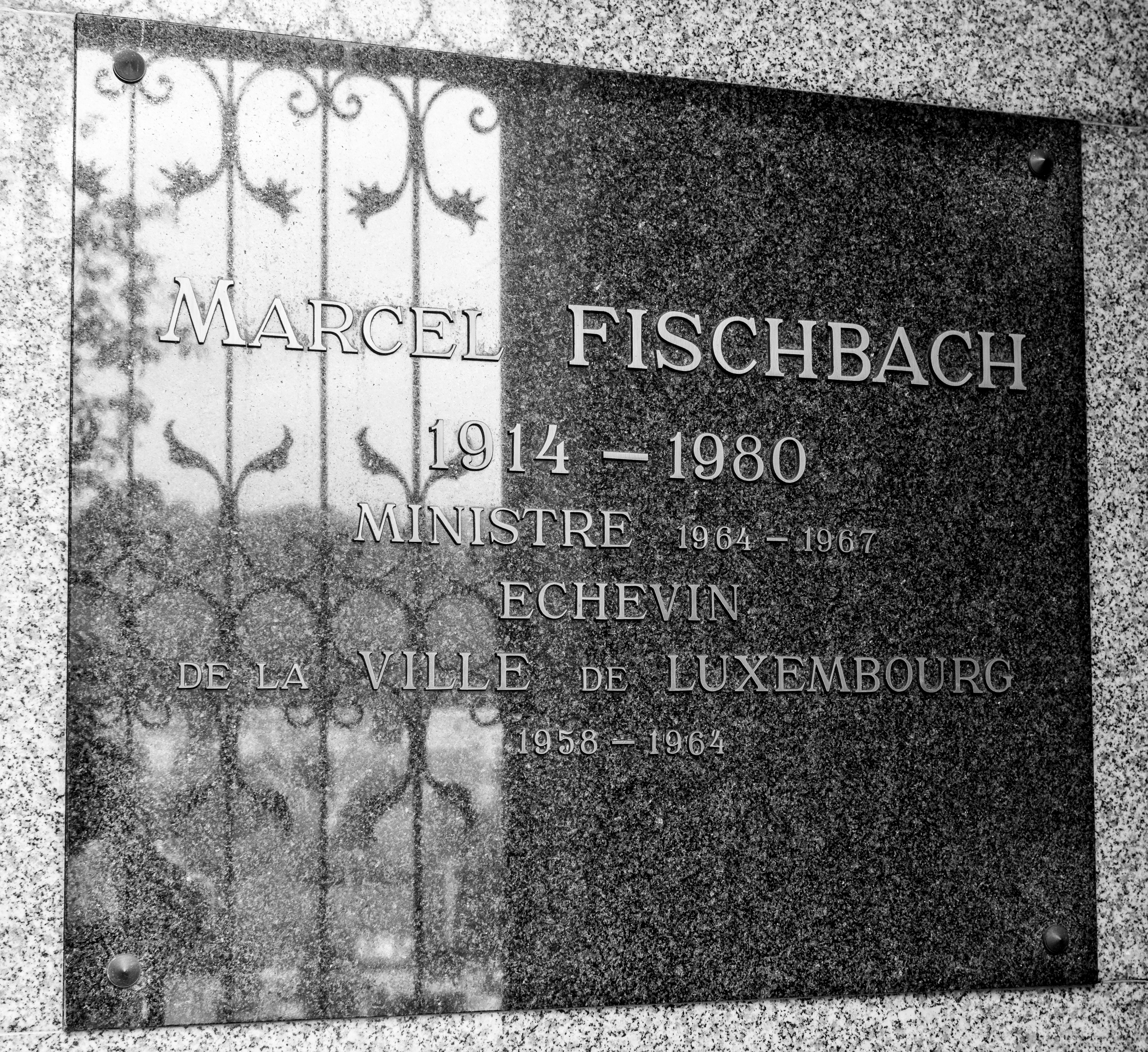
Fischbach's gravestone at Weimerskirch cemetery

Political offices
Preceded by Eugène Schaus	Minister for Defence; 1964 – 1967	Succeeded by Pierre Grégoire
Diplomatic posts
Preceded by Lambert Schaus	Permanent Representative to NATO; 1973 – 1977	Succeeded by Pierre Wurth
