= Namêche =

Namêche Nametche (Walloon)
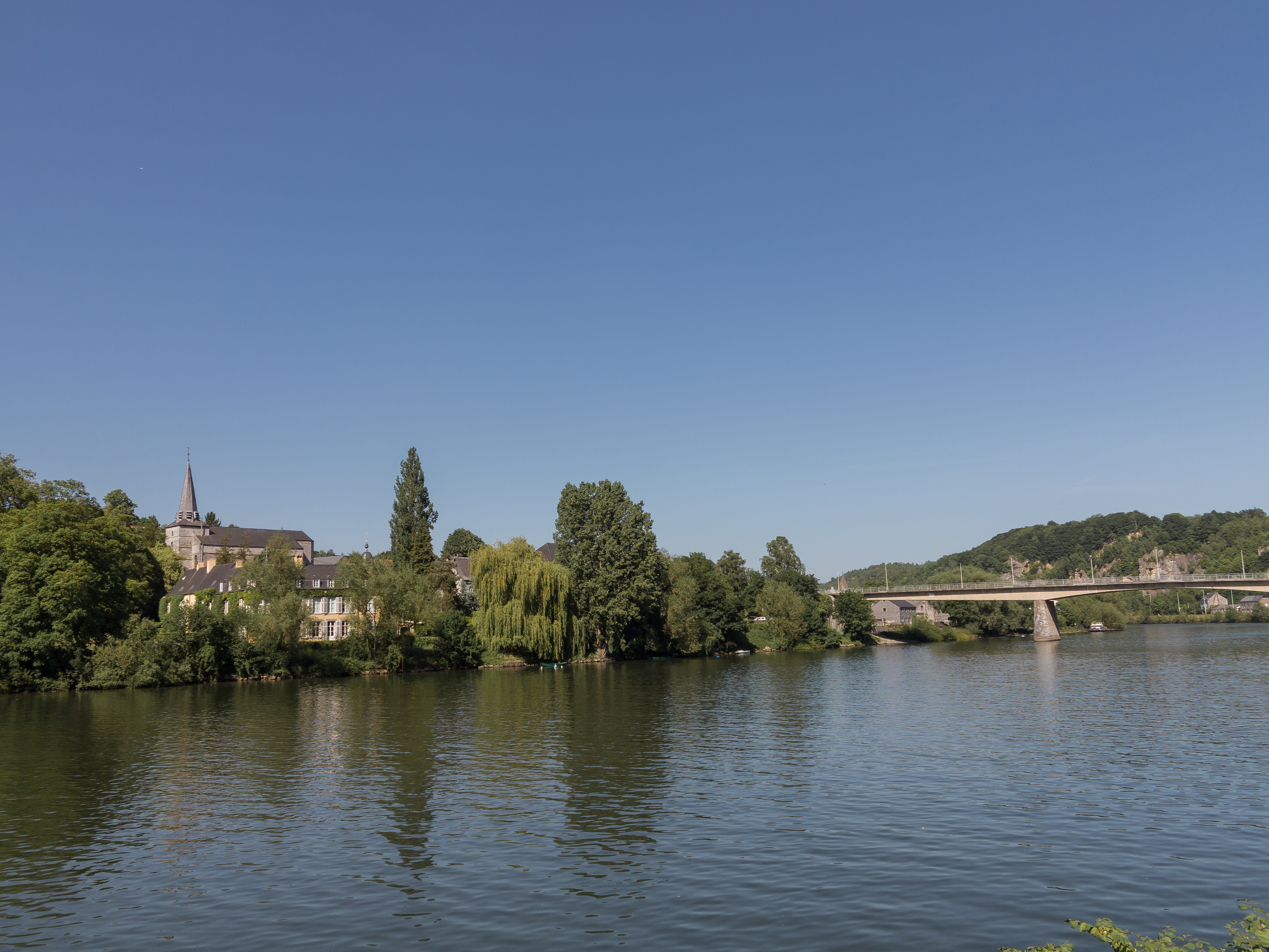
- Namêche viewed from across the Meuse

- Location within Belgium Location within Europe
- Coordinates: 50°28′N 04°59′E
- Country: Belgium
- Region: Wallonia
- Province: Namur
- Municipality: Andenne

Namêche (French pronunciation: [namɛʃ]; Walloon: Nametche) is a town in Wallonia and a district of the municipality of Andenne, located in the province of Namur, Belgium.

It is located by the river Meuse. Historically, the village was part of the County of Namur. The village church has a tower from the 16th century, while the church itself was heavily rebuilt in 1858. There are several farms from the 17th and 18th centuries preserved in the village, as well as a small château, situated in a park along next to the river.

== Notable people ==
- Jean-Pierre Berghmans (born 1949), Belgian economist and industrialist born in Namêche.
