= Lambert Schaus =

Luxembourgian politician (1908–1976)

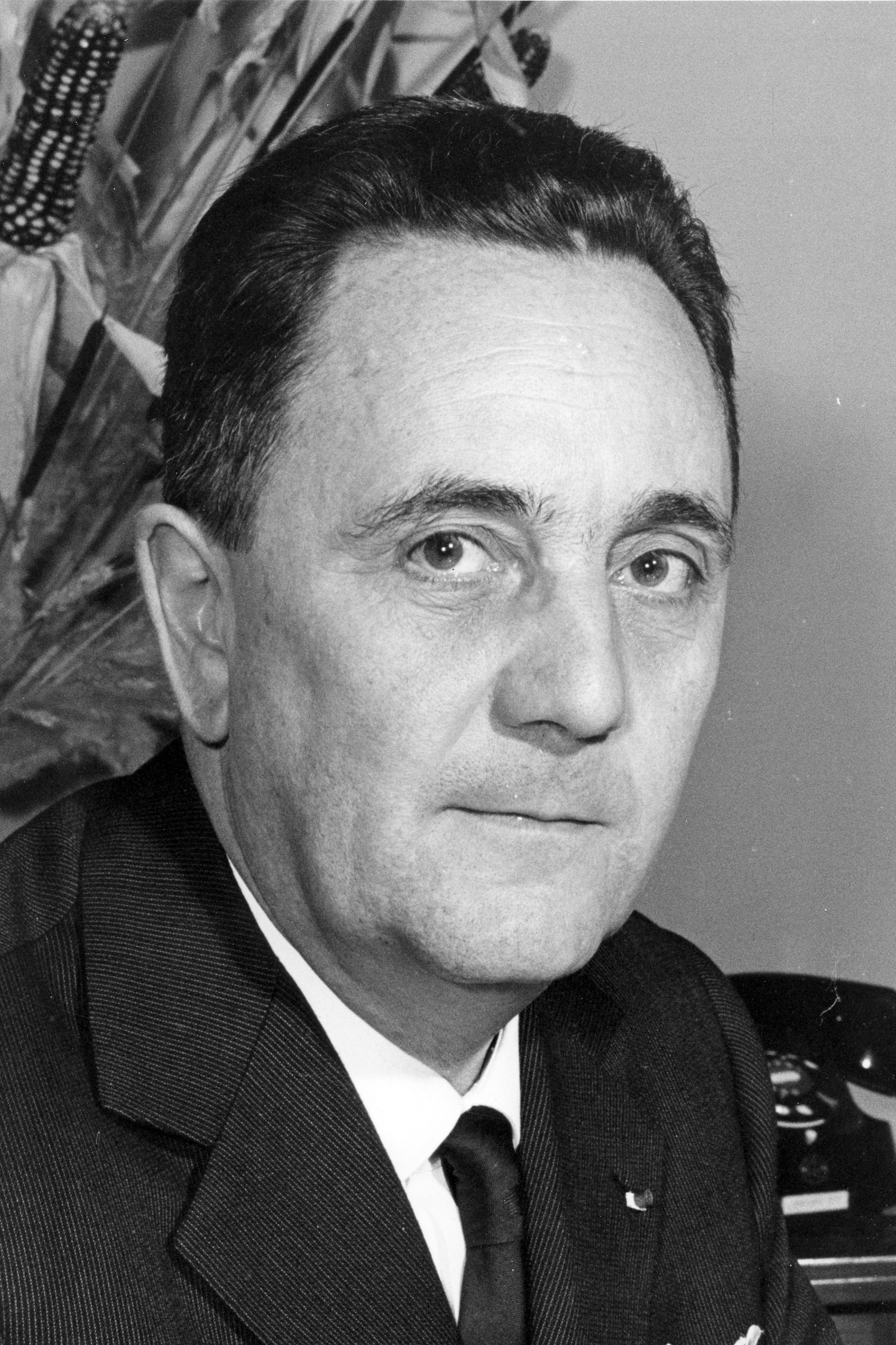
- Schaus in 1959

Ambassador to the North Atlantic Treaty Organisation
- In office 1967–1973
- Preceded by: Paul Reuter
- Succeeded by: Marcel Fischbach

European Commissioner for Transport
- In office 18 June 1958 – 2 July 1967
- President: Walter Hallstein
- Preceded by: Michel Rasquin
- Succeeded by: Victor Bodson

Minister for Defence
- In office 1 March 1947 – 14 July 1948
- Prime Minister: Pierre Dupong
- Preceded by: Pierre Dupong
- Succeeded by: Pierre Dupong

Personal details
- Born: 18 January 1908 Luxembourg, Luxembourg
- Died: 10 August 1976 (aged 68) Luxembourg, Luxembourg
- Party: Christian Social People's Party

Lambert Fernand Schaus (18 January 1908 – 10 August 1976) was a Luxembourgish politician, jurist, and diplomat. He held office as a government minister and European Commissioner.

Schaus was born in Luxembourg City to a jeweller. He studied jurisprudence in Paris, and also in Bonn for one term. In 1932, Schaus was appointed as a lawyer at the Luxembourgish court of appeal. Prior to the Second World War, Schaus was active in local politics as a Luxembourg town councillor. When Schaus refused to support the occupation of Luxembourg by Germany, he was arrested in 1941 by the Gestapo and interned in a labour camp where he worked to build motorways. Later, he was made an office assistant in the district administration office of Cochem and was later stationed in labour camps in the Sudetenland and Black Forest areas.

On returning to Luxembourg after the war, he became economy and army minister in the government of Pierre Dupong in August 1946, representing the CSV party. He was responsible for the difficult reconstruction and for the first standing army of the Grand Duchy. In July 1948, Schaus left the government and again became Luxembourg town councillor until 1952. From 1952, he became a special envoy, and from 1955, ambassador to Belgium, based in Brussels. In this role, he was significantly involved in the development of European integration and led the Luxembourg delegation negotiating the formation of the European Economic Community and Euratom.

On 18 June 1958, Schaus was appointed Luxembourg's representative on the inaugural European Commission, the Hallstein Commission, to replace the recently deceased Michel Rasquin. Schaus had responsibility for the Transport portfolio. He strove in particular for a common traffic policy among the EEC states as well as opening of the national markets for traffic and transport enterprises from other states. He was re-appointed to the second Hallstein commission in 1962 and served until 1967. He was succeeded by Victor Bodson.

Political offices
| Preceded by Pierre Dupong | Minister for Defence; 1947–1948 | Succeeded by Joseph Bech |
| Preceded by Michel Rasquin | Luxembourgish European Commissioner; 1958–1967 | Succeeded by Victor Bodson |
| Preceded by Michel Rasquin | European Commissioner for Transport; 1958–1967 | Succeeded by Victor Bodson |
Diplomatic posts
| Preceded by Paul Reuter | Ambassador to the North Atlantic Treaty Organisation; 1967–1973 | Succeeded by Marcel Fischbach |
