= Jos Chabert =

Belgian politician (1933–2014)

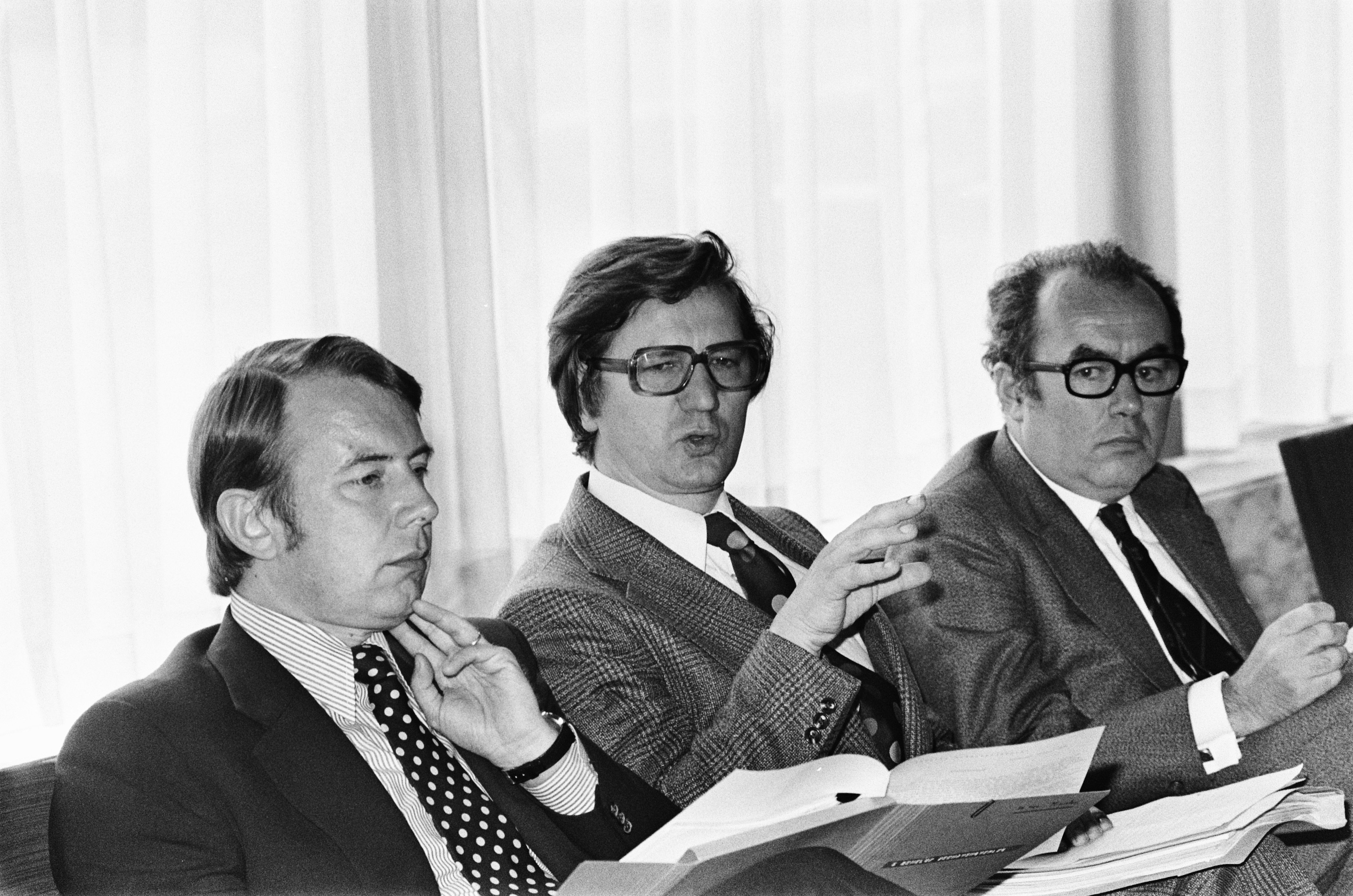
- Chabert (first from the left) in April 1975

Minister of Culture
- In office 1973–1974

Minister of Transport
- In office 1974–1980

Minister of Public Works
- In office 1980–1981

Minister of the Brussels-Capital Region
- In office 1989–2004

Personal details
- Born: March 16, 1933 Etterbeek, Belgium
- Died: April 9, 2014 (aged 81) Brussels, Belgium
- Party: CD&V
- Occupation: Politician

Jozef P. A. "Jos" Chabert (16 March 1933 – 9 April 2014) was a Belgian politician born in Etterbeek. He lived the majority of his live in Meise, Belgium. Chabert died on 9 April 2014 in Brussels.

== Political career ==
Chabert was 24 years Minister, among others, Belgian Minister of Culture, Transport and Public Works:

- 1973 – 1974 Minister of Culture
- 1974 – 1980 Minister of Transport
- 1980 – 1981 Minister of Openbare Werken

Chabert began his political career in 1965 as Alderman in Meise. He began his political career as a councillor and alderman of Meise in 1965. In 1968 he was elected Member of Parliament. In 1973 he was appointed Minister of Dutch and Flemish cultural affairs in the Belgian Government Leburton. Barely a year later he became Minister of Transport, Communications & Energy. A position he would eventually carry six years. It is in this era of policy making, Chabert realised his greatest achievements. He is the founder of the speed limit to 120 kilometres per hour, the alcohol limit to 0.8‰ and the mandatory seat belt. Afterwards he was still Deputy Prime Minister and Minister of Public Works.

From 1974, he is known for "Route Chabert" imposing flights departing from Brussels National Airport to avoid the area of Meise where he used to live. The deviation still exists, affecting the health and security of hundred of thousand of people living in Brussels.

Early 1982 Chabert disappeared from the federal government scene, looking for another challenge. He became Belgian representative at the United Nations General Assembly and later Belgian Commissioner General for World Expo in Tsukuba in Japan.

At the end of the 80s, Chabert returned to politics. He stood in the front row when the Brussels-Capital Region was held over the baptismal font. He was a long-time Minister for the Budget, Economy and Finance. In 1999 he became Minister of Public Works & Transport. Since the Christian Democrats (CD&V) at that time from the Flemish and federal government were barred due to the dioxin crisis, Chabert was for five years the only CD&V-minister in Belgium, unique.

== Honours ==
- Minister of State, by Royal Decree.
- Knight Grand Cross in the Order of the Crown.
- Grand Officer in the Order of Leopold.
- Knight Grand Cross in the Order of Merit of the Italian Republic.
- Knight Grand Cross in the Order of Merit of the Federal Republic of Germany.
- Knight Grand Cross in the Order of the Sacred Treasure.
- Grand Officer in the Order of Merit of the Grand Duchy of Luxembourg.
