= Charles d'Aspremont Lynden =

Belgian politician

Charles Albert Ferdinand Gobert, comte d'Aspremont Lynden (31 October 1888 – 21 June 1967) was a Belgian landowner, politician and cabinet minister. He was also a member of the right wing of the Catholic Party. He was the father of Harold Charles d'Aspremont Lynden, another politician and cabinet minister.

Born in Brussels, he became a doctor of law. He was elected a senator (1936-1939 and 1946-1961) and a representative (1939-1946) for the arrondissement of Dinant-Philippeville. He served as Minister for Agriculture (1939-1940) and Minister Without Portfolio (1940-1944), both in the Belgian Government in Exile. He died in Natoye.
