= Dual accreditation =

Diplomat with two responsibilities

Dual accreditation is the practice in diplomacy of a country granting two separate responsibilities to a single diplomat. One prominent form of dual accreditation is for a diplomat to serve as the ambassador to two countries concurrently. For example, Luxembourg's ambassador to the United States is also its non-resident ambassador to Mexico and Nicaragua. Such an ambassador may sometimes be called Ambassador-at-Large.

The Holy See refuses to accept dual accreditation with Italy, an assertion of sovereignty dating from the prisoner-in-the-Vatican dispute. For example, when Ireland closed its embassy to the Holy See in Rome, accreditation as Irish ambassador to the Holy See was given to a diplomat based at the Department of Foreign Affairs in Dublin rather than to the Irish ambassador to Italy.

According to the 2021 US State Department Office of Foreign Missions' Accreditation Handbook, "Separately, the Department may consider the dual accreditation of an individual performing administrative functions and duties only, e.g., a consular employee, who performs administrative duties or submits eGov transactions in connection with his/her government’s representation to the UN."

In other foreign services, such as that of the Philippines, an Ambassador may be appointed in a non-resident capacity to more than one country apart from where he serves as resident ambassador, making the qualifier "dual" inapplicable. In Philippine diplomatic practice, the term "concurrent jurisdiction" is more often used.

== See also ==
- Letter of credence
- Protecting power, a third country representing the interests of a country in another country with which it does not have diplomatic relations
