= Alphonse Berns =

Luxembourgish diplomat

Alphonse Berns (born April 9, 1952) is a senior Luxembourgish diplomat in the rank of Ambassador extraordinary and plenipotentiary. He has served as his country's Ambassador in Washington, DC, London, Brussels, to NATO as well as to the UN and WTO in Geneva. Currently he holds the position of Director General for Fiscal Policy in the Ministry of Finance in Luxembourg.

Berns holds a degree in international and EU law from the University of Aix-en-Provence, France, and is an alumnus of the Center for European Studies in Nancy, France.

In 1977, Berns entered the Luxembourg diplomatic service. In 1978 he became a non-resident member of his country's permanent representation to the Council of Europe. From 1979 to 1986 he served as Deputy Permanent Representative to NATO in Brussels. Upon return to Luxembourg, he was mandated to develop and run a new Budget and Administration Department at the Ministry of Foreign Affairs.

In 1989 he became the Director for EU and international economic relations, foreign trade as well as development cooperation. In this function he served i.a. as Luxembourg's negotiator for the Schengen Agreement and as chief negotiator for civil aviation agreements. In 1991, Berns was promoted to the post of Ambassador to the United States of America, also accredited to Canada and Mexico.

Between 1998 and 2002 he held the top diplomatic civil servant job as Secretary General of the Ministry of Foreign Affairs, Foreign Trade and Development Cooperation. In 1999 he also became Secretary General of the Ministry of Defense. In 2002, Berns moved to Geneva as Permanent Representative to the UN and the WTO.

In 2005, he became Ambassador to Belgium and Permanent Representative to NATO in Brussels. In autumn 2011, Berns was named Ambassador to the Court of St. James's in London, also accredited to Ireland and Iceland.

Between 1989 and 1991, Berns served on a number of boards in Luxembourg, among them the national credit and investment bank SNCI and the national air-carrier, Luxair. He currently is a member of the board of Cargolux, the national freight carrier.

== Notes ==
Berns was appointed as an Administrateur of The Luxembourg Freeport Management Company SA (LFMC) on May 19, 2015. LFMC operates the Luxembourg Freeport at Luxembourg Findel Airport. The project was majority funded by Swiss businessman and art dealer Yves Bouvier of Natural Le Coultre SA.
