= Foreign policy of the Bush administration =

Foreign policy of the Bush administration may refer to:

- Foreign policy of the George H. W. Bush administration, the foreign policy of the United States from 1989 to 1993
- Foreign policy of the George W. Bush administration, the foreign policy of the United States from 2001 to 2009
