= Inga Rhonda King =

Saint Vincent and the Grenadines accountant, teacher

Her Excellency Inga Rhonda King
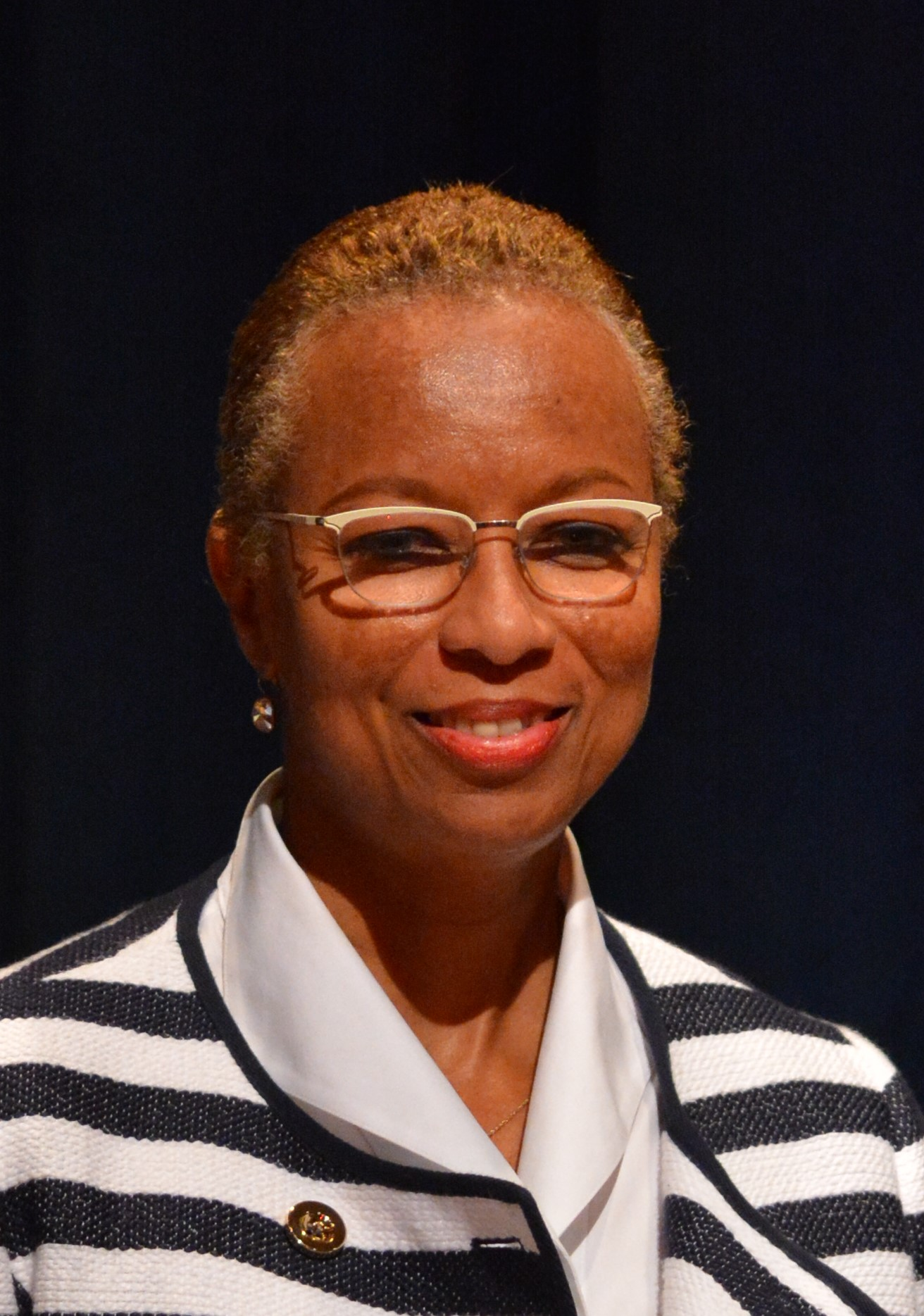
- King in 2014

Permanent Representative of Saint Vincent and the Grenadines to the United Nations
- Incumbent
- Assumed office 13 September 2013
- Prime Minister: Ralph Gonsalves

74th [[President of the United Nations Economic and Social Council]]
- In office 26 July 2018 – 25 July 2019
- Preceded by: Marie Chatardová
- Succeeded by: Mona Juul

Personal details
- Born: Kingston, West Indies Federation

Inga Rhonda King (also known as I. Rhonda King) is a Saint Vincent and the Grenadines accountant, teacher, and publisher. She has served as the country's Permanent Representative to the United Nations (UN) since September 2013.

== Early life and education ==
Inga Rhonda King was born in Curaçao, Netherlands Antilles and is Vincentian by descent.

She has a bachelor's of science degree in chemistry and mathematics from the State University of New York at Albany.

== Career ==
King is a certified accountant and financial manager. She has also worked in publishing, business development, and academia. She taught English as a foreign language in China from 2002 to 2003 and has been a volunteer mathematics teacher for at-risk children in Miami.

In 2003, King published her biography as a collection of essays called Journal of a Superfluous Woman in which she narrates her experience with breast cancer.

In 2006, King founded Strategy Forum Inc, an independent publisher of illustrated books. She is also an artist.

From 2010, King was Chairperson of National Investment Promotions in Kingstown. She was also appointed honorary consul for Portugal. In 2011, she became chair of St Vincent and the Grenadines' investment promotion agency.

King was appointed as Permanent Representative to the United Nations by Prime Minister Ralph Gonsalves on 13 September 2013, presenting her credentials to presented her credentials to UN Secretary-General Ban Ki-moon. In January 2016, St Vincent and the Grenadines voting rights at the UN were suspended due to outstanding payment of dues. King said it was a clerical error which would be fixed promptly.

On 29 September 2016, King was elected chair of the UN Fifth Committee (Administrative and Budgetary). On 27 April 2017, she spoke at the General Assembly to champion the resolution to include World Creativity and Innovation Day on the UN Days of Observance. King has also served as Chair of the UN L.69 Group of Developing Countries.

On 26 July 2018, King was elected to be the 74th President of the UN Economic and Social Council. She was succeeded by Mona Juul of Norway.

In 2019, King led the delegation of Saint Vincent and the Grenadines to the countries UN Security Council seat.

On 22 January 2021, King signed and ratified the Treaty on the Prohibition of Nuclear Weapons (TPNW) as representative of Saint Vincent and the Grenadines.

On 20 January 2025, King was appointed, alongside Jakub Kulhánek, Permanent Representative of Czechia to the United Nations, as co-facilitator in the United Nations Economic and Social Council and High-Level Political Forum.

== Recognition and awards ==
On 23 October 2019, King was awarded the 2019 Spirit of the UN Award, becoming the first Caribbean Community (CARICOM) Permanent Representative to receive the honour.

== Publications ==
- King, Inga Rhonda (2003). Journal of a Superfluous Woman: A Collection of Essays. iUniverse. ISBN 9780595295531.
- King, Inga Rhonda (2009). Caribbean Sense of Life: A Photographic Narrative. Strategy Forum Inc.
- King, Inga Rhonda (2011). The Green Legacy of Saint Vincent and the Grenadines. Strategy Forum Inc. ISBN 978-0-9824215-2-9.
- King, Inga Rhonda (2011). A Tiny Slice of Caribbean Life: Portrait of a Vincy Woman. Strategy Forum In.
- King, I. Rhonda (30 November 2015). "The Green Legacy of Saint Vincent and the Grenadines". Huffington Post.
