= President of the United Nations =

There are several positions within the United Nations that have the title President:

- President of the United Nations General Assembly
- President of the United Nations Security Council
- President of the United Nations Economic and Social Council
