= Oh Joon =

South Korean ambassador to the United Nations

His Excellency Oh Joon
- 오준

President of the United Nations Economic and Social Council
- In office 24 July 2015 – 28 July 2016
- Secretary-General: Ban Ki-moon
- Preceded by: Martin Sadjik
- Succeeded by: Frederick Musiiwa Makamure Shava

South Korean Ambassador to the United Nations
- In office 20 September 2013 – 30 December 2016
- President: Park Geun-hye; Hwang Kyo-ahn (Acting)
- Secretary-General: Ban Ki-moon
- Succeeded by: Cho Tae-yul

South Korean Ambassador to Singapore
- In office 2010–2013
- President: Lee Myung-bak; Park Geun-hye

Personal details
- Born: 4 October 1955 (age 70) Seoul, Republic of Korea
- Spouse: Kim Miri Department of United Nations and the Art of Peace Professor
- Education: Seoul National University (1974–1978); London School of Economics and Political Science (1982–1983); Stanford University (1990–1992)

Oh Joon (Korean: 오준; Hanja: 吳俊; born 4 October 1955) is the former South Korean Ambassador to the United Nations (UN). He became South Korean Ambassador to the United Nations in September 2013. From July 24, 2015 to July 28, 2016, he was the 71st President of the UN Economic and Social Council.

In 2016, Oh was appointed by Erik Solheim, the Chairman of the Development Assistance Committee, to serve on the High Level Panel on the Future of the Development Assistance Committee under the leadership of Mary Robinson.
