= Lachezara Stoeva =

Bulgarian diplomat

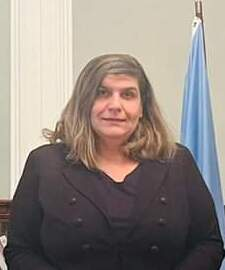
Lachezara Stoeva

Lachezara Stoeva (Bulgarian: Лъчезара Стоева; born 1977) is a Bulgarian diplomat that served as Permanent Representative of Bulgaria to the United Nations from 2021 to 2025. She was the seventy-ninth President of the United Nations Economic and Social Council from 2022 to 2023.

== Biography ==
Stoeva studied political science at Sofia University and European politics and government at the London School of Economics, obtaining Master's degrees from both institutions.

Stoeva joined the Ministry of Foreign Affairs of Bulgaria in 2002, heading its Department of International Development Cooperation from 2012 to 2013 and its Department of Arms Control and Non-Proliferation from 2013 to 2014.

Stoeva served as Deputy Permanent Representative of Bulgaria to the United Nations from 2016 to 2019 (having previously been acting Deputy) before directing the Department of Economic, Financial and Administrative Affairs of the United Nations in the Ministry of Foreign Affairs.

In 2021 Stoeva was appointed Permanent Representative to the United Nations, and in 2022 was elected to serve for a one-year term as President of the United Nations Economic and Social Council.

Diplomatic posts
Preceded by Georgi Panayotov	Permanent Representative of Bulgaria to the United Nations; 2021–2025	Succeeded by Gergana Karadzhova
