= Foreign policy of the George H. W. Bush administration =

Foreign policy of the United States from January 1989 to January 1993

George H. W. Bush, whose term as president lasted from 1989 until 1993, had extensive experience with the United States foreign policy. Unlike his predecessor, Ronald Reagan, he downplayed vision and emphasized caution and careful management. He had quietly disagreed with many of Reagan's foreign policy decisions and tried to build his own policies. His main foreign policy advisors were Secretaries of State James Baker, a longtime friend, and National Security Advisor Brent Scowcroft. Key geopolitical events that occurred during Bush's presidency were:

- The Gulf War, in which Bush led a large coalition that defeated Iraq following its Invasion of Kuwait, but allowed Saddam Hussein to remain in power.
- The United States invasion of Panama to overthrow a local dictator.
- The signing of the START I (with the Soviet Union) and START II (with Russia) treaties for nuclear disarmament.
- Revolutions of 1989 and the collapse of Moscow-oriented Communism, especially in Eastern Europe.
- The end of the Cold War and the dissolution of the Soviet Union in 1991, replaced by the Post-Soviet states (Russia and 14 other countries).
- German reunification in 1990, with the democratic West Germany absorbing the ex-Communist East Germany.
- The expansion of NATO to the east, starting with a united Germany.

== Appointments ==
Bush's 1989 foreign policy team

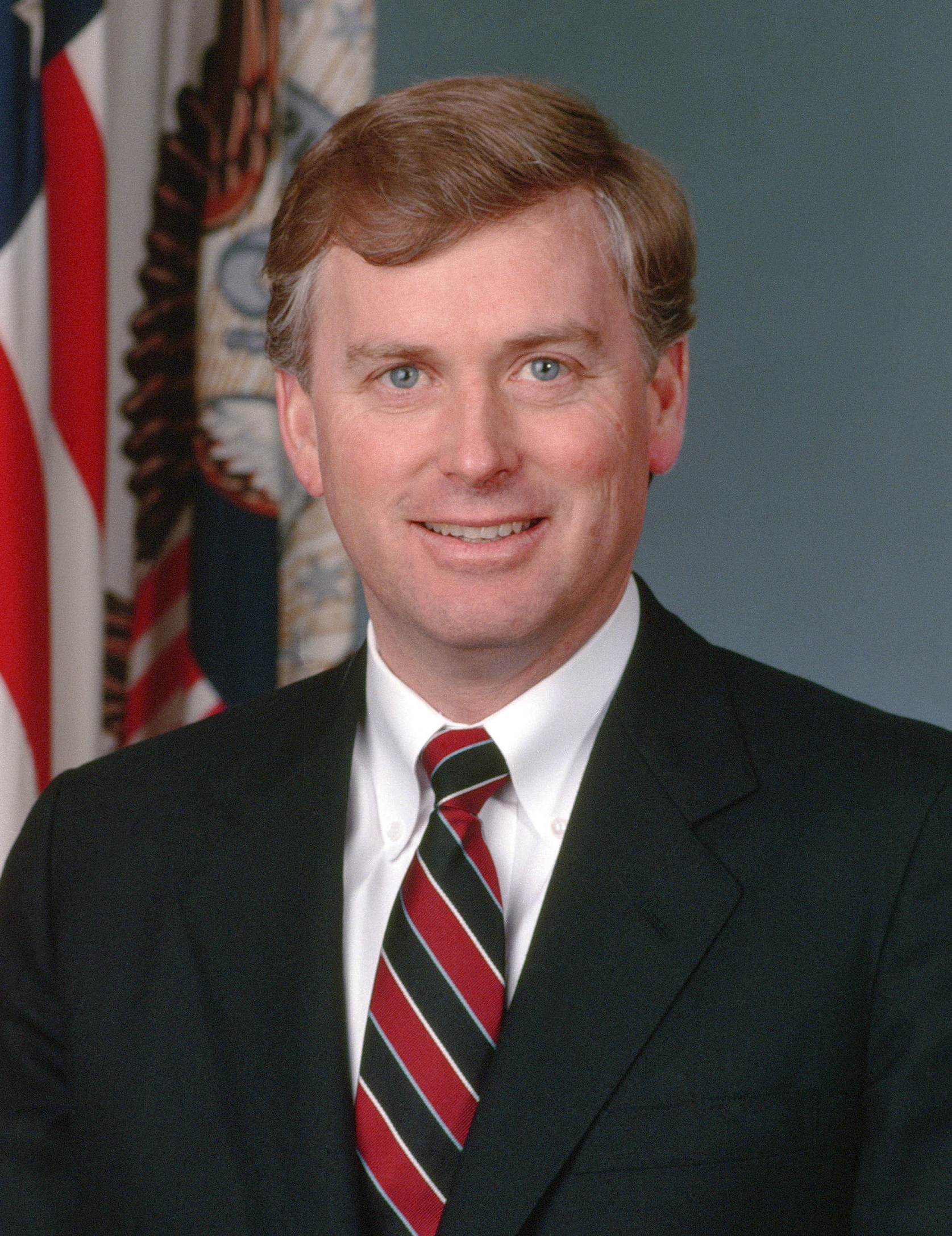
Dan Quayle

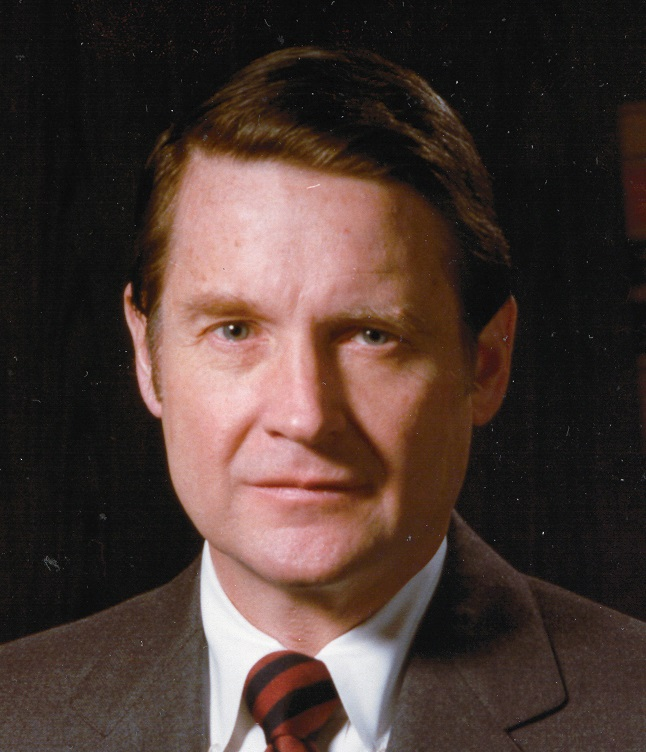
William H. Webster

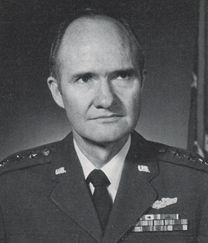
Brent Scowcroft

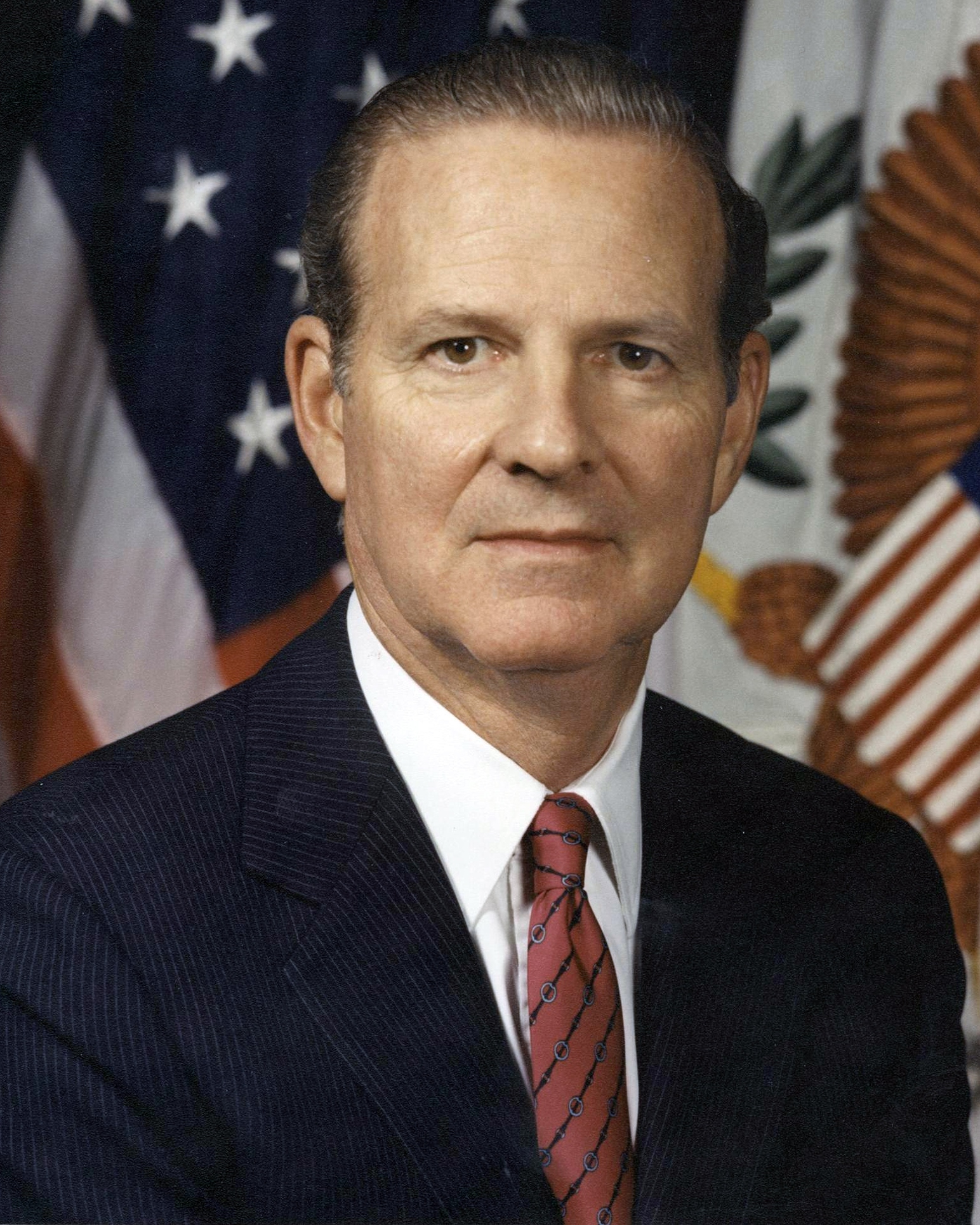
James Baker

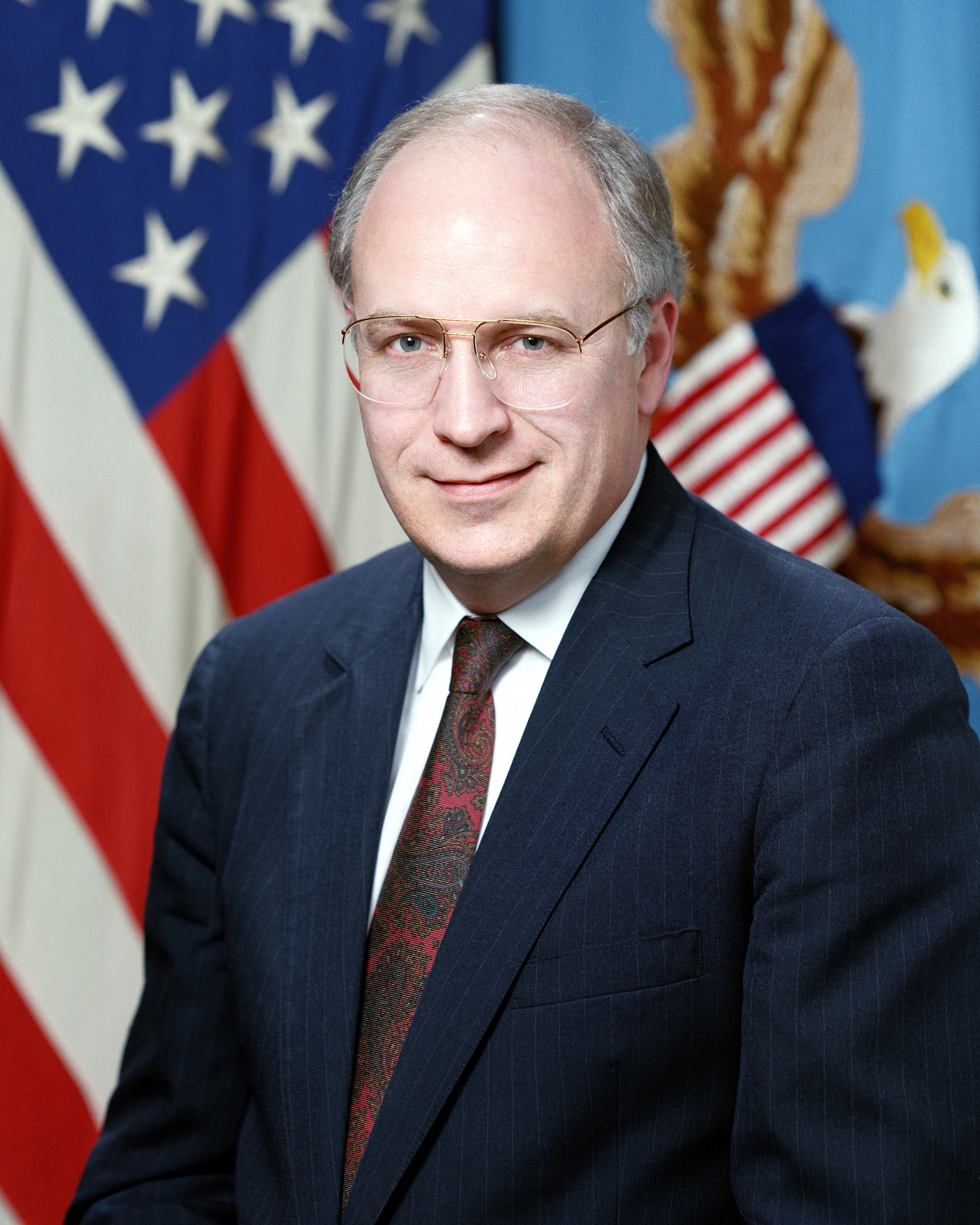
Dick Cheney

George H. W. Bush administration foreign policy personnel
| Vice President | Quayle (1989–1993) | | |
| Secretary of State | Baker (1989–1992) | | Eagleburger (1992–1993) |
| Secretary of Defense | Cheney (1989–1993) | | |
| Ambassador to the United Nations | Walters (1989) | Pickering (1989–1992) | Perkins (1992–1993) |
| Director of Central Intelligence | Webster (1989–1991) | Kerr (1991) | Gates (1991–1993) |
| Assistant to the President for National Security Affairs | Scowcroft (1989–1993) | | |
| Deputy Assistant to the President for National Security Affairs | Gates (1989–1991) | | Howe (1991–1993) |
| Trade Representative | Hills (1989–1993) | | |

== History ==
=== Experienced leadership team ===
In 1971, President Richard Nixon appointed Bush as Ambassador to the United Nations, and he became chairman of the Republican National Committee in 1973. In 1974, President Gerald Ford appointed him Chief of the Liaison Office in China and later made him the Director of Central Intelligence. Bush sought the Republican presidential nomination in 1980, but lost to Ronald Reagan. He was then elected vice president in 1980 and 1984 as Reagan's running mate. The vice president, logged 1.3 million miles of travel to 50 states and 65 foreign countries, handling numerous diplomatic roles.

Bush was a longtime close friend of both his top advisers, Secretaries of State James Baker and National Security Advisor Brent Scowcroft. Baker dealt with tactical and managerial issues of the State Department and foreign policy, while Scowcroft was concerned with long-term strategy. Lawrence Eagleburger was the number two in the State Department. Robert Gates, an intelligence expert, was deputy to Scowcroft, And had a major policy-making role. The full National Security Council met three times a week. Vice President Dan Quayle handled ceremonial foreign-policy visits. Bush wanted to name Senator John Tower as secretary of defense, but Tower's colleagues in the Senate were annoyed at his imperious style and drinking problem. They rejected the nomination, so Defense went to Congressman Dick Cheney. Colin Powell, more moderate than the others, became the powerful Chairman of the Joint Chiefs.

=== Initial themes ===
In his inaugural address, Bush called on bipartisanship in foreign policy to begin anew. Addressing the world, he offered a "new engagement and a renewed vow: We will stay strong to protect the peace." He mentioned Americans in other countries and the lack of knowledge on their whereabouts: "There are today Americans who are held against their will in foreign lands and Americans who are unaccounted for. Assistance can be shown here and will be long remembered. Good will begets good will. Good faith can be a spiral that endlessly moves on." Bush stated the administration's intent to retain alliances from prior administrations while "we will continue the new closeness with the Soviet Union, consistent both with our security and with progress."

A week into the administration, Bush was asked in what region he wished to move forward. He responded by saying "All of them", furthering there were "plenty of troublespots" and specifying Central America as one of them while insisting there needed to be complete reviews for major initiatives to take place and a bilaterally supported policy in Central America would take more time to develop.

By the end of his first year in office, Bush had traveled to fifteen countries, at the time tying him with Gerald Ford as the most traveled first year president. This record was broken in 2009 by sixteen trips of Barack Obama.

=== Victory in the Cold War ===
==== Fall of the Soviet control in Eastern Europe ====
Map showing the division of East and West Germany until 1990, with West Berlin in yellow

Reagan and Soviet General Secretary Mikhail Gorbachev had largely ended Cold War tensions in the late 1980s. However Bush remained skeptical of Soviet intentions. During the first year of his tenure, Bush pursued what Soviets referred to as the pauza, a break in Reagan's détente policies. While Bush implemented his pauza policy in 1989, Soviet satellites in Eastern Europe challenged Soviet domination. Bush helped convince Polish United Workers' Party leaders to allow democratic elections in June, won by the anti-Communists. In 1989, Communist governments fell in all the satellites, with significant violence only in Romania. In November 1989, massive popular demand forced the Communist government of East Germany to open the Berlin Wall, and it was soon demolished by gleeful Berliners. Gorbachev refused to send in the Soviet military, effectively abandoning the Brezhnev Doctrine. Within a few weeks Communist regimes across Eastern Europe collapsed, and Soviet supported parties across the globe became demoralized. The U.S. was not directly involved in these upheavals, but the Bush administration avoided the appearance of gloating over the NATO victory to avoid undermining further democratic reforms especially in the USSR.

Bush and Gorbachev met in December 1989 in summit on the island of Malta. Bush sought cooperative relations with Gorbachev throughout the remainder of his term, putting his trust in Gorbachev to suppress the remaining Soviet hard-liners. The key issue at the Malta Summit was the potential reunification of Germany. While Britain and France were wary of a re-unified Germany, Bush pushed for German reunification alongside West German chancellor Helmut Kohl. Gorbachev resisted the idea of a reunified Germany, especially if it became part of NATO, but the upheavals of the previous year had sapped his power at home and abroad. Gorbachev agreed to hold "Two-Plus-Four" talks among the U.S., the Soviet Union, France, Britain, West Germany, and East Germany, which commenced in 1990. After extensive negotiations, Gorbachev eventually agreed to allow a reunified Germany to be a part of NATO. He did not get Washington's agreement that NATO would not expand into the new eastern European countries of the former Warsaw Pact. With the signing of the Treaty on the Final Settlement with Respect to Germany, Germany officially reunified in October 1990.

==== Dissolution of the Soviet Union ====
The Soviet Union dissolved into fifteen independent republics in 1991; Russia is in red.

While Gorbachev acquiesced to loss of control over the Soviet satellite states, he suppressed nationalist movements within the Soviet Union itself. Stalin had occupied and annexed the Baltic states of Lithuania, Latvia, and Estonia in the 1940s. The old leadership was executed or deported or fled; hundreds of thousands of Russians moved in, but nowhere were they a majority. Hatreds simmered. Lithuania's March 1990 proclamation of independence was strongly opposed by Gorbachev, who feared that the Soviet Union could fall apart if he allowed Lithuania's independence. The United States had never recognized the Soviet incorporation of the Baltic states, and the crisis in Lithuania left Bush in a difficult position. Bush needed Gorbachev's cooperation in the reunification of Germany, and he feared that the collapse of the Soviet Union could leave nuclear arms in dangerous hands. The Bush administration mildly protested Gorbachev's suppression of Lithuania's independence movement, but took no action to directly intervene. Bush warned independence movements of the disorder that could come with secession from the Soviet Union; in a 1991 address that critics labeled the "Chicken Kiev speech", he cautioned against "suicidal nationalism".

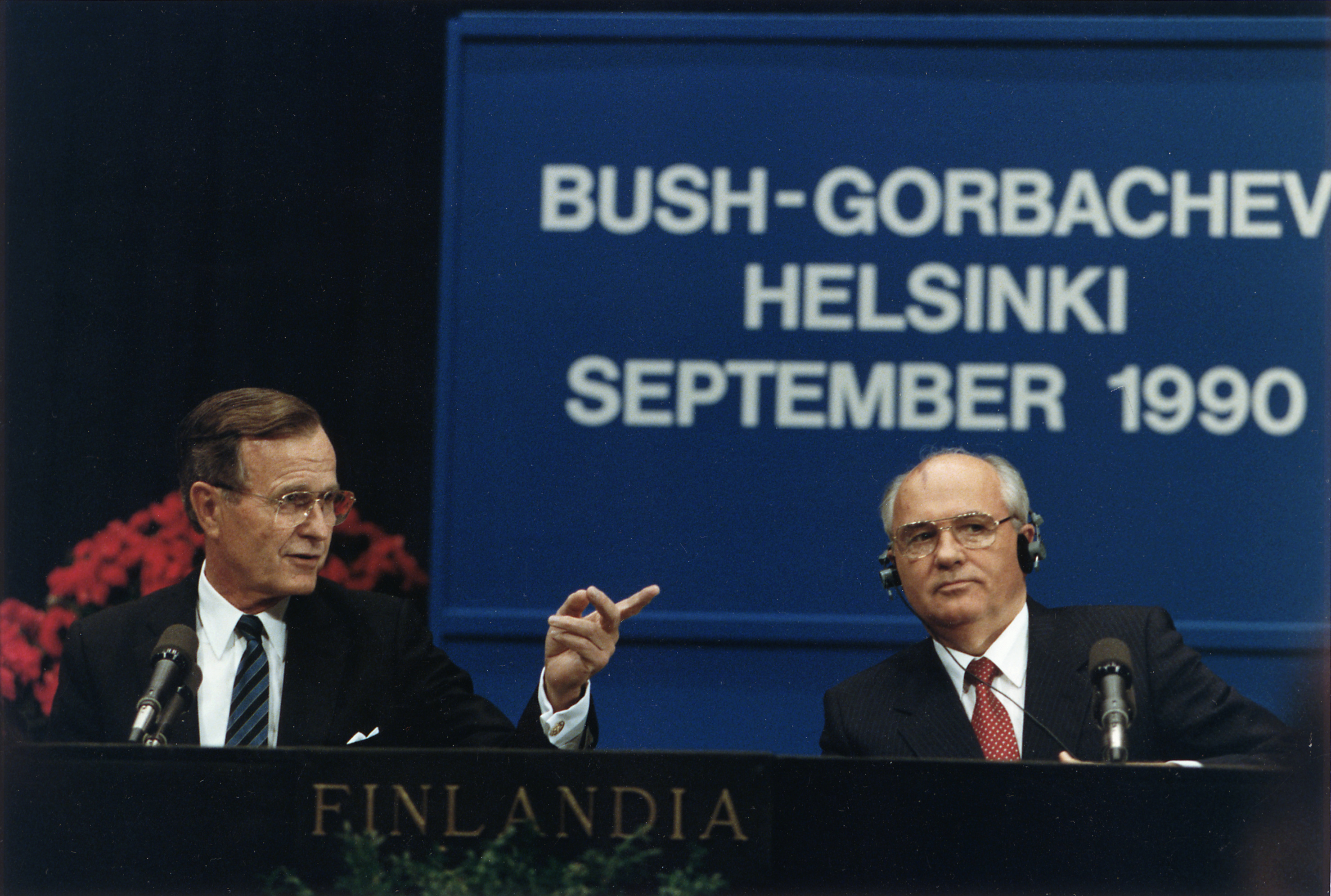
Bush and Gorbachev at the Helsinki Summit in 1990

In July 1991, Bush and Gorbachev signed the Strategic Arms Reduction Treaty (START I) treaty, the first major arms agreement since the 1987 Intermediate Ranged Nuclear Forces Treaty. Both countries agreed to cut their strategic nuclear weapons by 30 percent, and the Soviet Union promised to reduce its intercontinental ballistic missile force by 50 percent. In August 1991, hard-line Communists launched a coup against Gorbachev; while the coup quickly fell apart, it broke the remaining power of Gorbachev and the central Soviet government. Later that month, Gorbachev resigned as general secretary of the Communist party, and Russian president Boris Yeltsin ordered the seizure of Soviet property. Gorbachev clung to power as the president of the Soviet Union, until 25 December 1991, when the Soviet Union dissolved. Fifteen states emerged from the Soviet Union, and of those states, Russia was the largest and most populous. Bush and Yeltsin met in February 1992, declaring a new era of "friendship and partnership". In January 1993, Bush and Yeltsin agreed to START II, which provided for further nuclear arms reductions on top of the original START treaty.

== Americas ==
=== Argentina ===
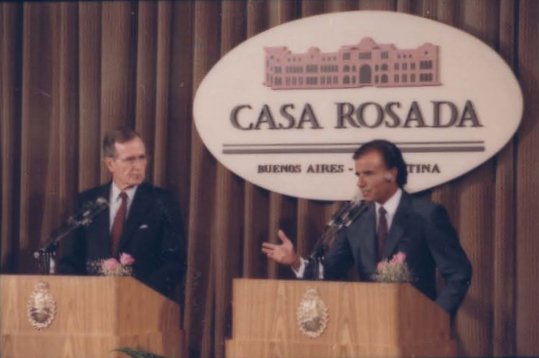
Bush and President Carlos Menem at Casa Rosada

Argentina wanted very good relations with the United States, as it moved toward more economic liberalism, and agreed with Washington's priorities regarding cooperative security, peacekeeping, and drug control.

=== Canada ===
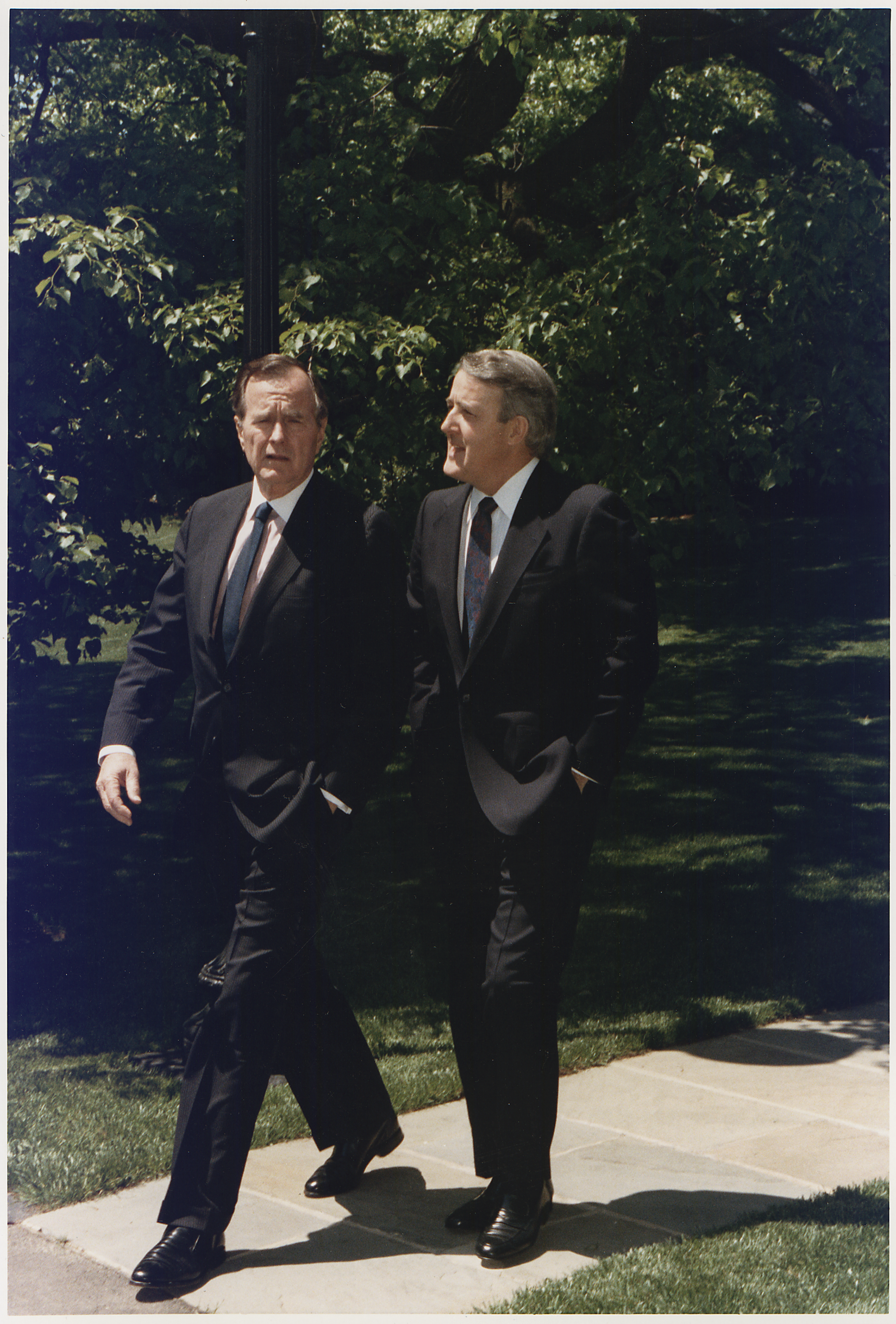
Bush and PM Brian Mulroney at White House

New presidents traditionally make their first foreign trip to Canada. Bush did so on February 10, 1989. He met with Prime Minister Brian Mulroney, and discussed air quality issues especially acid rain. On July 8, 1990, the two countries had "agreed to begin negotiations for a practical and effective air quality accord" and the initial discussions would center around sulfur dioxide reduction as well as other acid rain precursors. They met on March 13, 1991, to discuss developments in the Middle East.

=== Colombia ===
On January 10, 1990, Bush telephoned President of Colombia Virgilio Barco Vargas, stating his regret over false stories regarding a proposed U.S. counternarcotics operation. Bush stated the US intended to engage in a "cooperative effort with Colombia that could complement President Barco's courageous and determined effort to break up the narcotics cartels and bring traffickers to justice" and that America would not conduct any activities within the territorial waters of Colombia. The two agreed on inaccurate reports about relations between the US and Colombia creating a false impression and to remain in close contact on issues relating to both of their countries. The following month, Bush traveled to Colombia for discussions with the country's leadership and to sign the Document of Cartagena, insisting in a statement that it would "establish a broad, flexible framework which will help guide the actions of our four countries in the years to come" throughout their collaborative efforts in the Gulf War. On July 13, Bush met with President-elect César Gaviria during the latter's private visit to the US, Bush congratulating Gaviria on his electoral victory and pledging that his administration was willing to work with Gaviria's. The two also discussed the fight against drugs and economic relations cooperation, Bush informing Gaviria on American budget requests against drugs in the upcoming fiscal year.

=== Cuba ===
In a February 27, 1989, President Bush released a statement supporting the report on human rights in Cuba by the United Nations Human Rights Commission. He criticized inconsistences in the treatment of countries by the UN when it came to the issue of human rights and stated his view on the regime of Fidel Castro: "For more than 30 years, the people of Cuba have languished under a regime which has distinguished itself as one of the most repressive in the world. Last year the international community won an important victory when the U.N. Human Rights Commission decided to conduct a full investigation into the situation in Cuba. The report which was released in Geneva is based on firsthand testimony about persistent violations of human rights in that country and is the culmination of that investigation." He called for " other members of the Commission and all countries that value freedom to maintain pressure on the Cuban Government by continuing U.N. monitoring of the human rights situation in Cuba" and furthered that Cuba's people looked to the UN "as their last best hope." In a July 26 address to commemorate the thirty-sixth anniversary of the start of the Cuban Revolution, Castro said President Bush's trips to Poland and Hungary were "to encourage capitalist trends that have developed there and political problems that have come up there."

At a news conference on March 23, 1990, Bush was asked about what the US would do now that Cuba was the only military regime in their hemisphere and if the US would help the Cuban government in the event that Castro was gone, Bush responding that the US "would rejoice in being able to help a democratically elected government in Cuba" and his conviction that Cubans wanted the same form of democracy and freedom sought in Panama and Nicaragua as well as other countries in that hemisphere. After admitting he felt his comments would be ineffective, Bush said, "I would encourage Castro to move toward free and fair elections. I would encourage him to lighten up on the question of human rights, where he's been unwilling to even welcome the U.N. back to take a look again. And I am not going to change the policy of the United States Government towards Mr. Castro. We're going to continue to try to bring the truth to Cuba, just as we did to Czechoslovakia and Poland and other countries."

In a May 21, 1991 radio address to mark the 89th anniversary of Cuban independence, Bush requested "Fidel Castro to free political prisoners in Cuba and allow the United Nations Commission on Human Rights to investigate possible human rights violations in Cuba". In September, Gorbachev announced the Soviet Union's intent to withdraw troops from Cuba. Shortly thereafter, the Bush administration stated the possibility of the move weakening Castro but officials confirmed the administration's reluctance to become involved in hastening his fall, citing the chances of either turning Cuba into a sour spot in relations between the US and the Soviet Union or action on the part of America antagonizing Latin American allies of the administration. In April 1992 Bush tightened the long-standing embargo against trade with Cuba. On December 31, 1992, the US federal government released forty-five Cubans that had defected to the US through an airliner. The Cuban government had beforehand accused the US of violating international law with its policy of granting political asylum to Cubans.

=== Haiti ===
The Bush administration initially supported Haitian president Jean-Bertrand Aristide. Following the September 1991 military coup against him, the administration immediately called for the restoration of Haiti's democratically elected leader and did not recognize the military junta led by Raoul Cédras. The administration judged Aristide by comparing him to Haiti's previous leaders, and there was also concern that the coup could have an effect on other developing democracies in the hemisphere. However, Bush later criticized the alleged human rights abuses in Haiti under Aristide. Starting in October 1991, his administration distanced itself from Aristide due to his human rights record while still calling for the restoration of constitutional government in Haiti. They pressured Aristide to assure his opponents that there would be no acts of revenge violence, that he would accept reduced powers, and would do more to respect human rights. On June 7, 1992, Bush expressed hope that democracy would be "reinstalled" in Haiti by the OAS economic embargo and said that he had no plans of deploying troops to the country, after reports that the U.S. and several Latin American governments were considering sending peacekeepers.

=== Honduras ===
In March. 1989, the US requested Honduras to allow Nicaraguan guerrillas to remain in their territory for another year. The plea was made by Under Secretary of State for Political Affairs Robert M. Kimmitt during his meeting in Honduras with President José Azcona del Hoyo, concurrently with Honduras officials meeting contra leaders for a discussion on plans to disarm the rebels.

On April 17, 1990, Bush met with Honduras President Rafael Callejas at the White House for a wide-ranging discussion that included their shared satisfaction with the stability of the relationship between the US and Honduras. Bush praised Honduras for its "productive role in achieving a multilateral agreement on the peaceful demobilization and repatriation of the Nicaraguan resistance in conditions of safety for all concerned" and indicated American support for this policy. Bush also pledged American aid "to ensure humanitarian assistance to those in need in both Nicaragua and Honduras as they return to their homes, their families, and their jobs, and play a vital role in helping Nicaragua establish lasting democratic institutions."

=== Nicaragua ===
The ending of the Cold War left Nicaragua without strong Soviet support. By December 1989, President-elect Bush indicated his support for approaching the Nicaraguan government with pressure on moving it toward a democracy while avoiding an early confrontation with Congress over aid to the Nicaraguan Contra rebels. With the help of Costa Rican president Óscar Arias, the Bush administration restored full diplomatic recognition and negotiated the free elections that brought democratic forces to power in Managua. He then sought large sums of U.S. aid from Congress.

=== Venezuela ===
On March 4, 1989, government and banking officials announced the intent of the Bush administration to transfer nearly 2 billion in emergency loans to Venezuela to aid the country amid rioting and murders in Caracas during an economic crisis. Economists and congressional Democrats contended that the Venezuelan events were reflective of the futility of the lending in return for attempts by the debtor nations to overhaul their inflation-wracked economies imposed by the Treasury Department under the leadership of James Baker.

On May 3, 1991, Bush met with President Carlos Andres Perez during a private visit by Perez to the US. The two leaders discussed the El Salvador peace process and their shared satisfaction with the agreement between the El Salvador government and the guerillas the previous week. Bush praised Perez for being part of the peace process in El Salvador and the two also talked about Nicaragua, Haiti democracy, and international oil issues.

=== Panama: Operation Just Cause ===
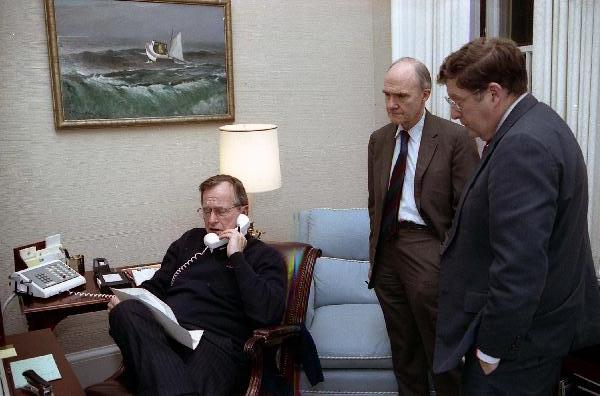
Bush speaks on the telephone regarding Operation Just Cause with General Brent Scowcroft and Chief of Staff John H. Sununu, 1989

In Panama, soldiers and police under orders of dictator Manuel Noriega killed an American Marine. Bush had enough. From the White House point of view, the attacks brought a festering issue to a climax:

Noriega had long been an American ally in Cold War Latin America. Essentially a paid anti-communist in the region, Noriega was a drug trafficker and tyrant who had become more trouble than he was worth. He stole a presidential election, continued to be a center for destabilizing drug running and money-laundering, and his erratic behavior raised concerns about the fate of the Panama Canal.

Bush ordered Operation Just Cause in December 1989, an invasion that was the largest projection of American military power since Vietnam. American forces quickly depose Noriega, who was brought to the United States for trial and imprisonment on narcotics charges.

In January 1990, Bush announced an economic recovery plan for Panama that included the implementing of loans, guarantees, and export opportunities to aid Panama's private sector as well as create jobs and an assistance package intended to balance payment support, public investment and restructuring along with attempting to normalize relations between Panama and the international financial institutions.

The invasion of Panama was criticized on December 22, 1989, when Algeria, Colombia, Nepal, Senegal, and Yugoslavia filed a draft resolution to the United Nation Security Council. They wanted a resolution that “strongly deplores the intervention in Panama...which constitutes a flagrant violation of international law and of the independence, sovereignty and territorial integrity of States”. The draft also requested the immediate withdrawal of troops and end to the conflict. The resolution was vetoed. However, on December 29, 1989, the United Nations General Assembly held an emergency session called by Cuba and Nicaragua. It resulted in a 75–20 vote condemning the action of the United States and those taken by Bush. It also called for a halt of the invasion and a withdrawal of troops. During the assembly, USSR ambassador Alexander M. Belonogov said that “the armed act of U.S. aggression against Panama is a challenge to the international community.”

== Asia ==
=== China ===
Following China's violent suppression of the pro-democracy Tiananmen Square protests of June 1989, Washington and other governments enacted a number of measures against China's violation of human rights. The U.S. suspended high-level official exchanges with the PRC and weapons exports from the US to the PRC. The U.S. also imposed small-scale economic sanctions. In the summer of 1990, at the G7 Houston summit, the West called for renewed political and economic reforms in mainland China, particularly in the field of human rights.

Bush reacted in moderate fashion trying to avoid a major break. At a news conference on January 24, 1990, Bush was asked about his intent to play China against the Soviet Union in the event that Gorbachev fall from power and his successor is in the harsh mold of dictator Joseph Stalin. Bush called China "a key player" in world events and cited its importance in geopolitics for why he would want the US to have either good or improved relations in spite of admitting the current circumstance was "unsatisfactory conditions". Bush also decided that Tiananmen should not interrupt Sino-U.S. relations. He sent special envoy Brent Scowcroft to Beijing to meet with Deng Xiaoping, and certain provisions of the economic sanctions that had been levied against China were waived. George Washington University revealed that, through high-level secret channels on 30 June 1989, the U.S. government conveyed to the government of the People's Republic of China that the events around the Tiananmen Square protests were an "internal affair". Astrophysicist and activist Fang Lizhi and his wife, who had sought refuge at the embassy the day after the Tiananmen massacre, remained in the U.S. Embassy until 25 June 1990, when they were allowed to go into exile in Britain.

==== Trade sanctions ====
Sino-US military ties and arms sales were abruptly terminated in 1989 and as of 2019 have never been restored. In an April 30, 1991 statement, Press Secretary Fitzwater announced that Bush had "decided not to approve a request to license the export of U.S. satellite components to China for a Chinese domestic communications satellite", citing Chinese companies engaging in activities that raised proliferation concerns for the administration and that Bush's decision underscored the US taking nonproliferation seriously. Fitzwater furthered that the US was having ongoing discussions with China aimed at getting China to align with international guidelines on missiles and technology exports related to them. The following month, on May 14, Bush announced the nomination of J. Stapleton Roy to succeed Lilley as US ambassador to China. Tiananmen event disrupted the US-China trade relationship, and US investors' interest in mainland China dropped dramatically. Tourist traffic fell off sharply. The Bush administration denounced the repression and suspended certain trade and investment programs on June 5 and 20, 1989, however Congress was responsible for imposing many of these actions, and the White House itself took a far less critical attitude of Beijing, repeatedly expressing hope that the two countries could maintain normalized relations. Some sanctions were legislated while others were executive actions. Examples include:

- The US Trade and Development Agency (TDA): new activities in mainland China were suspended from June 1989 until January 2001, when President Bill Clinton lifted this suspension.
- Overseas Private Insurance Corporation (OPIC): new activities have been suspended since June 1989.
- Development Bank Lending/International Monetary Fund (IMF) Credits: the United States does not support development bank lending and will not support IMF credits to the PRC except for projects that address basic human needs.
- Munitions List Exports: subject to certain exceptions, no licenses may be issued for the export of any defense article on the US Munitions List. This restriction may be waived upon a presidential national interest determination.
- Arms Imports – import of defense articles from the PRC was banned after the imposition of the ban on arms exports to the PRC. The import ban was subsequently waived by the Administration and reimposed on May 26, 1994. It covers all items on the BATFE's Munitions Import List. During this critical period, J. Stapleton Roy, a career US Foreign Service Officer, served as ambassador to Beijing.

After Tiananmen Square, Sino-US relations deteriorated sharply, falling to their worst since the 1960s. Beijing since the 1950s had feared an American "conspiracy to subvert Chinese socialism". The period 1989 to 1992 also witnessed a revival of hard-line Maoist ideologies and increased paranoia by the PRC as communist regimes collapsed in Eastern Europe. Nonetheless, China continued to seek foreign business and investment.

=== India ===
India and the U.S. squabbled over technicalities in trade arrangements. In the first months of the Bush administration, the US pressed for India to enforce stronger patent protection laws or be subject to retaliatory trade measures. American and Indian officials discussed the matter in March during a Washington visit. The subject was seen as threatening to a joint scientific program involving the US and India. In May 1989, responding to the US placing India on a list of countries that were unfair traders, Commerce Minister Dinesh Singh charged the US with being in violation with the agreements it agreed to under the General Agreement on Tariffs and Trade and that India regarded "this law and action under it as totally unjustified, irrational and unfair."

In May 1991, former Indian prime minister Rajiv Gandhi was assassinated by suicide bomber. Bush condemned the assassination as a "terrible tragedy" that would not undermine the function of democracy in India and said that it was "a time for calm, for peaceful resolution to differences", a concept he furthered was understood by Gandhi and his family.

=== North Korea ===
Throughout 1989, the Bush administration conducted a quiet diplomatic effort to persuade North Korea to turn over its nuclear installations to international safeguards. On October 25 of that year, administration officials confirmed their concerns that North Korea was trying to develop nuclear weapons.

During a January 6, 1992 news conference Bush held with South Korean president Roh Tae Woo, Woo told reporters that the two leaders had "jointly reaffirmed the unshakable position that North Korea must sign and ratify a nuclear safeguard agreement and that the recently initiated joint declaration for a nonnuclear peninsula must be put into force at the earliest possible date." Bush called for both North and South Korea to implement bilateral inspection arrangements under the joint nonnuclear declaration from the previous month and stated North Korea's obligation with these terms would result in the US and South Korea willfully forgoing the Team Spirit exercise that year. Roh said the US and South Korea would partner in efforts to end nuclear weapon development in North Korea and have the country abandon nuclear processing plants and reduce enrichment facilities.

=== South Korea ===
In September 1989, Vice President Dan Quayle traveled to Seoul to meet with President of South Korea Roh Tae-woo, Quayle stating that the US was committed to South Korea's security and the US supported removing American military faculties from Seoul. Roh expressed satisfaction with the administration's insuring stability for Korea and aiding South Korea's development.

On October 20, 1991, Bush administration officials announced their intention to withdraw American nuclear weapons from South Korea. The move was intended to convince North Korea to authorize international inspection of its own nuclear plants and partly was caused by American officials no longer considering the bombs necessary to defend South Korea.

=== Japan ===
In its first months, the Bush administration negotiated with Japan to collaborate on a project that would produce a jet fighter. While supporters viewed the joint project as allowing the US access to Japanese technology and prevent Japan from constructing its own aircraft, the agreement attracted bipartisan criticism from members of Congress who believed the deal would give American technology to Japan and allow the country to form a major aeronautics industry. Bush announced the completion of the deal on April 28, 1989, assessing the aircraft as providing an improvement in the defense of both America and Japan.

During a March 1, 1990 visit to the office of former president Reagan, Bush was asked about his upcoming meeting with Prime Minister Toshiki Kaifu, Bush answering that the meeting would be interesting given Kaifu had "just solidified his position in the party and he's been reanointed. And we've got to convince him that we've got to move forward with some of the tough problems, as you know." On March 12, Bush met with former prime minister of Japan Noboru Takeshita for an hour to discuss shared economic issues and "the fact that their solution will require extraordinary efforts on both sides of the Pacific." On April 28, Bush announced Japan was being removed from the list of countries the US was targeting with reprisal tariffs for what was considered unfair trading practices on the part of Japan. The decision came at the recommendation of U.S. Trade Representative Carla A. Hills and was hailed by Japanese officials. The move also came at a time when the US had a $50 billion trade deficit with Japan, and congressional critics said the choice was prior to the obtaining of verifiable results. On July 28, Bush announced he would not block the sale of Semi-Gas Systems Inc. to Japan's Nippon Sanso. The Committee on Foreign Investment in the United States recommended Bush not interfere in the Nippon Sanso bid.

In April 1991, Bush met with Prime Minister Kaifu, Bush stating afterward that the pair were "committed to see that that bashing doesn't go forward and that this relationship goes on." Bush confirmed the US would like access to the Japanese rice market and that Kaifu had explained the objections being raised in Japan, Bush furthering that a resolution to the issue could be reached under the General Agreement on tariffs and trade. In November, during an address in New York, Bush stated that bashing Japan had become a regularity in parts of the US and had served to strain relations. Two days later, Chief Cabinet Secretary Koichi Kato said that Japan had mixed feelings toward the US and that Japan was appreciative by American efforts to reduce the US budget deficit. On December 7, the fiftieth anniversary of the attack on Pearl Harbor, Bush accepted an apology from Japan over the event issued by Prime Minister Kiichi Miyazawa the previous day and urged progress be made in improving relations between the US and Japan.

In January 1992, during a speech at Andrews Air Force Base, Bush stated his upcoming trip to Japan would produce American exports that would lead to more jobs. This portion of the speech "was quickly overshadowed by the Government's announcement that unemployment rose to 7.1 percent in December, the highest rate in six years." White House Chief of Staff Samuel K. Skinner replied to the release of the figures by saying they made the trip "more important than ever." Aboard Air Force One, Bush explained the positive of the trip would be securing a deal with Japan featuring the country pledging to buy an additional 10 billion in American auto parts each year until 1995 and that 200,000 jobs would be created over this period.

== Gulf War ==
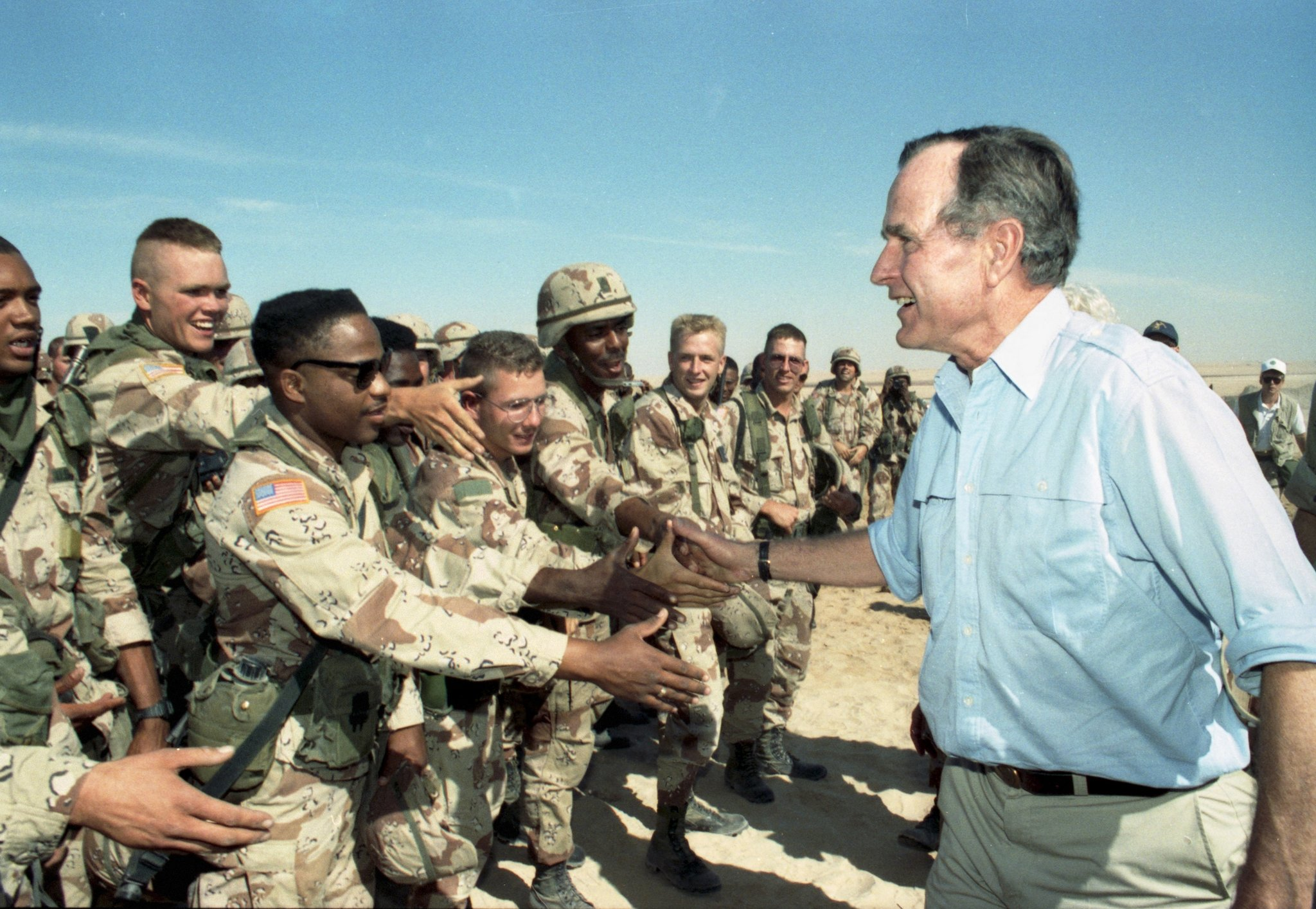
President Bush visited American troops in Saudi Arabia on Thanksgiving Day, 1990

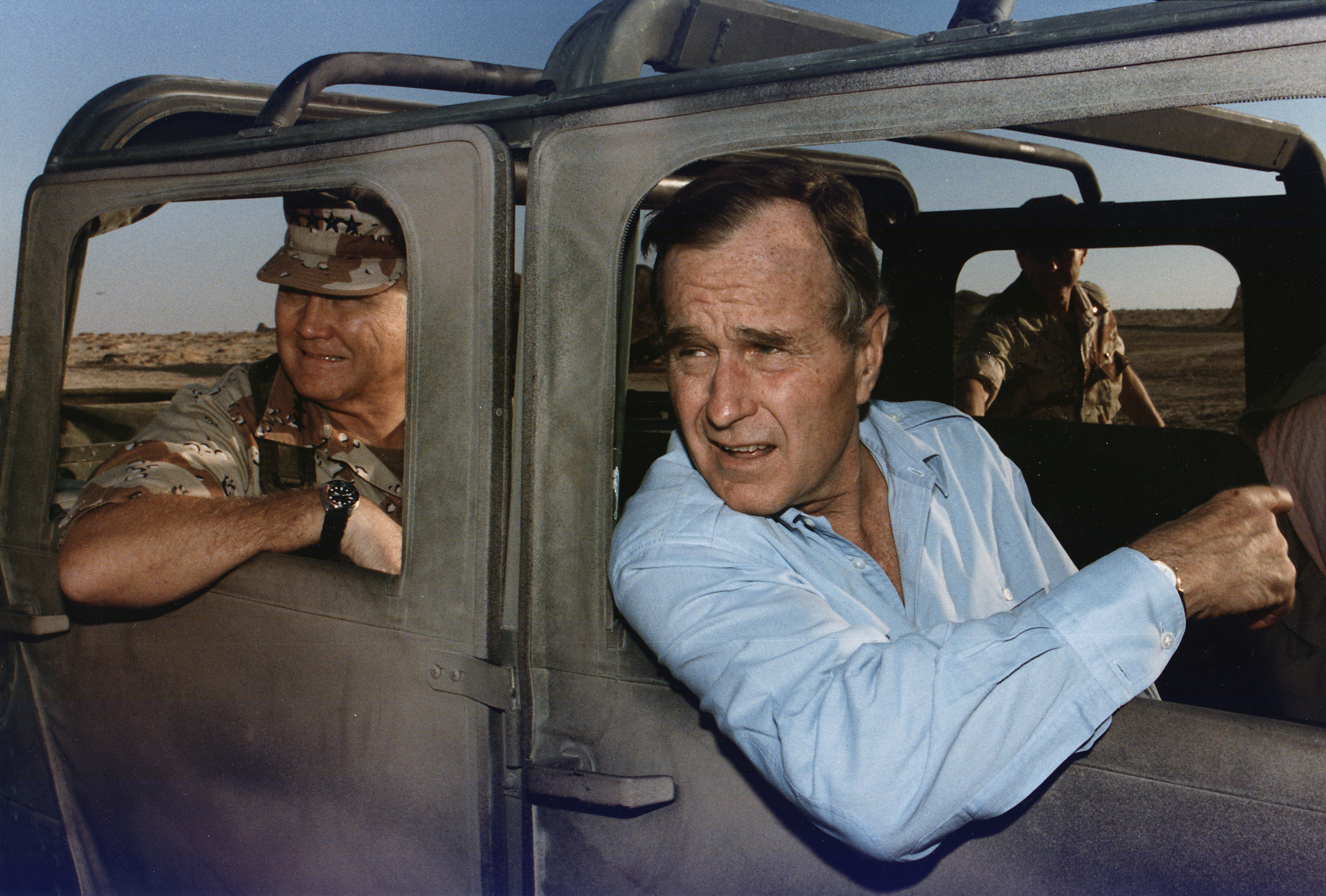
General Norman Schwarzkopf, Jr. and President George Bush visit US troops in Saudi Arabia on Thanksgiving Day, 1990.

On August 2, 1990, Iraq, led by Saddam Hussein, invaded its oil-rich neighbor to the south, Kuwait. Early reports noted extensive casualties and Iraq warned against foreign intervention. National Security Advisor Brent Scowcroft was reported to have informed President Bush of the military action during the evening and State Department officials engaged in a late night discussion over the matter. The following morning, President Bush reiterated American condemnation of Iraq and announced his directing of Tom Pickering to collaborate with Kuwait "in convening an emergency meeting of the Security Council" and his signing of Executive Orders "freezing Iraqi assets in this country and prohibiting transactions with Iraq" and "freezing Kuwaiti assets", the latter executive order being intended to prevent Iraq from interfering with Kuwait's assets during its occupation. Secretary of Defense Dick Cheney traveled to Saudi Arabia to meet with King Fahd; Fahd requested US military aid in the matter, fearing a possible invasion of his country as well. The request was met initially with Air Force fighter jets. Iraq made attempts to negotiate a deal that would allow the country to take control of half of Kuwait. Bush rejected this proposal and insisted on a complete withdrawal of Iraqi forces. The planning of a ground operation by US-led coalition forces began forming in September 1990, headed by General Norman Schwarzkopf.

Bush decided on war. On September 11, 1990, Bush spoke before a joint session of the U.S. Congress regarding the authorization of air and land attacks, laying out four immediate objectives: "Iraq must withdraw from Kuwait completely, immediately, and without condition. Kuwait's legitimate government must be restored. The security and stability of the Persian Gulf must be assured. And American citizens abroad must be protected." He then outlined a fifth, long-term objective: "Out of these troubled times, our fifth objective – a new world order – can emerge: a new era – freer from the threat of terror, stronger in the pursuit of justice, and more secure in the quest for peace. An era in which the nations of the world, East and West, North and South, can prosper and live in harmony.... A world where the rule of law supplants the rule of the jungle. A world in which nations recognize the shared responsibility for freedom and justice. A world where the strong respect the rights of the weak." With the United Nations Security Council opposed to Iraq's violence, Congress passed the Authorization for Use of Military Force Against Iraq Resolution of 1991 signed by President Bush on January 14, 1991 with a set goal of returning control of Kuwait to the Kuwaiti government, and protecting America's interests abroad.

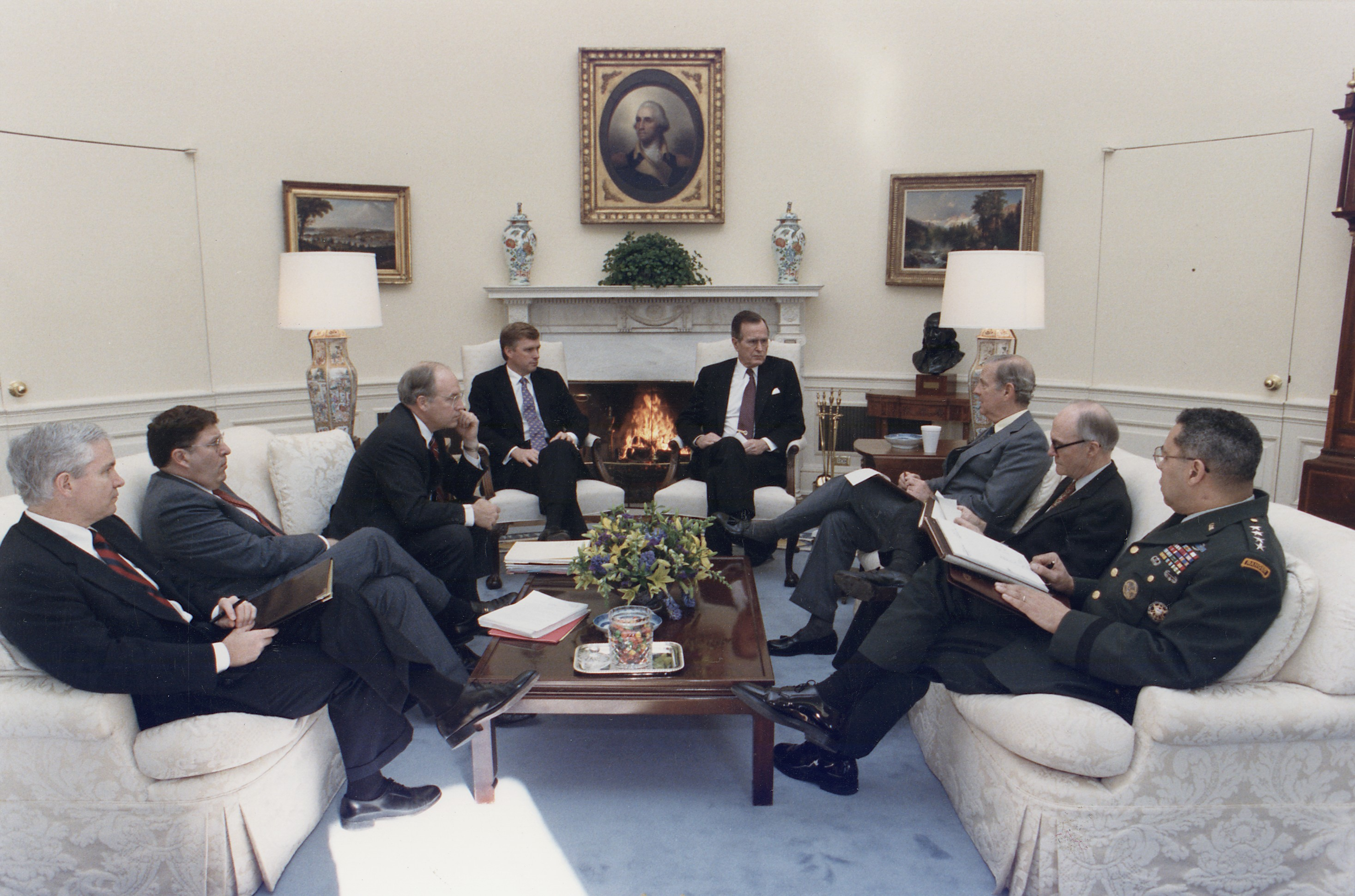
Bush meets with Robert Gates, General Colin Powell, Secretary Dick Cheney and others about the situation in the Persian Gulf and Operation Desert Shield, January 15, 1991

On January 16, 1991, Bush addressed the nation from the Oval Office, announcing that "allied air forces began an attack on military targets in Iraq and Kuwait. These attacks continue as I speak".

Early on the morning of January 17, 1991, Coalition forces launched the first attack, which included more than 4,000 bombing runs by coalition aircraft. This pace would continue for the next four weeks, until a ground invasion was launched on February 24, 1991. Coalition forces penetrated Iraqi lines and pushed toward Kuwait City while on the west side of the country, forces were intercepting the retreating Iraqi army. Bush made the decision to stop the offensive after a mere 100 hours. Critics labeled this decision premature, as hundreds of Iraqi forces were able to escape; Bush responded by saying that he wanted to minimize U.S. casualties. Opponents further charged that Bush should have continued the attack, pushing Hussein's army back to Baghdad, then removing him from power. Bush explained that he did not give the order to overthrow the Iraqi government because it would have "incurred incalculable human and political costs.... We would have been forced to occupy Baghdad and, in effect, rule Iraq."

Bush's approval ratings skyrocketed after the successful offensive. Additionally, President Bush and Secretary of State Baker felt the coalition victory had increased U.S. prestige abroad and believed there was a window of opportunity to use the political capital generated by the coalition victory to revitalize the Arab-Israeli peace process. The administration immediately returned to Arab-Israeli peacemaking following the end of the Gulf War; this resulted in the Madrid Conference, later in 1991.

== Soviet Union ==
=== 1989 ===
In January 1989, Brent Scowcroft voiced his belief that the Cold War had not concluded and Soviet general secretary Mikhail Gorbachev was attempting to cause issues for the Western alliance. When asked about these comments during his first news conference in office a week later on January 27, Bush said of the administration's position on the Soviet Union, "Let's take our time now. Let's take a look at where we stand on our strategic arms talks; on conventional force talks; on chemical, biological weapons talks; on some of our bilateral policy problems with the Soviet Union; formulate the policy and then get out front -- here's the U.S. position." When asked about the possibility of superpower deals being offered to the US on February 6, Bush said he was unsure but spoke of the influence the Soviet Union could have on the administration's willingness to engage Central America: "I can see a possibility of cooperation in Central America because I would like the Soviets to understand that we have very special interests in this hemisphere, particularly in Central America, and that our commitment to democracy and to freedom and free elections and these principles is unshakeable." On February 9, during an address to a joint session of Congress, Bush called for change in the world and singled out the Soviet Union as an area he wished to improve relations with, citing "fundamental facts remain that the Soviets retain a very powerful military machine in the service of objectives which are still too often in conflict with ours" and that he had personally assured Gorbachev that the US would be ready to move forward after reviewing its policies there. In a speech at the Annual Conference of the Veterans of Foreign Wars on March 6, Bush addressed "the key issue of change within the Soviet Union" where more questions lingered than answers and offered a position the federal government could deploy amid uncertainty over the Soviet Union's future: "We should press for progress that contributes to a more stable relationship between the United States and the Soviet Union, but we must combine our readiness to build better relations with a resolve to maintain defenses adequate to secure our interests."

In 1989, just after the fall of the Berlin Wall, Bush met with Gorbachev in a conference on the Mediterranean island of Malta. The administration had been under intense pressure to meet with the Soviets, but not all initially found the Malta Summit to be a step in the right direction; General Brent Scowcroft, among others, was apprehensive about the meeting, saying that it might be "premature" due to concerns where, according to Condoleezza Rice, "expectations [would be] set that something was going to happen, where the Soviets might grandstand and force [the U.S.] into agreements that would ultimately not be good for the United States." But European leaders, including François Mitterrand and Margaret Thatcher, encouraged Bush to meet with Gorbachev, something that he did December 2 and 3, 1989. Though no agreements were signed, the meeting was viewed largely as being an important one; when asked about nuclear war, Gorbachev responded, "I assured the President of the United States that the Soviet Union would never start a hot war against the United States of America. And we would like our relations to develop in such a way that they would open greater possibilities for cooperation.... This is just the beginning. We are just at the very beginning of our road, long road to a long-lasting, peaceful period." The meeting was received as a very important step to the end of the Cold War.

=== 1990 ===
On New Year's Day 1990, a message recorded by Bush in mid-December was televised in the Soviet Union, during which he described his meetings with Gorbachev as having resulted in an agreement for the US and Soviet Union to "redouble our efforts to diminish the horrible threat from weapons of mass destruction and to pursue with other nations an agreement to reduce conventional forces in Europe" amid discussions "about ways we can end regional conflicts and alleviate the terrible toll in human suffering they bring." He reaffirmed his support for "the dynamic process of reform in the Soviet Union" and pledged to assist with reductions in trade barriers along with investment and the goods and ideas free movement.

On April 6, Bush held a morning meeting with Soviet foreign minister Eduard Shevardnadze, where Bush advocated for continued peaceful dialog in Lithuania and stated the United States was not recognizing Lithuania's forcible incorporation into the Soviet Union. Bush outlined the US position on the matter as recognizing the self-determination demonstrated by Lithuania and favoring the Soviet Union not undertake any actions that might sink the possibility of a peaceful resolution thorough communications and agreement. Bush noted the Soviet Union's position against direct flights to Israel, urging a reconsideration.

On June 1, Bush and Gorbachev signed bilateral agreements in the East Room eliminating a majority of chemical weapons in both the US and Soviet Union, imposing protocols on limiting nuclear testing, and an expansion of the 1973 agreement on peaceful uses of atomic energy incorporating larger cooperation between the US and Soviet Union on both atomic energy research and civilian nuclear safety. Bush said the agreements would advance the cause for world peace while Gorbachev invoked the four essential freedoms described half a century earlier by U.S. president Franklin D. Roosevelt.

On December 12, after speaking with Minister of Foreign Affairs of the Soviet Union Eduard Shevardnadze on issues having to do with relations between the US and Soviet Union, Bush stated he was "pleased with the great progress that we made on START and hopeful that we will be ready to sign a treaty at a summit in Moscow on February 11 through 13th." He also stated that he had directed Shevardnadze to convey his support for the US responding "both to the short-term needs of the Soviet Union and to contribute to fundamental economic reform" and that he had indicated to the minister his own readiness "to respond to a Soviet request for credit guarantees for purchase of agricultural commodities through a waiver of the Jackson-Vanik amendment." Bush pledged he would propose both the World Bank and IMF partner with the Soviet Union to grant the USSR a special association which would grant it access to "considerable financial and economic expertise of those institutions."

=== 1991 ===
Another summit was held in July 1991, where the Strategic Arms Reduction Treaty (START I) was signed by Bush and Gorbachev in Moscow. The treaty took nine years in the making and was the first major arms agreement since the signing of the Intermediate Ranged Nuclear Forces Treaty by Reagan and Gorbachev in 1987. The contentions in START would reduce the strategic nuclear weapons of the United States and the USSR by about 35% over seven years, and the Soviet Union's land-based intercontinental ballistic missiles would be cut by 50%. Bush described START as "a significant step forward in dispelling half a century of mistrust".

Bush and Condoleezza Rice were criticized for their very weak tone and miscalculation in the Chicken Kiev speech on August 1, 1991, 3 weeks before the Declaration of Independence of Ukraine, 4 months before the 92.26%-confirmed Ukrainian independence referendum, and 145 days before the dissolution of the Soviet Union.

The August 1991 Soviet coup d'état attempt featured an unsuccessful attempt by members of the Soviet government to overthrow Gorbachev. Days later, on August 20, President Bush issued a statement supporting Gorbachev's continued rule and affirming the US not accepting the legitimacy of the self-described new Soviet government. Bush called the coup an illegal effort that went against the will of Soviet people. This second comment of his was "in keeping with a unified Western effort to apply both diplomatic and economic pressure to the group of Soviet officials seeking to gain control of the Kremlin and the country."

In November, the Bush administration announced President Bush's decision to increase the availability of food assistance to the Soviet Union and Republics to cope with both food shortages and restructuring of their food distribution system. The choice was the result of conducting four expert missions on the subject of food to the Soviet Union and the agreement had been completed during discussions with Republics and the Inter-Republic Food Committee.

On December 12, the RSFSR Supreme Soviet ratified the Belevezha Accords and denounced the 1922 Union Treaty, making it apparent that the momentum towards dissolution could not be stopped. Gorbachev hinted that he was considering stepping aside, Bush being asked about this possibility by reporters shortly thereafter and responding that the US was closely monitoring the situation and reiterated the US position of supporting "those who are for democracy". Bush furthered that it was "not for the United States to dictate these matters" despite admitting the US had interests in its outcome. In a December 27 speech in Bee County Rodeo Arena, Bush declared that the US had won the Cold War and reflected warmly on Gorbachev: "On Wednesday, Christmas Day, Soviet communism and the Soviet State died. President Gorbachev, who deserves great credit for reform, perestroika and openness, glasnost, stepped aside. And Russians pulled down the hammer and sickle, that flag that has flown over the Kremlin for so many years, more than 70 years, and ran up the tricolor flag of a free Russia." He also stated that he had spoken with both Gorbachev and Russian president Yeltsin over the course of the week.

== Europe ==
During the 1990 State of the Union Address, Bush announced a change in American troop occupation in Europe and his reason for doing so,

I agree with our European allies that an American military presence in Europe is essential and that it should not be tied solely to the Soviet military presence in Eastern Europe. But our troop levels can still be lower. And so, tonight I am announcing a major new step for a further reduction in U.S. and Soviet manpower in Central and Eastern Europe to 195,000 on each side. This level reflects the advice of our senior military advisers. It's designed to protect American and European interests and sustain NATO's defense strategy. A swift conclusion to our arms control talks -- conventional, chemical, and strategic -- must now be our goal. And that time has come.

=== France ===
On May 21, 1989, Bush and French president François Mitterrand met for three hours, French foreign minister Roland Dumas saying that the two had reviewed the issues facing the North Atlantic Treaty Organization, and that France had endorsed American efforts to resolve the dispute.

On December 16, 1989, Bush and Mitterrand held a joint press conference, during which both Bush and Mitterrand stated the positive relationship they had as well as in terms of the relations between the United States and France.

On November 25, 1992, Bush administration officials stated that Bush had sent a letter to Mitterrand and British prime minister John Major aiming to enlist their support in "the creation of an international civilian force that could include Americans to monitor Serbian repression of the Albanian majority in Kosovo".

=== Central Europe ===
==== Czechoslovakia ====
On February 21, 1990, Bush met with President of Czechoslovakia Václav Havel in the Oval Office where they discussed Europe's future and agreed to stay in touch amid the eventful period. The pair agreed on the reforms of Soviet leader Gorbachev and that the presence of American troops had served to help stabilize Europe.

==== Germany ====
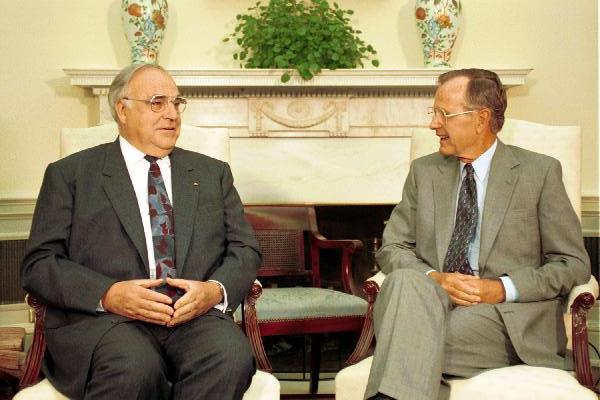
President Bush and German chancellor Helmut Kohl, 1991

From February 24–25, 1990, Bush met with Chancellor of Germany Helmut Kohl at Camp David for discussions on developments in Europe as well as relations between the western and eastern parts of the continent. Saying the pair shared "similar views on the most fundamental issues", Bush noted their perspective of supporting movement of German unification, a prospective unified Germany remaining a full member of the North Atlantic Treaty Organization, and their willingness to collaborate on "a CFE agreement ready for signature this year at a summit meeting of all 35 CSCE member states." Bush paid attention to domestic public opinion. Serious doubts about reunification were voiced by the Jewish-American and Polish-American communities—whose families had suffered immensely from German fascism. However, the largely positive public opinion towards German unification in the United States generally corresponded to the sentiments of the usually passive German-American community.

Kohl took the lead in on 28 November 1989 with a 10-point list of demands that had the effect of forcing the quick reunification of Germany. Gorbachev was stunned, calling it an ultimatum. Thatcher, Mitterrand and the other Europeans were all highly suspicious of Germany and did not want unification to come soon. Bush provided necessary support to Kohl success. Full unification took place in October 1990 after West Germany paid Moscow large sums to remove their troops.

==== Poland ====
When asked if he believed the political agreement in Poland earlier in the week had the possibility of becoming a model for Eastern Europe political reforms during an April 7, 1989 news conference, Bush said, "I would say that the roundtable development there in Poland is very positive, and I would certainly commend the parties getting together there. I go back to when we were there not very many months ago, and many of you were with me on that trip. I think the situation has moved so fast since that trip that I took a year or two ago that it's mind-boggling." On July 11, Bush announced a six-part program of US aid to Poland during a speech to a joint meeting of the Polish Parliament while on his first Eastern Europe trip as president. Bush said he would call on the World Bank to continue with 325 million in new loans in addition to requesting Western allies support the rescheduling of debts that could amount to $5 billion that year and propose 100 million in funds for the Polish private sector to Congress. Polish government spokesman Wieslaw Gornicki said Bush's proposal offered "very little concrete material" and complained about what considered Bush's continued emphasis on the need for further sacrifices by the Polish people and furthered that Bush had made excessive "rhetorical formulations." On August 1, in a statement, Bush announced the US would "provide additional support for the Polish people and the democratization process" and the commodities sold in Poland would be used to aid the funding of Polish agricultural development activities.

On February 23, 1990, the United States and Poland signed an agreement for the latter country to receive a Peace Corps program. Under the agreement, 60 Americans were slated to go to Poland in June to assist with English language training. The following month, on March 21, Prime Minister Tadeusz Mazowiecki and Bush met for the first time in person during a welcoming ceremony at the White House. There, Bush praised Mazowiecki as " a great Polish patriot and patron of freedom, Tadeusz Mazowiecki, one of the founding fathers of Solidarity -- a man who survived the dark days of December 1981 and the heavy hand of martial law, endured a year in prison, life in the underground, editor of the illegal newspaper of an outlawed trade union." On May 23, Bush announced the nomination of Thomas W. Simons, Jr. for United States Ambassador to Poland.

In late March 1991, President of Poland Lech Wałęsa traveled to the US, attending a White House welcoming ceremony where Bush praised him for his favoring of a democracy and backing of American efforts in the Gulf War. Wałęsa expressed gratitude and referred to the friendship between the US and Poland as well as stating that Bush was the most popular politician in Poland. Later that day, Bush told Wałęsa that he had requested Congress agree to increase in grant assistance to new democracies such as the one in Poland the following year and announced "two new economic initiatives designed to help the nations of Central and Eastern Europe proceed along the path to growth and prosperity." In remarks directly following the announcement, Wałęsa declared, "The relations between the Republic of Poland and the United States have today reached their peak after the war. One could even say that they reached their peak in the whole of history. Our countries are linked by common values and the same ideals. We are linked by friendly collaboration on the international arena. I would like this to be followed by a development of mutually advantageous economic cooperation." In June, during a joint news conference with Wałęsa, Vice President Quayle voiced US support for economic reform in Poland, saying that "money and assistance are not adequate".

=== Italy ===
In May 1991, Bush held an Oval Office meeting with President of Italy Francesco Cossiga and Prime Minister of Italy Giulio Andreotti for discussions on the Middle East, security issues in Europe, and Eastern Europe, the three addressing "the need for continued urgent humanitarian relief for the Kurdish refugees and the need to provide security for their prompt and safe return to their villages." Both Cossiga and Andreotti stated their belief in the US playing an essential role in the assurance of European security.

=== Russia ===
On December 20, 1991, Russia fired an unarmed long-range nuclear missile for a test of its commercial space launchings while notifying the Bush administration in advance. American defense officials said that the electronic data encoded from the test by Moscow had been in violation of the not ratified strategic arms reduction treaty while expressing the view that the launch seemed to be for peaceful purposes. The missile launch was disclosed publicly a month later on January 22.

In a January 1992 interview, Russian president Boris Yeltsin announced the Russian government's intent to cease aiming its long term missiles at American cities, confirming that he had communicated with President Bush about his intentions. The White House responded to the shift in policy toward the US as welcome. At a joint news conference with Yeltsin on February 1 at Camp David, President Bush proclaimed, " Today, for the first time, an American President and the democratically elected President of an independent Russia have met, and we did so not as adversaries but as friends. This historic meeting is yet another confirmation of the end of the cold war and the dawn of a new era. Russia and the United States are charting a new relationship." Bush and Yeltsin meet for three and a half hours, both signing a declaration outlining general rules for the relationship between the US and Russia, the rules stipulated in the declaration largely being the same standards posed prior to the Soviet Union collapsing and Gorbachev's resignation. Yeltsin mentioned both countries reduce their strategic and tactical nuclear warheads to 2,500, a matter that Bush said would be addressed by an upcoming Moscow visit by Secretary Baker. In June, Secretary Baker met with Andrei V. Kozyrev in London for a three-hour discussion designed to be a last minute effort to secure a completion of new arm accords prior to the summit meeting between Yeltsin and Bush. Both sides offered new compromises amid continuous gaps, Baker saying at a joint conference with Kozyrev that there had been "some movement by both sides in an effort to bring about an agreement that would lead to deep reductions in strategic weapons and reductions in the most destabilizing of those weapons." On June 20, the Bush administration announced it had made a deal with Yeltsin resolving the fate of the U.S. embassy in Moscow, State Department spokesman Richard A. Boucher stating that the new agreement would have the US abandoning its demand for $30 million from Moscow as a form of compensation for reconstruction costs for the bugged building while the US would gain more land to build in Moscow along with favorable lease terms and the authority to create a secure building of its own without having to hire employees native to Moscow. Boucher furthered that the concessions would outweigh the cost of dropping the $30 million claim over the previous building. On November 30, weeks after Bush lost his re-election bid and on the eve of the Congress of People's Deputies meeting in Moscow, Bush engaged in a telephone call with Yeltsin, discussing relations between their countries and Bush pledging the US would continue to support the Russian government.

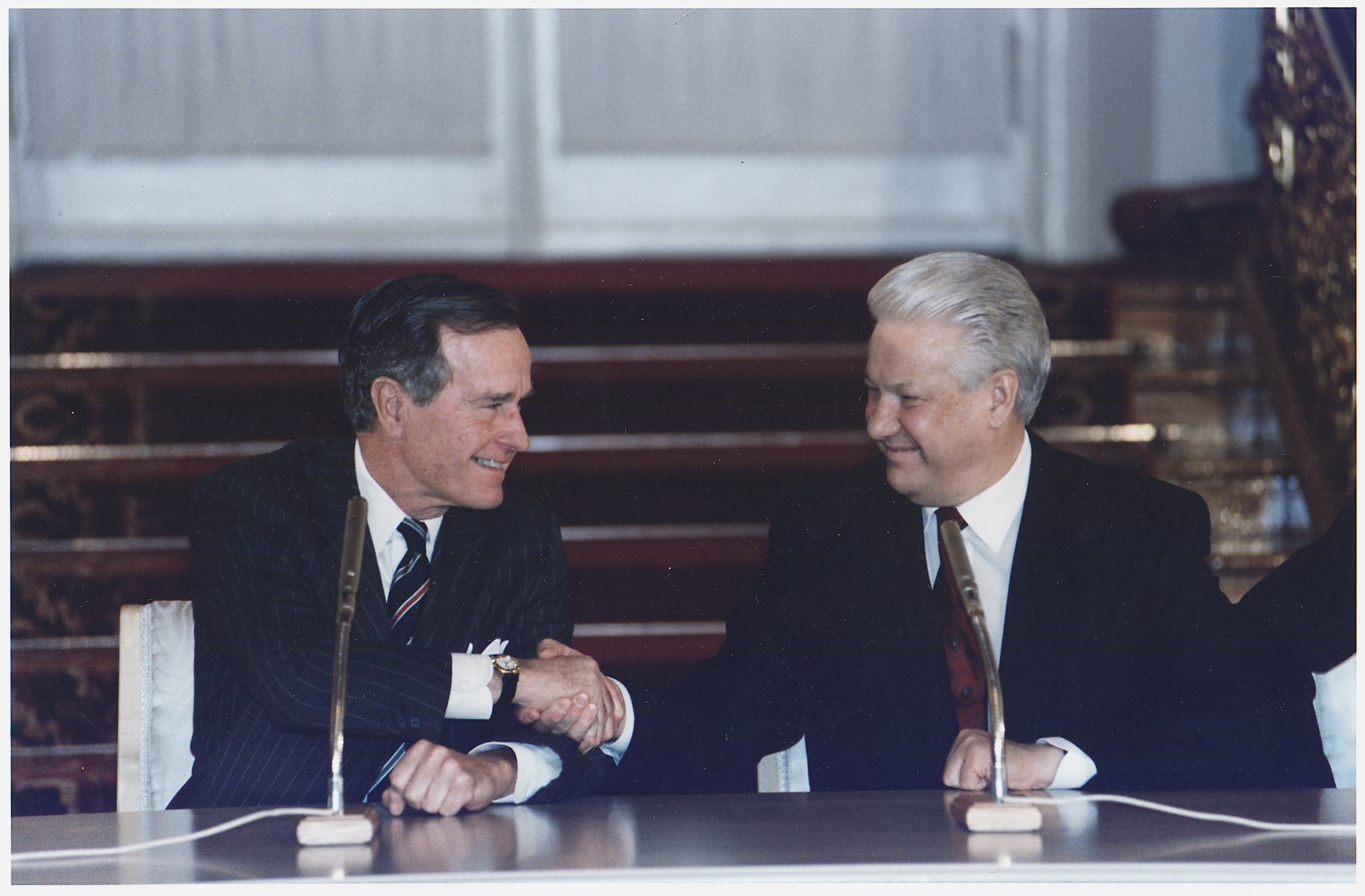
President Bush and Russian President Boris Yeltsin sign the Start II Treaty at a Ceremony in Vladimir Hall, The Kremlin in Moscow, Russia, 3 January 1993

On January 3, 1993, Bush and Yeltsin signed START II, a bilateral treaty banning the use of multiple independently targetable reentry vehicles (MIRVs) on intercontinental ballistic missiles (ICBMs). After the signing, Yeltsin said, "In its scale and importance, the treaty goes further than all other treaties ever signed in the field of disarmament. This treaty is the triumph for politicians and diplomats of Russia and the United States. It is also an achievement for all mankind and benefits all peoples of the Earth. The START II treaty becomes the core of the system of global security guarantees." In his remarks following these, Bush noted this as the first instance of a US president interacting with a democratically elected Russian president, and the day marked an attempt to turn former adversaries into allies.

=== United Kingdom ===
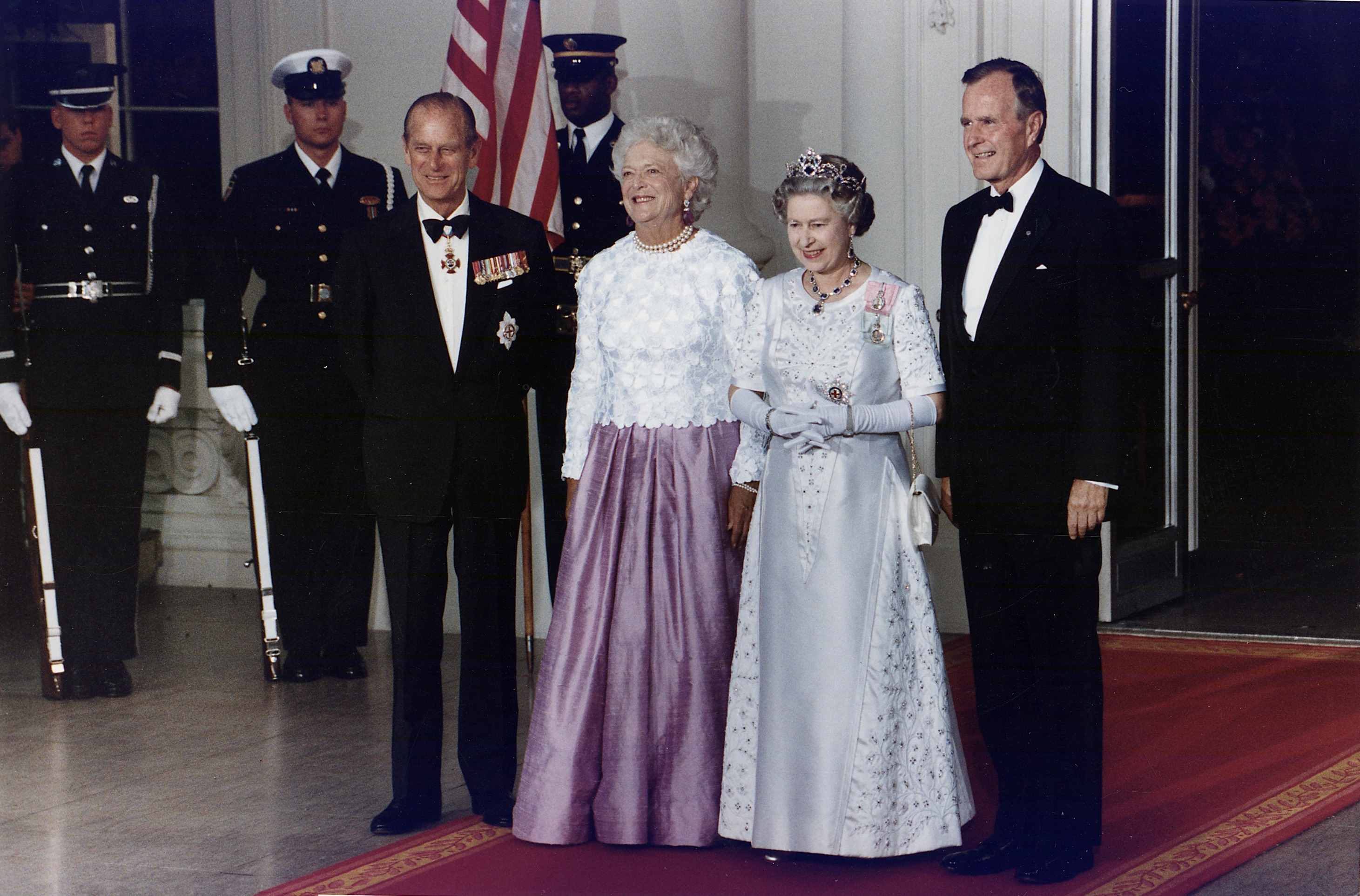
President and Mrs. Bush with Queen Elizabeth II and Prince Philip at the White House

On April 13, 1990, Bush met with Prime Minister Margaret Thatcher for discussions on international issues afflicting the North Atlantic alliance such as German reunification, NATO, talks on the status of convention forces in Europe, the Lithuania situation, Iraq, and COCOM. The conservatism of "Thatcherism" made her comfortable with Republicans such as Reagan and Bush. She pushed Bush to intervene aggressively in Kuwait, citing the failure of appeasement in the 1930s. However that closeness increased anti-American feelings on the British left.

=== Yugoslavia ===
The President George H.W. Bush administration strenuously supported the territorial and political integrity of the former Yugoslavia and discouraged the secessionist movements in Croatia and Slovenia. Bush believed that the United States should not "fight its fourth war in Europe this century," and Baker agreed that "We don't have a dog in this fight." Bush and Baker both preferred to have the European Community handle the Yugoslav Wars. The apex of this U.S. policy was reached with the US secretary of state James Baker trip to Belgrade on June 21, 1991, supporting the country's unity, warning about the "dangers of disintegration" and announcing that the United States would not recognize secessionist republics. The Yugoslav People's Army took Baker's stand as a "green light" to use force against the breakaway states. George H.W. Bush Administration only recognised Croatia as an independent country on April 7, 1992, the last of any Western country to do so. The Bush administration began to become more involved in the Yugoslav conflict with the siege of Sarajevo during the Bosnian War. Bush secured the passage of United Nations Security Council Resolution 757 and authorized humanitarian aid to Bosnia and Herzegovina. However, Bush remained hesitant to place large numbers of U.S. troops in the area.

== Africa ==
=== Somalia ===
Faced with a humanitarian disaster in Somalia, exacerbated by a complete breakdown in civil order, the United Nations had created the UNOSOM I mission in April 1992 to aid the situation through humanitarian efforts, though the mission failed. The Bush administration proposed American aid to the region by assisting in creating a secure environment for humanitarian efforts and UN Resolution 794 was unanimously adopted by the Security Council on December 3, 1992. A lame duck president, Bush launched Operation Restore Hope the following day under which the United States would assume command in accordance with Resolution 794. Fighting would escalate and continue into the Clinton administration.

=== South Africa ===
Diplomatic visits between the two nations increased near the end of apartheid. Secretary of State James Baker helped broker the release after decades of prison of African National Congress (ANC) leader Nelson Mandela. In February 1990, Both Mandela and South African president F.W. de Klerk Were invited to the White House. Mandela, recently released from prison, visited Washington on 24 June 1990 and met with President Bush and other officials. He also addressed a joint session of Congress. In September, de Klerk visited Washington, the first official state visit by a South African leader. The White House was pleased with progress and lifted the longtime sanctions against South Africa.

=== Zaire ===
Mobutu Sese Seko enjoyed a cordial relationship with George H. W. Bush; he was the first African head of state to visit Bush at the White House.

== Middle East ==
During a news conference on February 21, 1989, Bush was asked about the administration's policy on the Middle East, answering, "Middle East policy is to encourage discussions between King Hussein and the Israelis and to build on the progress that has been made already. I've already said that I think it was very useful -- the changes that the PLO [Palestine Liberation Organization] advocated. Now we want to see that there's some follow-on there." He furthered that the administration was currently fleshing out the intricacies of what its intent in that part of the world would be.

=== Afghanistan ===
The Soviet Union removed its forces in their entirety from Afghanistan weeks after Bush's inauguration. Bush called the development "the start of a new chapter in the history of Afghanistan" and "extraordinary triumph of spirit and will by the Afghan people" supported by the US. He affirmed that American support for the Afghanistan rebels would continue so long as their efforts were meant to produce "a stable, broadly based government, responsive to the needs of the Afghan people" and called for the resistance to back this principle.

On January 14, 1990, Bush sent a delegation to South Asia as part of an accelerated effort to find a settlement to the Afghanistan war. The decision came as the possibilities of cutting of arms from both superpowers as well as a coalition government and larger role in the United Nations were raised. The following month, Pakistan announced it was withdrawing its support for a military solution in Afghanistan and that it had conveyed to the US that it was not opposed to a solution keeping President Mohammad Najibullah in power. Pakistan National Security Advisor Iqbal Akhund reported the US proposal was not warmly received by the Soviets and he was doubtful the idea could work in part because of the Soviets' insistence that Najibullah remain in power. In May, American and Pakistan officials disclosed the Soviet Union had dropped its insistence that President Najibullah remain in power in a future Afghanistan government while the US had softened to its insistence that Najibullah renounce his claim to the presidency. American officials also stated that while the US and Soviet Union retained major areas of disagreement, "the differences had been narrowed in recent weeks as both sides concluded that elections might be the best way to end the war."

In May 1991, the Bush administration announced it had not renewed funds for the Afghan rebels in its 1992 budget, a policy that had been in place for eleven years. The decision was viewed as a demonstration of "frustration that the Afghan policy is outmoded and hard to defend."

In April 1992, the Bush administration made a public appeal called for the Afghan rebels to act with restraint in attempt to control the capital of Kabul and seize Afghanistan president Najibullah, State Department spokeswoman Margaret Tutwiler requesting "people who are armed, please, in this situation where the leadership has just resigned, stepped down, whether it's in Afghanistan or anywhere else, you have an instant vacuum, you could have chaos, you could have confusion, please do not resort to violence."

=== Israel ===
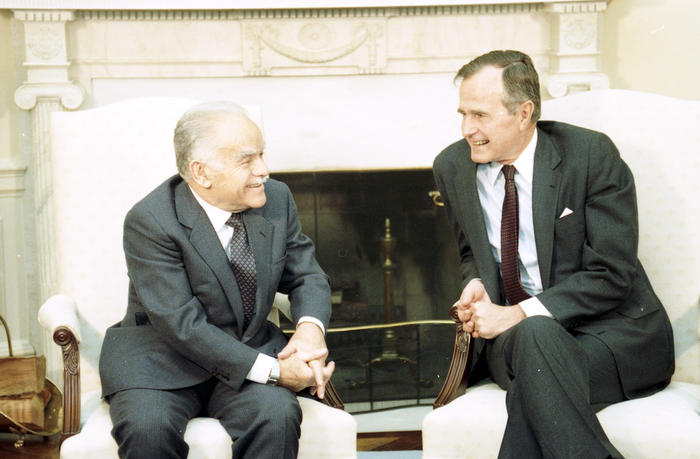
President Bush and Israeli prime minister Yitzak Shamir, 1990

On April 6, 1989, Prime Minister of Israel Yitzhak Shamir was honored at a White House dinner in the State Dining Room. In his remarks, Bush stated his satisfaction with Shamir visiting the US "in the first days of our brand new administration" and American "commitment to the security of Israel remains unshakable" in spite of differences in views on policy occasionally. Bush said the US was aware "a partnership with Israel in peace can work, and we stand ready today to take another step for the cause of peace in the Middle East."

On February 22, 1990, Bush and Shamir engaged in a telephone conversation, Shamir thanking Bush for American support of Jews emigrating from the Soviet Union along with his opposition to antisemitism and support for diplomatic relations being restored. Bush affirmed continued US backing for these policies. During a news conference on March 22, Bush was asked if his comments on East Jerusalem contributed to the Israeli government collapse there. Bush denied his remarks playing a role in the collapse but stated Israel was to decide the leader of their region and expressed his willingness to "negotiate and deal openly with whoever, and talk freely and openly with whoever, emerges as the leader." On June 18, White House Press Secretary Marlin Fitzwater confirmed Bush had sent Shamir a letter in which he congratulated the latter on his election and urged him to support the proposed "Shamir initiative for peace", which would involve the participation of Palestinian Arabians in local elections. On June 20, Bush suspended American dialogue with the Palestine Liberation Organization for the latter's refusal to condemn the Palestinian guerrilla raid of an Israeli beach the previous month.

On January 19, 1991, Iraq launched a second missile attack on Israel, striking Tel Aviv with missiles carrying conventional explosives. Bush administration officials expressed hope that Israel would not retaliate or at least respond so severely as to cause Arabs to leave the coalition against Iraq in the Gulf War. The following day, Bush had two telephone conversations with Shamir, Bush stating the US understood the grief of Israel and pledged the use of "every resource possible to suppress and destroy the mobile Scuds". After Bush met with chief advisors at Camp David, Fitzwater stated it was "quite clear that Iraq launched these missiles against Israel just to split the coalition" and noted they had not been aimed at military targets. In February, Bush met with Israel Defense Minister Moshe Arens at the White House. Arens stated Israel was suffering from the missile strikes and wearing thin in restraining itself form not responding to the attacks, indicating the attacks against Israel had resulted in destruction not "seen in a Western country since World War II." Bush responded by stating the importance of the restraint in the face of the anti-Israel coalition and favored their continuing of this policy. Days later, Israeli ambassador to the United States Zalman Shoval complained of the US not providing 400 million in housing loan guarantees for the purpose of Soviet Jewish immigrant resettlement in Israel along with claiming Israel had not received a cent in compensation for its losses against the Iraqis during the Gulf War. Press Secretary Fitzwater responded to the comments the day after, calling them "outrageous and outside the bounds of acceptable behavior by the ambassador of any friendly country." He stated that Shoval had been contacted by Baker over the matter and Bush had contacted Shamir by cable that morning to protest the remarks.

Relations between the United States and Israel deteriorated by the beginning of 1992. In a March letter to Chairman of the National Jewish Coalition George Klein, Bush wrote "we in the Administration can and need to do better at making this relationship succeed", Klein afterward stating he was pleased with the response, saying the letter "shows his warmth and commitment to the fundamental core relationship between the United States and Israel" while admitting "policy differences between Israel and the United States on the settlements". On August 11, following a meeting between President Bush and Prime Minister Yitzhak Rabin, Bush announced he would seek the approval of Congress to bestow Israel up to $10 billion in loan guarantees to assist the country with its absorbing of Soviet Union immigrants. The following month, the Israeli government released a statement confirming its opposition to the US selling 72 F-15 fighter jets to Saudi Arabia, calling Saudi Arabia "an Arab country at war with Israel" and that the US would be engaged by Israel in hopes of ensuring the latter country's military superiority is preserved.

=== Egypt ===
Bush retained Reagan appointee Frank G. Wisner as United States Ambassador to Egypt during the first two years of his administration.

On January 29, 1991, ahead of a meeting with Foreign Minister of Egypt Ahmed Asmat Abdel-Meguid, Bush stated his "appreciation to the Egyptian Government, specifically to President Hosni Mubarak and to Foreign Minister Meguid, for standing shoulder-to-shoulder with the coalition, leading it in many ways, and for the steadfast position that Egypt has taken in trying to counteract this aggression by Saddam Hussein." On May 9, Bush announced the nomination of Robert H. Pelletreau, Jr. to replace Wisner as US ambassador to Egypt.

=== Israeli–Palestinian conflict ===
During his tenth news conference on April 7, 1989, Bush was asked about his views on the Middle East and if he saw himself becoming involved during his presidency. He stated he would become involved in the event he felt "being immersed in it would help solve the problem of peace in the Middle East" but added that it was "not a time where a lot of high-visibility missions on the part of the President can be helpful in the process." He affirmed that the violence in the West Bank was of concern to the administration and that he had hoped the visits by Israeli Prime Minister Shamir and Egyptian President Mubarak "have moved things forward a little bit."

On June 21, 1990, Bush announced the suspension of American discussions with the Palestine Liberation Organization for the group's failure to condemn a failed Palestinian attack against Israel in addition to its lack of disciplining for the perpetrators. Bush admitted that the order, one he had made at the recommendation of Secretary of State Baker, would likely appease anti-American PLO hardliners that spearheaded the attack and cited this along with the negative effect it would have on peace negotiations as making the move a hard decision to make but insisted discussions between the US and PLO would resume immediately in the event that the PLO condemn the attack and punish the perpetrators.

On January 29, 1991, during a speech to the National Association of Religious Broadcasters, Bush pledged to lead efforts to bring peace to the Middle East following the conclusion of the Gulf War, administration officials saying the president's remarks "were intended to quiet Arab concerns about the mounting destruction in Iraq and to signal that once the fighting ends the United States will try to address the Israeli-Palestinian dispute." On October 19, the US and Soviet Union jointly issued invitations to Israel, neighboring Arabs, and the Palestinians for a Middle East peace conference to be held on October 30 in Madrid. During a news conference on March 13, when asked if he believed Israeli or Palestinian leaders were willing to make concessions on their long-held positions, Bush stated that he believed the US was in a better position "than it has ever been to be a catalyst for peace" and that he was in favor of moving forward.

=== Iran ===
In June 1989, Speaker of the Parliament of Iran Akbar Hashemi Rafsanjani accused the antics of the United States with having prevented improved relations, charging the US with plots and conspiracies. On August 9, Teheran press reports said Iran would aid the Bush administration in freeing American hostages in the event that Iranian assets frozen in the United States since 1979 were released. In response to the story, Press Secretary Marlin Fitzwater stated the position of the Bush administration was "the same as it's always been, that we are not willing to link the Iranian assets question to the hostage question. That fits within the definition of our policy of not trading arms or money or whatever for hostages, of not paying ransom for hostages." On November 7, American officials stated an agreement had been reached for the United States to return 567 million to Iran, as "most of the bank claims were settled over the last several months".

Midway through 1991, after the conclusion of the Gulf War, a number of Iranian officials made comments opposing the US for its role in the conflict. On April 1, Iranian Foreign Ministry spokesman Morteza Sarmadi charged the US with concurrently backing the rebellion and Iraqi government as well as making the situation worse for Iraqis through distributing some "green lights" to Iraq. Later that month, on April 13, President of Iran Hashemi Rafsanjani delivered an address at Teheran University. In it he charged the US with having participated in creating a regional disaster while charging America with being behind Iraqi deaths and the refugee crisis and predicting the US would "eventually be put on trial." On November 28, State Department officials announced the US and Iran had come to an agreement on the compensation of the 278 million to Teheran for undelivered equipment owned by the Iranians and made by Americans prior to the 1979 Islamic revolution. The agreement along with the release of hostages Terry Waite and Thomas Sutherland were noted as being made possible by Iranian concessions and seen as reflections of "Teheran's eagerness to put these issues behind it and win acceptance by the West."

=== Syria ===
By the start of Bush's presidency, relations between the United States and Syria had been strained by the US suspecting Syria of involvement in various terrorist activities throughout the 1980s, including 1988 bombing of Pan American World Airways Flight 103, the bombings of the American Embassy and the 1983 United States Marine barracks in Beirut. Syria had also been on the State Department's list of countries which sponsor terrorism.

In November 1990, Bush met with President of Syria Hafez al-Assad in Geneva, the White House releasing a written statement saying the two had discussed the Gulf War and agreed in preference for a peaceful solution to the conflict. This was the first time a U.S. president had met with the Syrian leader since Assad's meeting with Jimmy Carter in 1977. The meeting was seen as a demonstration of Bush's anxiety about the Gulf War and "politically risky".

In January 1991, Baker met with Assad for the purpose of maintaining Arab solidarity in the Gulf War, the meeting being followed by a news conference held by Syrian foreign minister Farouk al-Sharaa who stated Israel should not interfere, comments that were seen as indicating Syria would either switch sides or leave the coalition. A senior American official stated the Baker-Assad meeting had shown Syria's willingness to engage in offensive operations against Iraq, a change in policy from its prior stance. Three months later, in April, Baker and Assad met again amid the Syrian government demanding Israel both withdraw from occupied territories and respect Palestinian rights.

=== Saudi Arabia ===
In August 1990, Bush ordered American troops into Saudi Arabia, citing Iraq as posing an imminent threat to the region. The coalition of troops was assembled following Bush being given final permission by King Fahd. Press Secretary Fitzwater said the US had obtained information confirming the presence of offensive Iraqi forces in Saudi Arabia and the imminent threat claim of the administration was validated by the position and location of the Iraqi forces. While the number of troops was considered too small to conduct a war against the Iraqi forces, "it appeared sufficient to give the Saudi Government the military and political backing that King Fahd needed to resist pressures to support a fellow Arab leader." The choice was also seen as the riskiest move of Bush's tenure as President "by sending American soldiers to a region that has proven a quagmire" for his predecessors.

== NAFTA ==
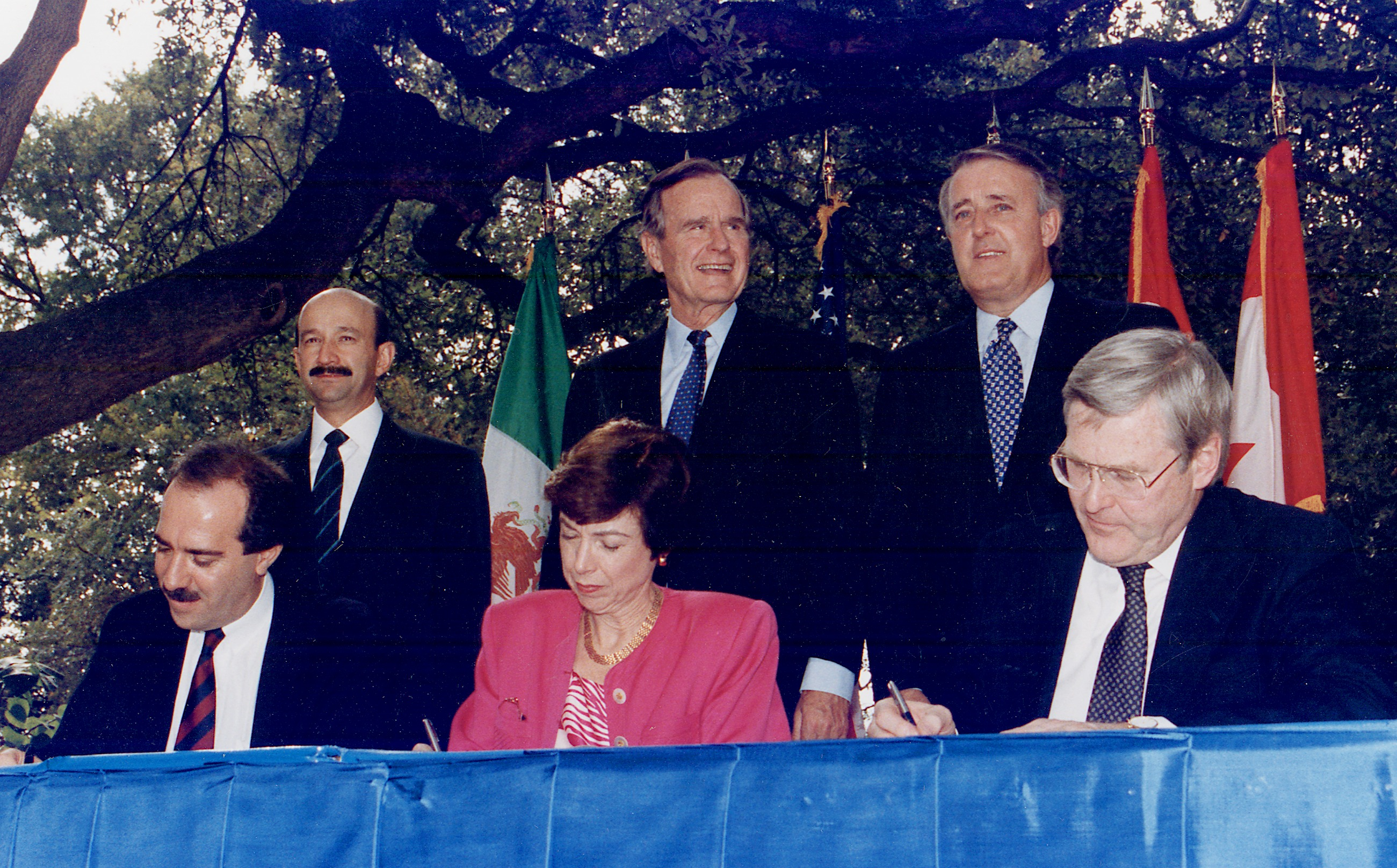
(standing) President Carlos Salinas, President Bush, Prime Minister Brian Mulroney; (seated) Jaime Serra Puche, Carla Hills, and Michael Wilson at the NAFTA Initialing Ceremony, October 1992

The Bush administration and the Progressive Conservative Prime Minister of Canada Brian Mulroney spearheaded the negotiations of the North American Free Trade Agreement (NAFTA). The agreement would eliminate the majority of tariffs on products that were traded among the United States, Canada, and Mexico. This would encourage trade among the countries. The treaty also restricted patents, copyrights, and trademarks, and outlined the removal of investment restrictions among the three countries.

President Bush announced the completion of NAFTA during a Rose Garden appearance on August 12, 1992, calling it the "beginning of a new era".

The agreement came under heavy scrutiny from union-connected Democrats, who charged that NAFTA resulted in a loss of American jobs. NAFTA also contained no provisions for labor rights; according to the Bush administration, the trade agreement would generate economic resources necessary to enable Mexico's government to overcome problems of funding and enforcement of its labor laws. Bush needed a renewal of negotiating authority to move forward with the NAFTA trade talks. Such authority would enable the president to negotiate a trade accord that would be submitted to Congress for a vote, thereby avoiding a situation in which the president would be required to renegotiate with trading partners those parts of an agreement that Congress wished to change. While initial signing was possible during his term, negotiations made slow, but steady, progress. President Clinton would go on to make the passage of NAFTA a priority for his administration, despite its conservative and Republican roots—with the addition of two side agreements—to achieve its passage in 1993.

The treaty has since been defended as well as criticized further. The American economy has grown 54% since the adoption of NAFTA in 1993, with 25 million new jobs created; this was seen by some as evidence of NAFTA being beneficial to the United States. With talk in early 2008 regarding a possible American withdrawal from the treaty, Carlos M. Gutierrez, United States Secretary of Commerce, writes, "Quitting NAFTA would send economic shock waves throughout the world, and the damage would start here at home." But John J. Sweeney, President of the AFL-CIO, wrote in The Boston Globe that "the U.S. trade deficit with Canada and Mexico ballooned to 12 times its pre-NAFTA size, reaching $111 billion in 2004."

== Biological weapons ==
During the 1988 campaign, Bush advocated for the United States taking a leading role in punishing countries using either biological or chemical weapons, saying countries using them "must know that continued violation of the ban against the use of such weapons carries a heavy penalty."

On May 22, 1990, Bush signed the Biological Weapons Anti-Terrorism Act of 1989 into law, Bush saying in a statement that the legislation would impose "new criminal penalties against those who would employ or contribute to the dangerous proliferation of biological weapons" along with validating American efforts against their usage and called the Act a "measured but important step" in achieving a cessation of threat from proliferation of biological weapons.

== Evaluations ==
According to Roger Harrison in reviewing Sparrow's biography of Scowcroft:

What the Bush administration achieved in its four years, as Sparrow reminds us, is perhaps without parallel in any similar period of our history: the peaceful demise of the Soviet Union and the emergence of independent states from what had been its empire, the reunification of Germany and its integration within NATO, and the creation of a broad coalition that expelled Iraqi forces from Kuwait and crippled Iraq as a disruptive force in the Middle East. None of this was preordained, and much might have gone wrong without the adept diplomacy and level-headed policy of President Bush and his aides.

David Rothkopf argues:

In the recent history of U.S. foreign policy, there has been no president, nor any president's team, who, when confronted with profound international change and challenges, responded with such a thoughtful and well-managed foreign policy....[the Bush administration was] a bridge over one of the great fault lines of history [that] ushered in a ‘new world order’ it described with great skill and professionalism.”

Michael Beschloss and Strobe Talbott praise Bush's handling of the USSR, especially how he prodded Gorbachev in terms of releasing control over the satellites and permitting German unification—and especially a united Germany in NATO. However Bush had an exaggerated view of Gorbachev as the best leader of a new Russia, and missed the more important role of Boris Yeltsin as the true spokesman for public opinion in Russia in its disdain for Gorbachev and his unyielding devotion to Communism.

Andrew Bacevich judges the Bush administration was “morally obtuse” in the light of its “business-as-usual” attitude towards China after the massacre in Tiananmen Square and the uncritical support of Gorbachev as the Soviet Union disintegrated.

Neoconservative commentator John Podhoretz, calling on Bush's son to invade Iraq, says:

Bush the Elder was the most unimaginative president of the second half of the 20th century, and his senior advisers were among the most mediocre ever to staff an administration. Even their most impressive accomplishment, the Persian Gulf War, was a triumph of the most literal nature: They used overpowering force to accomplish a narrow aim and displayed shockingly poor foresight about what it would mean to leave Saddam Hussein in power in Iraq afterward.

== International trips ==
Countries visited by President Bush during his time in office

The number of visits per country where he travelled are:

- One visit to Argentina, Australia, Chile, China, Colombia, Costa Rica, Czechoslovakia, Egypt, Greece, Hungary, Malta, Martinique, Mexico, Panama, Russia, Saint Martin, Singapore, Somalia, Soviet Union, Spain, Switzerland, Turkey, Uruguay and Venezuela
- Two visits to Belgium, Bermuda, Brazil, Finland, Italy, Japan, Netherlands, Poland, South Korea and Vatican City
- Three visits to Germany, Saudi Arabia and the United Kingdom
- Four visits to Canada and France

== See also ==
- International relations since 1989
- Timeline of United States diplomatic history
