= Marie Chatardová =

Czech diplomat

Her Excellency Marie Chatardová
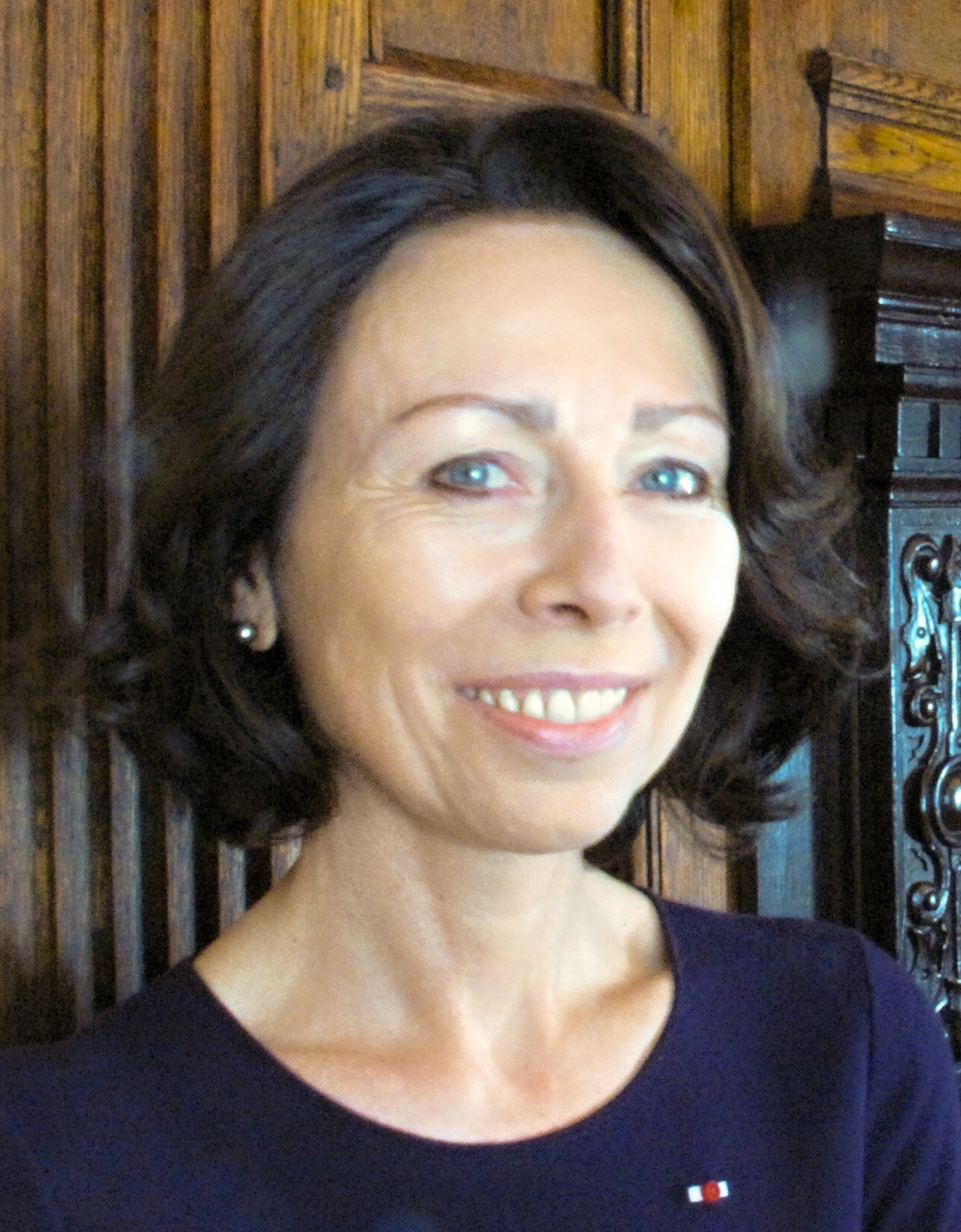

Personal details
- Born: 6 March 1963 (age 63) Znojmo, Czechoslovakia
- Spouse: Benoît E. Chatard
- Children: 3
- Education: Doctor of Law (JUDr.)
- Alma mater: Masaryk University
- Awards: Commander of the Legion of Honor (2016); Officer of the Order of Saint Charles (2016)

Marie Chatardová (born 6 March 1963) is a Czech diplomat who has served in a number of ambassador posts during her career. In 2017, Forbes magazine named Chatardová as the fourth most influential woman in the Czech Republic.

== Early life and education ==
Chatardová was born in Znojmo, in the South Moravian Region of Czechoslovakia. Her family comes from around the village of Mramotice. She moved to Brno aged 10 and studied at Gymnázium Křenová. In 1985, she qualified as a Doctor of Law from the Faculty of Law at Masaryk University in Brno. In 1992, she joined the Chamber of Commercial Lawyers.

== Professional career ==
From 1985 to 1990, Marie Chatardová was employed at the Trademarks Office in Prague. After the Velvet Revolution, she became a lawyer, specializing in Business Law.

In 1994, she entered the Czech Ministry of Foreign Affairs and worked for one year at the Department of Analysis and Planning. She was then sent to the Czech Permanent Mission to the European Union in Brussels, in charge of the Justice and Home Affairs Agenda before Czech accession to the EU. In 1999, she came back to Prague and served as Head of Unit within the Department of the Coordination of EU Relations. In 2000, she was appointed as Director of the Department of Strategic Communication at the Ministry of Foreign Affairs.

From 2002 to 2007, Chatardová was the Czech ambassador to Sweden. After this, she returned to the Czech Republic to become Director of the Department of Protocol at the Ministry of Foreign Affairs, from 2007 to 2010.

From 2010 to 2016, Chatardová was the Czech ambassador to France and Monaco, and the Permanent Delegate of the Czech Republic to the International Organisation of La Francophonie. In 2013, she became the Permanent Delegate of the Czech Republic to UNESCO (2013-2016), and was elected as Chair of the organization's Committee on Conventions and Recommendations (2013-2015).

In 2016, she was appointed as the Permanent Representative of the Czech Republic to the United Nations. In July 2017, she was elected as the 73rd President of the Economic and Social Council of the United Nations (ECOSOC).

Between 2021 and 2025, Chatardová was the Czech ambassador to the United Kingdom, the first woman to hold the post in the history of Czechoslovakia and the Czech Republic. Alongside her diplomatic duties, she promoted the legacy of Czech soldiers in the United Kingdom during the Second World War through the series Children of Heroes, which features 60 interviews with their descendants. In recognition of this work, the Czech Ministry of Defence awarded her the Honorary Commemorative Badge for Services to War Veterans (2026).

She served as special envoy for relations with Francophone countries from September to December 2025.

On 15 December 2025, she was appointed Deputy Minister at the Czech Ministry of Foreign Affairs.

== Teaching ==
Chatardová has also held teaching positions at the Faculty of Social Sciences of Charles University (Institute of Western European studies), Anglo-American University (School of International Relations and Diplomacy), the Institute of Public Administration in Prague, and the Diplomatic Academy in Prague.

== Personal life ==
Chatardová is married to Benoît E. Chatard. They have three children.

== Honours ==
- Commander of the National Order of the Legion of Honour (France; 2016)
- Officer of the Order of Saint-Charles (Monaco; 2016)
