= President of the United Nations Economic and Social Council =

- Emblem of the United Nations

- Flag of the United Nations

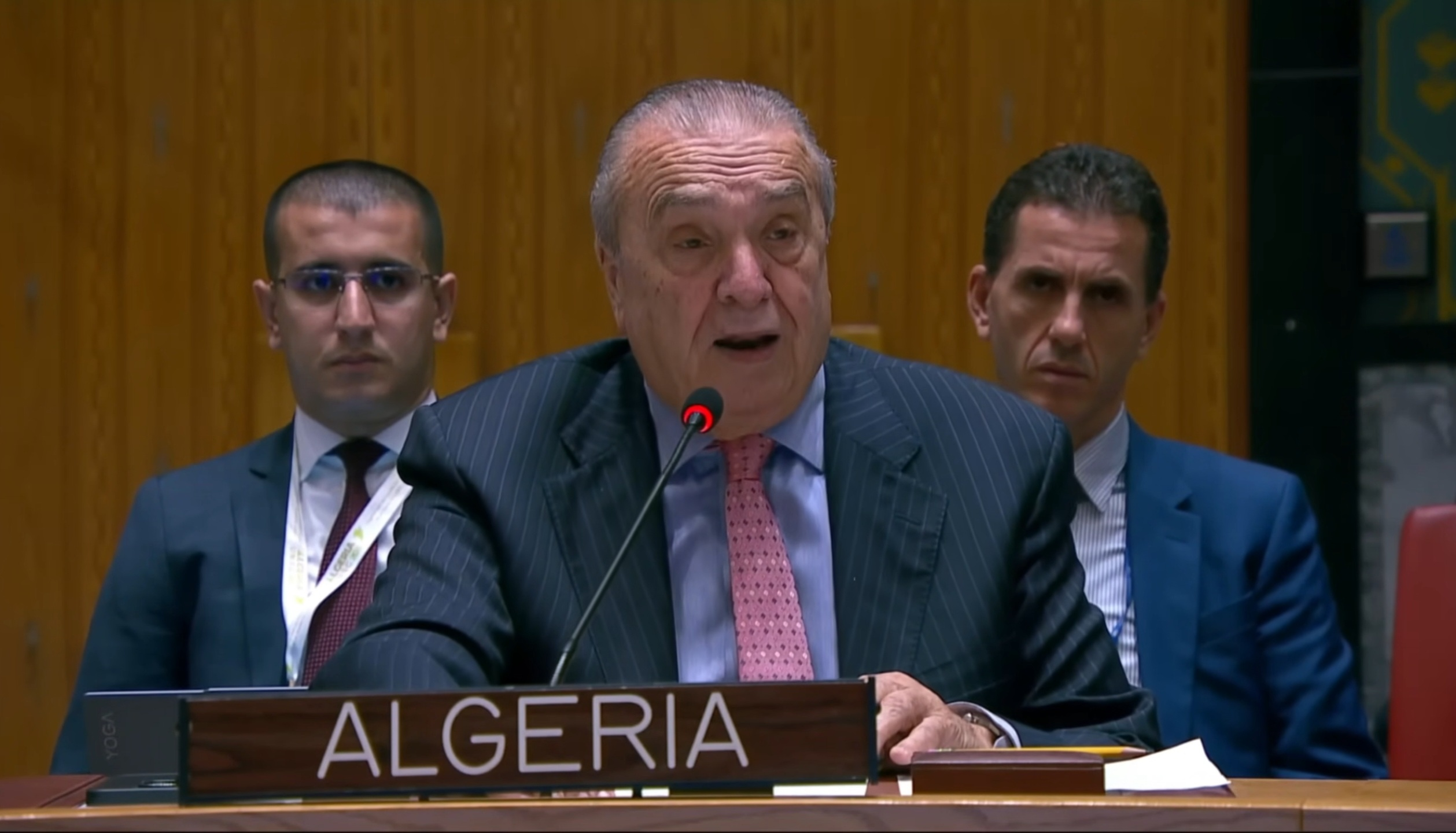
- Incumbent (Algeria) Amar Bendjama since 31 July 2026
- Style: His Excellency
- Seat: United Nations Headquarters; New York City, United States
- Appointer: United Nations Economic and Social Council
- Term length: One year
- Constituting instrument: Charter of the United Nations
- Inaugural holder: Arcot Ramasamy Mudaliar
- Formation: 1946
- Website: ecosoc.un.org/en/about-us/president

The president of the United Nations Economic and Social Council is the presiding officer of that body.

The position voted for by members of the United Nations Economic and Social Council (ECOSOC) on a yearly basis.

== Election ==
The Economic and Social Council elects a new bureau, a president and four vice-presidents, at the first meeting of the new session of the council, typically in July. These officials are chosen at large from among the representatives of the council's members for one-year terms. Members of bureau hold office until their successors are elected by the council at the next session.

According to the rules of procedure of the council, the election of members to the bureau includes special regard for equitable geographic rotation among the United Nations regional groups. For instance, the presidency of the council rotates between the five regions, and along with it the vice-presidencies.

== Role ==
The role of president of the council involves opening and closing meetings of the body, presiding over the proceedings of the council, steering the work of the body, maintaining order and ensuring observance of the rules of procedure at all times, and, if need be, calling emergency sessions of the body. The president also usually speaks to the press on behalf of the council.

== List of presidents ==
The following is a list of all presidents of the Economic and Social Council since its inception:

Year elected	Name of President	UN member state	Session(s)
1946	Arcot Ramasamy Mudaliar	British India	First and Second
1946	Andrija Štampar	Yugoslavia	Third
1947	Arcot Ramasamy Mudaliar	India	Fourth
1947	Ján Papánek	Czechoslovakia	Fifth
1948	Charles Habib Malik	Lebanon	
1949	Jim Thorn	New Zealand	
1950 - 1951	Hernan Santa Cruz	Chile	
1952	Syed Amjad Ali	Pakistan	
1953	Raymond Scheyven	Belgium	
1954	Juan I. Cooke	Argentina	
1956	Douglas Copland	Australia	
1956	Hans Engen	Norway	
1957	Mohammad Mir Khan	Pakistan	
1958	George F. Davidson	Canada	
1959	Daniel Cosío Villegas	Mexico	
1960	C. W. A. Schurmann	Netherlands	
1961	Foss Shanahan	New Zealand	
1962	Jerzy Michalowski	Poland	
1963	Alfonso Patino	Colombia	
1964	Ronald Walker	Australia	
1965	Akira Matsui	Japan	
1966	Tewfik Bouattoura	Algeria	
1967	Milan Klusák	Czechoslovakia	
1968	Manuel Perez Guerrero	Venezuela	
1969	Raymond Scheyven	Belgium	
1970	J. B. P. Maramis	Indonesia	
1971	Rachid Driss	Tunisia	
1972	Karoly Szarka	Hungary	
1973	Sergio Armando Frazao	Brazil	
1974	Aarno Karhilo	Finland	
1975	Iqbal A. Akhund	Pakistan	
1976	Simeon Aké	Ivory Coast	
1977	Ladislav Šmíd	Czechoslovakia	
1978	Donald O. Mills	Jamaica	
1979	Hugo Scheltema	Netherlands	
1980	Andreas V. Mavrommatis	Cyprus	
1981	Paul John Firmino Lusaka	Zambia	
1982	Miljan Komatina	Yugoslavia	
1983	Sergio Correa da Costa	Brazil	
1984	Karl Fischer	Austria	
1985	Tomohiko Kabayashi	Japan	
1986	Manuel dos Santos	Mozambique	
1987	Eugeniusz Noworyta	Poland	
1988	Andres Aguilar	Venezuela	
1989	Kjeld Vilhelm Mortensen	Denmark	
1990	Chinmaya Rajaninath Gharekhan	India	
1992 (Note: Elected in January)	Darko Šilović	Yugoslavia	
1992 (Note: Elected in June)	Robert Mroziewicz	Poland	
1993	Juan Somavia	Chile	
1994	Richard William Butler	Australia	
1995	Ahmad Kamal	Pakistan	
1996	Jean-Marie Kacou Gervais	Côte d'Ivoire	
1997	Karel Kovanda	Czech Republic	
1998	Juan Somavia	Chile	
1999	Paulo Fulci	Italy	
2000	Makarim Wibisono	Indonesia	
2001	Martin Belinga-Eboutou	Cameroon	
2002	Ivan Šimonović	Croatia	
2003	Gert Rosenthal	Guatemala	
2004	Marjatta Rasi	Finland	
2005	Munir Akram	Pakistan	
2006	Ali Hachani	Tunisia	
2007	Dalius Čekuolis	Lithuania	
2008	Léo Mérorès	Haiti	
2009	Sylvie Lucas	Luxembourg	
2010	Hamidon Ali	Malaysia	
2011	Lazarous Kapambwe	Zambia	
2012	Miloš Koterec	Slovakia	
2013	Néstor Osorio Londoño	Colombia	
2014	Martin Sajdik	Austria	
2015	Oh Joon	Republic of Korea	
2016	Frederick Musiiwa Makamure Shava	Zimbabwe	
2017	Marie Chatardová	Czech Republic	
2018	Inga Rhonda King	Saint Vincent	
2019	Mona Juul	Norway	
2020	Munir Akram	Pakistan	
2021	Collen Vixen Kelapile	Botswana	
2022	Lachezara Stoeva	Bulgaria	
2023	Paula Narváez	Chile	
2024	Bob Rae	Canada	
2025	Lok Bahadur Thapa	Nepal	
2026	Amar Bendjama	Algeria	

== See also ==
- President of the United Nations General Assembly
- President of the United Nations Security Council
