= Iqbal Akhund =

Pakistani diplomat and writer (1924-2020)

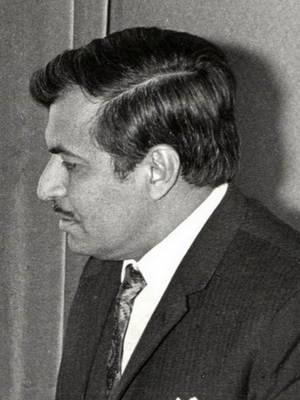

5th National Security Advisor
- In office 4 December 1988 – 6 August 1990
- Prime Minister: Benazir Bhutto

Chairperson of the Group of 77
- In office 1976–1977

30th President of the United Nations Economic and Social Council
- In office 1975–1975

Permanent Representative of Pakistan to the United Nations
- In office 1972–1978

Personal details
- Born: 21 August 1924 Hyderabad Sindh, British India
- Died: 3 June 2020

Iqbal Ahmad Akhund (Sindhi: اقبال احمد آخوند; Urdu: اقبال احمد آخوند; born 21 August 1924, died 3 June 2020) was a Pakistani diplomat and writer who served as the 7th permanent representative of Pakistan to the United Nations from 1972 to 1978 and the 5th national security advisor to the 11th prime minister of Pakistan, Benazir Bhutto for foreign affairs and national security. He also served as chairperson of the Group of 77 (G77) from 1976 to 1977.

A head of the United Nations Centre Against Apartheid, Akhund also served as a Special Representative of the Secretary-General and United Nations Assistant Secretary-General from 1979 to 1987.

== Early life ==
Akhund was born in Hyderabad, Sindh Province. His father was a sessions judge in British Indian government and retired in the mid-1950s as a chief justice of Khairpur. In 1945, Akhund obtained his master's degree in economics and political science at Karachi. Later on his family left Hyderabad and settled in Karachi.

== Career ==
Akhund joined the foreign services after completing his civil services in 1948. He was appointed at various posts during his career such as permanent representative to the United Nations, assistant secretary-general at the United Nations, the president of the Security Council, and president of the United Nations Economic and Social Council. After retiring from foreign services, he was appointed as the national security advisor in the government of Benazir Bhutto from 1988 to 1990.

Before serving at the UN, he served as ambassador of Pakistan to Egypt, Yugoslavia and France. Prior to his retirement from foreign services on security, he was appointed as United Nations Resident Coordinator in Lebanon, and chairperson of the Security Council Committee on Sanctions against Rhodesia, a part of the United Nations Security Council.

== Publications ==
- Akhund, I. (2017). Of Pearls and Pecks of Straw: Recollections, Essays, After-thoughts. Oxford University Press. ISBN 978-0-19-940761-3.
- Akhund, I.; Riyāz̤, F. (2001). Benaẓīr Ḥukūmat: Pahlā Daur : Kyā Khoyā, Kyā Pāyā? (in Latvian). Oxford University Press. ISBN 978-0-19-579421-2.
- Akhund, I. (2000). Trial and Error: The Advent and Eclipse of Benazir Bhutto. Oxford University Press. ISBN 978-0-19-579160-0.
- Akhund, I. (1998). Memoirs of a Bystander: A Life in Diplomacy. Oxford Pakistan paperbacks. Oxford University Press. ISBN 978-0-19-577997-4.
- Akhund, I.; Aspen Institute for Humanistic Studies (1983). On Revitalizing the International Order. Wye paper. Aspen Institute for Humanistic Studies. ISBN 978-0-89843-051-6.
- Akhund, I. (1979). Two Interviews on Pakistan's Nuclear Programme. Directorate of Films and Publications, Ministry of Information and Broadcasting, Government of Pakistan.
