= Hurting the feelings of the Chinese people =

Chinese Communist Party political slogan

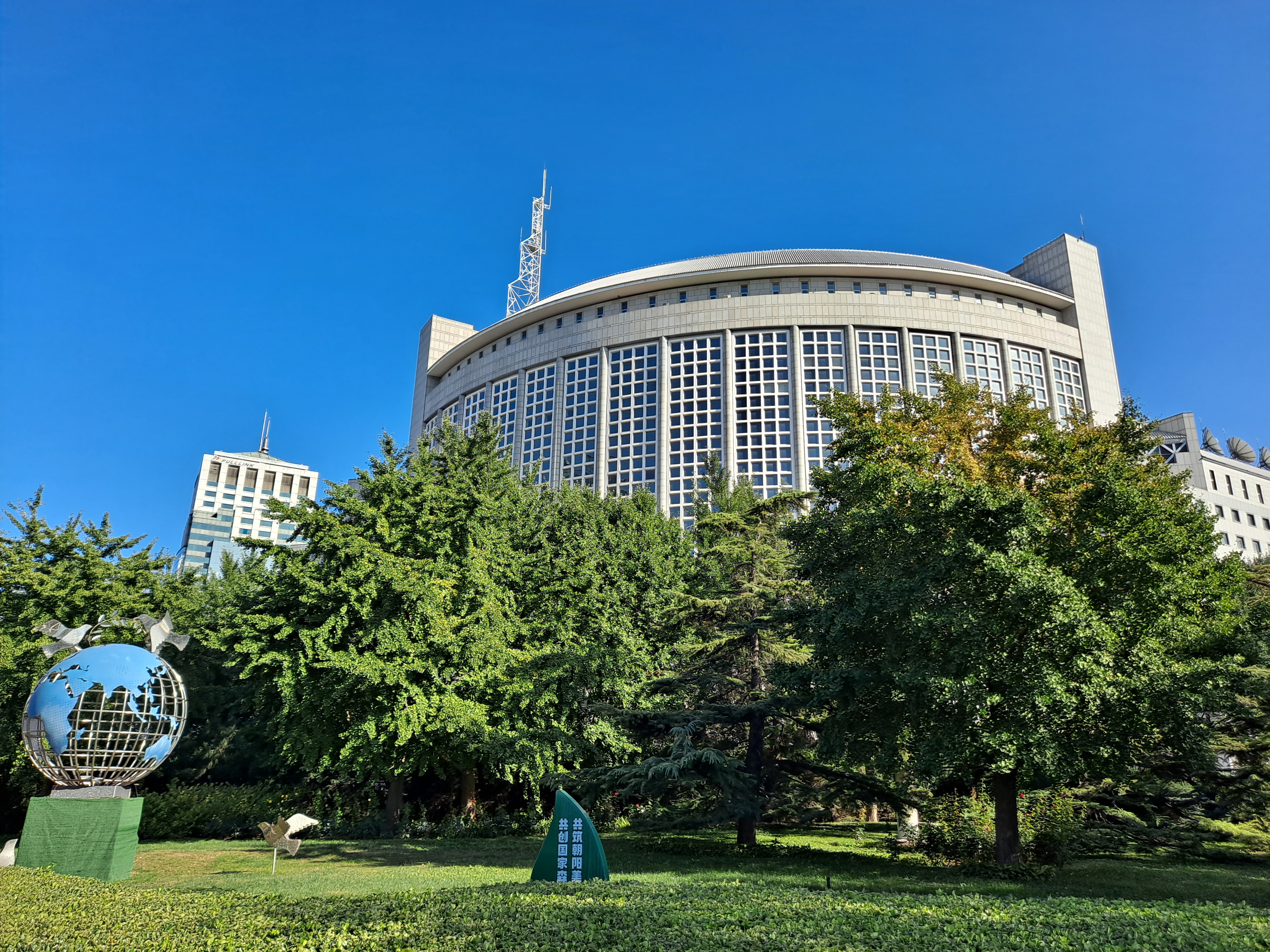
Headquarters building of the Chinese Ministry of Foreign Affairs in Chaoyang District, Beijing

"Hurting the feelings of the Chinese people" (simplified Chinese: 伤害中国人民的感情; traditional Chinese: 傷害中國人民的感情; pinyin: shānghài Zhōngguó rénmín de gǎnqíng) is a phrase used by the Ministry of Foreign Affairs of China, in addition to Chinese state media organisations and Chinese Communist Party–affiliated news outlets such as the People's Daily, the China Daily and Xinhua News Agency to condemn the words, actions or policies of a person, organisation, or government that are perceived to be of an adversarial nature towards China through an argumentum ad populum position. Alternative forms of the phrase include "hurting the feelings of 1.4 billion people" (Note: The exact number mentioned also varies between 1.2 billion and 1.3 billion.) (simplified Chinese: 伤害14亿人民感情; traditional Chinese: 傷害14億人民感情) and "hurting the feelings of the Chinese nation" (simplified Chinese: 伤害中华民族的感情; traditional Chinese: 傷害中華民族的感情).

== Origin ==
The phrase first appeared in 1959 in the People's Daily, the official newspaper of the Central Committee of the Chinese Communist Party, where it was used to criticise India during a border dispute. In the decades that followed, the phrase has been regularly used to express displeasure of the Chinese government via its various official communication channels. Targets accused of having "hurt the feelings of the Chinese people" range from national governments and international organisations, to companies such as automakers, newspapers, luxury jewellers, and hotel chains, in addition to outspoken individuals including sportspeople, business executives, film actors, and music performers. Ordinary people have also become encouraged to use the expression.

In September 2023, an amendment to the Law on Penalties for Administration of Public Security was proposed before the National People's Congress that would criminalize comments, clothing, or symbols that hurt the feelings of the Chinese people. After public backlash, the amendment was narrowed to prohibiting clothes that "glorify wars of aggression or aggressive acts"; the amendment took effect in June 2025.

== Phraseology ==
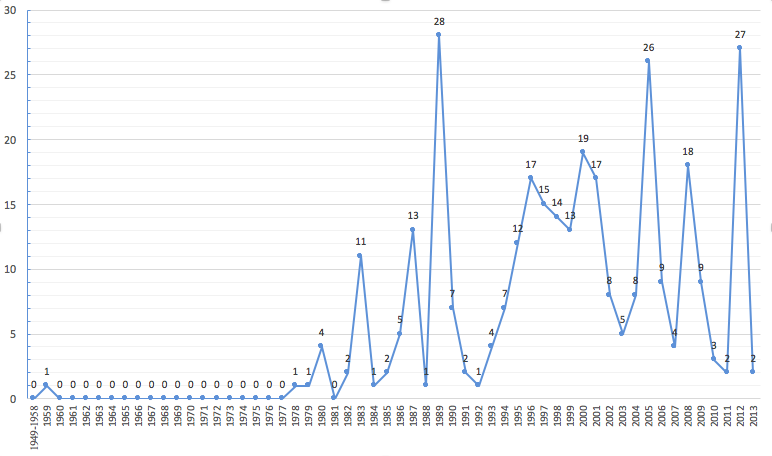
The occurrence of "hurt the feelings of the Chinese people" within the People's Daily by each year

A study conducted by David Bandurski as part of the China Media Project at the University of Hong Kong selected 143 text samples of the phrase from excerpts from the People's Daily published between 1959 and 2015; from this sample, Japan was most frequently accused of "hurting the feelings of the Chinese people" with 51 occurrences, while the United States ranked second at 35 occurrences. In terms of specific issues which drew condemnation through the catchphrase, 28 were in relation to the political status of Taiwan, while the Tibetan sovereignty debate drew condemnation with the phrase 12 times. Bandurski later wrote in 2019 that the phrase appears around at most four times in the People's Daily each year, though there was a slight uptick in 2012.

A December 2008 Time article used an informal statistical survey to analyse the occurrence of the phrase within People's Daily publications, pointing out that during the period between 1946 and 2006 there were more than one hundred articles that made accusations against a target that had "hurt the feelings of the Chinese people".

Victor H. Mair wrote in 2011 that while the phrase "hurt the feelings of the Chinese people" resulted in 17,000 online hits, rewriting the phrase as "hurt the feelings of the Japanese people" only yields 178 hits, and the same phrase rewritten with 17 other nationalities provides zero hits. In addition, use of the keywords "bullying" (Chinese: 欺负) and "looking down upon" (Chinese: 看不起) results in 623,000 Google hits for "bullying China", and 521,000 hits for "looking down upon Chinese people".

Horng-luen Wang (Chinese: 汪宏倫; pinyin: Wāng Hónglún), an associate researcher at the Institute of Sociology at Academia Sinica in Taiwan, found that there were 319 instances of the phrase "hurt the feelings of the Chinese people" in the People's Daily from 1949 to 2013, based on data obtained from the People's Daily database.

== Criticism ==
In August 2016, Merriden Varrall, Director of the East Asia Program at the Lowy Institute in Sydney, Australia, published an opinion piece in The New York Times titled "A Chinese Threat to Australian Openness" in which she claimed that many of the 150,000 Chinese international students in Australia attempted to stifle debate in the classroom that did not match the official viewpoint of the Chinese government; later in September 2016, another opinion piece by Varrall in The Guardian asserted that while Chinese students in Australia would frequently use the phrase "hurt the feelings of the Chinese people" whenever China received international criticism, such phrasing is only ever used within the context of China and would never be used by those of other nationalities, such as Australians, to condemn criticism of their own countries.

A February 2016 piece in The Economist commented that the supposed outrage of the people is often utilised as a tool to allow the Chinese Communist Party to abandon its official diplomatic principle of non-interference in the internal affairs of other countries; for instance, when China releases official statements claiming that the visits of Japanese politicians to Yasukuni Shrine hurt the feelings of the Chinese people, it is able to express dissatisfaction towards the visits on behalf of the people rather than as an official government statement or position.

== Historical events ==
=== United States ===
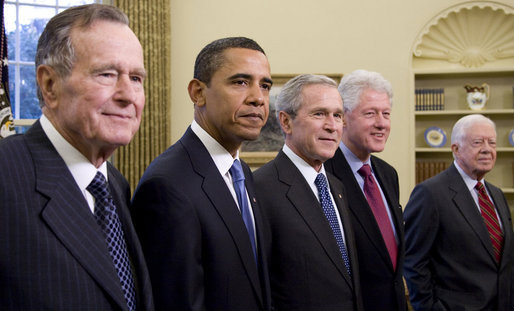
Centre, from left to right: George H. W. Bush, Barack Obama, George W. Bush, Bill Clinton, Jimmy Carter.

In August 1980, Xinhua News Agency accused US presidential candidate Ronald Reagan of having "deeply hurt the feelings of the 1 billion Chinese people" and "given rise to widespread concern and indignation in China" after Reagan suggested that the United States should open a governmental liaison office in Taiwan. An April 9, 1983 article in the People's Daily argued that the United States had "made a whole series of moves that hurt the Chinese people's dignity, feelings, and interests", in reference to US military arms sales to Taiwan, the status of Taiwan in the Asian Development Bank, and the defection of Chinese tennis player Hu Na to the United States.

Following the 1989 Tiananmen Square protests and massacre, US congressional actions targeting the Chinese government more than doubled, and in response, the Chinese assistant foreign minister expressed to the US ambassador that the new bills "attacked China and interfered in its internal affairs", and that "such activities by the US Congress hurt the feelings of the 1.1 billion Chinese people".

After the Hainan Island incident in 2001, where a United States Navy signals intelligence aircraft collided with a People's Liberation Army Navy interceptor, Chinese government representatives rejected the United States' request to repair the American aircraft on Chinese soil and have it fly back to base, instead insisting that the plane be dismantled and returned to the US; they stated that allowing the aircraft to fly back after being repaired in China would "hurt the feelings of the Chinese people".

United States presidents Bill Clinton, George W. Bush and Barack Obama have all been accused by Chinese foreign ministry spokespersons and foreign ministers of "hurting the feelings of the Chinese people" in relation to their respective meetings with the 14th Dalai Lama.

=== Japan ===
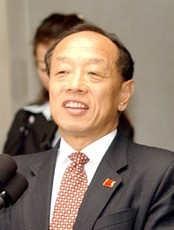
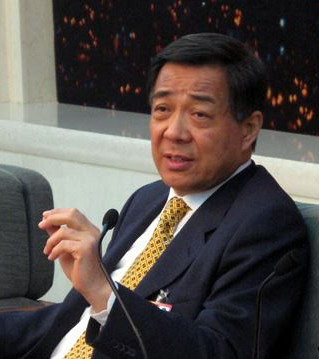
Chinese foreign minister Li Zhaoxing (2003–2007) and commerce minister Bo Xilai (2004–2007)

Following Japanese prime minister Yasuhiro Nakasone's visit to Yasukuni Shrine in 1985, the People's Daily wrote that the visit "hurt the feelings of both Chinese and Japanese peoples who were victims of Japanese militarism". Prime minister Junichiro Koizumi's regular visits to Yasukuni Shrine from 2001 to 2006 were likewise criticised by Chinese foreign ministry spokeswoman Zhang Qiyue (Chinese: 章啟月) as having "hurt the feelings of the Chinese people and the people of the majority of victimized countries in Asia", by Chinese foreign minister Li Zhaoxing as having "hurt the feelings of the Chinese people" as he blamed the visits for anti-Japan protests in China, and by Chinese commerce minister Bo Xilai as "severely hurting the Chinese people's feelings and damaging the political foundation for bilateral ties".

On September 15, 2012, after the Japanese government nationalised control over three of the privately owned islands within the Senkaku Islands, the Xinhua News Agency stated that the move "hurt the feelings of 1.3 billion Chinese people".

In January 2026, during the 2025–2026 China–Japan diplomatic crisis, China's foreign ministry stated that Japanese prime minister Sanae Takaichi's remarks about Taiwan had "severely hurt the feelings of the Chinese people."

=== Holy See ===
On October 1, 2000, Pope John Paul II canonised 120 missionaries and adherents who died in China during the Qing dynasty and the Republican era; in response, the People's Daily expressed that the move "greatly hurt the feelings of the Chinese race and is a serious provocation to the 1.2 billion people of China". The Chinese Ministry of Foreign Affairs issued a statement stating that the Vatican "seriously hurt the feelings of the Chinese people and the dignity of the Chinese nation".

In 2005, the CCP-affiliated Catholic Patriotic Association stated that the attendance of president of Taiwan Chen Shui-bian at Pope John Paul II's funeral "hurt the feelings of the Chinese people, including five million Catholics".

=== Europe ===
On September 24, 2007, Chinese foreign ministry spokesperson Jiang Yu expressed that German chancellor Angela Merkel's meeting with the 14th Dalai Lama "hurt the feelings of the Chinese people and seriously undermined China-Germany relations". The 14th Dalai Lama's later meeting with French president Nicolas Sarkozy in December 2008 drew similar criticisms, with the Chinese Ministry of Foreign Affairs releasing a press statement insisting that Sarkozy's actions "constitute gross interference in China's internal affairs and offend the feelings of the Chinese people"; Xinhua News Agency likewise condemned Sarkozy's meeting as "not only hurting the feelings of the Chinese people, but also undermining Sino-French relations". British prime minister David Cameron's 2012 meeting with the 14th Dalai Lama also received identical accusations of hurt feelings.

On October 23, 2008, the European Parliament awarded the 2008 Sakharov Prize to social activist Hu Jia. Prior to the announcement, China had put extensive pressure on the European Parliament to prevent Hu Jia from winning the award, with Chinese Ambassador to the European Union Song Zhe writing a warning letter to the President of the European Parliament stating that should Hu Jia receive the prize, it would seriously damage Sino-European relations and "hurt the feelings of the Chinese people".

=== Canada ===
On October 29, 2007, Canadian prime minister Stephen Harper met with the 14th Dalai Lama; in response, Chinese foreign ministry spokesman Liu Jianchao stated in a news briefing that Harper's "disgusting conduct has seriously hurt the feelings of the Chinese people and undermined Sino-Canadian relations".

Following the arrest of Huawei chief financial officer Meng Wanzhou in Canada in December 2018, Xinhua News Agency accused Canada of assisting American hegemony, an act which "hurt the feelings of the Chinese people".

=== Mexico ===
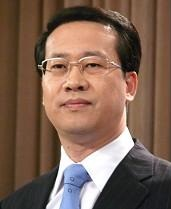
Chinese foreign ministry spokesperson Ma Zhaoxu

On September 9, 2011, president of Mexico Felipe Calderón met with the 14th Dalai Lama; the following day, Chinese foreign ministry spokesperson Ma Zhaoxu made an official statement that the meeting "hurt the feelings of the Chinese people".

=== Hong Kong ===
On October 13, 2016, the Government of Hong Kong condemned opposition lawmakers Leung Chung-hang and Yau Wai-ching as having "harmed the feelings of our compatriots" in a written statement, following allegations that they intentionally pronounced the word "China" as "Chee-na", (Note: Hong Kong Government Cantonese Romanisation uses the same "ch" letter combination to represent both aspirated chʼ and unaspirated ch, and omits the diacritics. English readers may find this spelling confusing and mispronounce the sounds. Yale romanization of Cantonese, on the other hand, uses different letters to represent these two sounds. The Yale Romanization for these two characters is "ji1 na5". To enable English readers to produce a pronunciation closest to the Cantonese, spelling it as "Jee-na" would be more appropriate.) the Cantonese pronunciation of the Japanese ethnic slur Shina, during their swearing-in ceremony; Xinhua News Agency reported that a representative of the Hong Kong Liaison Office made an official statement condemning the act as "challenging the nation's dignity and severely hurting the feelings of all Chinese people and overseas Chinese, including Hong Kong compatriots".

On August 3, 2019, during the 2019–2020 Hong Kong protests, an unknown protester lowered the national flag of China at Tsim Sha Tsui and threw it into the sea; the Hong Kong and Macao Affairs Office issued a statement condemning "extremist radicals who have seriously violated the National Flag Law of the People's Republic of China... flagrantly offending the dignity of the country and the nation, wantonly trampling on the baseline of the one country, two systems principle, and greatly hurting the feelings of all Chinese people".

==== Glory to Hong Kong ====
In November 2022, after a rugby match in South Korea played "Glory to Hong Kong" for the Hong Kong team, lawmaker Starry Lee said that Asia Rugby should apologize to "the entire [Chinese] population." In December 2022, Hong Kong Secretary for Security Chris Tang appealed to Google to "correct" the search results to list "March of the Volunteers" instead of "Glory to Hong Kong" when searching for the national anthem of Hong Kong, and said that the latter song being the top result hurt the feelings of Hong Kong people.

=== Australia ===
On 26 August 2020, China's deputy ambassador to Australia, Wang Xining (Chinese: 王晰宁), expressed that Australia's co-proposal for an independent investigation into the causes of the COVID-19 pandemic "hurts the feelings of the Chinese people" during his address to the National Press Club of Australia.

=== Czech Republic ===
On 31 January 2023, after Czech President-elect Petr Pavel conducted a phone call with Taiwanese president Tsai Ing-wen, foreign ministry spokeswoman Mao Ning said that he had "trampled on China's red line" and that "[t]his severely interferes in China's internal affairs and has hurt the feelings of the Chinese people."

=== France ===
On 26 October 2026, during a French talk show The Bridge, French football player Kylian Mbappé told that a meme "that makes me laugh the most...the one where there's a video of a guy, I think it's a Chinese dictator", referring to Mao Zedong. Several Chinese brands have terminated the deals with Mbappé after the incident. The Chinese foreign ministry spokesperson Guo Jiakun also stated that "words and deeds that hurt the feelings of the Chinese people will naturally be met with opposition from all sectors of Chinese society".

== See also ==
- Appeal to emotion
- Appeal to popularity
- China's final warning
- Fragile (Namewee song)
- Insulting Turkishness
- Weaponization of antisemitism
