= Midwest-China Hub Commission =

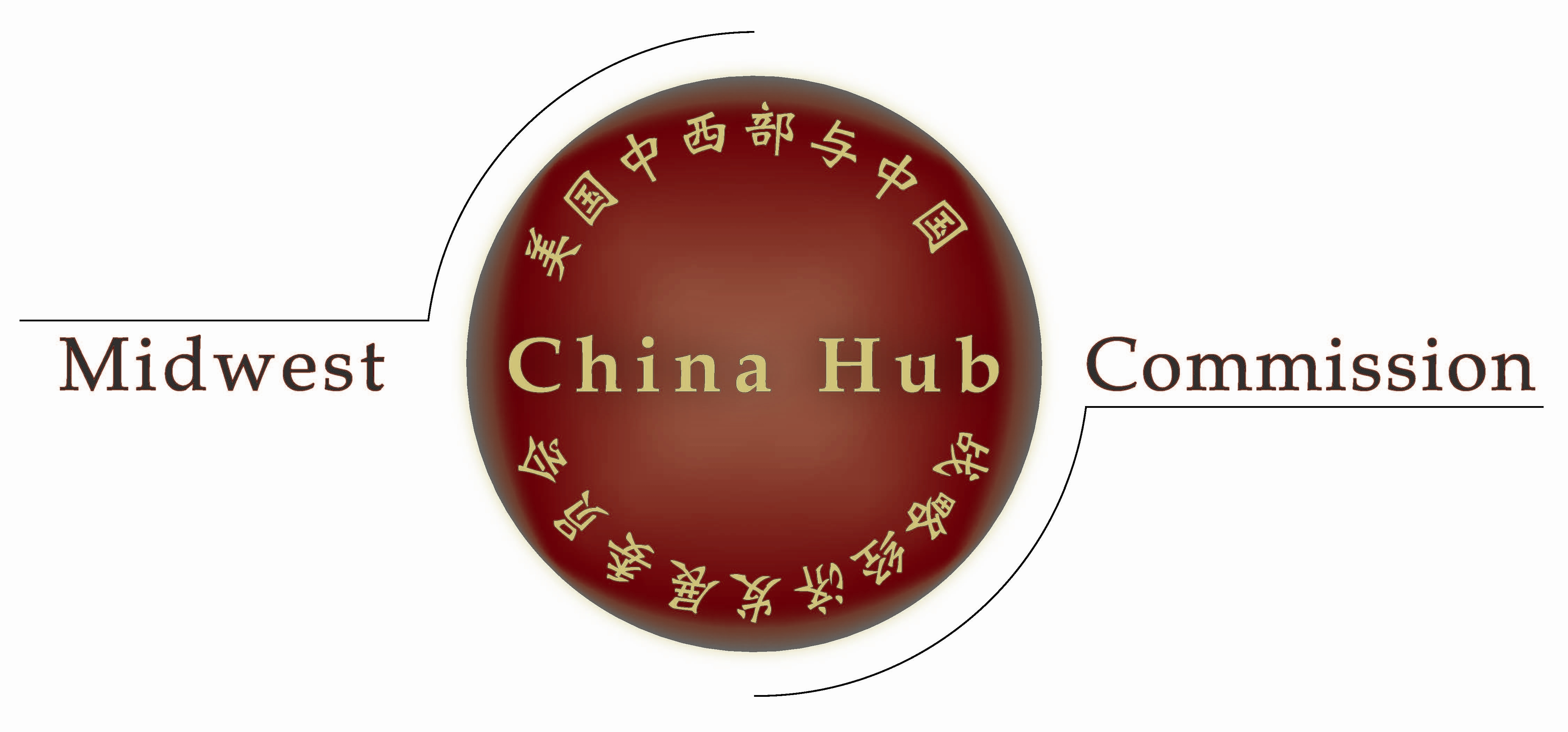
- Company type: Public-Private Partnership
- Founded: St. Louis, Missouri, U.S. (2008)
- Headquarters: World Trade Center - Saint Louis
- Area served: Midwest
- Key people: Daniel P. Mehan, Chairman; Rhonda Hamm-Niebruegge, Vice-Chair; Tim Nowak, Secretary

The Midwest-China Hub Commission (MCHC) (Chinese: 美国中西部与中国战略经济发展委员会) is a public-private trade collaboration among St. Louis and Missouri governmental officials, business associates and China.

== History ==
In March 2008, the Commission signed two Memorandums of Understanding (MoU) with the Civil Aviation Administration of China (CAAC) (Chinese: 中国民用航空局) and Chinese Ministry of Commerce (MOFCOM) (Chinese: 中华人民共和国商务部) to study a freight initiative. The primary focus was to open a dialogue to create an economic hub to increase business and cultural exchanges between the two countries. The Commission has completed two studies related to current trade with China and China freight forwarding opportunities.

The Midwest-China Hub Commission was officially formed on January 21, 2009.

The Commission is formed by the voluntary involvement of State and local government and private entities, including:

- City of St. Louis and Lambert-St. Louis International Airport
- Civic Progress
- Missouri Chamber of Commerce and Industry
- Missouri Department of Economic Development (MODED)
- Missouri Department of Transportation (MoDOT)
- Missouri Partnership
- Organization of Chinese Americans St. Louis Chapter
- St. Charles County and Partners for Progress
- St. Louis County
- St. Louis County Economic Council (SLCEC)
- St. Louis Regional Chamber and Growth Association (RCGA)
- World Trade Center - Saint Louis

In 1979, the first sister-city relationship between the U.S. and the People's Republic of China was established between St. Louis and Nanjing.

== Industry Business Councils ==
In December 2009, the Midwest-China Hub Commission and RCGA convened eight industry-specific China Business Councils to gain feedback from local businesses and leaders, help broaden the base of regional knowledge, and catalogue the breadth of business already occurring between the Saint Louis region and China. The Councils help to identify new opportunities for regional trade and backhaul.

== EB-5 Visas ==
As part of a strategy to encourage foreign investment in the St. Louis region and support international operations, the Midwest-China Hub Commission plans to establish an EB-5 regional center in the greater St. Louis area. The U.S. Citizen and Immigration Services EB-5 visa program requires potential investors to make qualifying investments ($500,000 or $1,000,000 minimums) and directly or indirectly create or save ten jobs.

The Gateway to the Midwest Investment Center (GMIC) became a non-profit EB-5 Regional Center as of September 27, 2010. Currently, the GMIC is not approved by US Citizenship and Immigration Services (USCIS), but will gain designation in 2011.

== Timeline of events ==
- February 2008: Ambassador Zhou Wenzhong meets with St. Louis business and political leaders
- March 2008: Missouri Congressional and Trade Delegation visits China to sign MOUs
- April 2008: China's Minister of Foreign Affairs Li Zhaoxing, (Chinese: 李肇星), visits the St. Louis region
- June 2008: China's Vice Premier Wang Qishan, (Chinese: 王岐山), visits the Midwest to expand agricultural trade and investment
- January 2009: Ambassador Zhou Wenzhong and Missouri leaders establish the Midwest-China Hub Commission. The Commission receives an Economic Development Administration (EDA) grant from the U.S. Department of Commerce
- February 2009: St. Louis County Port Authority receives approval to expand the Foreign Trade Zone at Lambert-St. Louis International Airport
- March 2009: The Commission travels to and establishes offices in Beijing
- May 2009: The Commission hosts the China Investment Promotion Agency (CIPA), (Chinese: 商务部投资促进事务局), to discuss investment and trade opportunities
- November 2009: The MCHC is awarded a $1.1 million grant from the State of Missouri to develop air freight for the initiative
- December 2009: Ambassador Zhou Wenzhong hosts the Commission at the Chinese Embassy in Washington, D.C.
- January 2010: The Commission hosts a freight forwarding event at Lambert-St. Louis International Airport to discuss backhaul
- February 2010: Ambassador Zhou Wenzhong visits St. Louis and Jefferson City to demonstrate continued commitment to the MCHC
- March 2010: The Midwest-China Hub Commission travels to China to begin preliminary airfreight negotiations
- May 2010: The RCGA hosted the China Investment Promotion Agency (CIPA) delegation of some 25 biotech companies and investors from throughout China for meetings with bi-state St. Louis plant and life sciences and other business and governmental leaders
- June 2010: Midwest China Hub Commission travels to Shanghai to meet with the Chinese shippers community
- August/September 2010: Republican Senator Kit Bond and Democratic Senator Claire McCaskill, joined by the members of the Midwest China Hub Commission, led a week-long mission of business, labor, civic, and governmental leaders to Beijing and Shanghai. The delegation met with Civil Aviation Administration of China, China Air Transport Association, Chinese airlines, Ministry of Commerce, Ministry of Foreign Affairs, National Development & Reform Commission, Shanghai Municipal Government, and Shanghai Municipal Commission of Agriculture. Chinese aviation officials signed an agreement that frames the final issues to be negotiated to establish the Cargo Hub at Lambert International Airport.
- Chinese aviation officials with the Civil Aviation Administration of China (CAAC) (Chinese: 中国民用航空局) and the China Air Transport Association (CATA) (Chinese: 中国航空运输协会) made a commitment to review and assess St. Louis as a potential cargo hub destination with a visit to St. Louis from Oct. 31 to Nov. 5th, 2010.
