= Zhang Yesui =

Chinese diplomat

H.E. Ambassador Zhang Yesui
- 张业遂
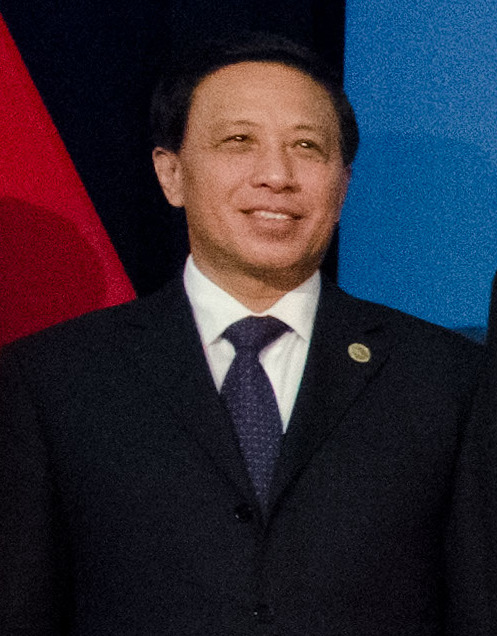

Party Secretary of the Ministry of Foreign Affairs
- In office March 2013 – January 2019
- Preceded by: Wu Dawei
- Succeeded by: Qi Yu

Chinese Ambassador to the United States
- In office March 19, 2010 – April 9, 2013
- Preceded by: Zhou Wenzhong
- Succeeded by: Cui Tiankai

Chinese Permanent Representative and Ambassador to the United Nations
- In office October 10, 2008 – March 3, 2010
- Preceded by: Wang Guangya
- Succeeded by: Li Baodong

Personal details
- Born: October 1, 1953 (age 73) Hubei Province
- Party: Chinese Communist Party
- Spouse: Chen Naiqing
- Education: Beijing Foreign Studies University; London School of Economics

Zhang Yesui
- Simplified Chinese: 张业遂
Transcriptions
Standard Mandarin
- Hanyu Pinyin: Zhāng Yèsuì [ʈʂáŋ jêswêɪ]
- Wade–Giles: Chang Yeh-sui

Zhang Yesui (Chinese: 张业遂; born October 1953) is a Chinese diplomat who served as the Vice Minister of Foreign Affairs and Chinese Communist Party Committee Secretary for the People's Republic of China. He was formerly the Chinese Ambassador to the United States. He has previously served as Permanent Representative of China to the United Nations in New York City.

== Biography ==
Zhang Yesui was born in October 1953 in Hubei Province and is a native of that region. He graduated from the Beijing Foreign Studies University and studied at the London School of Economics. After completing his education, he entered diplomatic service and was posted to the Chinese Embassy to the United Kingdom in London. Zhang then assumed various posts in the Ministry of Foreign Affairs's Department of International Organizations and Conferences and Protocol Department. In 2000, he rose to become Assistant Minister of Foreign Affairs responsible for administration, protocol and personnel and then became Vice Minister of Foreign Affairs in 2003 with areas of responsibility including policy research, Africa, Europe, North America and Oceania affairs, arms control and disarmament, and International Treaty and Law. In 2008, he was appointed China's Ambassador to the United Nations replacing Wang Guangya.

Zhang is married to Chen Naiqing, who is also an ambassador. They have a daughter. Zhang and his wife were posted to the U.N. Mission from 1988-92. Chen was ambassador to Norway (2003–2007) and ambassador to the Six Party Talks for a year and a half before coming to New York with her husband.

In 2012, Zhang was named Vice Minister of Foreign Affairs; he was later named Chinese Communist Party Committee Secretary of the Ministry of Foreign Affairs (rank equivalent of minister). Zhang is an alternate member of the 18th Central Committee of the Chinese Communist Party. In the 13th National People's Congress, he became chairperson of the Foreign Affairs Committee.

== See also ==
- Chinese in New York City

Diplomatic posts
| Preceded by Wang Guangya | Permanent Representative and Ambassador of China to the United Nations; 2008–2010 | Succeeded by Li Baodong |
| Preceded by Zhou Wenzhong | Chinese Ambassador to the United States; 2010–2013 | Succeeded by Cui Tiankai |
