= Li Luye =

PRC diplomat

- 李鹿野

Permanent Representative of China to the United Nations
- In office September 1985 – May 1990
- Preceded by: Ling Qing
- Succeeded by: Li Daoyu

Personal details
- Born: 1925 (age 100–101) Tong County, Beijing, China
- Party: Chinese Communist Party
- Education: North China United University
- Occupation: Diplomat

Li Luye (Chinese: 李鹿野; born 1925) is a Chinese diplomat who served as the Permanent Representative of China to the United Nations from 1985 to 1990.

== Diplomatic career ==
In 1946, Li enrolled in the English department of North China United University, which was established the Chinese Communist Party. He later served as the English secretary for the Relief Association of the Liberated Areas. In 1949, he held positions as the Foreign Affairs Secretary of the Wuhan Military Control Commission in Hubei Province, as well as Section Chief and Office Director of the Foreign Affairs Office of the Yunnan Provincial People's Government.

In 1956, Li joined the Ministry of Foreign Affairs, where he served as Section Chief of the First Asian Division within the ministry and Second Secretary at the Chinese Embassy in Ceylon. In 1973, he was appointed Deputy Director of the Institute of International Studies under the Ministry of Foreign Affairs, and later served as Deputy Director and Director of the International Department within the ministry. In 1983, Li was appointed as China's Permanent Representative to the United Nations Office at Geneva and other international organizations in Switzerland. During this time, he served as part of the Chinese delegation to the North–South Summit in Cancún, Mexico, in October 1981.

=== Permanent Representative of China to the United Nations ===
In 1985, he was appointed as China's Permanent Representative to the United Nations, succeeding Ling Qing. Under his tenure, in 1986, the United Nations Security Council launched 1986 as the 'International Year of Peace' at its 40th anniversary meeting. In August 1988, following the signing of the ceasefire between Iran and Iraq, which ended the Iran–Iraq War, Li appealed both countries to refrain from further military activity along their 700-mile front until the ceasefire took effect. On September 1988, Li was the author of an agreement on debate on Korean unification which for the first time allowed representatives of North Korea and South Korea to speak in the United Nations.

In 1989, when the Sub-Commission on Prevention of Discrimination and Protection of Minorities (a part of the Commission on Human Rights) met in Geneva in aftermath of the 1989 Tiananmen Square protests and massacre, adopted a resolution stating the committee was concerned about what had occurred in China and the implications the crackdown would have on the future of human rights. In response, Li replied to the Sub-Commission's adoption of resolution by stating that it was "a brutal interference in China's internal affairs." In December 1989, following the United States invasion of Panama, Li condemned the invasion stating that it "gravely violated the purposes of the U.N. Charter, but also runs counter to the relaxing of the international situation." Li left from his position as permanent representative to UN in 1990.

=== Post UN career ===
After returning to China in 1990, Li served as Director General and Party Secretary of the China Center for International Studies, Chairman of the China Pacific Economic Cooperation Council, Advisor to the China Association for International Science and Technology Cooperation, and Vice Chairman of the Foreign Affairs Committee of the National Committee of the Chinese People's Political Consultative Conference.

Li served as the spokesperson for the Second Session of the Eighth National Committee of the Chinese People's Political Consultative Conference (1994-1999).

Diplomatic posts
Preceded by Ling Qing	Permanent Representative and Ambassador of China to the United Nations; 1985–1990	Succeeded by Li Daoyu
