= Xiaogong =

Xiaogong could refer to:

== People ==
- Li Xiaogong (Chinese:李孝恭), an imperial prince and general of the Tang dynasty
- Qin Xiaogong (Chinese: 秦孝公; pinyin: Qín Xiào Gōng), the ruler of the Qin state from 361 to 338 BC during the Warring States period
- Chen Xiaogong (Chinese: 陈小工), a retired lieutenant general (zhong jiang) of the People's Liberation Army Air Force (PLAAF) of China

== Fictional Characters ==
- Xiaogong, also known as Yoimiya, (Chinese:宵宫, pinyin: Xiāogōng), a character in Genshin Impact
