= Zhang Ming =

Chinese diplomat (born 1957)

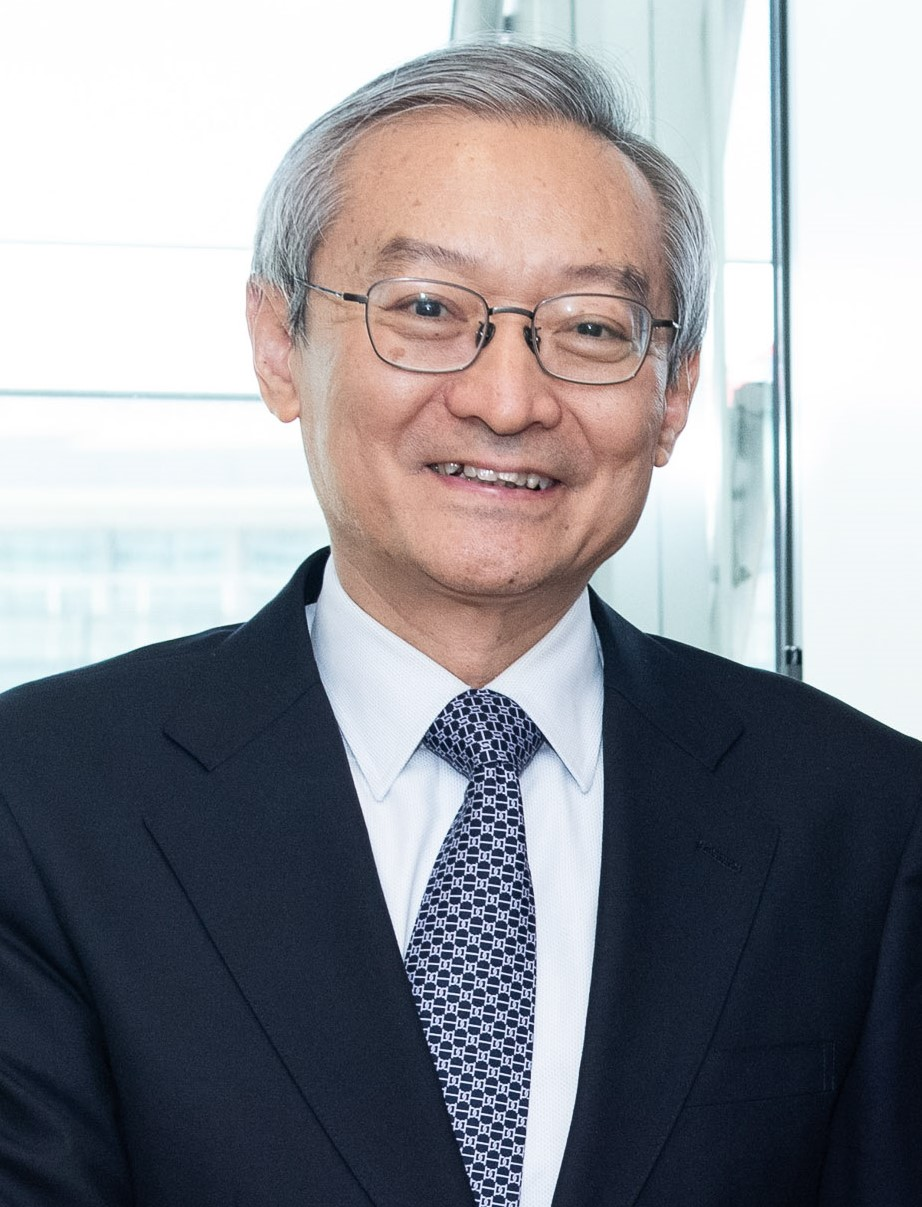
- Zhang in 2020

Secretary-General of the Shanghai Cooperation Organisation
- In office 1 January 2022 – 31 December 2024
- Preceded by: Vladimir Norov
- Succeeded by: Nurlan Yermekbayev

Chinese Ambassador to the European Union
- In office October 2017 – December 2021
- Preceded by: Yang Yanyi
- Succeeded by: Fu Cong

Chinese Ambassador to Kenya
- In office September 2006 – March 2009
- Preceded by: Guo Chongli
- Succeeded by: Deng Hongbo

Personal details
- Born: June 1957 (age 69) Li County, Hebei, China
- Party: Communist Party of China
- Education: Beijing Foreign Studies University

Zhang Ming (simplified Chinese: 张明; traditional Chinese: 張明; pinyin: Zhāng Míng, born June 1957) is a Chinese diplomat who was the Secretary-General of the Shanghai Cooperation Organisation from 2022 to 2024.

== Biography ==
Zhang was born in Li County in the city of Baoding in Hebei. He graduated from the Faculty of Asian and African Languages of Beijing Foreign Studies University with a bachelor's degree. Zhang began his career in 1975 and joined the Communist Party of China in 1983. In 2001, he became Deputy Director-General of the General Office of the Ministry of Foreign Affairs. In 2006, he became an Ambassador to Kenya, Permanent Representative to UNEP and Permanent Representative to UN-Habitat. In 2009, he became Director-General of the Department of African Affairs of the MFA. In 2010, he became Director-General of the General Office of the MFA. In 2011, he became Assistant Minister of Foreign Affairs in charge of the general office, staff, and archival work. In December 2013, he became Vice Minister of Foreign Affairs.

In October 2017, he became Ambassador to the European Union. Simultaneously he became Chef de Mission to NATO.

In his role as ambassador, he was reportedly perceived as "an old-school diplomat", not a "wolf warrior". In January 2018, he was chosen as a member of the 13th National Committee of the Chinese People's Political Consultative Conference. In 2021, during his farewell speech as Ambassador to the EU, Zhang advocated cooperation, multilateralism, and better communication in China–EU relations.

In January 2022, he became Secretary-General of the Shanghai Cooperation Organisation, a role in which he served until December 2024.
