= Li Daoyu =

Chinese diplomat (1932–2026)

- 李道豫

Chinese Ambassador to the United States
- In office 1993–1998
- Preceded by: Zhu Qizhen
- Succeeded by: Li Zhaoxing

Personal details
- Born: August 1932 Hefei, Anhui, China
- Died: 20 April 2026 (aged 93)
- Party: Chinese Communist Party
- Education: University of Shanghai
- Occupation: Diplomat

Li Daoyu (Chinese: 李道豫; August 1932 – 20 April 2026) was a Chinese diplomat who served as the Chinese Ambassador to the United States between 1993 and 1998.

== Early life and education ==
Li was born in Hefei, Anhui province, China in August 1932. He graduated from the University of Shanghai in 1952.

== Career ==
In 1952, Li entered the foreign ministry of PRC. From 1952 to 1983, he was an official of the international section of the Ministry and was promoted to vice section chief. In 1983, Li became the vice delegate to Geneva. From 1984 to 1988, Li served as the international section chief of the foreign ministry. In 1988, he became the assistant to the Foreign Minister. From 1990 to 1993, he was the delegate and ambassador to United Nations. From 1993 to 1998, Li served as the PRC's ambassador to the United States. From 1998, Li served in the National People's Congress until his retirement in 2004.

== Death ==
Li died on 20 April 2026, at the age of 93.

Diplomatic posts
Preceded by Li Luye	Permanent Representative and Ambassador of China to the United Nations; 1990–1993	Succeeded by Li Zhaoxing
