= Huang Hua =

Chinese revolutionary, politician and diplomat (1913–2010)

- 黄华
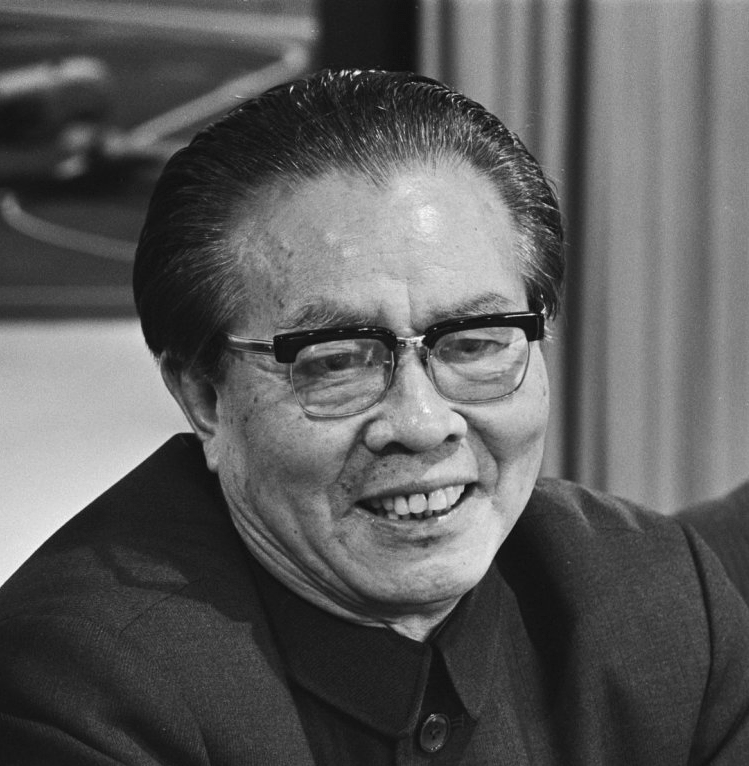
- Huang in 1978

Vice Premier of China
- In office 10 September 1980 – 4 May 1982
- Premier: Zhao Ziyang

5th Minister of Foreign Affairs
- In office 3 December 1976 – 19 November 1982
- Premier: Hua Guofeng; Zhao Ziyang
- Preceded by: Qiao Guanhua
- Succeeded by: Wu Xueqian

Permanent Representative of China to the United Nations
- In office 2 November 1971 – 29 November 1976
- Preceded by: Liu Chieh (representing the Republic of China)
- Succeeded by: Chen Chu

Personal details
- Born: Wang Rumei; January 25, 1913 Ci County, Zhili, Republic of China
- Died: November 24, 2010 (aged 97) Beijing, People's Republic of China
- Party: Chinese Communist Party
- Spouse: He Liliang (何理良)

Huang Hua (/ˈhwæŋ ˈhwɑː/; Chinese: 黄华; pinyin: Huáng Huá; 25 January 1913 – 24 November 2010) was a senior Chinese Communist revolutionary, politician, and diplomat.

Huang served as Foreign Minister of China from 1976 to 1982, and concurrently as Vice Premier from 1980 to 1982. He was instrumental in establishing diplomatic links of the People's Republic of China with the United States and Japan, and was intensely involved in the negotiations with the United Kingdom over the status of Hong Kong.

== Biography ==
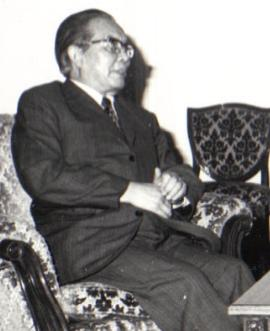
Huang Hua

Huang Hua was born Wang Rumei in Ci County, Hebei Province in 1913. His studies were disrupted due to the Chinese Civil War, leading him to continue his studies in northeast China, which itself was invaded by Japan in 1931. In 1932, he enrolled in the Yenching University in Beijing, where he was one of the early students. There, he learned excellent English and developed a close relationship with John Leighton Stuart, the American missionary who founded Yenching. He also talked with left-wing professors and read Marxist books, leading him to support communism.

=== Yan'an ===
In 1936, he joined the Chinese Communist Party (CCP) at Yenching, and assumed the name Huang Hua. Later that year, he accompanied American journalist Edgar Snow to the revolutionary base area in Yan'an, acting as the interpreter between Snow and the Communist leaders including Mao Zedong. Snow wrote the book Red Star Over China, which introduced the Chinese Communists to the world. Huang Hua remained in Yan'an after Snow left, and worked as an assistant to Marshal Zhu De and later as secretary of Marshal Ye Jianying.

During Mao's Rectification Movement which started in 1942, Huang was reported by another CCP member for using his boss's official seal without permission. Due to protection from Zhu De, Huang managed to avoid repercussions. In 1944, the United States dispatched an Army Observer Group to Yan'an to assess the CCP and its military capabilities, prompting the CCP to create a Foreign Affairs Group to receive the guests. Huang was put in charge of the Group's translation affairs. During US Army General George C. Marshall's peace missions to China, Huang served as the translator for the CCP side.

=== People's Republic of China ===
After the CCP took over Nanjing in April 1949, Huang was sent to the city to take over the Republic of China's foreign ministry and send ministerial documents to Beijing. He was also authorized by Mao to meet John Leighton Stuart, who was by now the US Ambassador to China, though the talks ultimately failed. Mao proclamated of the People's Republic of China on 1 October 1949, and Huang's English skills ensured him a position in the newly established Ministry of Foreign Affairs. Initially staying in Nanjing, Huang was later transferred to handle foreign affairs in Shanghai. In 1953, he was involved in the Korean War armistice talks. He was also part of the initial contacts with the United States in Warsaw, Poland in 1958.

During the 1960s, Huang spent much of his time abroad serving as ambassador to Ghana and then Egypt. By summer 1967, Huang, ambassador to Egypt at this time, was China's only remaining ambassador overseas due to the Cultural Revolution. When he returned home during the height of the Cultural Revolution, he was arrested along with his wife and banished to labor reform in the countryside. His exile did not last long however, as he was rehabilitated in 1970, and served as Mao's translator during an interview with Edgar Snow in August 1970.

Beginning in 1971, Huang was the first Permanent Representative to the UN from the People's Republic of China after the UN seat was transferred to the mainland Chinese government. Huang also signed the Sino-Japanese Peace and Friendship Treaty with Japanese Foreign Minister Sonoda on August 12, 1978.

After Mao Zedong's death in 1976, Foreign Minister Qiao Guanhua, an ally of the radical Gang of Four, was dismissed from his post and Huang appointed as his replacement. Huang accompanied Chinese leader Deng Xiaoping during his visit to the United States in January 1979, which led to the establishing of diplomatic relations. Along with Premier Zhao Ziyang, Huang participated in the 1981 North–South Summit. At the summit, Huang received instructions from Zhao to soften the PRC's anti-Soviet talking points. Huang and his deputy Pu Shoucang did not comply, which Zhao saw as a challenge to his authority.

When Soviet leader Leonid Brezhnev died in November 1982, a Chinese delegation headed by Huang Hua as Foreign Minister attended the funeral, where Huang praised the late Soviet leader as "an outstanding champion of world peace," and expressed his hope for normalized relations with Moscow. This was during the Sino-Soviet split, when PRC and the USSR competed for influence in the world. Huang was succeeded as Foreign Minister by Wu Xueqian after his return to China. Huang nevertheless stayed active in "friendship diplomacy" after his retirement, meeting Henry Kissinger during the 2008 Summer Olympics in Beijing. Huang died on 24 November 2010 at the age of 97.

== Personal life ==
In 1944 in Yan'an, Huang married He Liliang (born July 1926). They had two sons and one daughter.

Government offices
Preceded by Qiao Guanhua	Foreign Minister of the People's Republic of China; 1976–1982	Succeeded by Wu Xueqian
Diplomatic posts
Preceded by Liu Chieh; Representing the Republic of China	Permanent Representative and Ambassador of China to the United Nations; 1971–1976	Succeeded by Chen Chu
