= Wang Yingfan =

Chinese diplomat

H.E. Ambassador Wang Yingfan
- 王英凡
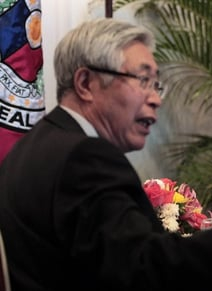
- Wang in 2012

Permanent Representative and Ambassador of China to the United Nations
- In office October 2000 – June 2003
- Preceded by: Qin Huasun
- Succeeded by: Wang Guangya

Chinese Ambassador to the Philippines
- In office 1988–1990
- Preceded by: Chen Songlu
- Succeeded by: Huang Guifang

Personal details
- Born: April 1, 1942 (age 84) Inner-Mongolia Autonomous Region
- Party: Chinese Communist Party
- Education: Beijing Foreign Studies University

Wang Yingfan (Chinese: 王英凡; born April 1942) is a Chinese diplomat who served as Permanent Representative of China to the United Nations from 2000 to 2003. He was also the Chinese Ambassador to the Philippines from 1988 to 1990.

== Biography ==
Wang Yingfan was born in the Inner-Mongolia Autonomous Region of the People's Republic of China in April 1942. Wang graduated from Beijing Foreign Studies University. He served as Chinese ambassador to the Philippines from 1988 to 1990. Wang served as Permanent Representative of China to the United Nations from 2000 to 2003. Wang was Vice-Chairman of the National People's Congress Foreign Affairs Committee from 2003 to 2008. Wang is married and has a daughter.

In 2012, he made a visit to the Philippines and attended a media forum organized by the Chinese embassy in Manila. He stated that there is no issue for the Philippines' acquirement of US weapons, however, he warned of US "meddling" in the region, particularly the South China Sea dispute.

== See also ==
- China and the United Nations

Diplomatic posts
| Preceded by Qin Huasun | Permanent Representative and Ambassador of China to the United Nations; October 2000 – June 2003 | Succeeded by Wang Guangya |
