= Wang Guangya =

Chinese diplomat

- 王光亚
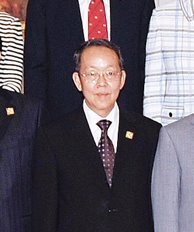

Director of the Hong Kong and Macau Affairs Office
- In office October 2010 – 22 September 2017
- Premier: Wen Jiabao; Li Keqiang
- Preceded by: Liao Hui
- Succeeded by: Zhang Xiaoming

Permanent Representative and Ambassador of China to the United Nations
- In office August 2003 – September 2008
- Preceded by: Wang Yingfan
- Succeeded by: Zhang Yesui

Personal details
- Born: March 1950 (age 76) Funing County, Jiangsu, China
- Party: Chinese Communist Party
- Education: London School of Economics; Johns Hopkins University

Wang Guangya (born March 1950; Chinese: 王光亚; pinyin: Wáng Guāngyà) is a Chinese diplomat who is the former Director of the Hong Kong and Macau Affairs Office of the State Council of the People's Republic of China. A career diplomat, Wang was previously Vice Minister of Foreign Affairs. He served as Permanent Representative of the People's Republic of China to the United Nations from 2003 to 2008.

== Background ==
=== Education ===
Wang studied at Student Center of British Council, at the United World College of the Atlantic in Wales, and at the London School of Economics in England. He is a graduate from the School of Advanced International Studies at Johns Hopkins University in Maryland, United States, in 1982.

=== Family ===
Wang is married to Chen Yi's daughter Cong Jun and has a son.

== Career ==
Wang was appointed Permanent Representative to the United Nations on 25 August 2003. He was President of the United Nations Security Council for the month of February 2004. On 3 May 2006, when Britain and France introduced a UN Security Council resolution insisting Iran end its nuclear program, Wang commented, "I don't think this draft as it stands now will produce good results. I think it's tougher than expected."

According to a September 2006 profile of Wang in The New York Times Magazine, he was considered the top contender for the post of Minister of Foreign Affairs in Beijing in 2007.

In October 2010 he became the second post-handover director of the Hong Kong and Macau Affairs Office. There have only been two directors for the affairs office. Wang spends most of his time in Beijing. Though he did make a three-day visit to Hong Kong in 2011 to address the Home Ownership Scheme issue. His working style is very different compared to the previous director Liao Hui who kept silent from public and worked in mystery the 13 years he was in charge of Hong Kong.

== Controversy ==
=== One country two systems comment ===
Zhao Lianhai was a worker who defended the victims of the 2008 Chinese milk scandal. On 29 December 2010 Wang Guangya said that because of the One country, two systems Hong Kong should not interfere with the issue. He then made the controversial statement, "well water should not mix with river water" (Chinese: 井水不犯河水; pinyin: Jǐngshuǐ bùfàn héshuǐ). Pro-Beijing member Ip Kwok-him then tried to defend the director by saying that Hong Kong citizens were only concerned about mainland affairs, and that they do care about One country two systems as well as the mainland justice system. Chief Secretary for Administration Henry Tang was asked to interpret what the water-river statement meant. He only smiled and did not answer. The phrase was first used by former General Secretary of the Chinese Communist Party Jiang Zemin in December 1989 when he met the prime minister of the United Kingdom. He previously said "Well water should not mix with river water, river water should not mix with well water."

Government offices
Preceded by Liao Hui	Director of the Hong Kong and Macau Affairs Office; 2010–2017	Succeeded by Zhang Xiaoming
Diplomatic posts
Preceded by Wang Yingfan	Permanent Representative and Ambassador of China to the United Nations; 2003–2008	Succeeded by Zhang Yesui
