= Li Baodong =

Chinese diplomat

H.E. Ambassador Li Baodong
- 李保东
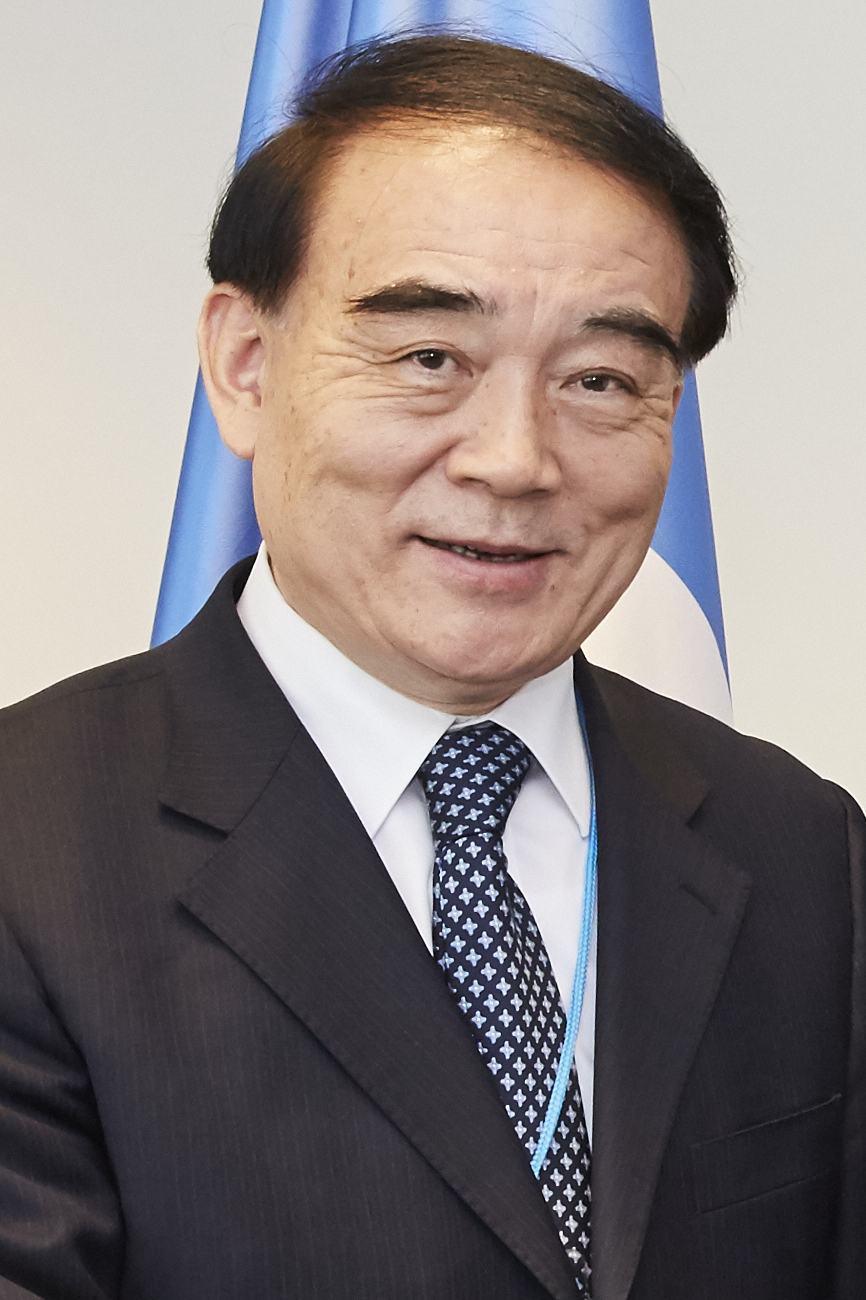
- Li Baodong in 2016.

Vice Minister of Foreign Affairs of People's Republic of China
- Incumbent
- Assumed office 17 November 2010

Permanent Representative and Ambassador of China to the United Nations
- In office 4 March 2010 – 23 August 2013
- Preceded by: Zhang Yesui
- Succeeded by: Liu Jieyi

Chinese Ambassador to the United Nations Office at Geneva
- In office 2006–2009

Chinese Ambassador to Zambia
- In office 2005–2006

Personal details
- Born: April 1, 1955 (age 71) Beijing, China
- Party: Chinese Communist Party
- Education: Beijing Foreign Studies University; Johns Hopkins University

Li Baodong (Chinese: 李保东; born April 1955) is a Chinese diplomat who served as the Permanent Representative of the People's Republic of China to the United Nations from 2010 to 2013. He was later succeeded by Liu Jieyi.

== Biography ==
Li was born in April 1955 and is a native of Beijing. He completed his studies at the Beijing Foreign Studies University and Johns Hopkins University. After graduating from university, Li entered diplomatic service and assumed various posts in the Ministry of Foreign Affairs. From 2005 to 2007, he served as Ambassador to Zambia. In 2007, Li was appointed as Permanent Representative of the People's Republic of China to the United Nations Office at Geneva and Other International Organizations in Switzerland. In 2010, he was appointed China's Permanent Representative to the United Nations replacing Zhang Yesui. During the months of March 2011 and June 2012, Li was the President of the United Nations Security Council. He is married and has a son.

== See also ==
- Chinese in New York City

Diplomatic posts
Preceded by Zhang Yesui	Permanent Representative and Ambassador of China to the United Nations; 2010–2013	Succeeded by Liu Jieyi
