= Fu Cong =

Chinese diplomat (born 1965)

- 傅聪
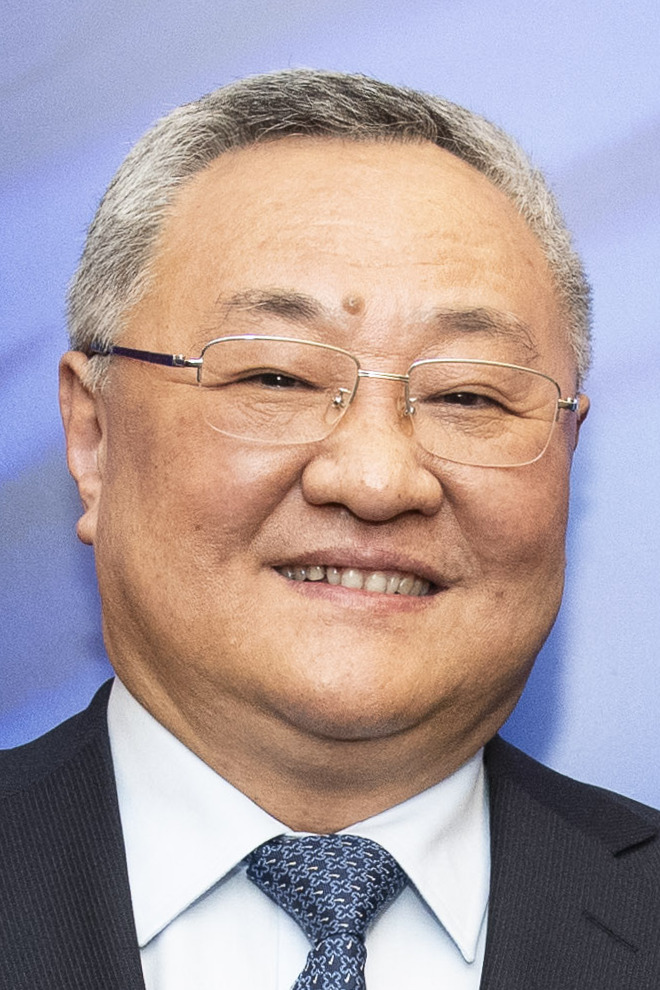
- Fu in 2024

Permanent Representative of China to the United Nations
- Incumbent
- Assumed office 13 April 2024
- President: Xi Jinping
- Premier: Li Qiang
- Preceded by: Zhang Jun

Ambassador of China to the European Union
- In office 16 December 2022 – 25 March 2024
- Preceded by: Zhang Ming
- Succeeded by: Cai Run

Personal details
- Born: June 1965 (age 61)
- Party: Chinese Communist Party

Fu Cong (Chinese: 傅聪; pinyin: Fù Cōng; born June 1965) is a Chinese diplomat who has worked in the foreign service of the People's Republic of China since 1987. He has been serving as Permanent Representative of China to the United Nations since April 2024.

He previously served as head of the Permanent Mission of China to the European Union from 2022 to 2024, as director general of the Arms Control Department of the Ministry of Foreign Affairs from 2018 to 2022, and as Ambassador of China for Disarmament Affairs in Geneva from 2015 to 2019.

== Career ==
In 1987, Fu began working for the Department of International Organizations and Conferences of the Ministry of Foreign Affairs as a staff member and attaché. In 1991, he became an attaché to the Permanent Mission of China to the United Nations office in Geneva. In 1992, he returned to China to work once again as an attaché to the Department of International Organizations and Conferences of the MFA, being promoted to the positions of Third Secretary and Deputy Director. In 1996, Fu was made Second Secretary of the Permanent Mission of China to the UN Office in Vienna, returning to China in 1997 to become the Second Secretary of the Department of Arms Control of the Ministry of Foreign Affairs. He remained in this department until 2004, achieving the positions of Division Director, Counselor, and Deputy Director over his tenure.

In 2004, Fu was appointed Deputy Director of the Foreign Affairs Office of the People's Government of the Xinjiang Uyghur Autonomous Region. In 2005, he returned to Europe to serve as Counselor to the Permanent Mission of China to the UN Offices in Geneva. Fu was promoted to Minister Counselor in 2007 before becoming an Advisor to the Director-General of the UN World Health Organization. He served in this role until 2013, when he once again returned to China to become the Cyber Affairs Coordinator for the Ministry of Foreign Affairs.

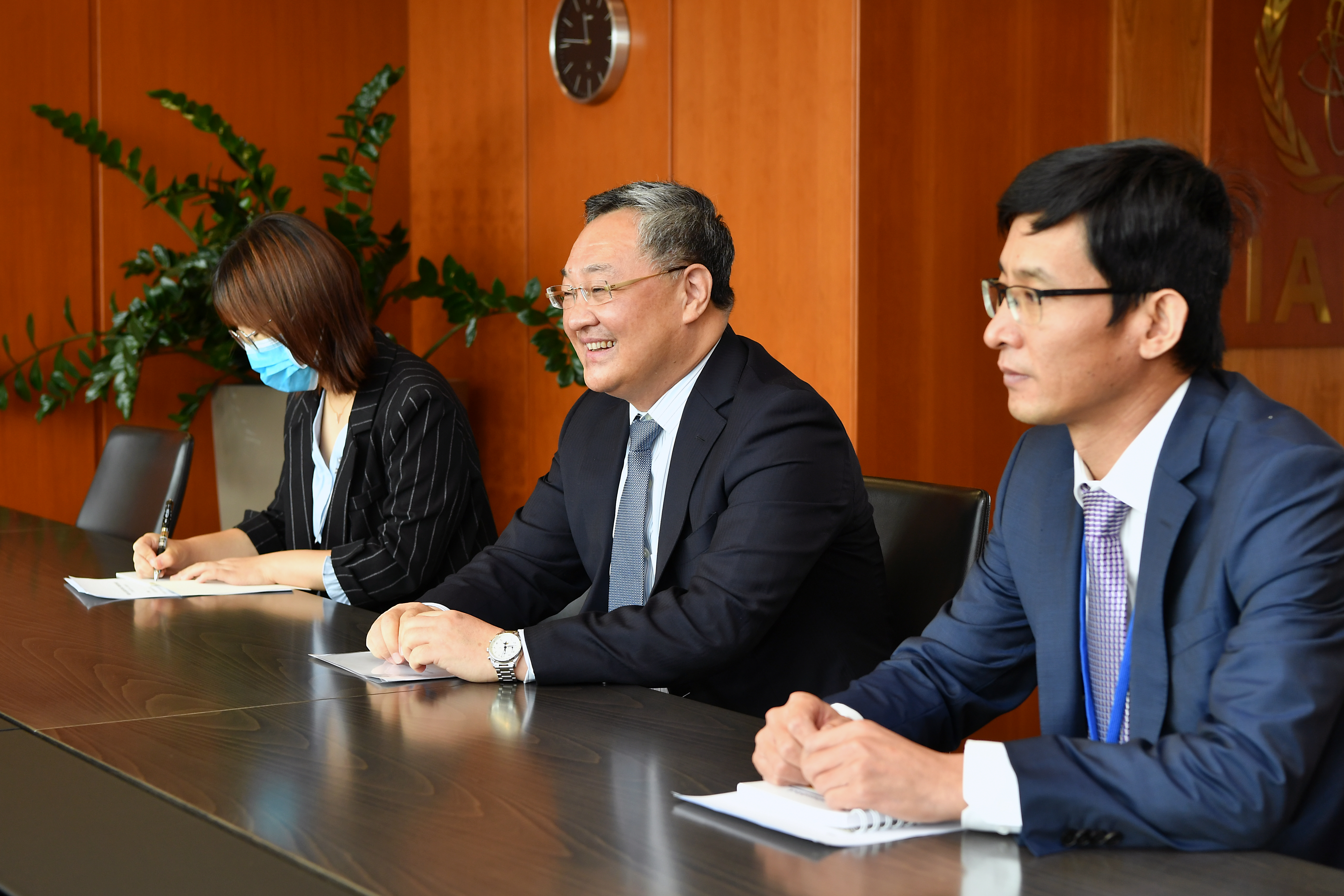
Fu at IAEA Headquarters in August 2020

Fu returned to Europe in 2015 to serve as the Chinese representative to the Conference on Disarmament and as the Deputy Permanent Representative to the UN Offices in Geneva, positions which he held until 3 February 2019. While serving in these positions in Geneva, Fu was appointed Director-General of the Department of Arms Control of the Ministry of Foreign Affairs. Fu held this position until his appointment as China's Ambassador to the European Union in December 2022. This position was left vacant for nearly one year prior to his appointment. On 25 March 2024, he stepped down as Head of China's Permanent Mission to the European Union.

=== Permanent Representative to the United Nations ===
On 13 April 2024, he was appointed as China's Permanent Representative to the United Nations.

Permanent Representative Fu Cong's letter to United Nations Secretary General António Guterres regarding China's position on Takaichi's remarks (2025)

On 18 November 2025, amidst the China–Japan diplomatic crisis, at the plenary session of the United Nations General Assembly on Security Council reform, Fu Cong said Japan was "totally unqualified to demand a permanent seat on the Security Council". A Japanese representative described Fu's accusations as groundless and said Tokyo had contributed to maintaining peace and prosperity in the world. On 22 November, Fu delivered a letter to the UN Secretary-General António Guterres to be distributed to all UN member states which said if Japan were to intervene militarily in the event of a war between China and Taiwan, it would constitute an act of aggression and that China would exercise its right of self-defense under the UN Charter and international law. In an emailed statement to Reuters, Japan's Foreign Ministry said it was aware of Fu's letter which it said contained claims that were "entirely unacceptable" and reiterated the country's commitment to peace.

On 1 December, Fu sent a second letter to Secretary-General Guterres as a reply to Japanese Ambassador to the UN Kazuyuki Yamazaki's letter, in which he wrote that Takaichi's statement was the "greatest challenge" which damaged relations between the two countries, and said Japan "should clearly reaffirm the one-China principle,,, immediately retract the erroneous remarks and take practical steps to honor its commitments to China". He also called on the international community to "remain highly vigilant against Japan's ambitions to expand its military capabilities and revive militarism". In response, Japanese Chief Cabinet Secretary Minoru Kihara called China's allegations "not true at all" and "totally unacceptable", saying Japan has "consistently contributed to the peace and prosperity" since the end of World War II.
