= Chen Chu (diplomat) =

Chinese diplomat

- 陈楚
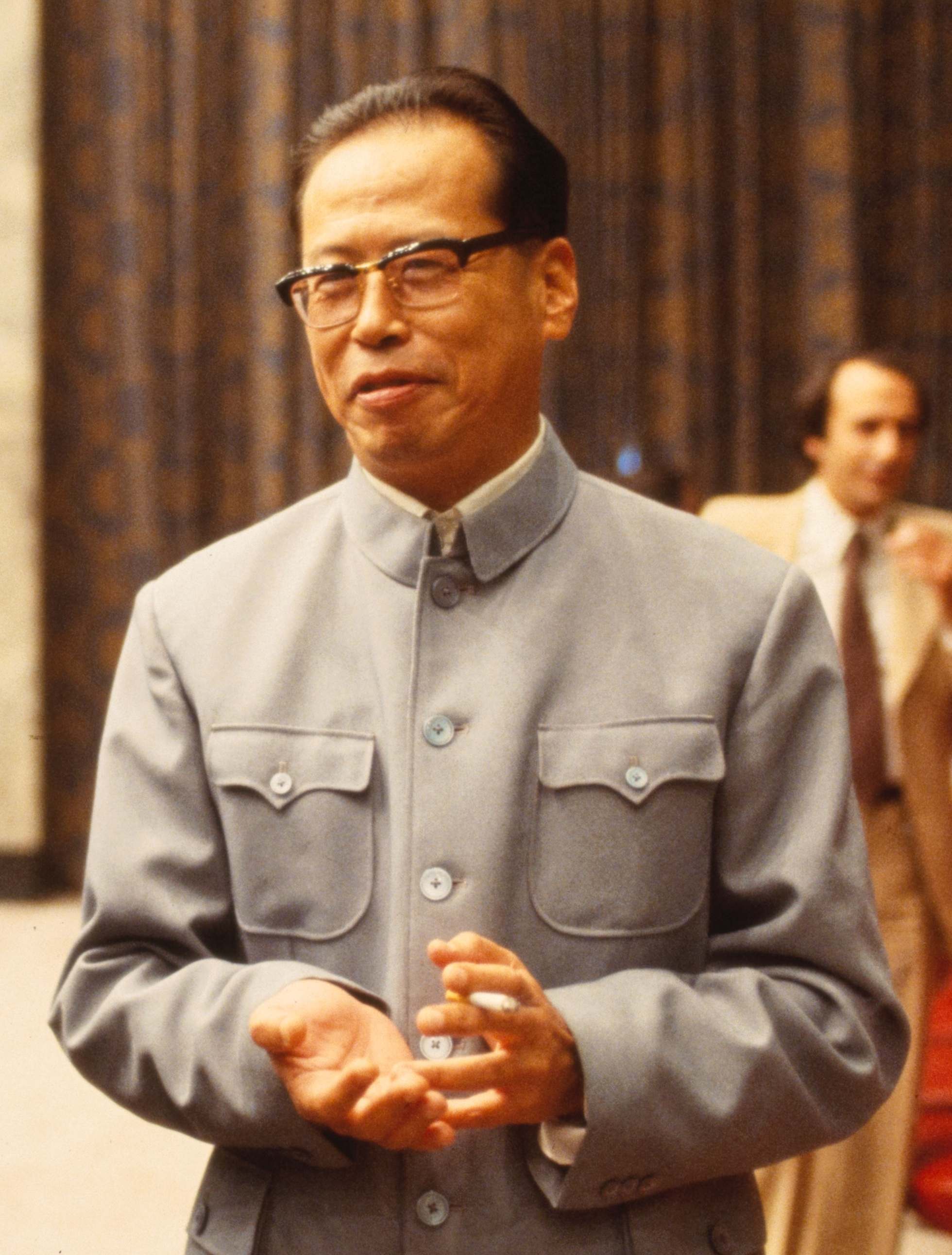
- Chen at the United Nations headquarters in 1979

Permanent Representative of China to the United Nations
- In office May 1977 – June 1980
- Preceded by: Huang Hua
- Succeeded by: Ling Qing

Ambassador of China to Japan
- In office April 1973 – December 1976
- Preceded by: Position established
- Succeeded by: Fu Hao

Personal details
- Born: 1917 Rongcheng, Shandong, Republic of China
- Died: 27 January 1996 (aged 78–79) Beijing, China
- Party: Chinese Communist Party
- Children: Chen Xiaogong (son)

Chen Chu (Chinese: 陈楚; Wade–Giles: Ch'en Ch'u, 1917–1999) was a Chinese journalist and diplomat. A member of the Chinese Communist Party from 1938, he took part in the anti-Japanese resistance in Shandong and edited several party newspapers before joining the Ministry of Foreign Affairs in 1954. He was the first ambassador of the People's Republic of China to Japan from 1973 to 1976, and he served as China's permanent representative to the United Nations from 1977.

== Early life and revolutionary career ==
Chen was born in 1917 in Henan Village, in what is now Yatou Town, Rongcheng, Shandong. His parents paid for him to study at the normal school in Qufu, and he graduated from there. He later attended a private Shandong senior high school in Beiping, as Beijing was then known, and he was expelled for taking part in anti-Japanese student activities.

Chen joined the Chinese Communist Party (CCP) in January 1938. On 1 February 1938, he took part in an anti-Japanese armed uprising at Huangshan, then in Wendeng County and now part of Rongcheng, where he commanded the uprising's third company. From 1939, he held political posts in the communist Shandong Column, including director of the political departments of its second and third detachments and deputy director of the political department of its third brigade. He was also deputy director of the political department of a military sub-district of the Shandong Military Region. In 1943, he became a section chief in the propaganda department of the Shandong Military Region and in the propaganda section of the CCP's Shandong Sub-bureau.

== Journalism career ==
In June 1944, Chen became deputy editor-in-chief and acting editor-in-chief of the Dazhong Daily, the newspaper of the CCP's Shandong Sub-bureau. In late 1945, he led the founding of the Andong Daily in Andong, now Dandong, and he became its first president when the paper was launched on 22 November 1945. The paper was renamed the Liaodong Daily in 1947, and Chen served as its president. In November 1948, after communist forces took Shenyang, he became deputy president of the Northeast Daily.

In 1949, Chen went to Wuhan to take part in the communist takeover of the city, and he helped to found the Changjiang Daily for the CCP's Central-South Bureau. The paper published its first issue on 23 May 1949, and Chen served as its editor-in-chief and later as its president. After the founding of the People's Republic, he became deputy head of the propaganda department of the CCP Central-South Bureau.

== Diplomatic career ==
=== Early posts ===
Chen was transferred to the Ministry of Foreign Affairs in the autumn of 1954. He served as director of the ministry's Department of Soviet and Eastern European Affairs, as minister-counsellor at the Chinese embassy in the Soviet Union, and as deputy director of the Institute of International Relations. He later headed the ministry's Department of West Asian and North African Affairs and its Information Department. In 1963, he accompanied Premier Zhou Enlai and Foreign Minister Chen Yi on a tour of 14 countries in Asia and Africa.

=== Deputy representative at the United Nations ===
After the People's Republic of China took over China's seat at the United Nations in 1971, Chen was appointed a deputy representative to assist Huang Hua, the country's first permanent representative. In November 1971, the US mission to the United Nations reported that Chen was the only member of the Chinese delegation below Huang with ambassadorial rank, and that he had been designated as the deputy for the Security Council.

=== Ambassador to Japan ===
In February 1973, the chargé d'affaires Mi Guojun arrived in Tokyo to open the embassy of the People's Republic of China. Chen was appointed as China's first ambassador to Japan, and he served from April 1973 to December 1976.

During Chen's time in Tokyo, the two countries began negotiations on a treaty of peace and friendship, and the Japanese foreign ministry stated in 1975 that talks had been held in Tokyo and Beijing since November 1974. When the negotiations resumed in July 1978, Vice Foreign Minister Han Nianlong identified China's proposed clause opposing hegemony as the main obstacle during the previous three and a half years of talks.

=== Permanent Representative to the United Nations ===
Chen became China's permanent representative to the United Nations in 1977. The Secretary-General reported that his credentials as China's representative on the Security Council, signed by the Chinese foreign minister, were dated 10 May 1977.

In a letter dated 11 December 1978 to Rüdiger von Wechmar, Chen denounced Vietnam's war against Cambodia and its treatment of ethnic Chinese in Vietnam. After Vietnamese forces captured Phnom Penh in January 1979, the Security Council met to consider a telegram from the government of Democratic Kampuchea. Chen told the council on 11 January that "the temporary loss of the capital in no way affects the legal status of the Government of Democratic Kampuchea", which he described as "the sole legal government of Kampuchea". He said that the Chinese government "strongly condemns the Vietnamese authorities for their crimes of aggression", and he urged the council to take emergency measures to condemn Vietnam. On 15 January, Chen said that a draft resolution before the council was "not strong enough", but that China would support it because it contained "the basic and minimum elements". Referring to the new authorities in Phnom Penh, he said that "a puppet is a puppet by any other name", and he called "Soviet social-imperialism" the "arch-criminal" responsible for the aggression against Kampuchea. The draft received 13 votes in favour, including China's, but it was not adopted because of Soviet Union's veto.

On 17 February 1979, Chen sent the Secretary-General a statement by the Xinhua News Agency which said that Chinese frontier troops had been forced to counter-attack after more than 700 Vietnamese provocations in the previous six months. The statement said that China "will not attack unless we are attacked", and it proposed negotiations to restore peace on the border and to settle boundary disputes. When the Security Council discussed the Sino-Vietnamese War on 23 February, Chen described China's action as "a necessary action of self-defence" under Article 51 of the UN Charter. He said that Chinese troops, "driven beyond forbearance", had been forced "to rise in limited counter-attacks", and that they would afterwards return to defending China's border. He also called Vietnam "a pawn of the Soviet hegemonists", demanded that it withdraw its forces from Cambodia, and proposed that the two countries hold negotiations.

On 16 March 1979, Chen met Secretary-General Kurt Waldheim to discuss the situation in Indochina. In April 1979, he circulated a Chinese memorandum on a 1977 meeting between Vice Premier Li Xiannian and Prime Minister Phạm Văn Đồng. The memorandum set out China's account of the decline in relations with Vietnam from 1974, including border incidents, disputes over the Paracel and Spratly Islands, and the treatment of ethnic Chinese in Vietnam. In September 1979, he circulated a speech by Han Nianlong at the Sino-Vietnamese negotiations, which accused Vietnam of obstructing the talks.

After the Soviet intervention in Afghanistan in December 1979, Chen told the Security Council on 5 January 1980 that it formed part of what he called the "Soviet global strategy for world domination". He said that the world's people faced a common duty "to combat hegemonism and defend world peace". At a later meeting that month, he announced that China would vote for a draft resolution on Afghanistan, and he said that "the Soviet authorities must withdraw all their invading forces". The draft received 13 votes in favour, but it was not adopted because of the Soviet Union's veto.

== Later life and death ==
In August 1980, Chen became a deputy secretary-general of the State Council responsible for foreign affairs. In 1985, he became a member and secretary-general of the Central Foreign Affairs Leading Group. In June 1989, he became president of the International Strategy Foundation. After his retirement, he continued to work to promote relations between China and Japan. Chen died of illness in Beijing in January 1999.

== Personal life ==
Chen's son, Chen Xiaogong, became a lieutenant general and deputy commander of the People's Liberation Army Air Force.

== Awards and honors ==
- Order of the Sacred Treasure, 1st class (Japan, 1992)

Preceded by New office	Ambassador of China to Japan; 1973–1976	Succeeded by Fu Hao
Preceded by Huang Hua	Permanent Representative of the People's Republic of China to the United Nations; 1977–1980	Succeeded by Ling Qing
