= Permanent Representative of China to the United Nations =

List of permanent representatives and ambassadors of China to the UN

Permanent Representative and Ambassador of China to the United Nations 中国常驻联合国代表
- National emblem of China

- Flag of the United Nations

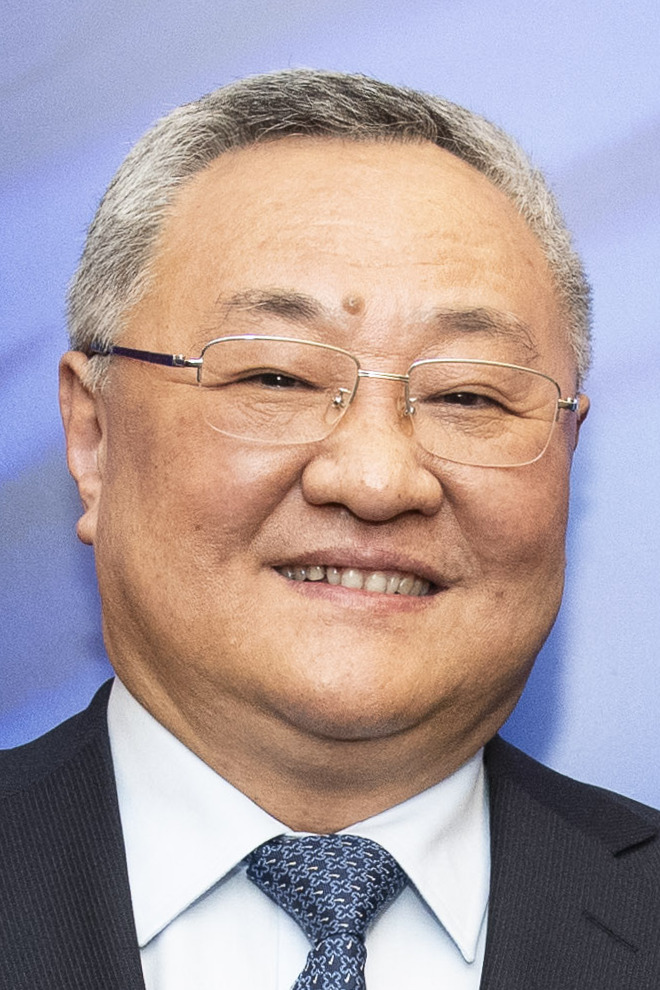
- Incumbent; Fu Cong since 13 April 2024
- Appointer: President of China, according to the decision of the National People's Congress
- Inaugural holder: Huang Hua
- Formation: 1971; 55 years ago
- Website: un.china-mission.gov.cn

This is a list of permanent representatives and ambassadors of China to the United Nations. The current office holder is Fu Cong, who took office in 2024. The permanent mission of the People's Republic of China to the United Nations is located at 350 East 35th Street at Midtown Manhattan in New York City.

#	Name	Image	Years served	UN Secretary-General	Paramount leader	President of China issuing the appointment
1	Huang Hua 黄华		1971–1976	U Thant; Kurt Waldheim	Mao Zedong	Abolition of the presidency
2	Chen Chu 陈楚		1977–1980	Kurt Waldheim	Hua Guofeng	Abolition of the presidency
3	Ling Qing 凌青		1980–1985	Kurt Waldheim; Javier Pérez de Cuéllar	Hua Guofeng	Li Xiannian
4	Li Luye 李鹿野		1985–1990	Javier Pérez de Cuéllar	Deng Xiaoping	Li Xiannian
5	Li Daoyu 李道豫		1990–1993	Javier Pérez de Cuéllar; Boutros Boutros-Ghali	Deng Xiaoping	Yang Shangkun
6	Li Zhaoxing 李肇星		1993–1995	Boutros Boutros-Ghali	Jiang Zemin	Yang Shangkun
7	Qin Huasun 秦华孙		1995–2000	Boutros Boutros-Ghali; Kofi Annan	Jiang Zemin	Jiang Zemin
8	Wang Yingfan 王英凡		2000–2003	Kofi Annan	Jiang Zemin	Jiang Zemin
9	Wang Guangya 王光亚		2003–2008	Kofi Annan; Ban Ki-moon	Jiang Zemin	Jiang Zemin
10	Zhang Yesui 张业遂		2008–2010	Ban Ki-moon	Hu Jintao	Hu Jintao
11	Li Baodong 李保东		2010–2013	Ban Ki-moon	Hu Jintao	Hu Jintao
12	Liu Jieyi 刘结一		2013–2018	Ban Ki-moon; António Guterres	Xi Jinping	Xi Jinping
13	Ma Zhaoxu 马朝旭		2018–2019	António Guterres	Xi Jinping	Xi Jinping
14	Zhang Jun 张军		2019–2024	António Guterres	Xi Jinping	Xi Jinping
15	Fu Cong 傅聪		2024–present	António Guterres	Xi Jinping	Xi Jinping

== Pre-1971 representatives ==
Permanent Representative and Ambassador of China to the United Nations 中國常駐聯合國代表
- Emblem of the Republic of China

- Flag of the United Nations
- Appointer: President of the Republic of China
- Inaugural holder: Guo Taiqi
- Formation: 1946; 80 years ago
- Abolished: 1971; 55 years ago

Appointed by Republic of China (ROC)

#	Name	Image	Years served	UN Secretary-General	President of China	Vice President of China
1	Guo Taiqi (Quo Tai-chi) 郭泰祺		1946–1947	Trygve Lie	Chiang Kai-shek	Li Zongren
2	Tsiang Tingfu (Jiang Tingfu) 蔣廷黻		1947–1962	Trygve Lie; Dag Hammarskjöld; U Thant	Chiang Kai-shek	Li Zongren
3	Liu Chieh (Liu Jie) 劉鍇		1962–1971	U Thant	Chiang Kai-shek	Chen Cheng; Yen Chia-kan

== See also ==
- China and the United Nations
- Foreign relations of China
- List of current permanent representatives to the United Nations
