= Liu Jieyi =

Chinese diplomat and politician

H.E. Ambassador Liu Jieyi
- 刘结一
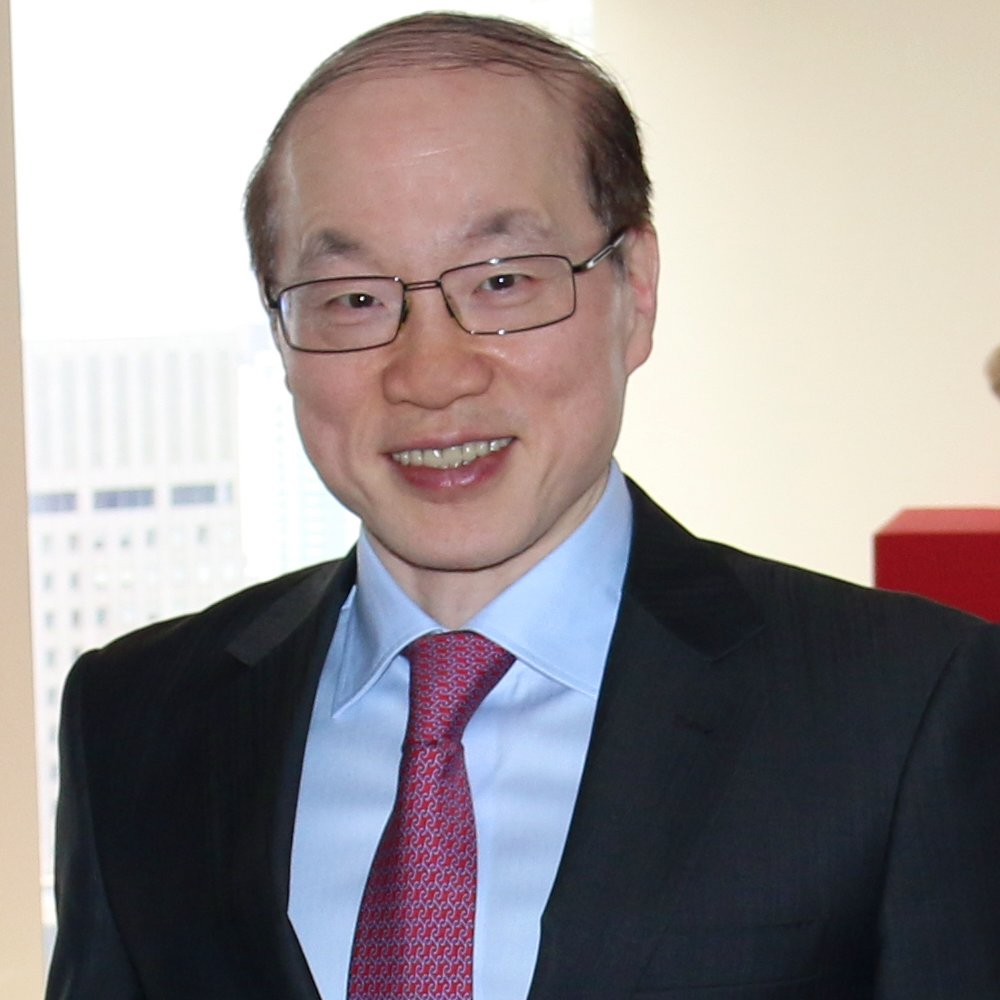
- Liu in 2015

Director of the Taiwan Affairs Office
- In office 19 March 2018 – 28 December 2022
- Premier: Li Keqiang
- Preceded by: Zhang Zhijun
- Succeeded by: Song Tao

Permanent Representative of China to the United Nations
- In office 23 August 2013 – 11 October 2017
- Preceded by: Li Baodong
- Succeeded by: Ma Zhaoxu

Personal details
- Born: December 1957 (age 68) Beijing
- Party: Chinese Communist Party
- Spouse: Zhang Qiyue
- Children: 1
- Education: Beijing Foreign Studies University
- Occupation: Politician, diplomat

Liu Jieyi (simplified Chinese: 刘结一; traditional Chinese: 劉結一; pinyin: Liú Jiéyī; born December 1957) is a Chinese diplomat and politician. From March 2018 to December 2022, he was director of the Taiwan Affairs Office. From 2013 to September 2017, he was China's Permanent Representative to the United Nations (UN) in New York City.

== Biography ==
Liu was born in Beijing. He attended Beijing Foreign Studies University and from 1981 to 1987 worked as a translator at the UN offices in Geneva. In 1987, he joined the Ministry of Foreign Affairs of the People's Republic of China, where he worked in various positions until 2009.

From 2009 to 2013, Liu was the Vice Minister of the International Liaison Department of the Chinese Communist Party.

In 2013, Liu succeeded Li Baodong as China's Permanent Representative to the UN in Manhattan. Liu acted as President of the UN Security Council four times - in November 2013, February 2015, April 2016 and July 2017.

Starting October 2017 and up to March 2018, Liu served as Deputy Director of the Taiwan Affairs Office. He was promoted to Director in March 2018, replacing Zhang Zhijun.

== Personal life ==
Liu is married to diplomat Zhang Qiyue. The couple has a son.

== See also ==
- Chinese in New York City

Diplomatic posts
| Preceded by Li Baodong | Permanent Representative of China to the United Nations; 2013–2017 | Succeeded by Ma Zhaoxu |
Government offices
| Preceded by Zhang Zhijun | Director of the Taiwan Affairs Office; 2018–2022 | Succeeded by Song Tao |
Party political offices
| Preceded by Zhang Zhijun | Director of the Taiwan Work Office of the CCP Central Committee; 2018–2022 | Succeeded by Song Tao |
