= Qin Huasun =

PRC politician and spokesperson

- 秦华孙
- Qin in 1995

Permanent Representative of China to the United Nations
- In office May 1995 – February 2000
- Preceded by: Li Zhaoxing
- Succeeded by: Wang Yingfan

Assistant Minister of Foreign Affairs
- In office March 1993 – February 1995
- Minister: Qian Qichen

Personal details
- Born: September 1935 Gaoyou, Jiangsu, China
- Died: 3 February 2017 (aged 81) Beijing, China
- Party: Chinese Communist Party
- Education: China Foreign Affairs University
- Occupation: Diplomat

Qin Huasun (Chinese: 秦华孙; September 1935 – 3 February 2017) was a Chinese diplomat who served as the Permanent Representative of China to the United Nations from 1995 to 2000 and Assistant Minister of Foreign Affairs from 1993 to 1995.

== Early life ==
Born in 1935 in the city of Gaoyou in Jiangsu, Qin graduated from China Foreign Affairs University in 1961 and in the same year, joined the Ministry of Foreign Affairs.

== Diplomatic career ==
In 1961, he was assigned to the Information Department of the ministry and served till 1969. From 1971 to 1980, he served as third secretary and then second secretary at the Embassy of China in Sierra Leone. After returning to China, Qin served as the director and later counsellor of the Information Department, for four years.

Qin was appointed as the deputy permanent representative and counselor of the Chinese Mission to the United Nations Office at Geneva, Switzerland in 1984, and from 1987 to 1990, he served as the permanent representative, ambassador, and party secretary of the Chinese Mission to the United Nations Office at Vienna, Austria. From 1990 to 1993, he served as the Director General of the Department of International Organizations and Conferences within the ministry and in 1993, he was appointed as the Assistant Minister of Foreign Affairs.

=== Permanent Representative of China to the United Nations ===
Qin was appointed as the Permanent Representative of China to the United Nations in July 1995, succeeding Li Zhaoxing. During his tenure, in January 1997, China vetoed a UN Security Council resolution which would have sent United Nations peacekeeping forces to Guatemala to monitor a peace agreement which bought an end to the Guatemalan Civil War due to the Guatemalan government inviting Taiwanese officials to the peace ceremony and Taiwan's diplomatic ties with Guatemala. China again used its veto in February 1999 to block sending United Nations peacekeeping forces to Macedonia after Macedonia established diplomatic ties with Taiwan. These two vetoes were the fourth and fifth vetoes used by China in the Security Council. Qin was elected as a member of the National Committee of the Chinese People's Political Consultative Conference and became a member of the foreign affairs committee in March 1998.

When 11 countries which had diplomatic ties with Taiwan endorsed Taiwan's bid to the United Nations on 24 July 1998, Qin wrote a letter to then United Nations Secretary General Kofi Annan where he criticized the countries for their "brazen attempt [...] at splitting a sovereign state". On 7 May 1999, during the NATO bombing of Yugoslavia when the Chinese embassy in Belgrade, Yugoslavia, was bombed by the United States, resulting in the deaths of three Chinese nationals, Qin termed the bombing "barbarian" and convened an emergency Security Council meeting in response to the bombing. His tenure also saw humanitarian crises in Burundi, Kosovo and East Timor. He stepped down as permanent representative in February 2000.

== Later life ==
Qin retired in 2004. In 2010, he published his book Ambassador's Memoir: Representing China in the UN, which recounted his experiences as permanent representative. He died of illness at the age of 81, on 3 February 2017.

Diplomatic posts
Preceded by Li Zhaoxing	Permanent Representative and Ambassador of China to the United Nations; 1995–2000	Succeeded by Wang Yingfan
