= Ling Qing =

Chinese diplomat

Ling Qing (Chinese: 凌青) (1923 – September 10, 2010), original name Lin Moqing (Chinese: 林墨卿), was a Chinese diplomat. He was born in Fuzhou, Fujian. He was a descendant of Lin Zexu. He was a graduate of Beijing No. 4 High School and Yenching University. He was Ambassador of the People's Republic of China to Venezuela and Permanent Representative of China to the United Nations (1980–1985). He was a member of the 8th Chinese People's Political Consultative Conference.

Preceded by New office	Ambassador of the P.R.China to Venezuela; 1975–1978	Succeeded by Zheng Weizhi
Preceded by Chen Chu	Permanent Representative of the People's Republic of China to the United Nations; 1980–1985	Succeeded by Li Luye
