= Chen Xiaogong =

Chinese general

- 陈小工

Deputy Commander of the PLA Air Force
- In office February 2009 – January 2013
- Commander: Xu Qiliang; Ma Xiaotian

Personal details
- Born: August 1949 (age 77) Weihai, Shandong, China
- Party: Chinese Communist Party
- Education: Jilin University

Military service
- Allegiance: China
- Branch/service: People's Liberation Army Air Force
- Years of service: 1968–2013
- Rank: Lieutenant General
- Battles/wars: Sino-Vietnamese War

Chen Xiaogong (Chinese: 陈小工; born August 1949) is a retired lieutenant general (zhong jiang) of the People's Liberation Army Air Force (PLAAF) of China. He served as Deputy Commander of the PLAAF from 2009 to 2013, and the PLA's intelligence chief from 2003 to 2007.

== Biography ==
Chen Xiaogong was born in August 1949 in Weihai, Shandong Province. He is the son of Chen Chu, the first PRC ambassador to Japan. He joined the PLA in February 1969, and the Chinese Communist Party in January 1970. He graduated from Jilin University with a degree in world history.

He was PLA defense attaché in Washington (2001) and then the PLA's intelligence chief (director of the Second Department of the PLA General Staff Department). He represented the PLA as deputy director of the Politburo's Foreign Affairs Leading Small Group (FALSG) Office and was appointed assistant chief of general staff in 2007, temporarily filling the vacancy left by General Xiong Guangkai.

Chen belonged to the PLA category of "cadre to be rescued" (抢救干部), a commander with a distinctive service record who, due to lack of a compulsory experience or lack of a vacancy, is transferred elsewhere as a way of promotion. Without experience as a commanding officer at or above divisional level (军事主官), he was unable to become deputy chief of the PLA General Staff Department. He was thus transferred to the PLAAF in 2009 as deputy commander even though the PLAAF had already filled its four deputy-commander quota.

As the fifth deputy commander of the PLAAF, he was in charge of intelligence, training safety, and foreign affairs. He was probably the only senior commander in the PLAAF with battlefield combat experience, having fought in the Sino-Vietnam War as a battalion commander.

Chen attained the rank of major general in July 1999 and lieutenant general in July 2008. He was a member of the 11th National People's Congress. He retired from military service in January 2013.
