= Song Zhe =

Chinese diplomat

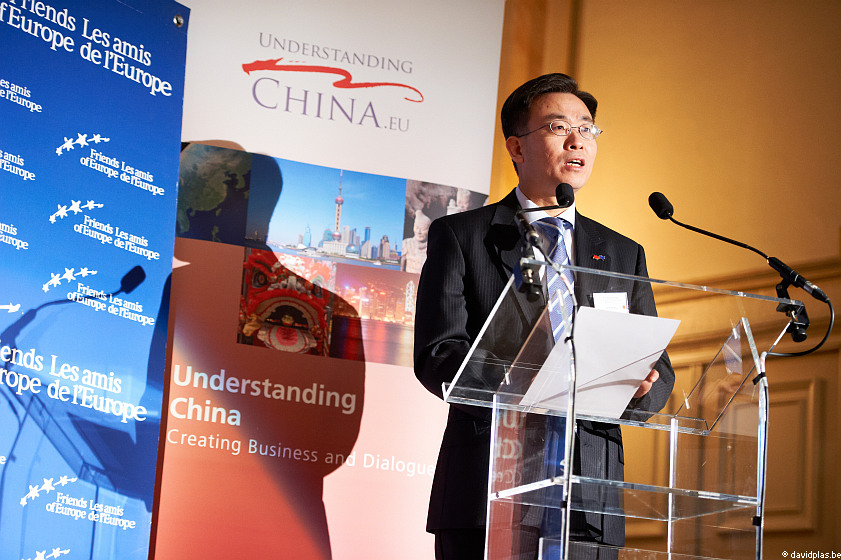
Song Zhe

Song Zhe (Chinese: 宋哲) is a diplomat of the People's Republic of China.

He is standing director-general of “The Department of West European Affairs”. From 1 March 2008 to 2012, Song was the Ambassador of the People's Republic of China to the European Union.

In July 2010, Song was reported by the news website EU Observer to say that some EU political leaders were becoming more respectful of China's views on Human Rights, but also that China was refusing to support a UN Security Council resolution condemning Syria because "the principle we uphold is to respect the will of the country to choose its own path of development."
