= Ambassador of China to the European Union =

Coordinates: 50.854374°N 4.443590°E

- National emblem of China

- Flag of China
- Ministry of Foreign Affairs
- Appointer: The president pursuant to a decision of the National People's Congress Standing Committee
- Inaugural holder: Li Lien-Pi
- Formation: September 16, 1975

The Chinese ambassador to the European Union is the official representative of the government of the People's Republic of China to the European Union.

== List of representatives ==
Ambassadors of the People's Republic of China to the European Communities
Name	Term		Notes
Name	Start	End	Notes
Li Lien-Pi	September 16, 1975		Concurrently ambassador to Belgium and Luxembourg
Huan Xiang	January 1976	September 1978	Concurrently ambassador to Belgium and Luxembourg
Guan Chengyuan (关呈远)	August 2001	February 2008	
Song Zhe (宋哲)	March 2008	January 2012	
Wu Hailong (吴海龙)	February 2012	January 2014	
Yang Yanyi (杨燕怡)	January 2014	September 2017	
Zhang Ming (张明)	October 2017	December 2021	
Fu Cong (傅聪)	December 16, 2022	March 25, 2024	
Cai Run	September 2024		

== See also ==
- China–European Union relations
- List of ambassadors of the European Union to China
