= Zhou Wenzhong =

Chinese diplomat and politician

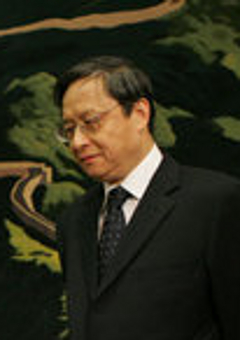
Zhou Wenzhong

Zhou Wenzhong (Chinese: 周文重; born August 1945) is a diplomat and politician of the People's Republic of China. He served as ambassador to the United States from 2005 to 2010, and deputy foreign minister from 2003 to 2005.

== Biography ==
Zhou Wenzhong is a native of Jiangsu province. He was born in 1945 and attended the University of Bath and the London School of Economics in the UK. Zhou was Ambassador to Barbados and to Antigua and Barbuda from 1990 to 1993. From 1998 to 2001, he served as Ambassador to the Commonwealth of Australia. He held leading posts at the Ministry of Foreign Affairs, where he served as deputy director of the American Affairs Department until 1994. In 2001 he was promoted as assistant minister and in 2003 he became vice-minister of the Ministry of Foreign Affairs. In 2005, Zhou Wenzhong became Ambassador Extraordinary and Plenipotentiary of the People's Republic of China to the United States. In 2010, Zhou became Secretary-General at Boao Forum for Asia, and vice-president at China-US People's Friendship Association.
