= Li Zhaoxing =

Chinese diplomat and politician

- 李肇星
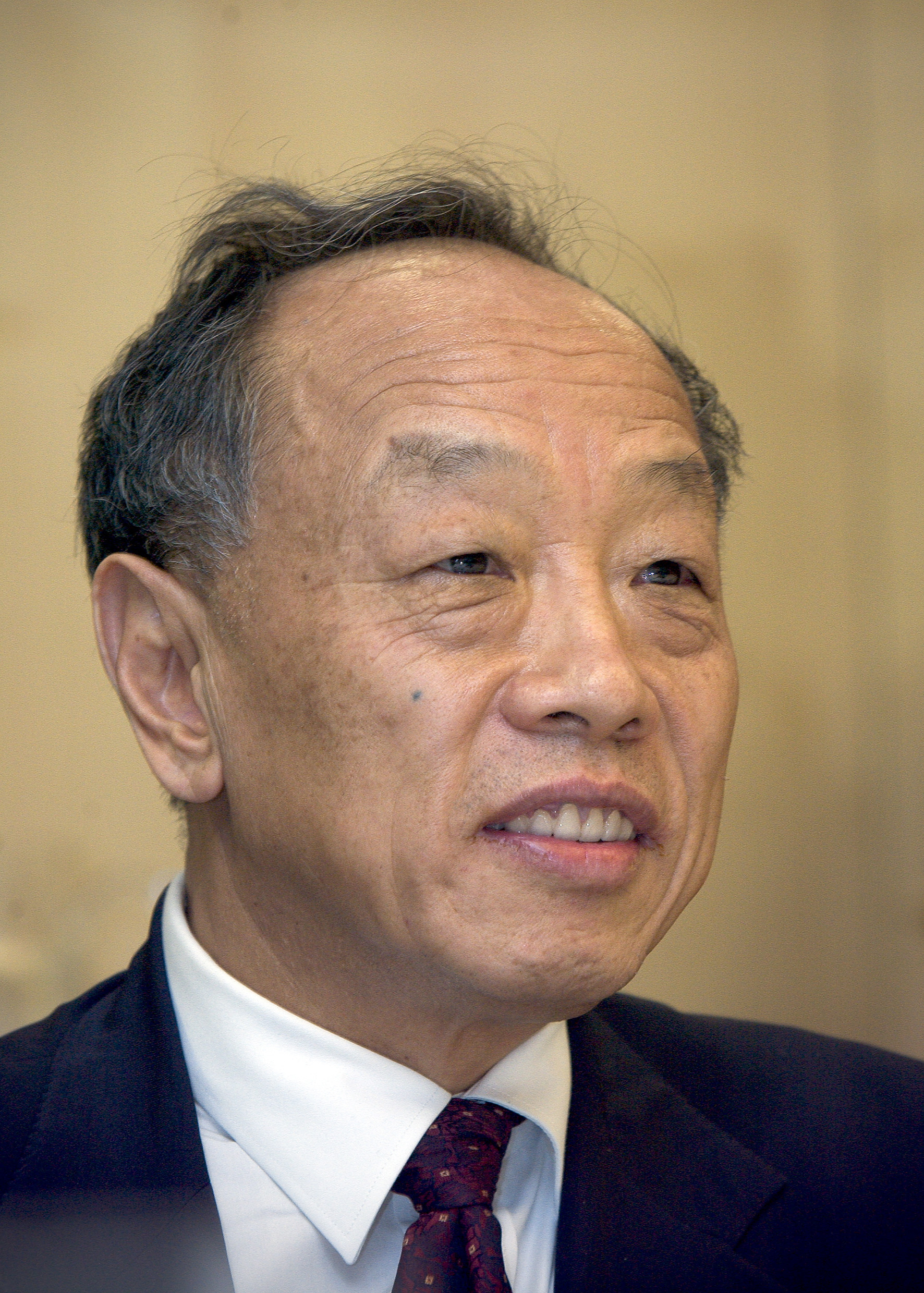
- Li in 2005

9th Minister of Foreign Affairs
- In office 17 March 2003 – 27 April 2007
- Premier: Wen Jiabao
- Preceded by: Tang Jiaxuan
- Succeeded by: Yang Jiechi

Vice Minister of Foreign Affairs
- In office 2001–2003
- Minister: Tang Jiaxuan
- In office 1995–1998
- Minister: Qian Qichen

Chinese Ambassador to the United States
- In office 11 March 1998 – 30 January 2001
- Preceded by: Li Daoyu
- Succeeded by: Yang Jiechi

Permanent Representative of China to the United Nations
- In office March 1993 – May 1995
- Preceded by: Li Daoyu
- Succeeded by: Qin Huasun

Personal details
- Born: 20 October 1940 (age 85) Jiaonan, Shandong, Japanese-occupied China (now Huangdao, Shandong, China)
- Party: Chinese Communist Party
- Spouse: Qin Xiaomei
- Children: Li Hehe (son)
- Relatives: Qin Feng (niece-in-law)
- Education: Peking University

Li Zhaoxing (Chinese: 李肇星; pinyin: Lǐ Zhàoxīng; born 20 October 1940) is a Chinese diplomat and politician who served as Minister of Foreign Affairs of China from 2003 to 2007. He previously served as Ambassador of China to the United States from 1998 to 2001, Permanent Representative of China to the United Nations from 1993 to 1995, and deputy director and director of information department at Ministry of Foreign Affairs from 1985 to 1993.

== Early life ==
Li was born in Jiaonan County in Qingdao, Shandong. He studied at the Department of Western Languages at Peking University and after graduation in 1964, he was selected to study at Beijing Foreign Studies University. After graduation, he entered the Chinese People's Institute of Foreign Affairs. Following the start of Cultural Revolution, he was forced to drop out of the institute and work in cadre schools and farms in Shanxi, Jiangxi, Hunan, Hebei and Guangdong Provinces. During his time in Guangdong, he experienced Typhoon Viola in 1969.

== Early career (1970–2001) ==
After being reinstated into the Ministry of Foreign Affairs of the People's Republic of China in 1970, he was assigned as a staff and attaché with the Chinese Embassy in Kenya. In 1977, he was appointed staff member and deputy director of the Information Department within the ministry, serving until 1983. From 1983 to 1985, he served as a first secretary at the Embassy of China in the Kingdom of Lesotho. Li considered his diplomatic work in Africa as "may be the most energetic days and months in my life."

Li returned to China in 1985 and served successively as deputy director, director and spokesperson of the Information Department in the ministry. In 1990, he was promoted to Assistant Minister of Foreign Affairs and in 1993, he was appointed Permanent Representative of China to the United Nations. Two years later, he was promoted to Vice Foreign Minister. In 1998, he was appointed Chinese Ambassador to the United States. During his tenure as ambassador, the relations between China and the United States were strained heavily during the NATO bombing of Yugoslavia when the Chinese embassy in Belgrade, Yugoslavia, was bombed by the United States during the NATO bombing on 7 May 1999, killing three Chinese nationals. In response to incident, Li called the incident an "horrifying atrocity" and demanded that NATO investigate the incident. On 13 May, after President of the United States Bill Clinton issued a public apology for the incident, Li was present at the Oval Office in the White House when Clinton signed the official condolence book. Following the end of his tenure as ambassador in 2001, the Mayor of Washington D.C. Anthony A. Williams declared 29 January 2001, which was Li's last day in office as ambassador, as "Li Zhaoxing Day", in recognition of Li's efforts in fostering China-United States relations.

In 2001, following his return from the United States, Li was appointed Vice-Minister. In April 2001, in response to U.S. arms sale to Taiwan, Li said that the "Chinese side strongly urges the U.S. side to recognize the serious, harmful and dangerous nature of U.S. arms sales to Taiwan." On the same month, when asked about the return of the U.S. Navy P-3 Orion surveillance aircraft which made emergency landing on Hainan Island during the Hainan Island incident, he stated that "if we allow such a military plane, which had a mission of spying on China, to be flown back out of China, that will further hurt the dignity and sentiments of the Chinese people." Eventually, the Chinese allowed the aircraft to be returned to the United States in July 2001.

== Foreign minister (2003–2007) ==
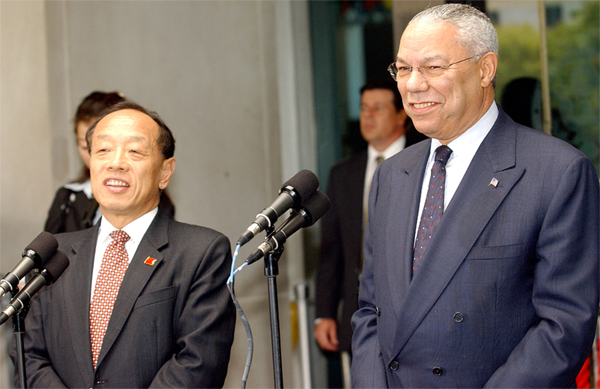
Li meeting with U.S. Secretary of State Colin Powell (2004)

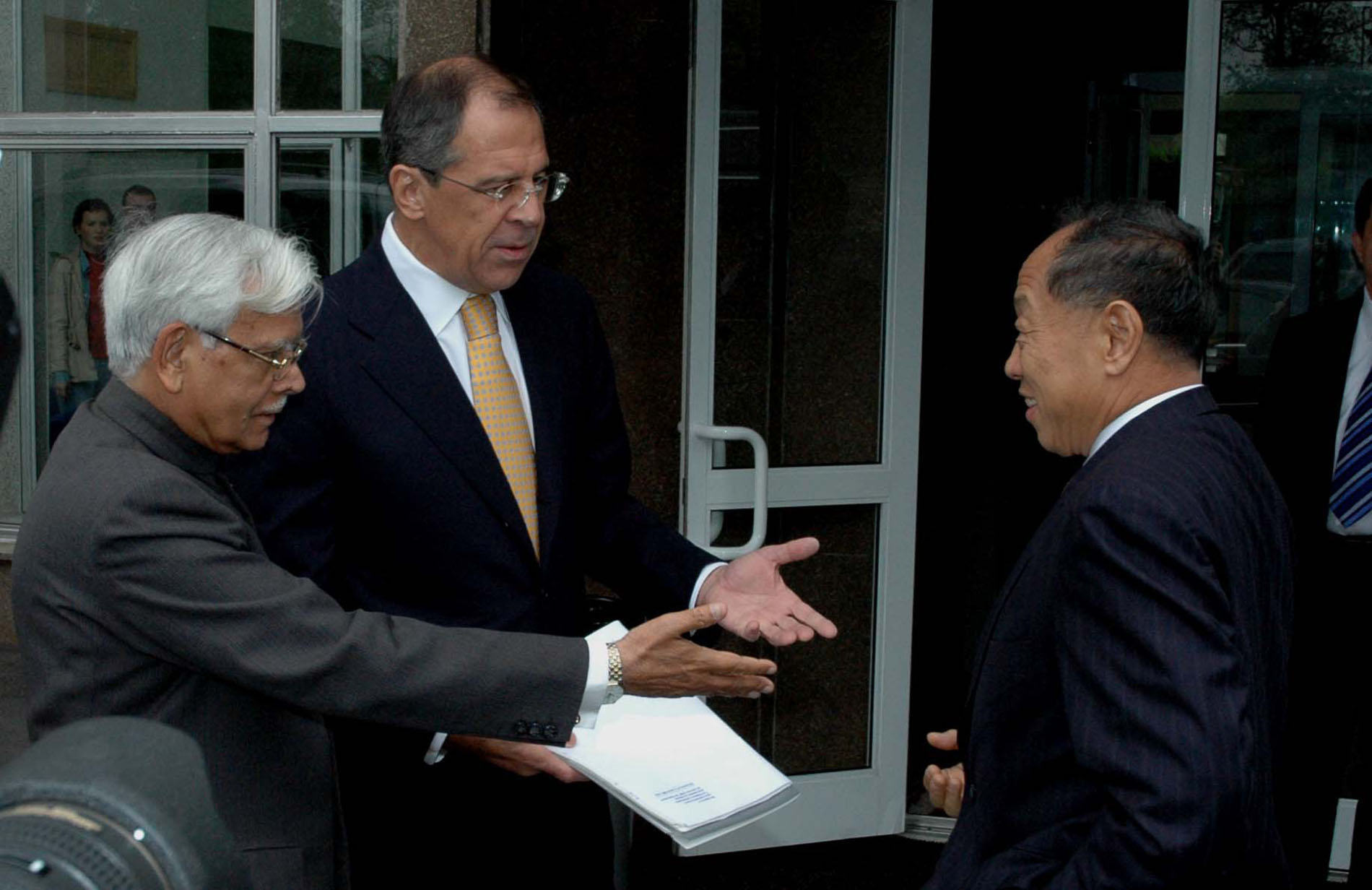
Li meeting with the Minister of External Affairs of India Natwar Singh and Russian Foreign Minister Sergei Lavrov in Vladivostok, Russia (2005)

The National People's Congress appointed Li the new Minister of Foreign Affairs on 16 March 2003, succeeding Tang Jiaxuan. On the same day after being made the Minister of Foreign Affairs, the threat of military action against Iraq by the United States and United Kingdom loomed. As a result, Li made a last-ditch effort to avoid the war from happening by urging peaceful resolution by in phone calls to American, British and Russian officials, stating that the "common wish of the international community is for peace instead of war." On 18 March, Li reiterated that "that a war against Iraq can be avoided and the crisis can be solved within the U.N. framework by political means." When the war began on 20 March, the Chinese Foreign Ministry issued a statement on the "political settlement of the Iraq issue within the UN framework, urging the Iraqi Government to fully and earnestly implement relevant Security Council resolutions and calling for respect for Iraq's sovereignty and territorial integrity by the international community" and "war will inevitably lead to humanitarian disasters and undermine the security, stability and development of the region and the world at large." On 24 March, in a phone call with Russian Foreign Minister Igor Ivanov, Li appealed for cessation of military operations and expressed concern of the humanitarian catastrophe caused by the war.

Li met with North Korean leader Kim Jong Il in Pyongyang, North Korea in March 2004, as part of international diplomacy in dealing with North Korea's nuclear weapons programme. In April 2005, following the outbreak of 2005 anti-Japanese demonstrations in China in response to the approval of a Japanese history textbook and the proposal that Japan be granted a permanent seat on the United Nations Security Council, Li met with Japanese Foreign Minister Nobutaka Machimura in Beijing. During the meeting, Li stated the "Chinese government has never done anything for which it has to apologise to the Japanese people" and "the main problem now is the Japanese government has done a series of things that have hurt the feelings of the Chinese people, on the Taiwan issue, some international issues including human rights and especially in its treatment of history."

In August 2007, following Taiwanese President Chen Shui-bian's advocacy of Taiwanese independence, Li said to a group of Taiwanese journalists at a press briefing not to listen to "local [Taiwanese] leaders" and that "whoever wants to split away will become a criminal in history."

He stepped down as Minister of Foreign Affairs in April 2007 and was succeeded by Yang Jiechi. According to leaked US embassy cables, it was alleged that then Chinese President Hu Jintao had Li fired following Hu's 2006 visit to the United States which saw numerous debacles such as no state dinner at the White House, lack of national flags flying between the Blair House and the White House, the presence of Falun Gong protestor at the White House lawn and the national anthem of the People's Republic of China referred as the anthem of the Republic of China.

During his 40 year tenure in the Ministry of Foreign Affairs, Li published over 200 poems and was nicknamed "poet minister". However, due to his firm stance on the political status of Taiwan, coupled with his personal image, some people have referred to him as "the minister with a bad temper". Some Taiwanese media considered his rhetoric to be arrogant and in some diplomatic circles, he was often seen as lacking in diplomatic demeanor, with some even referring to him as the "Red Guard Ambassador" or the "Fighting Cock".

== Later career ==
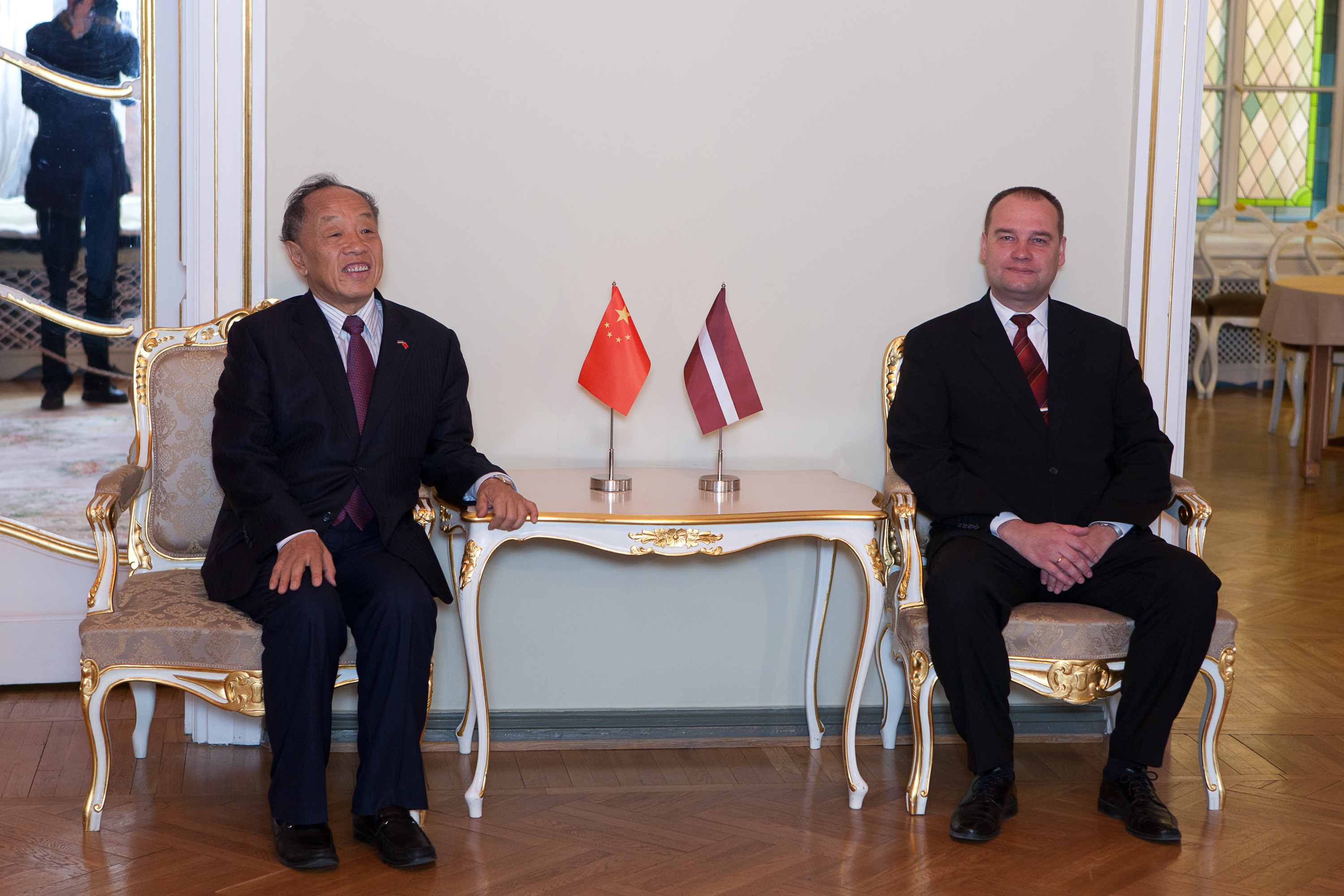
Li meeting with Latvian politician and Speaker of the Saeima Gundars Daudze (2011)

After stepping down as Minister of Foreign Affairs, Li was appointed chairman of the Foreign Affairs Committee of the National People's Congress and a member of the 11th National People's Congress in 2008. He retired in March 2013. He was initially appointed one of the Elders but chose not to continue with the role. He served as a professor at Peking University.

Li was appointed the president of China Public Diplomacy Association in 2012, a position he would serve till 2019. On 5 March 2012, at a press conference of the National People's Congress, Li stated that China does not have direct elections as China is too big and some places have inconvenient transportation so direct elections are inconvenient. He was ridiculed for his comments by netizens.

In January 2022, he joined the Chinese video platform Bilibili. In his first video published in the platform, he spoke of his life and diplomatic experiences, and concluded the video by remarking on a quote made by Confucius: "When I walk with two others, they may serve as my teachers." Li was the Chinese representative for the 7th China–Australia High-Level Dialogue held in Beijing in September 2023, the first such summit in three years.

== Personal life ==
Li is married to Qin Xiaomei, who also served as a diplomat. Qin's father served as secretary to former President of China Liu Shaoqi and as head of the Consular Department of the Ministry of Foreign Affairs. Li's son Li Hehe is a graduate of Harvard University and University of Pennsylvania who founded a network which exclusively handles queries of China's CET-4 and CET-6 exam scores.

His niece-in-law Qin Feng worked as a reporter for Phoenix Television and has interviewed Chinese politicians.

== Awards ==
- Central African Republic:
  - Grand Officer of the Order of Central African Merit (6 January 2007)
- Mexico:
  - Sash of the Order of the Aztec Eagle (16 November 2006)

Diplomatic posts
Preceded by Li Daoyu	Ambassador of China to the United Nations; 1993–1995	Succeeded by Qin Huasun
Preceded by Li Daoyu	Ambassador of China to the United States; 1998–2001	Succeeded by Yang Jiechi
Political offices
Preceded by Tang Jiaxuan	Minister of Foreign Affairs; 2003–2007	Succeeded by Yang Jiechi
