= August 20 =

August 20 this year in various calendars
- Thursday, 20 August 2026
Akan	Monoyaw
Armenian	1 Hoṙi 1476
Aztec	Atemoztli 2, 2 Itzcuintli
Babylonian	6 Abu, 2337 SE
Balinese pawukon	Menga, Kajeng, Menala, Wage, Maulu, Wraspati of Medangkungan, Uma, Dadi, Suka
Bengali	5 Bhadro, BS 1433
Chinese	Yang Fire Tiger・Horn Mansion; Fire Horse Year, Month 7, Day 8 (Liqiu, 3 days until Chushu)
Common Era	20 August 2026 CE
Coptic	14 Mesori, AM 1742
Egyptian	6 Tybi, 2775 NE
Ethiopian	14 Naḥasē, 2018 Amätä Məhrät
French Republican	Décade I, Tridi de Fructidor de l'Année 234 de la République
Gregorian	20 August, AD 2026
Hebrew	7 Elul, AM 5786
Hindu	Viśākhā・Brahman; Solar: 4 Bhādrapada, 1948 SE; Lunisolar: Aṣṭamī, Śukla pakṣa of Śrāvaṇa, 2083 VE; Rāudra・5127 KY・1,872,807
Icelandic	Fimmtudagur, 26 Heyannir 2026
Islamic	6 Rabi' al-awwal, AH 1448 (using tabular method)
ISO week date	2026-W34-4
Japanese	8 Fumizuki, Reiwa 8 (Risshū, 3 days until Shosho)
Julian	7 August, AD 2026 (AM 7534)
Julian day	2461273
Korean	8 Wonsungidal, 4359 DE
Maya	13.0.13.15.10; 3 Mol, 2 Oc
Roman	ante diem VII Idus Augustas, MMDCCLXXIX AUC
Solar Hijri	29 Mordad, SH 1405
Tibetan	8 gro bzhin, me pho rta 2153 or 1772 or 1000

<<	August					>>
Su	Mo	Tu	We	Th	Fr	Sa
						1
2	3	4	5	6	7	8
9	10	11	12	13	14	15
16	17	18	19	20	21	22
23	24	25	26	27	28	29
30	31
2026

August 20 in recent years
2026 (Thursday)
2025 (Wednesday)
2024 (Tuesday)
2023 (Sunday)
2022 (Saturday)
2021 (Friday)
2020 (Thursday)
2019 (Tuesday)
2018 (Monday)
2017 (Sunday)

August 20 is the 232nd day of the year (233rd in leap years) in the Gregorian calendar; 133 days remain until the end of the year.

== Events ==
=== Pre-1600 ===
- AD 14 – Agrippa Postumus, maternal grandson of the late Roman emperor Augustus, is executed by his guards while in exile.
- 636 –Battle of the Yarmuk: Marking the first great wave of Muslim conquests and the rapid advance of Islam outside Arabia, Arab forces led by Khalid ibn al-Walid defeat the Byzantine Empire and take control of the Levant.
- 917 – Battle of Acheloos: Tsar Simeon I of Bulgaria decisively defeats a Byzantine army.
- 1057 – An army under Isaac I Komnenos defeat forces loyal to rival emperor Michael VI Bringas in the battle of Hades.
- 1083 – The first King of Hungary, Stephen I, and his son, Prince Emeric, are canonized, a date now celebrated as a National Day in Hungary.
- 1119 – King Henry I of England defeats king Louis VI of France in the battle of Brémule.
- 1191 – Believing Saladin had reneged on ransom promises, Richard I of England initiates the massacre at Ayyadieh, beheading 2,700 captive Muslim soldiers and another 300 women and children seized at the Fall of Acre.
- 1308 – At the conclusion of the interrogation of the leaders of the Knights Templar, the three papal investigators, Cardinals Bérenger Frédol, Etienne de Suisy and Landolfo Brancacci, write the "Chinon Parchment", in which they affirm that the accused Templars had confessed, done penance, and were absolved of heresy.
- 1467 – The Second Battle of Olmedo takes places as part of a succession conflict between Henry IV of Castile and his half-brother Alfonso, Prince of Asturias.
- 1519 – On the third day of battle, philosopher and general Wang Yangming defeats Zhu Chenhao, ending the Prince of Ning rebellion against the reign of the Ming dynasty's Zhengde Emperor.

=== 1601–1900 ===
- 1648 – The Battle of Lens is the last major military confrontation of the Thirty Years' War, contributing to the signing of the Peace of Westphalia in October that year.
- 1672 – Former Grand Pensionary Johan de Witt and his brother Cornelis are lynched by a mob in The Hague.
- 1707 – The first Siege of Pensacola comes to an end with the failure of the British to capture Pensacola, Florida.
- 1710 – War of the Spanish Succession: A multinational army led by the Austrian commander Guido Starhemberg defeats the Spanish-Bourbon army commanded by Alexandre Maître, Marquis de Bay in the Battle of Saragossa.
- 1775 – The Spanish establish the Presidio San Augustin del Tucson in the town that became Tucson, Arizona.
- 1794 – Northwest Indian War: United States troops force the United Indian Nations, a confederacy of Shawnee, Mingo, Lenape, Wyandot, Miami, Odawa, Ojibwe, and Potawatomi warriors, into a disorganized retreat at the Battle of Fallen Timbers.
- 1852 – Steamboat Atlantic sinks on Lake Erie after a collision, with the loss of at least 150 lives.
- 1858 – Charles Darwin first publishes his theory of evolution through natural selection in The Journal of the Proceedings of the Linnean Society of London, alongside Alfred Russel Wallace's same theory.
- 1864 – Bakumatsu: Kinmon incident: The Chōshū Domain attempts to expel the Satsuma and Aizu Domains from Japan's imperial court.
- 1866 – President Andrew Johnson formally declares the American Civil War over.
- 1882 – Tchaikovsky's 1812 Overture debuts in Moscow, Russia.

=== 1901–present ===
- 1905 – Sun Yat-sen, Song Jiaoren, and others establish the Tongmenghui, a Republican, anti-Qing revolutionary organisation, in Tokyo, Japan.
- 1910 – Extreme fire weather in the Inland Northwest of the United States causes many small wildfires to coalesce into the Great Fire of 1910, burning approximately 3 million acres (12,000 km^{2}) and killing 87 people.
- 1914 – World War I: Brussels is captured during the German invasion of Belgium.
- 1920 – The first commercial radio station, 8MK (now WWJ), begins operations in Detroit.
- 1920 – The National Football League is organized as the American Professional Football Conference in Canton, Ohio.
- 1926 – Japan's public broadcasting company, Nippon Hōsō Kyōkai (NHK) is established.
- 1940 – In Mexico City, exiled Russian revolutionary Leon Trotsky is fatally wounded with an ice axe by Ramón Mercader. He dies the next day.
- 1940 – World War II: British Prime Minister Winston Churchill makes the fourth of his famous wartime speeches, containing the line "Never was so much owed by so many to so few".
- 1940 – World War II: The Eighth Route Army launches the Hundred Regiments Offensive, a successful campaign to disrupt Japanese war infrastructure and logistics in occupied northern China.
- 1944 – World War II: One hundred sixty-eight captured allied airmen, including Phil Lamason, accused by the Gestapo of being "terror fliers", arrive at Buchenwald concentration camp.
- 1944 – World War II: The Battle of Romania begins with a major Soviet Union offensive.
- 1948 – Soviet Consul General in New York, Jacob M. Lomakin is expelled by the United States, due to the Kasenkina Case.
- 1949 – Hungary adopts the Hungarian Constitution of 1949 and becomes a People's Republic.
- 1955 – Battle of Philippeville: In Algeria, a force of Berbers from the Atlas Mountains region of Algeria raid two rural settlements and kill 77 French nationals.
- 1960 – Senegal breaks from the Mali Federation, declaring its independence.
- 1962 – The NS Savannah, the world's first nuclear-powered civilian ship, embarks on its maiden voyage.
- 1968 – Cold War: Warsaw Pact troops invade Czechoslovakia, crushing the Prague Spring. East German participation is limited to a few specialists due to memories of the recent war. Only Albania and Romania refuse to participate.
- 1975 – Viking program: NASA launches the Viking 1 planetary probe toward Mars.
- 1975 – ČSA Flight 540 crashes on approach to Damascus International Airport in Damascus, Syria, killing 126 people.
- 1977 – Voyager program: NASA launches the Voyager 2 spacecraft.
- 1986 – In Edmond, Oklahoma, U.S. Postal employee Patrick Sherrill shoots and kills 14 of his co-workers and then commits suicide.
- 1988 – "Black Saturday" of the Yellowstone fire in Yellowstone National Park.
- 1988 – Iran–Iraq War: A ceasefire is agreed after almost eight years of war.
- 1988 – The Troubles: Eight British soldiers are killed and 28 wounded when their bus is hit by an IRA roadside bomb in Ballygawley, County Tyrone.
- 1989 – The pleasure boat Marchioness sinks on the River Thames following a collision. Fifty-one people are killed.
- 1991 – Dissolution of the Soviet Union, August Coup: More than 100,000 people rally outside the Soviet Union's parliament building protesting the coup aiming to depose President Mikhail Gorbachev.
- 1991 – Estonia, occupied by and incorporated into the Soviet Union in 1940, issues a decision on the re-establishment of independence on the basis of legal continuity of its pre-occupation statehood.
- 1992 – In India, Meitei language (officially known as Manipuri language) is included in the scheduled languages' list and made one of the official languages of the Indian Government.
- 1995 – The Firozabad rail disaster kills 358 people in Firozabad, India.
- 1997 – Souhane massacre in Algeria; over 60 people are killed and 15 kidnapped.
- 1998 – The Supreme Court of Canada rules that Quebec cannot legally secede from Canada without the federal government's approval.
- 1998 – U.S. embassy bombings: The United States launches cruise missile attacks against alleged al-Qaeda camps in Afghanistan and a suspected chemical weapons plant in Sudan in retaliation for the August 7 bombings of American embassies in Kenya and Tanzania.
- 2002 – A group of Iraqis opposed to the regime of Saddam Hussein take over the Iraqi embassy in Berlin, Germany for five hours before releasing their hostages and surrendering.
- 2006 – Sri Lankan Civil War: Sri Lankan Tamil politician and former MP S. Sivamaharajah is shot dead at his home in Tellippalai.
- 2007 – China Airlines Flight 120 catches fire and explodes after landing at Naha Airport in Okinawa, Japan.
- 2008 – Spanair Flight 5022, from Madrid, Spain to Gran Canaria, skids off the runway and crashes at Barajas Airport. Of the 172 people on board, 146 die immediately, and eight more later die of injuries sustained in the crash.
- 2011 – First Air Flight 6560 crashes 1 mile (1.6 km) from the Resolute Bay runway, killing 12 of the 15 aboard.
- 2012 – A prison riot in the Venezuelan capital, Caracas, kills at least 20 people.
- 2014 – Seventy-two people are killed in Japan's Hiroshima Prefecture by a series of landslides caused by a month's worth of rain that fell in one day.
- 2016 – Fifty-four people are killed when a suicide bomber detonates himself at a Kurdish wedding party in Gaziantep, Turkey.
- 2020 – Joe Biden gives his acceptance speech virtually for the 2020 Democratic presidential nomination at the 2020 Democratic National Convention.

== Births ==
=== Pre-1600 ===
- 1377 – Shahrukh Mirza, ruler of Persia and Transoxiania (died 1447)
- 1517 – Antoine Perrenot de Granvelle, French cardinal and art collector (died 1586)
- 1561 – Jacopo Peri, Italian singer and composer (died 1633)

=== 1601–1900 ===
- 1625 – Thomas Corneille, French playwright and philologist (died 1709)
- 1632 – Louis Bourdaloue, French preacher and academic (died 1704)
- 1659 – Henry Every, English pirate (died 1696)
- 1710 – Thomas Simpson, English mathematician and academic (died 1761)
- 1719 – Christian Mayer, Czech astronomer and educator (died 1783)
- 1720 – Bernard de Bury, French harpsichord player and composer (died 1785)
- 1778 – Bernardo O'Higgins, Chilean general and politician, 2nd Supreme Director of Chile (died 1842)
- 1779 – Jöns Jacob Berzelius, Swedish chemist and academic (died 1848)
- 1785 – Oliver Hazard Perry, American Naval hero (died 1819)
- 1799 – James Prinsep, English orientalist and scholar (died 1840)
- 1833 – Benjamin Harrison, American general, lawyer, and politician, 23rd President of the United States (died 1901)
- 1845 – Albert Chmielowski, Polish saint, founded the Albertine Brothers (died 1916)
- 1847 – Andrew Greenwood, English cricketer (died 1889)
- 1847 – Bolesław Prus, Polish journalist and author (died 1912)
- 1856 – Jakub Bart-Ćišinski, German poet and playwright (died 1909)
- 1857 – George Griffith, British writer (died 1906)
- 1860 – Raymond Poincaré, French lawyer and politician, 10th President of France (died 1934)
- 1865 – Bernard Tancred, South African cricketer and lawyer (died 1911)
- 1868 – Ellen Roosevelt, American tennis player (died 1954)
- 1873 – Eliel Saarinen, Finnish architect and academic, co-designed the National Museum of Finland (died 1950)
- 1881 – Edgar Guest, English-American poet and author (died 1959)
- 1881 – Aleksander Hellat, Estonian politician, 6th Estonian Minister of Foreign Affairs (died 1943)
- 1884 – Rudolf Bultmann, German Lutheran theologian and professor of New Testament at the University of Marburg (died 1976)
- 1885 – Dino Campana, Italian poet and author (died 1932)
- 1886 – Paul Tillich, German-American philosopher and theologian (died 1965)
- 1887 – Phan Khôi, Vietnamese journalist and scholar (died 1959)
- 1888 – Tôn Đức Thắng, Vietnamese politician, 2nd President of Vietnam (died 1980)
- 1890 – H. P. Lovecraft, American short story writer, editor, novelist (died 1937)
- 1896 – Gostha Pal, Indian footballer (died 1976)
- 1897 – Tarjei Vesaas, Norwegian author and poet (died 1970)
- 1898 – Leopold Infeld, Polish nuclear physicist, writer (died 1968)
- 1898 – Vilhelm Moberg, Swedish historian, journalist, author, and playwright (died 1973)
- 1900 – Freddie Moore, American jazz drummer, washboarder, and singer (died 1992)

=== 1901–present ===
- 1901 – Salvatore Quasimodo, Italian novelist and poet, Nobel Prize laureate (died 1968)
- 1905 – Jean Gebser, German linguist, poet, and philosopher (died 1973)
- 1905 – Mikio Naruse, Japanese director and screenwriter (died 1969)
- 1905 – Jack Teagarden, American singer-songwriter and trombonist (died 1964)
- 1906 – Vidrik Rootare, Estonian chess player (died 1981)
- 1908 – Al López, American baseball player and manager (died 2005)
- 1909 – André Morell, English actor (died 1978)
- 1909 – Alby Roberts, New Zealand cricketer and rugby player (died 1978)
- 1910 – Eero Saarinen, Finnish-American architect and furniture designer, designed the Gateway Arch (died 1961)
- 1913 – Roger Wolcott Sperry, American neuropsychologist and neurobiologist, Nobel Prize laureate (died 1994)
- 1915 – Ivo Rojnica, Croatian-Argentine war crimes suspect, businessman, diplomat, and intelligence agent (died 2007)
- 1916 – Paul Felix Schmidt, Estonian–German chess player and chemist (died 1984)
- 1917 – Terry Sanford, 65th governor of North Carolina (died 1998)
- 1918 – Jacqueline Susann, American actress and author (died 1974)
- 1919 – Walter Bernstein, American screenwriter and producer (died 2021)
- 1919 – Adamantios Androutsopoulos, Greek lawyer, educator and politician, Prime Minister of Greece (died 2000)
- 1920 – H. R. Van Dongen, American illustrator (died 2010)
- 1921 – Keith Froome, Australian rugby league player (died 1978)
- 1921 – Jack Wilson, Australian cricketer (died 1985)
- 1923 – Jim Reeves, American singer-songwriter (died 1964)
- 1926 – Frank Rosolino, American jazz trombonist (died 1978)
- 1927 – Yootha Joyce, English actress (died 1980)
- 1927 – Fred Kavli, Norwegian-American businessman and philanthropist, founded The Kavli Foundation (died 2013)
- 1929 – Kevin Heffernan, Irish footballer and manager (died 2013)
- 1930 – Mario Bernardi, Canadian pianist and conductor (died 2013)
- 1930 – Peter Randall, English sergeant and recipient of the George Cross (died 2007)
- 1931 – Don King, American boxing promoter
- 1932 – Anthony Ainley, English actor (died 2004)
- 1932 – Vasily Aksyonov, Russian physician, author, and academic (died 2009)
- 1933 – Ted Donaldson, American actor (died 2023)
- 1933 – George J. Mitchell, American lieutenant, lawyer, and politician
- 1935 – Ron Paul, American captain, physician, and politician
- 1936 – Hideki Shirakawa, Japanese chemist, engineer, and academic, Nobel Prize laureate
- 1937 – Stelvio Cipriani, Italian composer (died 2018)
- 1937 – Andrei Konchalovsky, Russian director, producer, and screenwriter
- 1938 – Jean-Loup Chrétien, French military officer and astronaut
- 1939 – Fernando Poe Jr., Filipino actor and politician (died 2004)
- 1940 – Rubén Hinojosa, American businessman and politician
- 1941 – Dame Anne Evans, English soprano and actress
- 1941 – Slobodan Milošević, Serbian lawyer and politician, 1st President of Serbia (died 2006)
- 1942 – Isaac Hayes, American singer-songwriter, pianist, producer, and actor (died 2008)
- 1943 – Sylvester McCoy, Scottish actor
- 1944 – Rajiv Gandhi, Indian lawyer and politician, 6th Prime Minister of India (died 1991)
- 1944 – José Wilker, Brazilian actor and director (died 2014)
- 1946 – Mufaddal Saifuddin, 53rd Da'i al-Mutlaq of Fatimid Caliphate
- 1946 – Henryk Broder, Polish-German journalist and author
- 1946 – Connie Chung, American journalist
- 1946 – Laurent Fabius, French politician, 158th Prime Minister of France
- 1946 – Ralf Hütter, German singer and keyboard player
- 1946 – N. R. Narayana Murthy, Indian businessman, co-founded Infosys
- 1947 – Larry Kudlow, American conservative news analyst, economist, and journalist
- 1947 – Alan Lee, English painter and illustrator
- 1947 – James Pankow, American musician
- 1947 – Ray Wise, American actor
- 1948 – John Noble, Australian actor and director
- 1948 – Robert Plant, English singer-songwriter
- 1949 – Nikolas Asimos, Greek singer-songwriter and guitarist (died 1988)
- 1949 – Phil Lynott, Irish singer-songwriter, bass player, and producer (died 1986)
- 1951 – Greg Bear, American author (died 2022)
- 1952 – Doug Fieger, American singer-songwriter and guitarist (died 2010)
- 1952 – John Hiatt, American singer-songwriter and guitarist
- 1953 – Peter Horton, American actor and director
- 1954 – Quinn Buckner, American basketball player and coach
- 1954 – Al Roker, American news anchor, television personality, and author
- 1955 – Agnes Chan, Hong Kong singer and author
- 1956 – Joan Allen, American actress
- 1956 – Alvin Greenidge, Barbadian cricketer
- 1957 – Simon Donaldson, English mathematician and academic
- 1957 – Cindy Nicholas, Canadian swimmer (died 2016)
- 1958 – Patricia Rozema, Canadian director and screenwriter
- 1958 – David O. Russell, American director and screenwriter
- 1960 – Dom Duff, Breton singer-songwriter, guitarist, composer
- 1960 – Sally Yates, American lawyer and former Acting Attorney General
- 1962 – James Marsters, American actor
- 1963 – Uwe Bialon, German footballer and manager
- 1964 – Azarias Ruberwa, Congolese lawyer and politician, Vice-President of the Democratic Republic of the Congo
- 1965 – KRS-One, American rapper and producer
- 1966 – Miguel Albaladejo, Spanish director and screenwriter
- 1966 – Colin Cunningham, American actor
- 1966 – Dimebag Darrell, American guitarist and songwriter (died 2004)
- 1966 – Enrico Letta, Italian lawyer and politician, 55th Prime Minister of Italy
- 1966 – Liu Chunyan, Chinese host and voice actress
- 1968 – Abdelatif Benazzi, Moroccan-French rugby player
- 1968 – Sandy Brondello, Australian basketball player and coach
- 1968 – Klas Ingesson, Swedish footballer and manager (died 2014)
- 1969 – Billy Gardell, American comedian, actor, and producer
- 1969 – Santeri Kinnunen, Finnish actor
- 1970 – Els Callens, Belgian tennis player and sportscaster
- 1970 – Fred Durst, American singer-songwriter
- 1971 – Nenad Bjelica, Croatian footballer and manager
- 1971 – Ke Huy Quan, Vietnamese-American actor
- 1971 – Steve Stone, English footballer and coach
- 1971 – David Walliams, English comedian, actor, and author
- 1972 – Derrick Alston, American basketball player
- 1972 – Scott Quinnell, Welsh rugby player and sportscaster
- 1972 – Anna Umemiya, Japanese model and actress
- 1973 – Alban Bushi, Albanian footballer
- 1973 – Alexandre Finazzi, Brazilian footballer
- 1973 – Scott Goodman, Australian swimmer
- 1973 – Cameron Mather, New Zealand rugby player and sportscaster
- 1974 – Amy Adams, American actress
- 1974 – Misha Collins, American actor
- 1974 – Szabolcs Sáfár, Hungarian footballer and coach
- 1974 – Maxim Vengerov, Russian-Israeli violinist and conductor
- 1975 – Marcin Adamski, Polish footballer and manager
- 1975 – Marko Martin, Estonian pianist and educator
- 1976 – Chris Drury, American ice hockey player
- 1976 – Cornel Frăsineanu, Romanian footballer
- 1976 – Tony Grant, Irish footballer
- 1976 – Kristen Miller, American actress, producer, and screenwriter
- 1976 – Fabio Ulloa, Honduran footballer
- 1977 – Paolo Bianco, Italian footballer
- 1977 – Wayne Brown, English footballer
- 1977 – Felipe Contepomi, Argentine rugby player, coach, and physician
- 1977 – Manuel Contepomi, Argentine rugby player
- 1977 – Stéphane Gillet, Luxembourgish footballer
- 1977 – Aaron Hamill, Australian footballer and coach
- 1977 – Ívar Ingimarsson, Icelandic footballer
- 1977 – James Ormond, English cricketer
- 1977 – Josh Pearce, American baseball player
- 1977 – Aaron Taylor, American baseball player
- 1978 – Alberto Martín, Spanish tennis player
- 1978 – Emir Mkademi, Tunisian footballer
- 1978 – Chris Schroder, American baseball player
- 1979 – Sarah Borwell, English tennis player
- 1979 – Jamie Cullum, English singer-songwriter and pianist
- 1979 – Cory Sullivan, American baseball player
- 1981 – Ben Barnes, English actor
- 1981 – Brett Finch, Australian rugby league player and sportscaster
- 1981 – Artur Kotenko, Estonian footballer
- 1981 – Bernard Mendy, French footballer
- 1981 – Craig Ochs, American football player
- 1981 – Byron Saxton, American wrestler, manager, and sportscaster
- 1982 – Cléber Luis Alberti, Brazilian footballer
- 1982 – Aleksandr Amisulashvili, Georgian footballer
- 1982 – Monty Dumond, South African rugby player
- 1982 – Youssouf Hersi, Ethiopian footballer
- 1982 – Joshua Kennedy, Australian footballer
- 1982 – Mijaín López, Cuban wrestler
- 1982 – Meghan Ory, Canadian actress
- 1982 – Richard Petiot, Canadian ice hockey player
- 1982 – Barney Rogers, Zimbabwean cricketer
- 1982 – Enyelbert Soto, Venezuelan-Japanese baseball player
- 1983 – Paulo André Cren Benini, Brazilian footballer
- 1983 – Andrew Garfield, American-English actor
- 1983 – Héctor Landazuri, Colombian footballer
- 1983 – Yuri Zhirkov, Russian footballer
- 1984 – Aílton José Almeida, Brazilian footballer
- 1984 – Pavel Eismann, Czech footballer
- 1984 – Laura Georges, French footballer
- 1984 – Ingrid Lukas, Estonian-Swiss singer-songwriter and pianist
- 1985 – Brant Daugherty, American actor
- 1985 – Thomas Domingo, French rugby player
- 1985 – Joe Vitale, American ice hockey player
- 1985 – Stephen Ward, Irish footballer
- 1986 – Andrew Surman, South African-English footballer
- 1987 – Stefan Aigner, German footballer
- 1987 – Gunther, Austrian wrestler
- 1987 – Vedran Janjetović, Croatian-Australian footballer
- 1987 – Sido Jombati, Portuguese footballer
- 1987 – Egon Kaur, Estonian race car driver
- 1988 – Jerryd Bayless, American basketball player
- 1988 – Sarah R, Lotfi, American director, producer, and screenwriter
- 1988 – José Zamora, Spanish footballer
- 1989 – Kirko Bangz, American rapper and producer
- 1989 – Silas Kiplagat, Kenyan runner
- 1989 – Slavcho Shokolarov, Bulgarian footballer
- 1989 – Judd Trump, English snooker player
- 1989 – Dean Winnard, English footballer
- 1990 – Macauley Chrisantus, Nigerian footballer
- 1990 – Culoe De Song, South African music producer and DJ
- 1990 – Leigh Griffiths, Scottish footballer
- 1990 – Bradley Klahn, American tennis player
- 1990 – Ranomi Kromowidjojo, Dutch swimmer
- 1991 – Marko Djokovic, Serbian tennis player
- 1991 – Jyrki Jokipakka, Finnish hockey player
- 1991 – Cory Joseph, Canadian basketball player
- 1992 – Carolina Horta, Brazilian beach volleyball player
- 1992 – Demi Lovato, American singer-songwriter and actress
- 1992 – Alex Newell, American actor and singer
- 1992 – Deniss Rakels, Latvian footballer
- 1992 – Callum Skinner, Scottish track cyclist
- 1993 – Tonisha Rock-Yaw, Barbadian netball player
- 1994 – Mitchell Trubisky, American football player
- 1995 – Liana Liberato, American actress
- 1996 – Bunty Afoa, New Zealand rugby league player
- 1997 – Kaho Minagawa, Japanese rhythmic gymnast
- 1997 – Daniel Vladař, Czech ice hockey player
- 1998 – Lieke Klaver, Dutch track and field athlete
- 2003 – Prince Gabriel of Belgium

== Deaths ==
=== Pre-1600 ===
- AD 2 – Lucius Caesar, Roman son of Marcus Vipsanius Agrippa (born 12 BC)
- AD 14 – Agrippa Postumus, Roman son of Marcus Vipsanius Agrippa (born 12 BC)
- 535 – Mochta, Irish missionary and saint
- 651 – Oswine of Deira
- 768 – Eadberht of Northumbria
- 917 – Constantine Lips, Byzantine admiral
- 984 – Pope John XIV
- 1153 – Bernard of Clairvaux, French theologian and saint (born 1090)
- 1158 – Rögnvald Kali Kolsson (born 1100), Earl of Orkney and Saint
- 1297 – William Fraser, bishop and Guardian of Scotland
- 1348 – Laurence Hastings, 1st Earl of Pembroke (born 1319)
- 1384 – Geert Groote, Dutch preacher, founded the Brethren of the Common Life (born 1340)
- 1386 – Bo Jonsson, royal marshal of Sweden
- 1471 – Borso d'Este, Duke of Ferrara (born 1413)
- 1528 – Georg von Frundsberg, German knight and landowner (born 1473)
- 1572 – Miguel López de Legazpi, Spanish navigator and politician, 1st Governor-General of the Philippines (born 1502)
- 1580 – Jerónimo Osório, Portuguese historian and author (born 1506)

=== 1601–1900 ===
- 1611 – Tomás Luis de Victoria, Spanish priest and composer (born 1548)
- 1639 – Martin Opitz, German poet and hymnwriter (born 1597)
- 1648 – Edward Herbert, 1st Baron Herbert of Cherbury, English soldier and diplomat (born 1583)
- 1651 – Jeremi Wiśniowiecki, Polish nobleman (born 1612)
- 1672 – Cornelis de Witt, Dutch lawyer and politician (born 1623)
- 1672 – Johan de Witt, Dutch mathematician and politician (born 1625)
- 1680 – William Bedloe, English spy (born 1650)
- 1701 – Sir Charles Sedley, 5th Baronet, English playwright and politician (born 1639)
- 1707 – Nicolas Gigault, French organist and composer (born 1627)
- 1773 – Enrique Flórez, Spanish historian and author (born 1701)
- 1785 – Jean-Baptiste Pigalle, French sculptor (born 1714)
- 1823 – Pope Pius VII (born 1740)
- 1825 – William Waldegrave, 1st Baron Radstock, English admiral and politician, Governor of Newfoundland (born 1753)
- 1835 – Agnes Bulmer, English merchant and poet (born 1775)
- 1854 – Shiranui Dakuemon, Japanese sumo wrestler, the 8th Yokozuna (born 1801)
- 1859 – Juan Bautista Ceballos, former president of Mexico (born 1811)
- 1882 – James Whyte, Scottish-Australian politician, 6th Premier of Tasmania (born 1820)
- 1887 – Jules Laforgue, French poet and author (born 1860)
- 1893 – Alexander Wassilko von Serecki, Austrian lawyer and politician (born 1827)
- 1897 – Charles Lilley, English-Australian politician, 4th Premier of Queensland (born 1827)

=== 1901–present ===
- 1912 – William Booth, English preacher, co-founded The Salvation Army (born 1829)
- 1914 – Pope Pius X (born 1835)
- 1915 – Paul Ehrlich, German physician and academic, Nobel Prize laureate (born 1854)
- 1917 – Adolf von Baeyer, German chemist and academic, Nobel Prize laureate (born 1835)
- 1919 – Greg MacGregor, Scottish cricketer and rugby player (born 1869)
- 1930 – Charles Bannerman, Australian cricketer and umpire (born 1851)
- 1936 – Edward Weston, English-American chemist (born 1850)
- 1939 – Agnes Giberne, Indian-English astronomer and author (born 1845)
- 1942 – István Horthy, Hungarian admiral and pilot (born 1904)
- 1943 – William Irvine, Irish-Australian politician, 21st Premier of Victoria (born 1858)
- 1949 – Ragnhild Kaarbø, Norwegian painter (born 1889)
- 1951 – İzzettin Çalışlar, Turkish general (born 1882)
- 1961 – Percy Williams Bridgman, American physicist and academic, Nobel Prize laureate (born 1882)
- 1963 – Joan Voûte, Dutch astronomer (born 1879)
- 1965 – Jonathan Daniels, American seminarian and civil rights activist (born 1939)
- 1971 – Rashid Minhas, Pakistani lieutenant and pilot (born 1951)
- 1976 – Vera Lutz, British economist (born 1912)
- 1979 – Christian Dotremont, Belgian painter and poet (born 1922)
- 1980 – Joe Dassin, American-French singer-songwriter (born 1938)
- 1981 – Michael Devine, Irish Republican, died on hunger strike (born 1954)
- 1982 – Ulla Jacobsson, Swedish actress (born 1929)
- 1985 – Donald O. Hebb, Canadian psychologist and academic (born 1904)
- 1985 – Wilhelm Meendsen-Bohlken, German admiral (born 1897)
- 1986 – Milton Acorn, Canadian poet and playwright (born 1923)
- 1987 – Walenty Kłyszejko, Estonian–Polish basketball player and coach (born 1909)
- 1993 – Bernard Delfgaauw, Dutch philosopher and academic (born 1912)
- 1995 – Hugo Pratt, Italian author and illustrator (born 1927)
- 1996 – Rio Reiser, German singer-songwriter (born 1950)
- 1997 – Norris Bradbury, American soldier, physicist, and academic (born 1909)
- 1997 – Léon Dion, Canadian political scientist and academic (born 1922)
- 1998 – Vũ Văn Mẫu, 10th and final Prime Minister of South Vietnam (born 1914)
- 2001 – Fred Hoyle, English astronomer and author (born 1915)
- 2001 – Kim Stanley, American actress (born 1925)
- 2005 – Thomas Herrion, American football player (born 1981)
- 2005 – Krzysztof Raczkowski, Polish drummer and songwriter (born 1970)
- 2006 – Bryan Budd, Northern Ireland-born English soldier, Victoria Cross recipient (born 1977)
- 2006 – Joe Rosenthal, American photographer and journalist (born 1911)
- 2006 – S. Sivamaharajah, Sri Lankan Tamil newspaper publisher and politician (born 1938)
- 2007 – Leona Helmsley, American businesswoman (born 1920)
- 2008 – Ed Freeman, American soldier and pilot, Medal of Honor recipient (born 1927)
- 2008 – Hua Guofeng, Chinese politician, 2nd Premier of the People's Republic of China (born 1921)
- 2008 – Stephanie Tubbs Jones, American lawyer and politician (born 1949)
- 2008 – Gene Upshaw, American football player (born 1945)
- 2009 – Larry Knechtel, American keyboardist and bass player (born 1940)
- 2009 – Karla Kuskin, American author and illustrator (born 1932)
- 2010 – Đặng Phong, Vietnamese economist and historian (born 1937)
- 2011 – Ram Sharan Sharma, Indian historian and academic (born 1919)
- 2012 – Phyllis Diller, American actress and comedian (born 1917)
- 2012 – Daryl Hine, Canadian-American poet and academic (born 1936)
- 2012 – Dom Mintoff, Maltese journalist and politician, 8th Prime Minister of Malta (born 1916)
- 2012 – Mika Yamamoto, Japanese journalist (born 1967)
- 2012 – Meles Zenawi, Ethiopian soldier and politician, Prime Minister of Ethiopia (born 1955)
- 2013 – Sathima Bea Benjamin, South African singer-songwriter (born 1936)
- 2013 – Narendra Dabholkar, Indian author and activist (born 1945)
- 2013 – Elmore Leonard, American novelist, short story writer, and screenwriter (born 1925)
- 2013 – Marian McPartland, English-American pianist and composer (born 1918)
- 2013 – Ted Post, American director and screenwriter (born 1918)
- 2014 – Anton Buslov, Russian astrophysicist and journalist (born 1983)
- 2014 – Lois Mai Chan, Taiwanese-American librarian, author, and academic (born 1934)
- 2014 – Boris Dubin, Russian sociologist and academic (born 1946)
- 2014 – B. K. S. Iyengar, Indian yoga instructor and author, founded Iyengar Yoga (born 1918)
- 2014 – Buddy MacMaster, Canadian singer-songwriter and fiddler (born 1924)
- 2014 – Sava Stojkov, Serbian painter and educator (born 1925)
- 2014 – Edmund Szoka, American cardinal (born 1927)
- 2015 – Egon Bahr, German journalist and politician, Federal Minister for Special Affairs of Germany (born 1922)
- 2015 – Paul Kibblewhite, New Zealand chemist and engineer (born 1941)
- 2017 – Jerry Lewis, American actor and comedian (born 1926)
- 2018 – Uri Avnery, Israeli writer, politician and peace activist (born 1923)
- 2018 – Jennifer Ramírez Rivero, Venezuelan model (born 1978)
- 2020 - Chi Chi DeVayne, American Drag Queen (born 1985)
- 2021 – Igor Vovkovinskiy, Ukrainian-American law student and actor, American tallest person (born 1982)
- 2022 – Darya Dugina, Russian journalist (born 1992)
- 2024 – Al Attles, American basketball player and coach (born 1936)

== Holidays and observances ==
- Christian feast day:
  - Amadour
  - Bernard of Clairvaux
  - Blessed Georg Häfner
  - Heliodorus of Bet Zabdai
  - Maria De Mattias
  - Oswine of Deira
  - Philibert of Jumièges
  - Samuel (prophet)
  - William and Catherine Booth (Church of England)
  - August 20 (Eastern Orthodox liturgics)
- Feast of Asmá’ (Baháʼí Faith, only if Baháʼí Naw-Rúz falls on March 21)
- Indian Akshay Urja Day (India)
- Independence Restoration Day (Estonia), re-declaration of the independence of Estonia from the Soviet Union in 1991.
- Meitei Language Day, also known as Manipuri Language Day, the day on which Meitei (Manipuri) was included in the scheduled languages' list and made one of the official languages of India.
- Revolution of the King and the People (Morocco)
- Saint Stephen's Day (Hungary)
- World Mosquito Day
