= Consulate General of Russia, New York City =

Consulate General of the Russian Federation in New York City Генеральное консульство Российской Федерации в Нью-Йорке
- Location: New York
- Address: 9 East 91st Street; New York, NY 10128
- Coordinates: 40.78452°N 73.95703°W
- Opened: October 26, 1994
- Consul General: Alexander Konstantinovich Zakharov (from September 12, 2023)
- Website: newyork.mid.ru

The Consulate General of Russia in New York City is the diplomatic mission of the Russian Federation in New York City. Opened in 1994, the consulate is located at 9 East 91st Street in the former John Henry Hammond House on the Upper East Side of Manhattan. A consulate of the former Soviet Union had previously existed on East 61st Street from 1933 until 1948.

== The house ==
The house was built in 1903 by John H. Hammond, a New York City banker. The five-story Renaissance style limestone townhouse was designed by Carrère and Hastings, who were also responsible for the design of the New York Public Library Main Branch, and is regarded as one of their finest residences. The ground floor has pronounced banded rustication, while the other floors contain progressively smaller windows.

== History ==
=== Russian Empire ===
Many Russian emigrants that came to the United States between 1903 and 1926 came through New York, making the New York consulate an important part of the Russian Empire's diplomatic mission. Until 1915, the consulate had jurisdiction over the Philadelphia consulate after which responsibility was assumed by the consul general in Pittsburgh. At one point the consulate was located in the Flatiron Building.

=== Soviet Union ===
On November 16, 1933, the Roosevelt-Litvinov Agreement was signed where the United States recognized the Soviet Union and diplomatic relations between the two countries began. Five months later, on April 21, 1934, the Soviets opened a consulate general in New York City at 7–9 East 61st Street.

On July 31, 1948, Oksana Kasenkina, a Soviet citizen and a teacher to the children of diplomats of the Soviet mission to the United Nations, appealed to the editor of a Russian-language newspaper in New York City for refuge, and arrangements were made to take Kasenkina to Reed Farm in Valley Cottage, which was operated by the White Russian Tolstoy Foundation. Whilst at the Farm, Kasenkina wrote a letter to Soviet Consul-General Jacob Lomakin ending: "I implore you, I implore you once more, don't let me perish here. I am without willpower." On August 7 Lomakin with vice-consul Chepurnykh arrived at the farm. According to Tolstoy Foundation President Mrs. Alexandra Tolstaya, Kasenkina "at her own free will" went with them to the consulate. On August 9, Soviet Ambassador to the United States Alexander Panyushkin presented a letter of protest to the United States Department of State, alleging that Kasenkina had been kidnapped and held against her will by members of the Tolstoy Foundation. On August 11, Vyacheslav Molotov handed a protest note to United States Ambassador to the Soviet Union Walter Bedell Smith, in which the accusations were repeated.

Following the atmosphere in which the New York City press accused the Soviets of holding Kasenkina against her will, on August 11 New York Supreme Court Justice Samuel Dickstein issued a writ of habeas corpus on Consul-General Lomakin, demanding that he present Kasenkina the following day in court. The same day a Soviet consular official stated that Lomakin would not be presenting Kasenkina, and the following morning Ambassador Panyushkin presented the State Department with a note disputing the legality of the writ under international law. A State Department legal adviser wrote to Governor of New York Thomas E. Dewey, outlining the Soviet complaints and urged Justice Dickstein to take the case under advisement. Shortly afterward Justice Dickstein reserved decision in the proceedings.

On the day of Dickstein's decision, August 12, the affair took a different turn when Kasenkina jumped from the third-story window of the East 61st Street consulate. Rescued by two police officers, she was brought to a hospital to be treated for injuries sustained in the fall. "Asked by a police detective why she had jumped, some six hours after the event, Kasenkina's reply indicated a stronger desire for deliverance than for asylum. Naturally, Kasenkina's memoir presented her as a heroic freedom seeker."

On August 19, 1948, the US State Department requested that Jacob Lomakin be recalled by the Soviets due to his connection with the Kasenkina case. The Soviets responded by closing their New York and San Francisco consulates on August 25, 1948, and on the basis of reciprocity, the Soviets ordered the US consulate in Vladivostok closed and plans for the Leningrad consulate were shelved. Whilst travelling to Gothenburg on the MS Stockholm, Lomakin stated that he would be advising Moscow against the re-establishment of consular relations with the United States.

In 1974 the United States and Soviet Union came to an agreement to open consulates in cities in their respective countries; the United States in Kiev and the Soviet Union in New York City. The agreement between the two countries meant that no country could open its consulate before the other. The Soviets completed all renovations to their building within a year of purchase; however, the Americans had not completed the building of their consulate in Kiev. In 1978, whilst waiting for the Americans, the Soviets bought the adjacent building at 11 East 91st Street to utilize for housing.

After the Soviet intervention in Afghanistan, in January 1980 U.S. President Jimmy Carter put an immediate freeze on the consulate program, by withdrawing seven consular officers from Kiev who had been sent to the Ukrainian SSR in advance of the consulate opening, and ordering the expulsion of 17 Soviet diplomats who were to be attached to the Soviet consulate in New York City.

=== Russian Federation ===
The Consulate General of the Russian Federation in New York City opened to the public on October 26, 1994, and was officially opened on January 31, 1995. The consulate covers the consular region of Connecticut, Maine, Massachusetts, New Hampshire, New Jersey, New York, Pennsylvania, Rhode Island and Vermont.

== Headquarters ==
Initially, the Russian consulate in New York was located at Bleecker Street 92 (1829), then at Broome St. 426 (1832-1834), Beekman St. 27 (1835), Broome St. 505 (1836-1840), Broad St. 56 (1842), Fourth St. 407 (1844-1846), Tenth St. 107 (1847-1853), Fourth Ave. 260 (1854-1857), Broadway 7 (1859-1862), Exchange Pl. 50 (1864-1865), Exchange Pl. 52 (1872-1878), Broadway 31 (1881-1883), State St. 24 (1898), Broadway 68 (1904), Washington Sq. 22 (1910-1915).

The USSR consulate was located in the John T. Pratt Mansion on East 61st St. 7-9 (1933–1948), currently not preserved, and contemporary Russia in a Renaissance-style building (designed by Carrère and Hastings) by John Henry Hammond, a New York banker from 1903 at East 91st St. 9 (1994-)

== Consuls General of Russia in New York ==
Name	Position	Official residence	Appointment	Entered duty	Termination	Sources
John Griffith Bogert	vice-consul	New York	unknown	1810-03-07 (Note: Exequatur on 1811-06-11)	unknown	
Aleksei Evstafiev	consul	New York	1828		1857	
Ivan Karlovich Notbek	consul		1857		1861	
Robert Romanovich Osten-Saken	consul		1862		1871	
Vladimir Alexandrovich Bodisko	consul		1871		1878	
Pyotr Vikentievich Karchevsky	consul		1879		1880	
Vladimir Alekseevich Veletsky	consul		1880		1884	
Roman Romanovich Rosen	consul		1884		1890	
Alexander Epiktetovich Olarovsky	consul		1891		1897	
Vladimir Alexandrovich Teplov	consul		1897		1902	
Nikolay Nikolaevich Lodyzhensky	consul		1902		1908	
Albert Albertovich Schlippenbach	consul		1908		1913	
Mikhail Mikhailovich Ustinov	consul		1913		1925	
Leonid Mikhailovich Tolokonsky	consul		1934		1935	
Ivan (Jean) Lvovich Arens	consul		1935		1937	
Pavel Yulievich Borovoy	consul		1937		1938	
Ivan Petrovich Solodov	consul		1938		1940	
Victor Alekseevich Fedyushin	consul		1940		1942	
Evgeniy Dmitrievich Kiselev	consul		1943		1945	
Pavel Petrovich Melkishev (Mikhailov)	consul		1945		1946	
Yakov Mironovich Lomakin	consul		1946		1948	
Ivan Andreevich Kuznetsov	consul		1990		1996	
Nikolai Ivanovich Sadchikov	consul		1997		1999	
Pavel Alekseevich Prokofiev	consul		1999		2001	
Vyacheslav Alfredovich Pavlovsky	consul		2001		2004	
Sergey Viktorovich Garmonin	consul		2004		2009	
Andrey Konstantinovich Yushmanov	consul		2010		2012	
Igor Leonidovich Golubovsky	consul		2012		2017	
Sergey Konstantinovich Ovsyannikov	consul		2017		2023	
Alexander Konstantinovich Zakharov	consul		2023		Present	

== Gallery ==
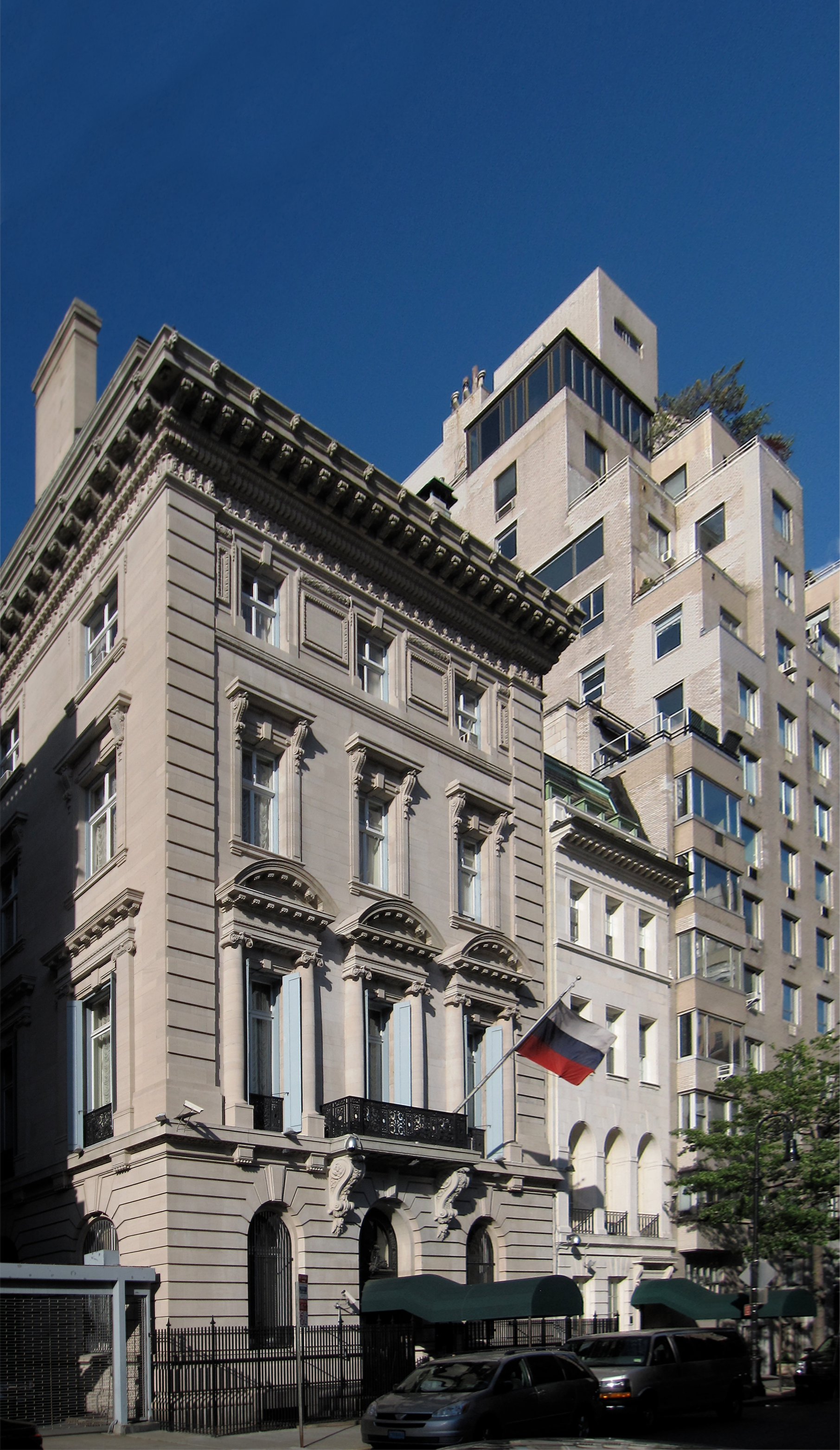

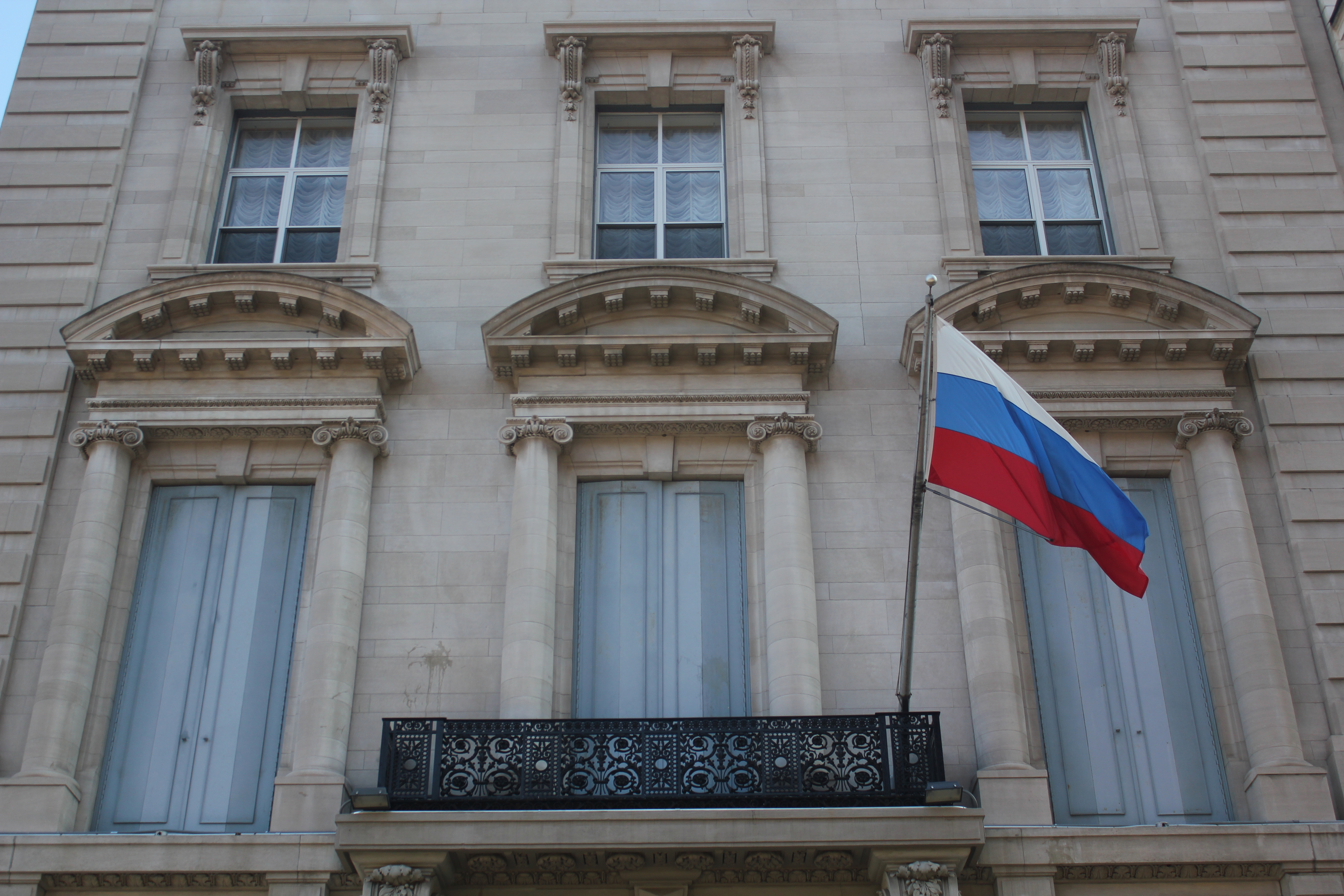

== See also ==
- List of diplomatic missions of Russia
- List of ambassadors of Russia to the United States
- Permanent Mission of Russia to the United Nations
- Russian Mission School in New York
- Russian Americans in New York City
- John Henry Hammond House
- Amtorg

== Bibliography ==
- Bashkina, Nina N.; et al. (1980a). The United States and Russia: The Beginning of Relations, 1765–1815. Washington: United States Government Printing Office. LCCN 80-607939.
- Bashkina, Nina N.; et al. (1980b). "Russian Diplomatic and Consular Appointments to the United States, 1780–1815". The United States and Russia: The Beginning of Relations, 1765–1815. Washington: United States Government Printing Office. pp. 1111–1112. LCCN 80-607939.
