= Consulate General of Russia, San Francisco =

Former diplomatic mission of Russia in USA

Former Consulate General of the Russian Federation in San Francisco
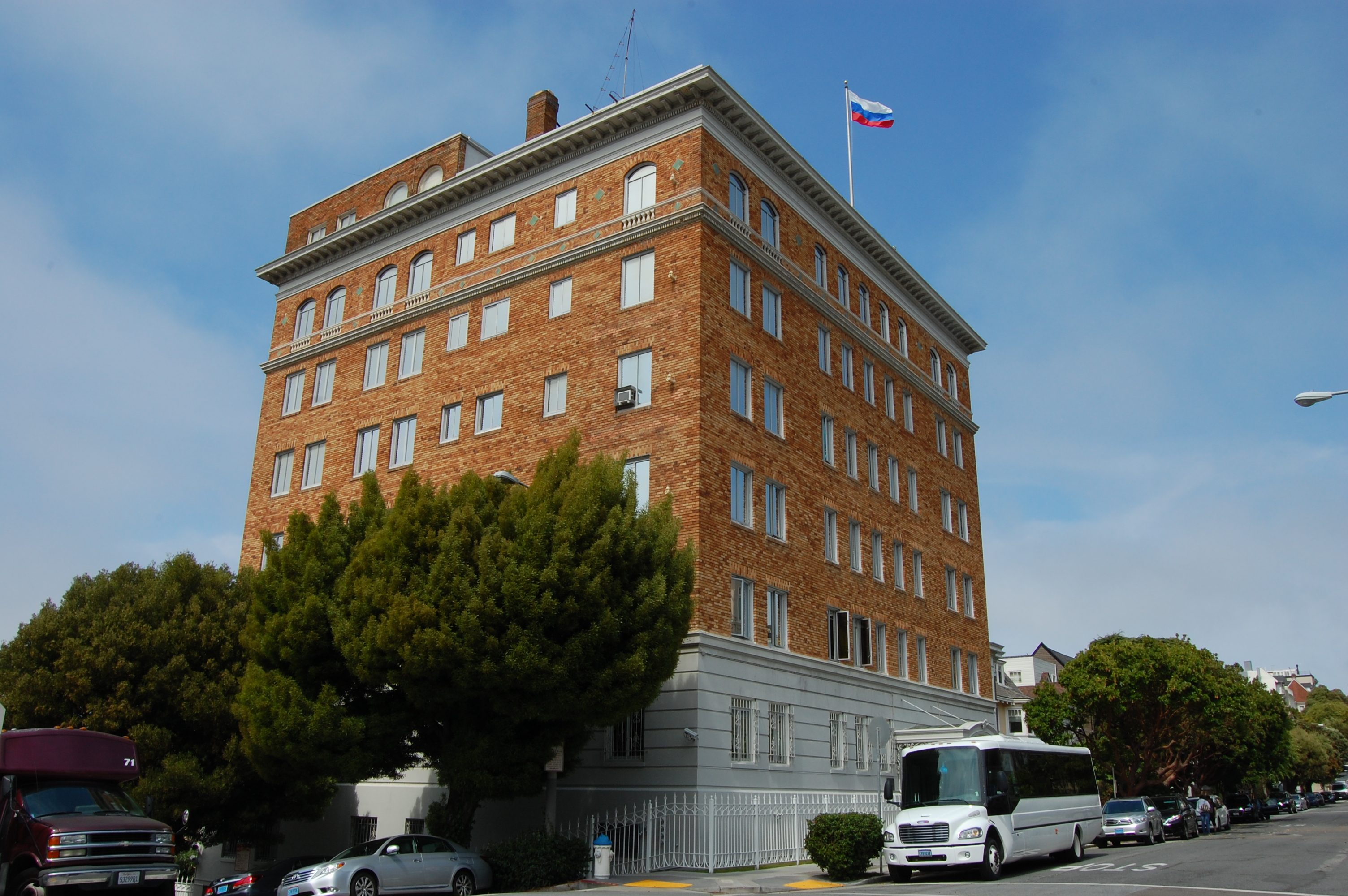
- Location: San Francisco
- Address: 2790 Green Street; San Francisco, CA 94123
- Coordinates: 37.7951°N 122.4450°W
- Opened: June 23, 1973
- Closed: 2017
- Consul General: Sergey Vladimirovich Petrov (prior to closing in 2017)
- Website: sanfrancisco.mid.ru

The Consulate General of Russia in San Francisco was Russia's diplomatic office in the 2790 Green Street building in Pacific Heights, San Francisco, California. It was operated by the Russian Ministry of Foreign Affairs. The building of the former consulate remains government property of Russia.

During the Russian Empire the consulate had jurisdiction over the Honolulu, Portland, and Seattle consulates. During the Soviet Union, the consulate and the New York consulate were the only active Soviet consulates in the United States.

== History ==
=== Russian Empire ===
On February 14, 1852, due to increased activity of the Russian-American Company in California, the government of the Russian Empire appointed entrepreneur William Montgomery Stuart as its first consul in San Francisco. The consulate was responsible for Russian subjects and affairs in Arizona, California, Colorado, Idaho, Montana, Nevada, New Mexico, Oregon, Utah, Washington, Wyoming, Hawaii and Alaska.

On October 3, 1853, Andrey Eduardovich Stekl became the consul followed by Peter Kostromitinov from December 28, 1853, until 1862. Kostromitinov was an agent of the Russian-American Company and a manager at Fort Ross.

From 1862 to 1875, Martin Fedorovich Klinkovstrom was the consul followed by Gustav Newbaum - who was an entrepreneur from the Alaska Commercial Company. While Newbaum was consul, the consulate was located initially at 411 California Street and then later at 418 California Street.

From April 6, 1915, until the February Revolution, Artemy Markovich Vydotsev was the last consul of the Russian Empire. In November 1924 due to lack of funding the consulate on California Street was closed, which led to the usage of William Westerfeld House as the consulate. From 1926 until 1933 Vydotsev and Arthur-Karl Landesen, who had been vice-consul at the Russian Consulate General in Harbin from 1914 to 1921, served as consuls on a voluntary basis.

=== Soviet Union ===
On November 16, 1933, the Roosevelt-Litvinov Agreement was signed in which both sides said they were prepared to negotiate a consular convention. This led to the first consulate of the Soviet Union in San Francisco being opened on 2563 Divisadero Street in April 1934, with Moses Grigorievich Galkovich as consul from 1934 to 1937.

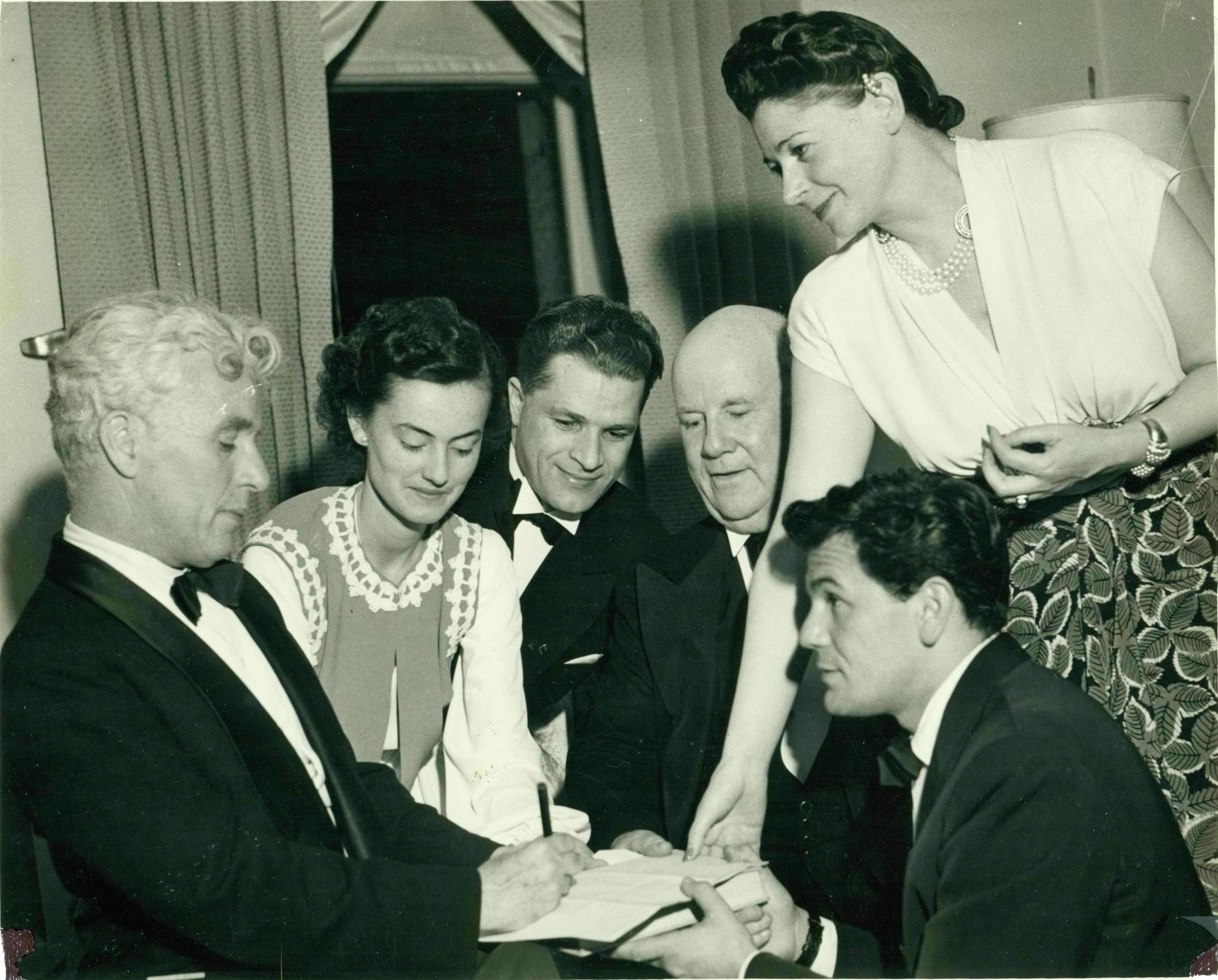
Charlie Chaplin (far left) at a Russian War Relief event on May 18, 1942, signing an appeal to US President Franklin D. Roosevelt requesting the opening of the Second Front. Soviet Consul Jacob Lamokin is third from left, and actor John Garfield is on the far right.

During World War II, Jacob M. Lomakin was the consul from February 1942 until 1944. He was active in the Lend-Lease program, and at events for raising funds to aid the Red Army. Some of the funding came from coalition anti-fascist organizations, such as the nonpartisan Red Cross Society, the American Russian Institute, and the Russian War Relief. Together with progressive cultural figures, and military and governmental officials of the United States, Lomakin advocated the opening of the Second Front in order to relieve military pressure on the Soviet Union.

On August 19, 1948, the US State Department requested that Jacob Lomakin - who was now consulate general in New York - be recalled by the Soviets due to his connection with the Kasenkina case. The Soviets responded by closing their New York and San Francisco consulates on August 25, 1948, and on the basis of reciprocity, the Soviets ordered the US consulate in Vladivostok closed and plans for the Leningrad consulate were shelved.

On June 1, 1964, in Moscow the Soviet Union and United States signed a consular convention, allowing for both countries to open consulates outside their national capitals. The Soviets were believed to be considering New York, San Francisco, and Chicago, while the United States was considering Leningrad and Odessa. The consular convention was ratified on June 13, 1968, by Lyndon B. Johnson, and came into force on July 13, 1968.

In 1971 Alexander Ivanovich Zinchuk became the de facto consul for USSR. Consular relations between the USSR and the US were restored only after 24 years in 1972 during the extensive dialogue between the Soviet Union and United States that year. On June 23, 1973, the consulate moved into its current location, a six-story former apartment building at 2790 Green Street. Zinchuk became the official consul for the USSR in San Francisco.

=== Russian Federation ===
In 2011 the consulate bought new granite headstones, for a total of $20,000, for Russian sailors who died fighting the San Francisco Fire of 1863. The graves were installed on Mare Island in Vallejo, California. The city government protested the plan, saying that it goes against historical preservation.

In December 2016, four Russian diplomats posted to the consulate, including a chef were declared persona non grata due to alleged espionage, in retaliation for Russian interference in the United States presidential election.

On August 31, 2017, the State Department ordered the consulate closed by September 2, 2017. Before the consulate was closed, smoke was seen billowing out of the building, suggesting sensitive materials were being destroyed.

As of early 2025 the US and Russian governments are in talks with a view to reopening the consulate.

== Espionage ==
In 1987, Ivan N. Miroshkin of the Soviet Ministry of Foreign Affairs, reported that the consulate had been bugged by the United States using a secret tunnel the United States had bored under the consulate.

In 1984, a United States government report indicated that there may have been approximately 50 Soviet spies operating out of the consulate, primarily targeting Silicon Valley. Russian diplomats based out of the consulate have also been reportedly mapping where underground nodes connected the national fiber-optic communication network, and it was alleged that the network of antennas and other electronic communication equipment on the roof of the consulate were being used to transmit information to submarines or trawlers located off the Pacific coast in international waters.

== Consuls General of Russia in San Francisco ==
Name	Date
William Montgomery Stuart	1852 February 14 — 1853
Andrey Eduardovich Stekl	1853 October 3 — 1853 December
Peter Kostromitinov	1853 December 28 — 1862
Martin Fedorovich Klinkovstrom	1862 — 1875
Gustav Newbaum	1875
Vladimir R. Artsimovitch	1899 — 1902
Paul Kosakevitch	1902 — 1909
Pierre Rogestvensky	1909 — 1915
Artemy Markovich Vydotsev	1915 April 6 — February Revolution; 1926 — 1933 (voluntary basis)
Arthur-Karl Yulievich von Landesen	1926 — 1933 (voluntary basis)
Moses Grigorievich Galkovich	1934 — 1937
Jacob M. Lomakin	1942 February — 1944
Alexander Ivanovich Zinchuk	1971 (de facto), 1973 (official)
Sergey Vladimirovich Petrov	2013 March 5 — Prior to closing in 2017

== Gallery ==
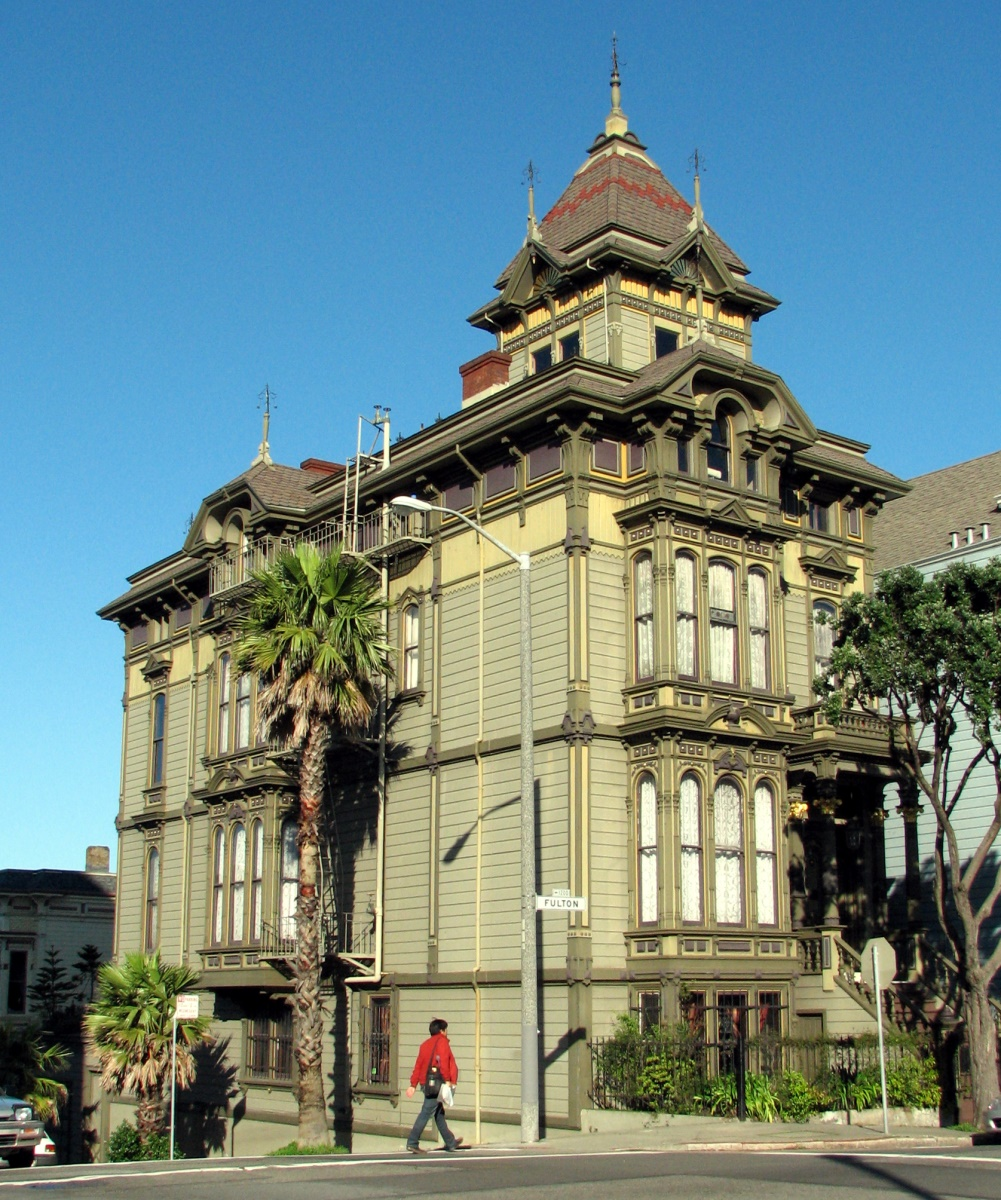
William Westerfeld House was the consulate's location when Vydotsev was the voluntary consul.

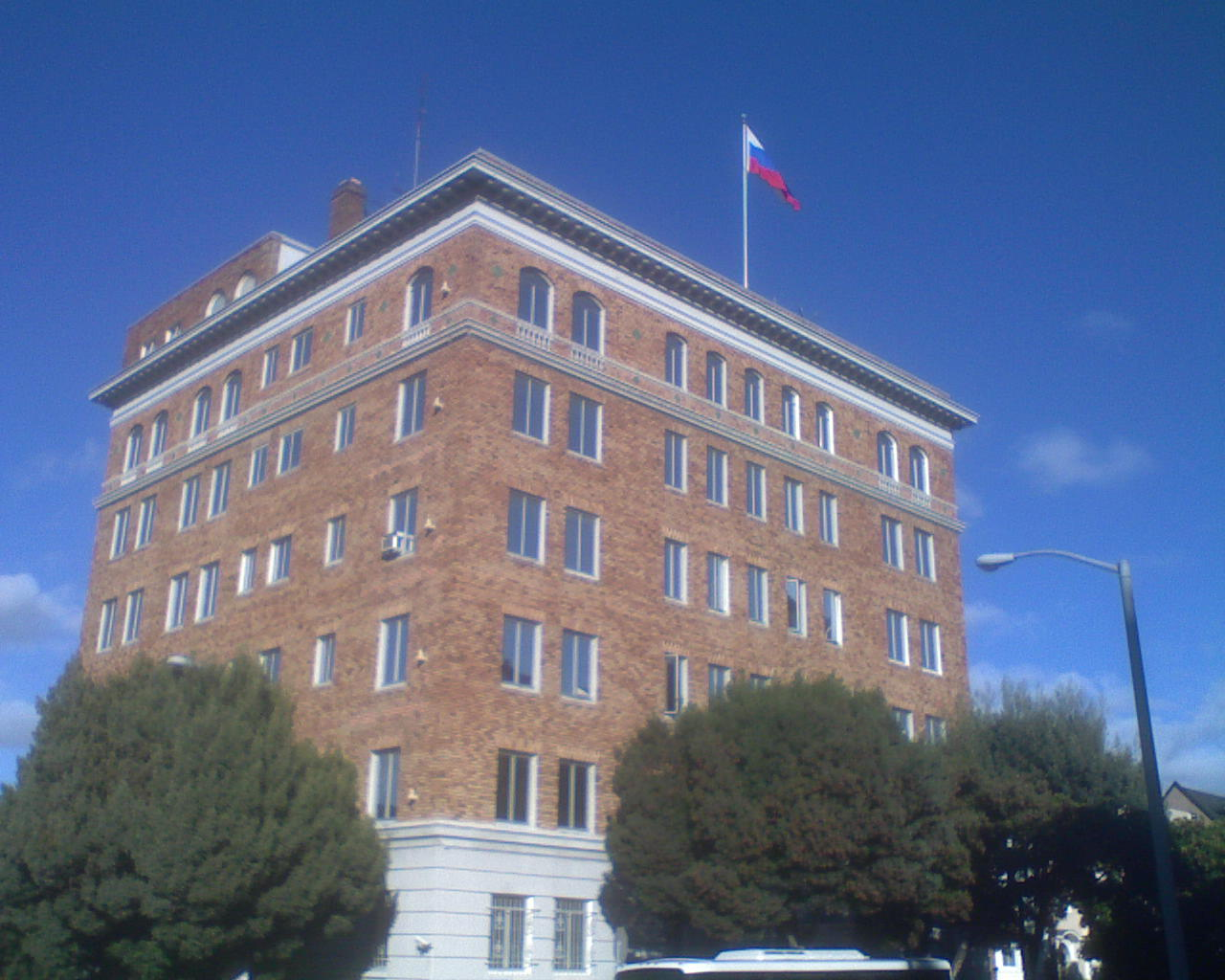
Current location of the consulate on Green Street.

== See also ==
- List of diplomatic missions of Russia
- List of ambassadors of Russia to the United States

== Bibliography ==
- Bogdan, Nina (2021). Between Dreams and Reality: The Russian Diaspora in San Francisco, 1917-1957 (PDF) (Thesis). University of Arizona.
