= Behind Closed Doors (1958 TV series) =

- Genre: Espionage drama
- Starring: Bruce Gordon
- Country of origin: United States
- Original language: English
- No. of seasons: 1
- No. of episodes: 26

Production
- Executive producer: Sam Gallu
- Producer: Sidney Marshall
- Running time: ca. 25 mins.
- Production companies: Jane Gallu Productions; Screen Gems

Original release
- Network: NBC
- Release: October 2, 1958 – April 9, 1959

Promotional poster depicting Bruce Gordon as Commander Matson

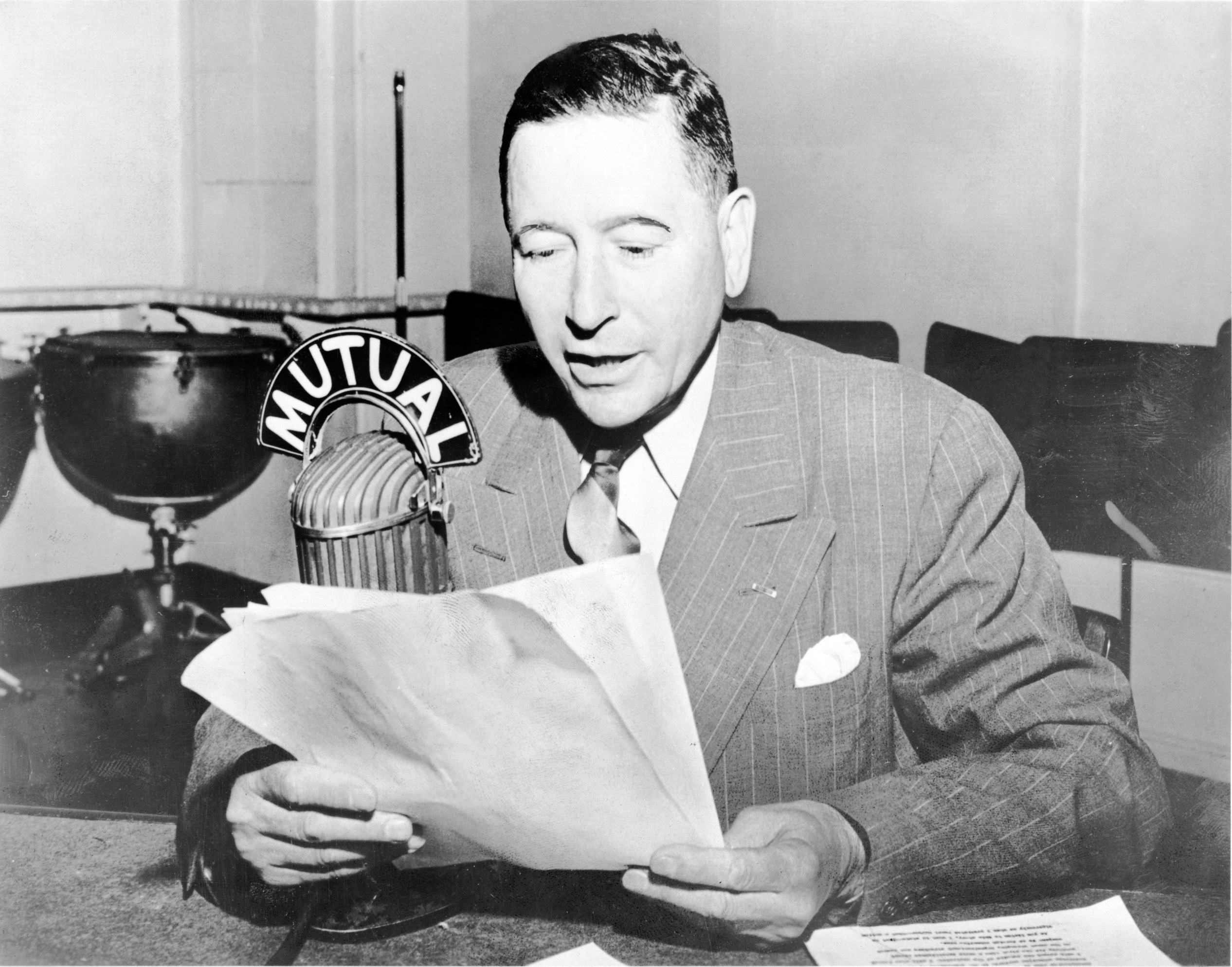
Retired Rear Admiral Ellis M. Zacharias hosting Secret Missions (1948–1949), a radio drama based on his book of the same name

Behind Closed Doors is an American spy drama television series. It stars Bruce Gordon and aired on NBC during the 1958–59 television season.

== Synopsis ==
An anthology series, Behind Closed Doors each week depicted international intrigue and Western counterespionage incidents during the Cold War. United States Navy Commander Matson both hosts the series and appears as a character in some of its episodes. Rear Admiral Ellis M. Zacharias provides comments at the end of each episode.

== Cast ==
- Bruce Gordon...Commander Matson
- Rear Admiral (ret.) Ellis M. Zacharias...Himself

== Production ==
Harry Ackerman, then vice-president of Screen Gems, created Behind Closed Doors.

The episodes of Behind Closed Doors are based on the files of Rear Admiral Ellis M. Zacharias, who served in the United States Navy from 1912 to 1946 and spent a 25-year career in naval intelligence, culminating in a tour as the Deputy Director of Naval Intelligence. The title of the series was the same as that of a book he had written, and he served as the technical consultant for the series. His files covered real-life events of the era before the Cold War, so although inspired by real-life pre-Cold War events, the storylines of Behind Closed Doors were updated, relocated, and fictionalized to depict the Cold War period. Zacharias's comments at the end of each episode highlighted the themes and lessons of the episode.

Behind Closed Doors was a Screen Gems production. Sam Gallu was its executive producer, and Sidney Marshall produced the series.

Whitehall Pharmaceuticals and Liggett & Myers Tobacco Company were the sponsors. The show's main competition was Dick Powell's Zane Grey Theatre and Pat Boone's The Pat Boone Chevy Showroom.

== Broadcast history ==
Behind Closed Doors premiered on October 2, 1958, and 26 episodes were produced. It aired on NBC on Thursdays at 9:00 p.m. Eastern Time. The show was cancelled after a single season, and its last episode was broadcast on April 9, 1959.

== Episodes ==
No.	Title	Directed by	Written by	Original release date
1	"The Cape Canaveral Story"	Paul Wendkos	Paul Monash	October 2, 1958
While U.S. naval intelligence tries to prevent a Soviet submarine from monitoring U.S. missile experiments, a man calling himself Mr. Meyers charters Florida fisherman Wayne Hollister's boat for a day and demands that Hollister take him to the waters off Cape Canaveral, not because Meyers wants to fish there, but because he wants to observe the launching of a rocket. Guest stars: Joe Maross, Jacques Aubuchon, Peter Whitney, Bill Henry, Virginia Christine, Kathleen O'Malley, Marc Snow, and Gabriel Curtiz.
2	"Flight to Freedom"	Unknown	Unknown	October 9, 1958
Horrified when the Soviets conduct a brain operation on his associate that leaves him in a persistent vegetative state, a German rocket scientist forced to work in the Soviet Union's guided missile program attempts a daring escape. Guest stars: Francis Lederer, John Wengraf, Arline Sax, Jack Kruschen, Mark Dunhill, Gene Roth, and Steve Mitchell.
3	"Double Jeopardy"	Gerd Oswald	Leonard Lee	October 16, 1958
After British and U.S. intelligence personnel learn that the Soviet ambassador to the United Nations will discuss Soviet nuclear weapons plans during a visit to the Soviet embassy in London, the British secret service asks a staid, mild-mannered British Russian language professor from the University of Oxford to pose as a janitor at the embassy and plant a listening device so that they can collect the information. Guest stars: Reginald Gardiner, Lester Matthews, Tom McKee, Joseph Marievsky, Sam Savitsky, Alexander Akimoff, and Alexander Ramati.
4	"M.I.G. 9"	Unknown	Unknown	October 23, 1958
A Soviet Air Force lieutenant who wants to defect to the West arranges to fly out in the latest Soviet MiG aircraft — but Soviet agents move to stop him. Guest stars: Kenneth Tobey, Jim Bannon, Linda Leighton, Peter Coe, Melinda Byron, Douglas Evans, and John McNamara.
5	"Trouble in Test Cell #19"	John Peyser	Richard Tregaskis and Jacqueline Hazard	October 30, 1958
Alternative title "Trouble in Test Cell #10." U.S. intelligence personnel seek the person who sabotaged a new jet engine, causing it to blow up during its final test before it enters mass production. Guest stars: Jacques Aubuchon, James Todd, Sam Buffington, and Bek Nelson.
6	"Man in the Moon"	John Peyser	Irving Wallace	November 6, 1958
Clara Koller, a lonely widow who manages the budget for a manufacturing company involved in a secret United States Government project, accepts an invitation to join a friendship club, not realizing that it is a front for enemy agents planning to prey upon her. Guest stars: Judith Evelyn, Denver Pyle, Stewart Bradley, Ruth Terry, John Damler, Ruth Lee, and Maurice Wells.
7	"The Nike Story"	John Peyser	John Hawkins	November 13, 1958
Plans call for the conversion of a military base near Whitfield, Illinois, into a Nike Hercules nuclear surface-to-air missile site. Some of the citizens of Whitfield oppose the basing of nuclear missiles there, and enemy agents infiltrate the concerned citizens group. When a U.S. military officer is murdered on the base while trying to trap one of the agents, Captain (or Major, according to some sources) John Benson arrives to investigate — and plans to use an open house at the base to capture the entire ring of enemy agents. Guest stars: John Doucette, Ralph Clanton, William Bryant, Angela Greene, and William Quinn.
8	"It Was Learned on High Authority"	John Peyser	Stanley Niss and Herbert Abbott Spiro	November 27, 1958
A group of scientists is scheduled to fly to Cape Canaveral, Florida, and Fred Lang, an enemy agent who works as an engineer on a missile base in Los Angeles, California, receives orders to place a bomb on the scientists' plane. Guest stars: Robert Knapp, Alex Gerry, Jeanne Baird, Dick Rich, Richard S. Davies, and Walter Maslow.
9	"The Enemy on the Flank"	John Peyser	Alan Caillou	December 4, 1958
After U.S. intelligence personnel discover that the Soviet Union has made plans for a Soviet Navy submarine to operate from a base in Albania and interfere with the United States Sixth Fleet as it moves to intervene in the 1958 Lebanon crisis, two U.S. agents gather details of the Soviet plans, assisted by Albanian underground members — including a beautiful young woman. Guest stars: James Best, Myron Healey, Marya Stevens, Gilbert Frye, Francis DeSales, and Olan Soule,.
10	"A Cover of Art"	Boris Sagal	George and Gertrude Fass	December 11, 1958
After atomic scientist Andrew Fleming bails out of a malfunctioning airplane over Czechoslovakia and is imprisoned by the communist government there and scheduled to go on trial, Commander Matson enters Czechoslovakia disguised as an art dealer to try to free him — and as the date of Fleming's trial approaches, Matson enlists the aid of Czechoslovak resistance fighters. Guest stars: Keith Richards, Florence Marly, John Banner, Anatol Winogradoff, Aaron Saxon, and Richard Flato.
11	"The Middle East Story"	John Peyser	Fenton Earnshaw	December 18, 1958
While Iraq is in the midst of a revolution, Israeli agent Jessica Tabor overhears a Communist plot to kill King Hussein of Jordan, and she enlists the help of U.S. agents James Foster and Harry Shaw to thwart the assassination attempt by warning the Government of Jordan to keep the king out of danger. Guest stars: Richard Webb, Ziva Rodann, John Sutton, Abraham Sofaer, and George Keymas.
12	"The Brioni Story"	Sam Gallu	Charles Bennett and John Hawkins	December 25, 1958
After becoming aware of a plot to kill Marshal Tito, the president of Yugoslavia, security forces under the command of General Racz place him under heavy guard, with no outsiders except for sculptor Sarah Fletcher allowed to see him — but U.S. agent Blake Adams, who is among those assigned to guard Tito, learns that the plot nonetheless is to be carried out very soon. Guest stars: Sheldon Laurence, Jeanette Sterke, Ferdy Mayne, Carl Duering, Eric Pohlmann, Carle Jaffe, and Glyn Owen.
13	"The Obelisk"	Unknown	Unknown	January 1, 1959
After a British atomic scientist steals important papers and decides to defect to the Soviet Union with them, he heads for the moors of Scotland to meet a Soviet helicopter — but two convicts intercept him along the way. Guest stars: Robert Ayres, Dermot Walsh, Edwin Richfield, Richard Shaw, Walter Gobell, and Richard Caldicot.
14	"The Germany Story"	Unknown	Unknown	January 8, 1959
Alternative title "Message from Mardenburg." A man named Dr. Haas takes charge of a German fencing society, planning to use its young members for subversive ends. Agent Peter Gebhardt joins the society in an attempt to learn Haas′s plans to overthrow the government of West Germany and install a Nazi regime. Guest stars: Carl Esmond, Richard Jaeckel, and Corey Allen.
15	"The Alkaloid Angle"	John Peyser	Richard Grey	January 22, 1959
After a U.S. agent is killed while investigating of a shipment of hashish to a port in Lebanon — part of a Communist plan to inflame the passions of revolutionary elements in the Middle East through the use of narcotics — agent Robert Hatfield comes out of retirement to work on the case and learns that a traitor has revealed his identity to the Communists. Guest stars: Frank Gerstle, Biff Elliott, Natalia Daryll, Harry Bartell, and Josh Franklyn.
16	"Crypto 40"	John English	John Hawkins	January 29, 1960
After scientist David Sparrow, who developed a code machine, is captured and held behind the Iron Curtain, Captain Early devises a scheme to rescue him before the Soviets can force him to make a similar machine for the Soviet Union. Guest stars: William Bishop, Osa Massen, Werner Klemperer, and Robert Cornthwaite.
17	"The Alaskan Story"	Oscar Rudolph	Fenton Earnshaw	February 5, 1959
A Communist spy ring is operating in Alaska, so Captain John Rand poses as a convict and enters a penitentiary, planning to befriend an imprisoned Communist agent and help him escape so that he will lead Rand to the rest of the ring. Guest stars: Brad Dexter, Don Haggerty, Frank Wilcox, Claudia Barrett, James Bell, and Milton Frome.
18	"The Quemoy Story"	John Peyser	Alan Caillou, Donn Mullally, and Arthur Fitz-Richard	February 12, 1959
After Communists kidnap U.S. agent Anna Sung in Macao, Commander Bennett and local police detective Mike Perrera search for her and discover a Communist plan to infiltrate and capture Quemoy. Guest stars: Robert Richards, Robert H. Harris, Robert Ellenstein, Paul Picerni, and Roberta Haynes.
19	"The Vicec Story"	Unknown	Unknown	February 19, 1960
Alternative title "The Espionage Students." Western agent Imre Vicec is killed while attempting to escape with photographs he took of a Communist spy-training school in Bulgaria, and U.S. agent David J. Thatcher receives an assignment to recover the photographs. Guest stars: Liliane Montevecchi, Dean Harens, Nestor Paiva, Otto Waldis, Anna-Lisa, and Richard Alexander.
20	"The Geneva Story"	John Peyser	Martin Berkeley	February 26, 1959
U.S. agent Nick Blake receives an assignment to find out why a former Soviet official has been released from prison to represent the Soviet Union at a nuclear weapons conference in Geneva, Switzerland, and the Soviets hire an American professional assassin to kill him just as the conference is about to begin. Guest stars: Dennis Patrick, Evy Norlund, Jan Arvan, Gregory Gaye, Wendell Holmes, Frank London, and Frank Richards.
21	"The Meeting"	John Peyser	Robert C. Dennis	March 5, 1959
Agent Ralph Drake travels to Austria to meet with Western agents from six Eastern Bloc countries after the Soviet Union appoints a new leader for its secret police. Guest stars: Ray Danton, David Opatoshu, Judith Braun, Virginia Gregg, Robert Warwick, Booth Colman, and Wolfe Barzell.
22	"Mightier Than the Sword"	John Peyser	Robert Leslie Bellem and Tony Barrett	March 12, 1959
After U.S. agent Douglas Kincaid infiltrates a Communist cell in San Francisco, California, he learns that a former top Soviet official, Feodor Mashay, wishes to defect to the West. Police raid the apartment in which the cell is meeting and arrest the participants, including Kincaid. Kincaid then is "deported" to Yalta in the Soviet Union — all part of a plan to put Kincaid in a position to help Mashay defect. Guest stars: Simon Scott, Chana Eden, Ben Astar, Robert Carricart, Steve Conte, and John Warburton.
23	"The Gamble"	John Peyser	Robert Leslie Bellem and Stanley H. Silverman	March 19, 1959
South Vietnamese Prince Tallat prepares a speech he plans to deliver at a conference in Huế, South Vietnam, of top-level statesmen of free nations of Southeast Asia about how to stop Communist infiltration from North Vietnam, hoping that his speech will turn the Vietnamese people against Communism. Before he can deliver it, however, Communists kidnap him along with his sister, Princess Santha, and demand that he change his speech to instead denounce Western imperialism — but a U.S. agent helps Tallat and Santha escape. Guest stars: Jeff Richards, Carol Thurston, Lewis Charles, Peter Votrian, Nyra Monsour, Leonard Graves, and Weaver Levy.
24	"Double Agent"	John Peyser	Donn Mullally and Arthur Fitz-Richard	March 26, 1959
A spy working for both the Eastern Bloc and the West is responsible for the shipment of arms to Western sympathizers behind the Iron Curtain, and a British counterintelligence agent tries to track him down. Guest stars: John Sutton, Liam Sullivan, Theodore Marcuse, Violet Rensing, and John Thye.
25	"The Antidote"	Unknown	Unknown	April 2, 1959
After Dr. Paul Matley invents an antidote for radiation poisoning, he and his wife Laura go to a nightclub, where Communist agents poison Laura — and the agents tell Matley that she will die if he does not turn the secret formula for the antidote over to them. Guest stars: John Lupton, Lawrence Dobkin, and Barney Phillips.
26	"Assignment Prague"	John Peyser	Alan Caillou	April 9, 1959
A U.S. agent posing as an American film director who has defected to the Eastern Bloc and been recruited by the Communists to make propaganda films for the Soviet Union is assigned to produce an anti-American film at a studio in Warsaw, Poland. He secretly uses the assignment to compile a documentary film about an anti-Communist uprising in Warsaw that has gone unreported in the West, which he plans to smuggle out of Poland so the United States can show it at the United Nations — but the head of the film project learns that at least some of her staff members are working against the Soviets, and she embarks on an effort to find them. Guest stars: Warren Stevens, Sue England, Berry Kroeger, Patricia Huston, Emil Sitka, and John Conwell.
