= Jacob M. Lomakin =

Soviet journalist, diplomat, and economist (1904–1958)

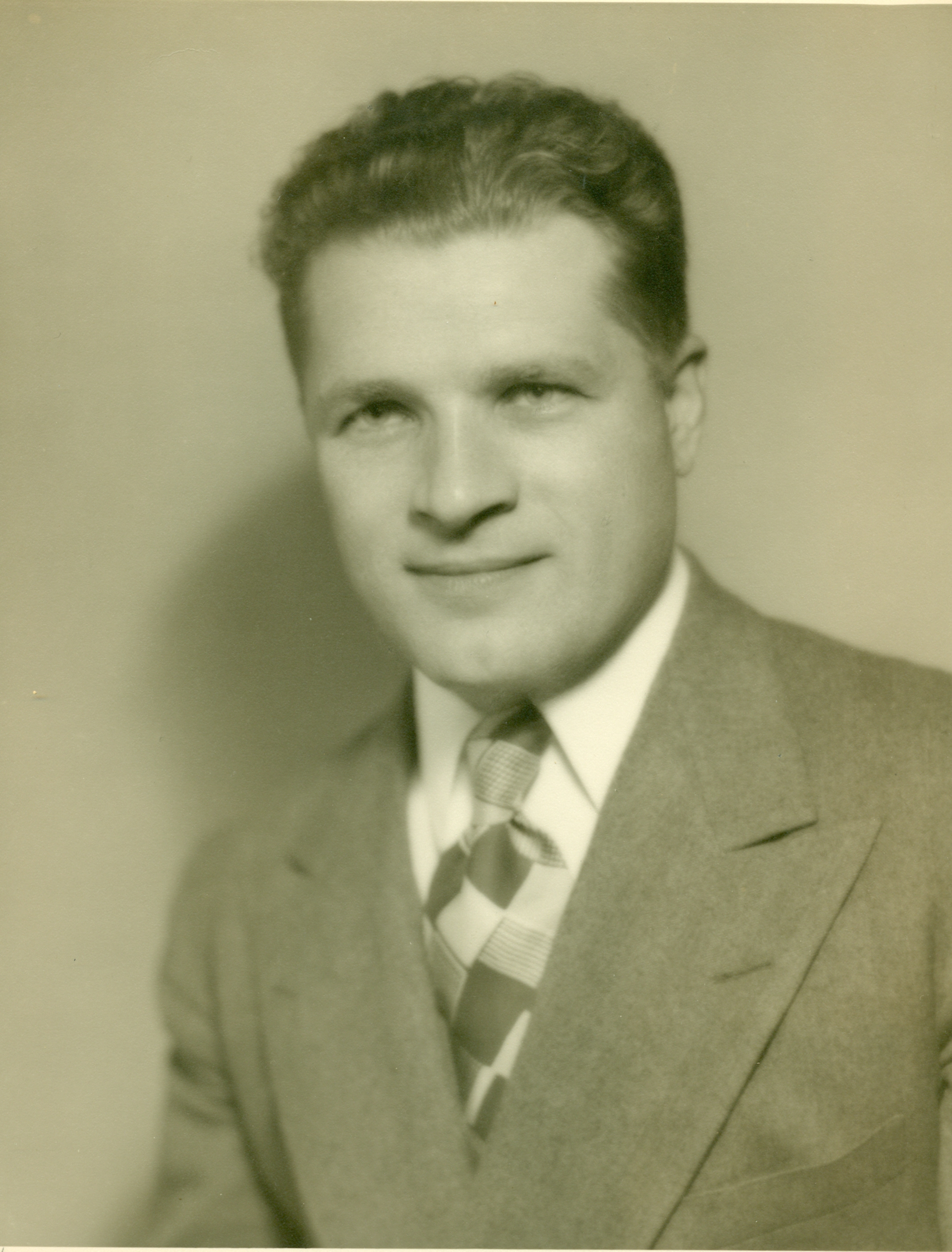
- Born: Yakov Mironovich Lomakin; November 4, 1904; Nizhny Shibryai, Borisoglebsky Uyezd, Tambov Governorate, Russian Empire
- Died: August 16, 1958 (aged 53); Moscow, Russian SFSR, Soviet Union
- Resting place: Novodevichy Cemetery
- Occupations: Diplomat, journalist, economist
- Spouse: Olga Lomakina (1912–2009)
- Children: Larisa and Alexei

Jacob Mironovich Lomakin (Russian: Яков Миронович Ломакин; November 4, 1904 – August 16, 1958) was a Soviet diplomat, journalist and economist.

== World War II US–Soviet Alliance (1942–1944) ==
In 1939 the graduate of the Moscow Textile Institute (with expertise in engineering and economics) and editor of newspaper “Light Industry” was appointed as TASS journalist in New York City. The eruption of WWII initiated Lomakin's diplomatic career: in 1941 as Vice-Consul in New York and in 1942–1944 as Consul General in San Francisco.

During the WWII U.S.–Soviet Alliance he was active in the Lend-Lease program and at meetings for raising funds to aid the Red Army. These meetings were funded by numerous anti-fascist organizations, among them the International Committee of the Red Cross, American Russian Institute and Russian War Relief. Together with progressive cultural figures, and military and governmental officials of the United States, Lomakin advocated the opening of the Second Front.

== Cold War (1946–48) – United Nations subcommittee on Freedom of Information and the Press ==
In 1946–1948 Lomakin combined the duties of Consul General in New York City with work at the United Nations (UN) subcommittee on Freedom of Information and the Press. "Mr. Lomakin was elected as an individual – rather than a member of the Soviet delegation by the Economic and Social Council. Members were to be chosen by the Human Rights Commission, in consultation with the Secretary General Trygve Lie." “Lomakin’s election confirms that his erudition in economics and journalism was widely known.” “A near-facsimile of cinemanful James Cagney, ebullient Consul Lomakin had no battery of deadpan advisers... Unlike icily aloof Andrei Gromyko, Lomakin chatted easily with whose near him. He called the other delegates “fellow experts” and he uttered such un-Soviet statements as “We don’t need to be consulting Moscow all the time,” and ”I will go along with what the majority thinks. …(when) the subcommission promptly voted – nine against Lomakin – to put censorship problem on the agenda. They seemed almost sorry to do it; he was such an agreeable Russian.” “Lomakin looks like a member of the Notre Dame backfield and talks like Sir George Bernard Shaw.” (Note: George Bernard Shaw was not a knight.)

At UN sessions, Lomakin opposed the incitement of hostility between the USSR and its WWII Allies, which, he said, day after day manifested itself in various forms in print and radio, and offered to focus on eradicating the consequences of fascism. He pointed out that if the media picks up and replicates the same version, then this lack of alternative is in itself censorship. Lomakin warned about the unlawful incitement of hatred. He insisted that journalists should be held accountable for the information they bring to the court of readers and listeners. According to him, “if the media is given too much freedom, they start trading news, as selling tobacco, thinking only about making the most profit.” In August 1948 the truthfulness of this remark came to life during the Kasenkina Case.

== August 1948, Kasenkina case ==
According to Ellis M. Zacharias (a retired Rear Admiral and senior Intelligence Officer of the US Navy) the personal tragedy of a mentally unstable Soviet school teacher, Oksana Kasenkina “was immensely overheated by the mass media into a noisy and ambiguous affair.” Her erratic behavior at the time of McCarthyism and the Berlin Blockade “was promptly used as a welcome opportunity for effective anti-Soviet propaganda... It was Mme Kasenkina whose fears and indecisions precipitated the crisis.” On July 31, 1948, she deserted her Soviet employers on the eve of her projected departure for Moscow. Vladimir Zenzinov, a former member of the Socialist Revolutionary Party brought her to Reed Farm belonging to the Tolstoy Foundation. Countess Alexandra Tolstoy provided her shelter and a job. She worked in the kitchen serving farm workers, many of whom were previously active in the White movement.

Five days later. the Soviet teacher smuggled a letter to Consul Lomakin. "The letter certainly imparted no suggestion that its author was driven by an overwhelming desire to begin life over in United States, borne aloft by her ardor for freedom and hatred of Soviet tyranny..." The letter's most unambiguous statement is in its concluding plea to the Consul: "I implore you, I implore you, don’t let me perish here. I have lost my will power." The letter ended with the handwritten address of the farm. Consulate primary activities include the protection of interest of their citizens temporary or permanently residing in the host country. Her plea for help was so imperative and personal that left Lomakin no alternative to take the dangerous mission to Reed Farm himself.

Before heading to the farm the Consulate requested help from the Police Dept. of New York – “the Consul General was going to Reed Farm to get a woman who was in a highly nervous state and asked for help”. When Lomakin arrived Kasenkina came out with a suitcase. A number of men attempted to forcibly restrain the executive car from leaving. After talking to Kasenkina Countess Tolstoy stopped them saying that the teacher decided to leave with the Consul “on her own free will”. As soon as the car left she called the nearby police station with a complaint. “Shortly after federal help had been enlisted a policemen who had been sent to the Farm returned with the information that the allegation that Kasenkina had been taken away by force had been withdrawn. Farm authorities, the policemen said, told him that they believed she had gone willingly.” Three hours after arriving at the Consulate Lomakin invited a large group of mass media workers for an emergency press conference. He showed Kasenkina's handwritten letter and read extracts in English translation. Photostatic copies of the letter were given to the United States Department of State and Federal Bureau of Investigation hoping for a fair resolution of the conflict.

On August 8, 1948, articles detailing the conference as “Red vs White woman “kidnapping” were printed in the Internationally circulated New York newspapers. Karl E. Mundt the representative of the House Un-American Activities Committee wanted to quiz the Soviet teacher as a link to spy case. “She must be trusted by the Russians because she had been selected to teach Russian children – “a job given only to people they can trust”. The following days the press and radio accused Lomakin of forcibly kidnapping Kasenkina and the letter was called a fake. Day and night the Consulate building on East 61st street was surrounded by reporters and anti-communists. On Aug.12, 1948 the New York State Supreme Court Justice Samuel Dickstein approved a habeas corpus, requiring Lomakin to produce the teacher to court. Paradoxically, in 1999 declassified Soviet files revealed that Dickstein, a former Democratic Congressmen, also known as the "father of McCarthyism", for many years was a paid spy for Soviet Secret Service NKVD. Lomakin refused, saying the teacher is sick.

The same day Kasenkina fell from a high third floor window to a concrete fenced yard. In Lomakin”s version, she jumped in suicidal despair. “At the hospital Kasenkina explained her action by the fact that she wanted to end it all." No statements about the desire to obtain political asylum. In the hospital communication of Kasenkina with Soviet representatives was banned, while visits by Vladimir Zenzinov, countess Tolstoy and reporters were permitted. The mass media called her action as "leap to freedom." and harshly predicted: "Soviet Consul May Face Firing Squad" and "Failure to Hold Kasenkina May Mean Death". “With headlines blazing and loudspeakers blaring … The judgement of some men who rushed headlong to Mme Kasenkina’s bedside to take charge of her relations with press and radio were not to be trusted… By inspiring headlines and stimulating the news stories below them, they drove the State Department to a diplomatic action whose severity was out of proportion to the incident.”

On August 19, 1948, the Department of State requested the President to revoke the exequatur issued to Consul General Lomakin. The same day President Truman approved the decision of the State Department. Consul General Lomakin was declared persona non grata on the grounds that he kidnapped a woman and held her in custody. The Kasenkina Case coincided in time with the neck-to-neck presidential campaign of President Harry Truman and New York Governor Thomas Dewey. The revoke of the exequatur came long before the State Department received translation of Kasenkina's letter and ahead of FBI graphology expertise that confirmed her handwriting. Walter Bedell Smith, the U.S. Ambassador to the Soviet Union, wrote of the negative impact the Kasenkina case had on the settlement of the Berlin Blockade. Cancellation of a high-ranking diplomat exequatur is rare and is always seen as a blow to the prestige of the country. In retaliation the Government of the USSR ended negotiations on lifting the Berlin Blockade, and closed its consulates in New York and San Francisco. According to Ellis M. Zacharias: “at the moment of Lomakin’s expulsion we lost the initiative to the Russians… became deprived of the major diplomatic listening post at the far end of the gigantic Soviet Empire... let the Berlin negotiations end in disagreement… a failure that was to cost us millions of dollars spent on the airlift.” He considered Lomakin as “a positive factor in Russo-American relations, one in a rapidly diminishing group of pro-American Soviet officials left behind from the short term of Maxim Litvinov in Washington. It was, therefore, both ill timed and ill advised to pick on Lomakin and to hand him his passport in a nebulous diplomatic fracas whose propaganda value had already been skillfully exploited." The USSR–US consular relations were restored only 24 years later, in 1972. On August 26, 1948, it was admitted: “Lomakin still a member of U.N. Sub-Group. Ousted Consul might claim immunity accorded to U.N. personnel to return here. On August 27, 1948 Jacob Lomakin with wife and two children boarded steamliner “Stockholm” and left the United States. The tickets were booked for a planned vacation six weeks before the Kasenkina case became an International incident.

Kasenkina's letters and other documents concerning the case were kept classified top secret by State Department and FBI for 50 years. They became open to the public in 1998 at the National Archives at College Park, Maryland.[50][51]

The Archives of the Russian and USSR Ministry of Foreign Affairs are kept classified unconventionally, wherefore little is known of Lomakin's activities during the last 10 years of his life.

1948–1949, Deputy Head of Press Department, USSR Ministry of Foreign Affairs

1949–1953, Deputy Head Department of Foreign Policy, CPSU Central Committee

1953–1956, Beijing, Minister Counselor of the USSR Embassy

1956–1958, Moscow, Counselor of the Department of International Organizations, USSR Ministry of Foreign Affairs

Jacob Lomakin died August 16, 1958 and was buried at the Novodevichy Cemetery.
