= Consulate General of the United States, Vladivostok =

U.S. Consulate General in Vladivostok
- Location: Vladivostok, Russia
- Address: Leninsky District, Pushkinskaya Street, 32
- Coordinates: 43°06′55″N 131°54′33″E
- Opening: September 22, 1992 (re-established)
- Closed: 2021
- Website: https://ru.usembassy.gov/embassy-consulates/vladivostok/

Consulate General of the United States, Vladivostok (Russian: Генеральное консульство США во Владивостоке) was a diplomatic mission of the United States in Vladivostok, providing consular services to Russian and American citizens in the Far East and in Eastern Siberia. The consulate was located in the Leninsky District of Vladivostok, at Pushkinskaya Street, house 32. It was closed in 2021 due to staffing shortages.

== History ==
The first U.S. consulate in Vladivostok was opened during the Russian Empire era in 1875. In 1898, U.S. Ambassador Hitchcock prompted the United States Congress to appropriate the supplies for an American consulate in Vladivostok because of the American trade with Siberia, seeking to increase trade by promoting direct shipping routes. This consulate was subsequently closed after the Soviet Revolution in 1923. In 1940, the Soviet Union gave the United States permission to re-open its consulate in Vladivostok. On May 16, 1941, the People's Commissariat for Foreign Affairs sent a note verbale to the United States Embassy in Moscow setting travel limitations on employees at the embassy and consulate. In August 1948, the Soviet Union closed its consulates in New York and San Francisco, meaning the reciprocal closing of the US consulates in Leningrad and Vladivostok.

The consulate was officially re-established on September 22, 1992, a year after the city was opened for visits by foreigners and Russian citizens in particular.

In March 2020, the Consulate General of the U.S. in Vladivostok fully suspended the issuance of visas and consular services due to the COVID-19 pandemic, while the U.S. Consulate in Yekaterinburg limited its services to emergency cases only. Soon afterwards, on April 1, 2021, it was announced that the U.S. Consulate in Vladivostok would not be able to resume operations due to a staff shortage, and it again suspended its activities indefinitely. According to Consul General Louis Krishok, visa and consular services will be provided only at the U.S. Embassy in Moscow and the U.S. consular agency in Yuzhno-Sakhalinsk.

The Consulate General of the U.S. in Vladivostok included: a visa department, a press and culture department, and a representation of the United States Department of Agriculture.

== Consuls general ==
List of United States Consuls General in Vladivostok
Name	Status	Official residence	Appointment	Termination	Source
William Morton	consul general		1875		
Richard Greener	commercial agent	Pennsylvania	1898	1905	
Roger S. Greene	commercial agent		1905	1908	
Harold F. New Hard	commercial agent		1909	1911	
? Maynard	commercial agent		1911	1914	
Randall Lecoq	consul general		1992	1994	
Desiree Millican	consul general		1994	1996	
Jane Miller Floyd	consul general		1996	1998	
Douglas Kent	consul general		1998	1999	
Lisbeth Rickerman	consul general		1999	2001	
James Schumaker	consul general		2001	2002	
Pamela Spratlen	consul general		2002	2004	
John M. Pommersheim	consul general		2004	2007	
Thomas Armbruster	consul general		2007	2010	
Patricia Miller	acting		2010	2010	
Sylvia Reed Curran	consul general		2010	2013	
Erik Anders Holm-Olsen	consul general		2013	2016	
Michael Keyes	consul general		2016	2019	
Louis Crishock	consul general		2019	2021	

== Bibliography ==
- Saul, Norman E. (1996). "Appendix D: Secretaries of Legation and Consuls in Russia". Concord and Conflict: The United States and Russia, 1867–1914. Lawrence: University Press of Kansas. pp. 597–600. ISBN 9780700607549.
- Zabriskie, Edward Henry (1946). American-Russian Rivalry in the Far East. Philadelphia: University of Pennsylvania Press.
