= Kasenkina Case =

1948 Cold War political scandal in New York

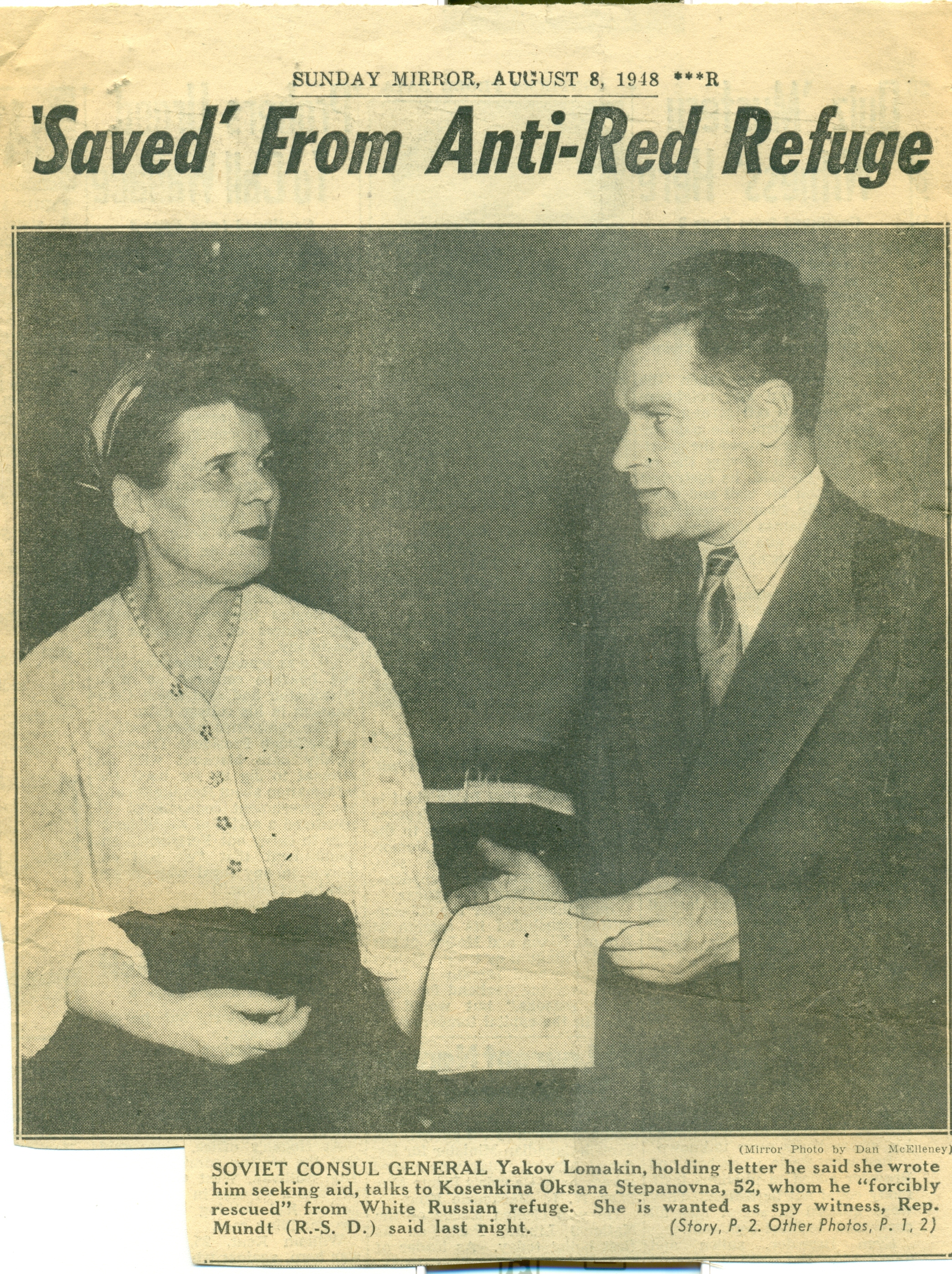
Soviet Consul General Jacob M. Lomakin holding letter from Kasenkina Oksana Stepanovna

The Kasenkina case (Russian: "Дело Касенкиной") was a 1948 Cold War-era political scandal associated with the name of Oksana Kasenkina (Russian: Оксана Касенкина), a teacher of chemistry at the Soviet school in New York. Kasenkina disappeared and was believed by the American public to have been abducted by Soviet officials after wishing to seek asylum in the United States. The events were sensationalized by the media and became part of the Red Scare. In reality, the most likely explanation of events is that Kasenkina suffered from a series of unfortunate events where she became a political chess piece during an unstable and tense period of international relations, and being left with a poor set of available options, facing deception from multiple sides, decided upon what was familiar and chose to return to the Soviet Union. The full scope of events only became clear 50 years later when the top-secret documents from the State Department and FBI were declassified and released to the public.

The events of the scandal took place in the context of McCarthyism and the Berlin Blockade, and received wide coverage in the mass media, and continues to receive attention today. Ellis M. Zacharias, a retired Rear Admiral and senior Intelligence Officer of the US Navy, wrote:

"Bigoted individuals should not be allowed dominant influence on the delicate conduct of our foreign relations – but soon it became evident that such persons had gained complete control of the case. By inspiring headlines and stimulating the news stories below them, they drove the State Department to a diplomatic action whose severity was out of proportion to the incident".

== Kasenkina's disappearance ==
After WWII, profound economic and political differences led to a confrontation between the allies that had defeated Nazi Germany. In 1946 the United States, United Kingdom, and France unified their occupation zones in Germany. The Marshall Plan was introduced to support the economic recovery of Western Europe and stop the expansion of Communism. In retaliation, the Soviet Government began the Berlin Blockade (June 24, 1948 – May 12, 1949) by halting all surface traffic communications (road, railroad, and canal transport) to West Berlin, which was located 100 miles (160 km) inside Soviet-controlled Eastern Germany. Diplomatic negotiations on the terms of lifting the blockade were moving slowly. As tensions continued to mount, the Soviets began to reduce the number of experts they sent to the United States.

In June 1948, the Soviet school in New York was closed on orders from Moscow. All teachers and students were to return to the USSR by September. On July 31, when the steamer "Pobeda" was scheduled to sail, the former headmaster and math teacher Mikhail Samarin was reported missing along with his wife (an English teacher) and their 3 children. Also missing was the 52-year-old chemistry teacher Oksana Kasenkina. On August 9, Samarin arrived at an FBI office and requested asylum for himself and his family, which was granted.

For 50 years and political reasons, the US State Department held the documents of the Kasenkina case as classified and top-secret. The documents declassified in 1998 and were made available to the public at the National Archives of the United States show that three days before her departure, at different times, two Russian-speaking men, chemist Dr. Alexander Korzhinsky and Leo Castello, independently started a conversation with Kasenkina on a park bench close to her place of residency. Korzhinsky invited her to his apartment for dinner; she refused to eat but complained that she did not want to return to the USSR. He advised her to seek help at the office of the anti-Soviet newspaper "The New Russian Word". On July 31, Vladimir Zenzinov, a journalist and former member of the Socialist-Revolutionary Party, took her to Reed farm in Valley Cottage belonging to the Tolstoy Foundation. The President of the Foundation, countess Alexandra Tolstaya, provided Kasenkina shelter and a job. The teacher worked in the kitchen and dining room serving farmworkers, many of whom previously served in the White Movement and the Russian Liberation Army and therefore distrusted the Soviet teacher.

== Letter to the Soviet consul ==
After five days at the farm, Kasenkina stopped a passing driver with a vegetable cart and secretly smuggled out a handwritten letter to the Consul-General of the USSR. On August 6, 1948, Consul Jacob M. Lomakin received the five-page muddled handwritten letter in which she complained of loneliness and a suicidal mood. Excerpts from the letter read: "the reaction of the already undermined organism has set in. You never considered it necessary to speak frankly with me... I was in despair, ready to commit suicide... . Finally, they began to persecute me, apparently being aware of my state of mind... . And then just before my departure, it seemed that they began to pay some attention to me, but I was already warned of my condition... ." Kasenkina used propaganda clichés about loyalty to the dictatorship of the working class, "devotion and love for the Fatherland and her "hatred for traitors."

The letter contained no information on how she came to the farm. The flow of the letter was disjointed, and concluded with a plea to the Consul: "I implore you, I implore you, don’t let me perish here. I have lost my will-power." The unsigned letter ended with the handwritten address of the farm.

== Kasenkina departs with the consul ==
On August 7, before starting to the farm, Lomakin called the Missing Persons Bureau, Police Dept of New York and asked for support. According to The New York Times, Capt. John J. Cronin confirmed the call from the Consulate at 12:15 pm. "He said that the Russian Consul General was going to Reed Farm to get a woman who was in a highly nervous state and asked for help." Capt. Cronin informed the New City Barracks nearest to Reed farm. A trooper was dispatched to the farm, but did not arrive until after the car sent by the consulate for Kasenkina had already departed.

On August 12, 1948, Countess Alexandra Tolstaya testified under oath at the New York Supreme Court and described what transpired. A black Buick executive car with a driver carrying the Consul, the vice-consul Zot Chepurnykh and stenographer named Maria Kharlamova arrived, and Kasenkina took her suitcase and walked out to meet them. Countess Tolstaya ordered 12 men to surround the diplomat's car. She called Kasenkina into the house, locked the door and tried to convince the teacher not to leave with the Soviets. Kasenkina insisted on leaving, repeating – "I must go, I must go". Upon Kasenkina's insistence, Tolstaya told the men not to hold the car, since Kasenkina decided to leave with the Consul "of her own free will."

== Press conference at the consulate ==
Upon returning to the consulate, Lomakin invited a large group of journalists. In an emergency press conference Kasenkina described how she was drugged and kidnapped by "White Russian bandits". Lomakin showed the envelope and Kasenkina's handwritten letter. He read aloud extracts from the letter in English translation. The photostatic copy was given to the United States Department of State and Federal Bureau of Investigation. On August 8, all major US newspapers released photos from the press conference, and The New York Times and New Herald Tribune published detailed reports. Countess A. Tolstaya stated that she was against providing shelter to Kasenkina believing she was sent as a spy to determine the location of the Samarins. Another newspaper printed a statement by Congressman Karl Mundt, a member of the HUAC requiring that Kasenkina should be questioned as a witness of USSR espionage activities.

Headlines of other newspapers claimed that the teacher was kidnapped from her hiding place at the farm of anti-communists and the letter to the Consul was called a fake. The Consul gave the photocopy of the letter into the hands of the representatives of the U.S. State Department, hoping for a fair resolution of the conflict. Publication of the letter would demonstrate that Kasenkina came to the Consulate of "her own free will". The press and radio accused Lomakin of kidnapping, and of faking the letter. Journalists and anti-Soviet demonstrators surrounded the building continuously for days.

According to the memoirs of Kasenkina, ghost written by anticommunist writer Isaac Don Levine, she had a private room and moved freely within the consulate. On August 12, former New York Democratic Congressman and New York State Supreme Justice Samuel Dickstein issued a habeas corpus writ ordering the Consul General to produce Kasenkina to the Supreme Court for questioning the next day. Lomakin refused, stating that the teacher was sick. Dickstein responded: "he would order the sheriff to seize Mrs. Kasenkina if necessary. Immunity given to Lomakin and his staff does not extend to the teacher". In 1999, declassified Soviet files revealed that Dickstein, known as the "father of McCarthyism", for many years was a paid agent of the Soviet secret service agency NKVD. The file documents indicate that his handlers gave him a code name "crook" ("zhulik" in Russian) for his efforts to extract as much money as possible for his services.

== Fall from consulate window ==
On August 12, after five days at the consulate, Kasenkina fell from a high third floor window to the building's concrete fenced yard. She survived and was taken to the hospital. In Lomakin's version, she had jumped in suicidal despair. Four inspectors of the New York Police headed by Deputy Chief Inspector Conrad Rotingast were allowed by Lomakin to enter the consulate building and inspect the teacher's room for a possible suicide note. They found a sealed letter addressed to Moscow, which was translated by an FBI translator, after which a photostat was made and "the letter was returned to the Consulate unopened".

In the letter, written to her friends or relatives on June 10, 1948, Kasenkina wrote: "We shall see one another very, very soon. I dream every day, every hour, and every minute of the moment of our meeting... It seems that even now I see the shores of our distant, vast and beloved Fatherland!.." Graphology practitioners decided both letters were written by Kasenkina. Susan Carruthers, a history professor at Rutgers University wrote in her book Prisoners of the Cold War: Imprisonment, Escape and Brainwashing: "In the first 6 hours at the hospital Kasenkina explained her action by the fact that she wanted to end it all."

She made no statements about a desire to obtain political asylum. In the hospital, Kasenkina was banned from communicating with Soviet representatives, while visits by Zenzinov, Tolstaya and reporters were permitted. The mass media called her action a "leap to freedom" and harshly predicted: "Soviet Consul May Face Firing Squad" and "Failure to Hold Kasenkina May Mean Death".

On August 28, 1948, two weeks after the incident, a BBC newsreel clip titled "MRS Kasenkina tells her story", shows a bedridden Kasenkina. When asked why she jumped, she mumbled in Russian almost the exact words from her letter to the Consul-General: "I have repeatedly asked you to tell me frankly everything that you know..." Her words were mistranslated by interpreter Luba Trepak, who instead spoke of her leap to freedom. Ellis M. Zacharias writes "the judgement of some of the men who rushed headlong to Mme Kasenkina’s bedside to take charge of her relations with the press and radio were not to be trusted. Their anti-Soviet record had been remarkable for its senseless and vindictive venom rather than for its effectiveness."

For weeks, Voice of America radio ran the story of Kasenkina overseas in 22 languages, including Russian. In retaliation, the Soviets jammed Russian VOA programs, including music. For decades, mass media revived the Kasenkina case without mentioning her emotional instability and erratic behavior. For 50 years, the US State Department kept all documents and text of her letters classified as well as that the graphologist claimed the letters were authentic. Acting Police Commissioner Thomas F. Mulligan, who was in charge of investigating the Kasenkina Case, asked State Department Spokesman Michael J. McDermott for English translations of both mysterious letters, but they were never turned over to the police or press. On September 21, 1948, State Department acting legal adviser Jack B. Tate wrote a letter to Kasenkina's lawyer, Archie Owen Dawson, suggesting that "inasmuch as the letters are presumably the personal property of Mrs. Kasenkina, the question of releasing them to the press is a matter for her decision so far as the Department of State is concerned."

Despite demands for her return by Soviet Ambassador Aleksandr Panyushkin, Kasenkina stayed in the US. In 1951 she received a US residence permit, and in 1956 became a US citizen. She died of heart failure in Miami on July 24, 1960.

== Severance of consulate ties and end of Berlin negotiations ==
On August 19, 1948, the Department of State requested that the President revoke the exequatur issued to Consul General Lomakin. The same day President Truman approved the decision of the State Department. Consul General Lomakin was declared a persona non grata on the grounds that he kidnapped a woman and held her in custody. The Kasenkina Case coincided with the tightly contested presidential campaign of President Harry Truman and New York Governor Thomas Dewey.

The revoking of the exequatur came before the State Department received the translation of Kasenkina's letters and the circulation of the graphology expert's report. Cancellation of a high-ranking diplomat exequatur is rare, and can be considered as a major escalation of political conflict. In retaliation, the government of the USSR ended negotiations on lifting the Berlin Blockade, and closed its consulates in New York and San Francisco, which by protocol meant closing of US consulates in Leningrad and Vladivostok. Secretary of State George C. Marshall said Russia's reprisal for ousting Lomakin was "regrettable, but not serious."

Consular relations between the USSR and the US were restored only after 24 years in 1972. In his 1952 book, Ellis M. Zacharias writes: "In the moment of Lomakin’s expulsion we lost the initiative to the Russians... we became deprived of a major diplomatic listening post in the far East". In addition to the closing of consulates, termination of Berlin blockade negotiations cost the United States millions of dollars which were spent on airlifting food to the 2.5-million residents of West Berlin.
