= Alexandra Tolstaya =

Russian writer

Alexandra Lvovna Tolstaya
- Born: 18 June 1884; Yasnaya Polyana, Russia
- Died: 26 September 1979 (aged 95); Valley Cottage, New York, U.S.
- Parent(s): Leo Tolstoy; Sophia Tolstaya

Countess Alexandra (Sasha) Lvovna Tolstaya (Russian: Александра Львовна Толстая; 18 June 1884 – 26 September 1979), often anglicized to Tolstoy, was the youngest daughter and secretary of the noted Russian novelist Leo Tolstoy.

== Biography ==
The youngest daughter of Leo Tolstoy (1828–1910) and of his wife Sophia (1844–1919), Alexandra was close to her father. In 1901, at the age of seventeen, she became his secretary. He appointed her as executor of his will, a task she had to undertake in 1910. Although Alexandra shared her father's belief in non-violence, she felt it was her duty to take part in the events of the First World War and served as a nurse on the Turkish and German fronts. This led to her being gassed and admitted to hospital herself. After the war, she worked on an edition of her father's writings. However, after allowing White Russians to meet in her Moscow home, she was arrested five times by the Bolsheviks and in 1920 was sent to prison for a year.

In 1921 she became the director of the Tolstoy museum at Yasnaya Polyana. She was given permission to leave the Soviet Union in 1929 and went to Japan in the same year. Originally given permission to stay for six months to study schools, she ultimately stayed in the country for 18 months. She worked as a lecturer on Tolstoy and as a Russian teacher, and was supported by Japanese literary and academic circles.

In 1931 she left Japan and settled in the United States, where she gave lectures and worked as a chicken farmer. Some years into this life, she was visited by Tatiana Schaufuss, an old friend who had spent several years in prison and in exile in Siberia. Together, in 1939 they founded the Tolstoy Foundation.

In 1934, she authored a book about her life entitled "I Worked for the Soviet" and it was published by Yale University Press. The book details the difficulties she faced living in Russia during and after the revolution.

Tolstaya became a naturalized U.S. citizen in 1941, abandoning the use of the title of countess.

After the war she invited her niece Vera Tolstoy to move to the United States. Vera lived in the U.S. until her death.

In the summer of 1948, Tolstaya met 18 year old future United States Senator Mike Gravel, who had intended to volunteer for the Israeli forces in a fight to defend the state of Israel, and she allegedly told him to instead "go on back home and finish school", to which he complied.

In 1974, at the age of ninety, Tolstaya received birthday greetings from President of the United States Richard Nixon, Alexander Solzhenitsyn, and others, and was interviewed by The New York Times. Her father having been excommunicated from the Russian Orthodox Church for his teachings, she commented:

“I don't believe in everything the Orthodox Church says, I don't believe in miracles, but want the people to go to church. Maybe my father could live without church and without God, but we weaker people need something to support us. They will say I am old fashioned, but I am afraid for this country, because of lack of religion among the young ones, drugs, immorality and the shamelessness of youth.”

In 1977, Tolstaya introduced and narrated a claymation adaptation of her father's short story “Where Love Is, God Is”, under the title "Martin the Cobbler", co-written and directed by Will Vinton and animated by his team of animators at Will Vinton Studios.

Tolstaya died on September 26, 1979, in Valley Cottage, New York at the age of 95.

== Sources ==
- Rayfield, Donald, Stalin and His Hangmen, Random House, 2004, ISBN 0-375-75771-6.
