= Sarah R. Lotfi =

American filmmaker (born 1988)

Sarah R. Lotfi is an American filmmaker best known for her short film Menschen.

== Student Film Career ==
While studying film and production at the University of Colorado, her original script Heard received special honorable mention in the 2007 American Gem Short Screenplay competition. Lotfi's first student short Tudor Rose premiered in CineYouth with the Chicago International Film Festival in 2008. Her next short The Last Bogatyr, premiered at Los Angeles Women's International Film Festival in 2009. The same year the Academy of Motion Picture Arts and Sciences awarded The Last Bogatyr as a regional winner and national finalist in the 37th Student Academy Awards.

During the summer of 2010, Lotfi resided in Los Angeles for the Academy of Television Arts & Sciences Foundation's National College TV Internship professional development program on the production of HBO Films' Cinema Verite (2011 film). The following year in 2011, her final student film Waking Eyes premiered at the Los Angeles Women's International Film Festival.

== Menschen ==
In 2012, while finishing her final semester Lotfi began production on her debut independent short Menschen. Set in the final days of WWII, Menschen follows an Austrian captain's choice to protect a boy with a developmental disability which tests the loyalty of his men to the limit.

Taking inspiration in the stories from her mentor and film professor Robert von Dassanowsky's experiences of his father's retreat to avoid surrendering to the Soviet Army at the end of the war, Lotfi's original screenplay presents a story of survival against the horrors of the notorious Nazi Aktion T4 program. The choice to characterize displacement through an adolescent character with Down syndrome was deeply personal for Lotfi as the biological sister to siblings with the developmental disability. Casting the then teenaged Connor Long lead to his performance receiving the 'Best Actor' award at the Filmstock Film Festival.

Menschen premiered at Phoenix Film Festival in 2013. The film has been recognized with a 'Special Jury Award' at Worldfest Housten, 'Best Short Film', 'Audience Choice' and 'Best Short' at Life Fest Film Festival, and 'Best of Fest' in addition to 'Best Actor' at Filmstock Film Festival.

Special interest screenings of Menschen continued with the Global Down Syndrome Foundation and regional chapters of the Arc. Through a special partnership with the Arc of the United States, Menschen also received a limited theatrical release in Los Angeles. Distributed by Shorts International, Menschen streamed on demand over iTunes, Amazon Prime, and Google Play.

In 2014, Lotfi was invited by the World Intellectual Property Organization to screen Menschen and present on independent filmmaking in Geneva, Switzerland and New York.

In 2015, Lotfi participated in the Golden Egg Competition with Menschen for the Transatlantic Talent Lab with Reykjavik International Film Festival in Iceland.

== CineVIA Pictures ==
In 2015, Lotfi formed CineVIA Pictures with Menschen producers Anastasia Cummings and Mike Newman to recruit and source projects for Colorado based creative talent.

Lotfi directed the commercial Colorado Revealed: Worlds Within for the Colorado Film Commission and was awarded 'Most Voted Film' with Audience Awards in 2016. In the same year, Lotfi participated in a panel on independent filmmaking for the One Nation Film Festival.

The following year, in 2017, CineVIA Pictures participated in Series Fest's 48-hr challenge to produce Dis-Oriented, a 'choose-your-own-adventure' style interactive multimedia pilot for Eko.

== Brand Content, EdTech, Dog and Rose Media ==
In 2018, Lotfi launched her production company, Dog and Rose Media to produce commercial content for brands and narrative entertainment.

Since 2021, Lotfi has served as the Senior Video Producer at Petersons leading development over a range of educational video content for the EdTech brand and product lines.

In 2022, Dog and Rose Media debuted the French-language version of Lotfi's short, Knight to Queen in France at Festival International du Film de Fiction Historique.
