= Bernard Delfgaauw =

Dutch philosopher and professor (1912–1993)

- Delfgaauw in 1967
- Born: Bernardus Maria Ignatius Delfgaauw; 24 November 1912
- Died: 20 August 1993 (aged 80)

Philosophical work
- Era: 20th-century
- Region: Western philosophy
- School: Neo-Thomism

Bernardus Maria Ignatius "Bernard" Delfgaauw (24 November 1912 – 20 August 1993) was a Dutch philosopher. He studied the Dutch language and Thomistic philosophy at the University of Amsterdam. In 1947 he earned his doctoral degree on the French metaphysician Louis Lavelle. In 1961 he became a professor in philosophy at the University of Groningen.

Delfgaauw was a prolific writer; subjects included existentialism, young Marx, Thomas Aquinas, Kant, mysticism, evolution, and he developed a philosophy of grammar and of social relations. He also wrote a bestselling concise history of philosophy that was in continuous reprint and got translated into several languages.

During the Vietnam War, it was legally prohibited and punishable by law in the Netherlands to say that Lyndon B. Johnson was a killer. In 1967 Bernard Delfgaauw said at a symposium: "Measured by criteria used in Nuremberg and Tokyo, Johnson, his staff members, and generals are war criminals." After that, the Dutch student protesters wantonly changed their slogan from "Johnson Killer" to "Johnson Miller".

== Bibliography ==
- Teilhard de Chardin (1961)
- De filosofie van Bernard Delfgaauw (1982) together with Reinout Bakker and Huib Hubbeling
- Bernard Delfgaauw et al. Evolutie en de filosofie, de biologie, de kosmos Utrecht 1967
