= Richard S. Davies =

American politician

Member of the Maine House of Representatives
- In office 1974–1982

Personal details
- Born: Richard Stuart Davies; August 21, 1947 Plainfield, New Jersey, U.S.
- Died: September 19, 2023 (aged 76) Farmingdale, Maine, U.S.
- Party: Democratic
- Education: University of Maine

Richard Stuart Davies (August 21, 1947 – September 19, 2023) was an American politician. A member of the Democratic Party, he served in the Maine House of Representatives from 1974 to 1982.

Davies died in Farmingdale, Maine on September 19, 2023, at the age of 76.
