= Ellis M. Zacharias =

U.S. Navy rear admiral

RADM Ellis Mark Zacharias
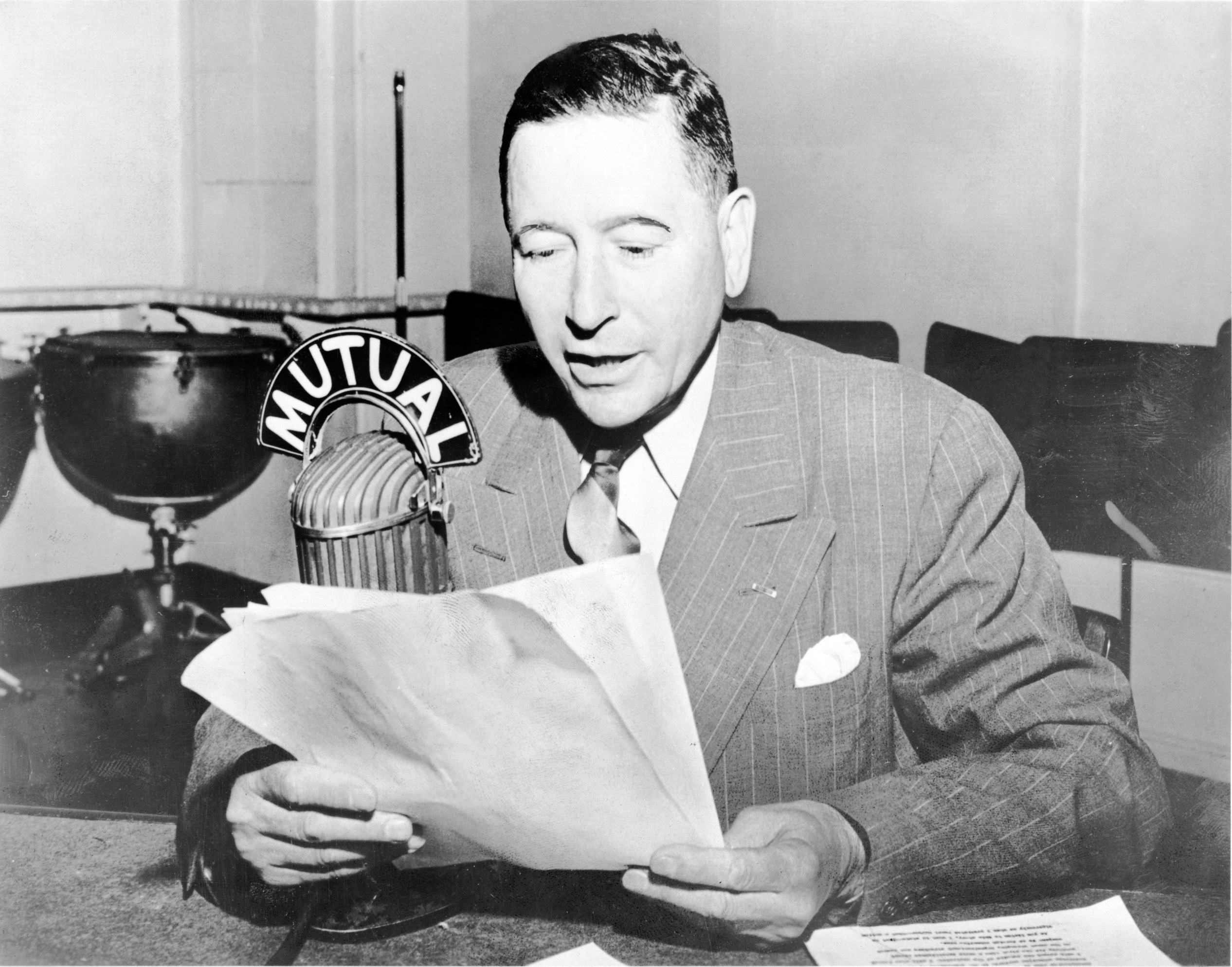
- Born: January 1, 1890; Jacksonville, Florida, US
- Died: 27 June 1961 (aged 71); West Springfield, New Hampshire, US
- Burial place: Arlington National Cemetery
- Education: United States Naval Academy
- Military career
- Allegiance: United States
- Branch: United States Navy
- Service years: 1912–1946
- Rank: Rear admiral
- Commands: USS Salt Lake City (CA-25); Deputy director, Office of Naval Intelligence; USS New Mexico (BB-40)
- Conflicts: World War I World War II: Pacific Theater
- Awards: Legion of Merit (two gold stars); Navy Commendation Medal; Mexican Service Medal; United States WWI Victory Medal; Yangtze Service Medal; American Defense Service Medal; Asiatic-Pacific Campaign Medal; American Campaign Medal; World War II Victory Medal
- Other work: Author, radio host, television host

Ellis Mark Zacharias (January 1, 1890 – June 27, 1961) was an American rear admiral of the United States Navy who served during both World War I and World War II. Over a 34-year career, he held various roles, including naval attaché to Japan and deputy director of U.S. Naval Intelligence. After retiring in 1946 for health reasons, Zacharias became a public figure through his work as a narrator for the radio series Secret Missions and the television docudrama Behind Closed Doors.

== Biography ==
Born in Jacksonville, Florida, Zacharias graduated from the United States Naval Academy in 1912. His early assignments included service aboard the USS Arkansas (BB-33), which escorted President William Howard Taft to inspect the Panama Canal, and the USS Virginia (BB-13).

In the 1920s, Zacharias was stationed as a naval attaché at the U.S. Embassy in Tokyo, where he gained experience in Japanese culture, politics, and military strategy. This knowledge informed his work during World War II. From 1940 to 1942, he commanded the USS Salt Lake City (CA-25), which was part of the force that escorted Lieutenant General James H. Doolittle during the 1942 bombing raid over Japan. Upon returning to the United States, he served from June 1942 until August 1943, as deputy director of the Office of Naval Intelligence. In this capacity he was awarded the Legion of Merit, his citation reading, in-part, "(f)or exceptionally meritorious conduct… while acting as a advisor and liaison officer between the Office of Naval Intelligence and the Office of Strategic Services from May 10 to 1 September 1943." From September 1943 to September 1944 he served as the commanding officer of the USS New Mexico (BB-40); under his command, the New Mexico was the first of the "old"-type battleships to operate alongside escort carriers. During the war, he also conducted radio broadcasts aimed at undermining Japanese morale, an early example of modern psychological warfare.

From 1944 to his (military) retirement in 1946, Zacharias served in various senior staff and advisory positions, including with the Navy Department's Office of Public Information and the United States Office of War Information.

Post-retirement, he authored books and narrated media projects based on his military service and naval intelligence experiences. Most notably, he authored Secret Missions and would host a radio program under the same name; both discussed "secret" missions undertaken by military intelligence operatives during WWII. He would host a television series from 1958 to 1959, Behind Closed Doors, which explored Cold War espionage and naval intelligence, drawing on his own expertise.

He died on June 27, 1961, at his home in West Springfield, New Hampshire, at the age of 71. Zacharias was interred at Arlington National Cemetery.
