= Tolstoy Foundation =

American non-profit charitable and philanthropic organization

The Tolstoy Foundation is a non-profit charitable and philanthropic organization. It was established on April 26, 1939, by Alexandra Tolstaya, the youngest daughter of the Russian writer Leo Tolstoy, and her friend Tatiana Schaufuss. Its headquarters are in Valley Cottage, New York.

== Activities ==
Its original purpose was to help Russian refugees from Europe and the Soviet Union. Later, the foundation played an important role in helping Soviet displaced persons, dissidents and former Soviet citizens to settle in the West. Presently among its goals the foundation lists education and training programs worldwide. Tolstoy Foundation has many branches of humanitarian organizations: it has elderly care homes, homes for orphaned children, free cultural institutes and kindergarten and education institutes.

== Officials ==
President

- Alexandra Tolstaya 1939–1976
- Tatiana Schaufuss 1976–1986
- Teymuraz K. Bagration 1986–1992
- Andrew Kotchoubey, PhD 1992–1996

The position of President was eliminated in 1996.

Chairman

- Plato Malozemoff
- Constantine Sidamon-Eristoff
- Eugenia Jahnke
- Boris Vanadzin, MD 1992–2009

== Sources ==
- Tolstoy Foundation homepage
- Orthodox organisations of America
