= Consulate General of the United States, Saint Petersburg =

U.S. Consulate General in St. Petersburg
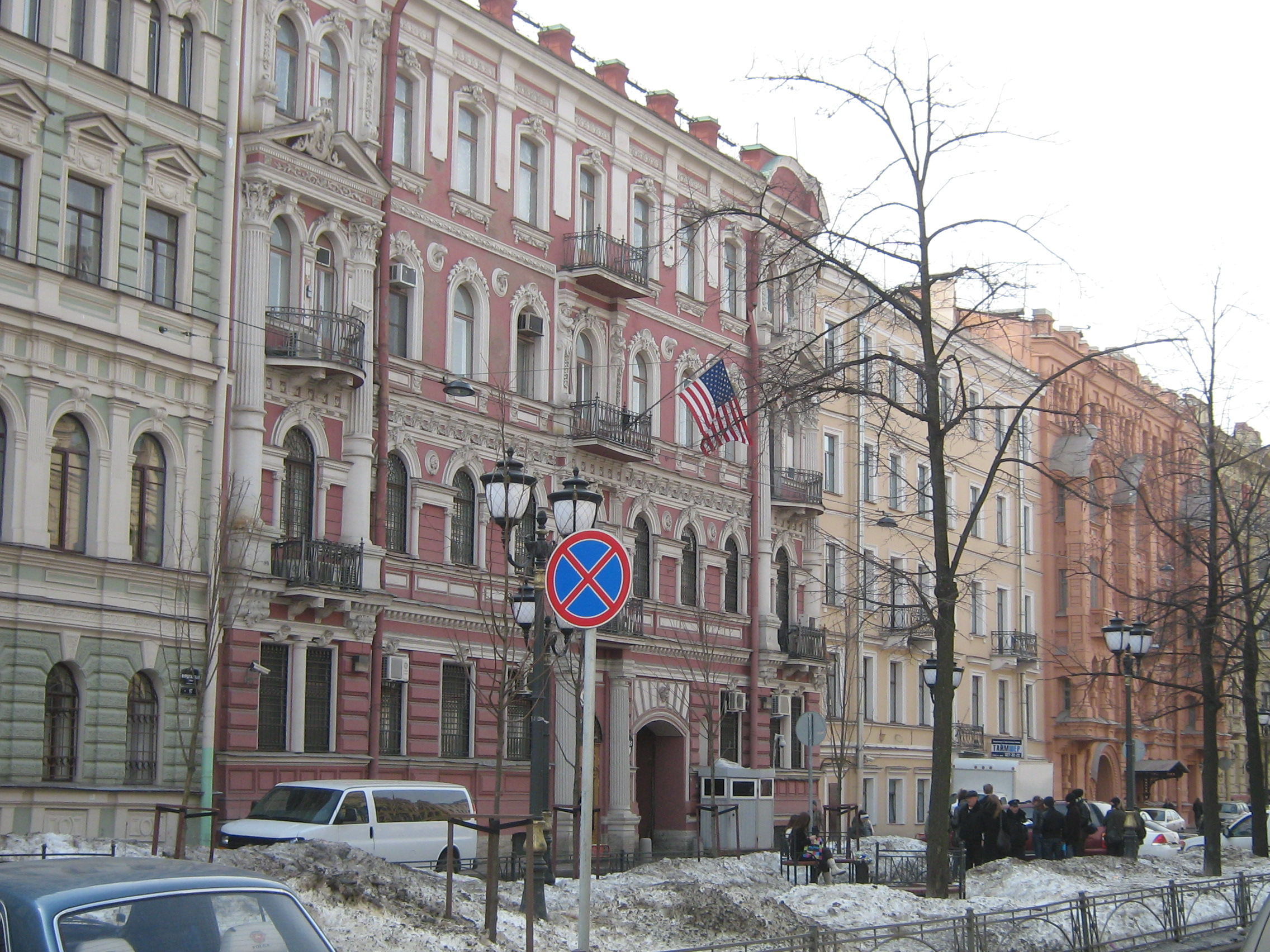
- Location: Saint Petersburg, Russia
- Address: Central District, 15 Furshtatskaya Street
- Coordinates: 59°56′41″N 30°21′16″E
- Closed: March 31, 2018
- Website: Archived official website

The U.S. Consulate General in St. Petersburg (Russian: Генеральное консульство США в Санкт-Петербурге) is a former diplomatic mission of the US in Saint Petersburg, providing consular services to Russian and American citizens in Northwestern Russia. The consulate general ceased its operations on March 31, 2018, at the request of the Russian authorities.

== History ==
The official American diplomatic representation in the Russian Empire was originally located in Saint Petersburg since the establishment of diplomatic relations in 1780. However, the credentials of Francis Dana were not accepted by the Russian court, thus making John Quincy Adams the first accredited Ambassador of the United States to Russia, who presented his credentials to Tsar Alexander I of Russia on November 5, 1809. When the Adams arrived at Saint Petersburg, Louisa hired a French chef to entertain a number of guests, including the Baroness Stroganova, the Bettancourts and the Colombis. But the cook forgot to make soup, to the distress of the guests, and subsequently of Adams. They always served soup after that.

In November 1863, William E. Phelps was appointed Consulate General, where he served for three years. The U.S. Embassy in Russia existed until 1919, when Ambassador David Francis left Russia during the Russian Civil War.

It resumed its work in 1933 in the USSR and in its new capital – Moscow. The U.S. Consulate General in Leningrad was opened in 1972 in the former revenue house of Schreyer. The consular district included ten subjects of the Russian Federation, covering, in addition to Saint Petersburg, Arkhangelsk Oblast, Vologda Oblast, Kaliningrad Oblast, Leningrad Oblast, Murmansk Oblast, Novgorod Oblast, and Pskov Oblast, Republic of Karelia, and Nenets Autonomous Okrug.

In March 2018, following the Poisoning of Sergei and Yulia Skripal, the U.S. authorities announced that the Consulate General of the Russian Federation in Seattle must cease its operations. In response, Russia decided to close the U.S. Consulate in Saint Petersburg and expel 60 American diplomats from Russia. On March 31, diplomats removed office equipment, paintings, and furniture from the building, and on the evening of March 31, the mission staff removed the American flag from the building.

The Consulate General of the U.S. in Petersburg included: a consular section, political-economic section, press and culture department, U.S. Commercial Service, and representation of the United States Department of Agriculture.

== Consuls General ==
List of United States Chief Diplomats in Saint Petersburg
Name	Status	Official residence	Appointment	Arrival	Exequatur	Termination	Sources
Francis Dana	minister	Saint Petersburg	1780-12-19	August 1781	N/A (Note: Never presented his credentials.)	August 1783	
John Miller Russell	consul	Saint Petersburg	1794-11-24	1795 (spring/summer)	N.A. (Note: He presented his credentials only to be informed that the Russian Government was not prepared to accept them.)	N/A (Note: He remained in Saint Petersburg several years after his credentials were rejected, but as a commission merchant.)	
Levett Harris	consul	Saint Petersburg	1803-04-03	October 1803	1803-11-10	July 1816 (Note: At times held several posts simultaneously, but did not relinquish his consulship until this date.)	
William Short	minister	Saint Petersburg	August 1808	N/A (Note: Never reached Saint Petersburg.)	N/A	March 1809 (Note: The United States Senate rejected Short's nomination, and President Thomas Jefferson withdrew the nomination accordingly.)	
John Quincy Adams	minister	Saint Petersburg	1809-06-27	October 1809	1809-11-17	April 1814 (late)	
William Steuben Smith	secretary of legation, interim chargé d'affaires (from late April 1814)	Saint Petersburg	1812-07-02	1812-07-02	N/A	1814-07-17	
Levett Harris (2nd term)	chargé d'affaires	Saint Petersburg	1814-04-19		1814-07-17 (entered duty)	1817-01-21	
William Pinkney	minister						
George Pomutz	consul general	Iowa	1865			1878	
George Henry Prince	interim	Saint Petersburg	1875			1877	
William Henry Edwards	consul general	Ohio	1878			1880	
Gaun M. Hutton	interim	Saint Petersburg	1879			1883	
Edgar Stanton	consul general	Illinois	1881			1885	
Pierce M. B. Young	consul general	Georgia	1885			1887	
James V. R. Swann	interim	Saint Petersburg	1885			1886	
George Osgood Prince	interim	Saint Petersburg	1886			1887	
William Henry Dunster	interim	Saint Petersburg	1887			1897	
Charlton H. Way	consul general	Georgia	1887			1889	
John M. Crawford	consul general	Ohio	1889			1894	
Charles Jonas	consul general	Ohio	1894			1894	
John Karel	consul general	Illinois	1894			1897	
William R. Holloway	consul general	Indiana	1897			1903	
Ethelbert Watts	consul general		1903			1907	
John Mueller	interim	Saint Petersburg	1902			1906	
Jacob Conner	consul		1908			1914	
Morris N. Hughes Jr.			2002			2005	
Mary A. Krueger			2005			2008	
Sheila Gwaltney			2008			2011	
Bruce Turner			2011			2014	
Courtney Nemroff	acting		2014			2015	
Thomas Leary			2015			2018	

== See also ==
- List of diplomatic missions of the United States
- List of diplomatic missions in Russia
- Russia–United States relations

== Bibliography ==
- Paulson, Svetlana E. (2023-05-12). "Ordeal by Dinner: US Diplomats and Food Culture in the Russian Empire". Journal of Russian American Studies. 7 (1): 1–16. doi:10.17161/jras.v7i1.20344. eISSN 2473-7348.
- PUP (2021). "Thomas Jefferson to Levett Harris, 27 July 1809". Founders Online.
- Saul, Norman E. (1996). "Appendix D: Secretaries of Legation and Consuls in Russia". Concord and Conflict: The United States and Russia, 1867–1914. Lawrence: University Press of Kansas. pp. 597–600. ISBN 9780700607549.
- Bashkina, Nina N.; et al. (1980). "U.S. Diplomatic and Consular Appointments to Russia, 1780–1815". The United States and Russia: The Beginning of Relations, 1765–1815. Washington: United States Government Printing Office. pp. 1111–1112. LCCN 80-607939.
