= Russian Empire–United States relations =

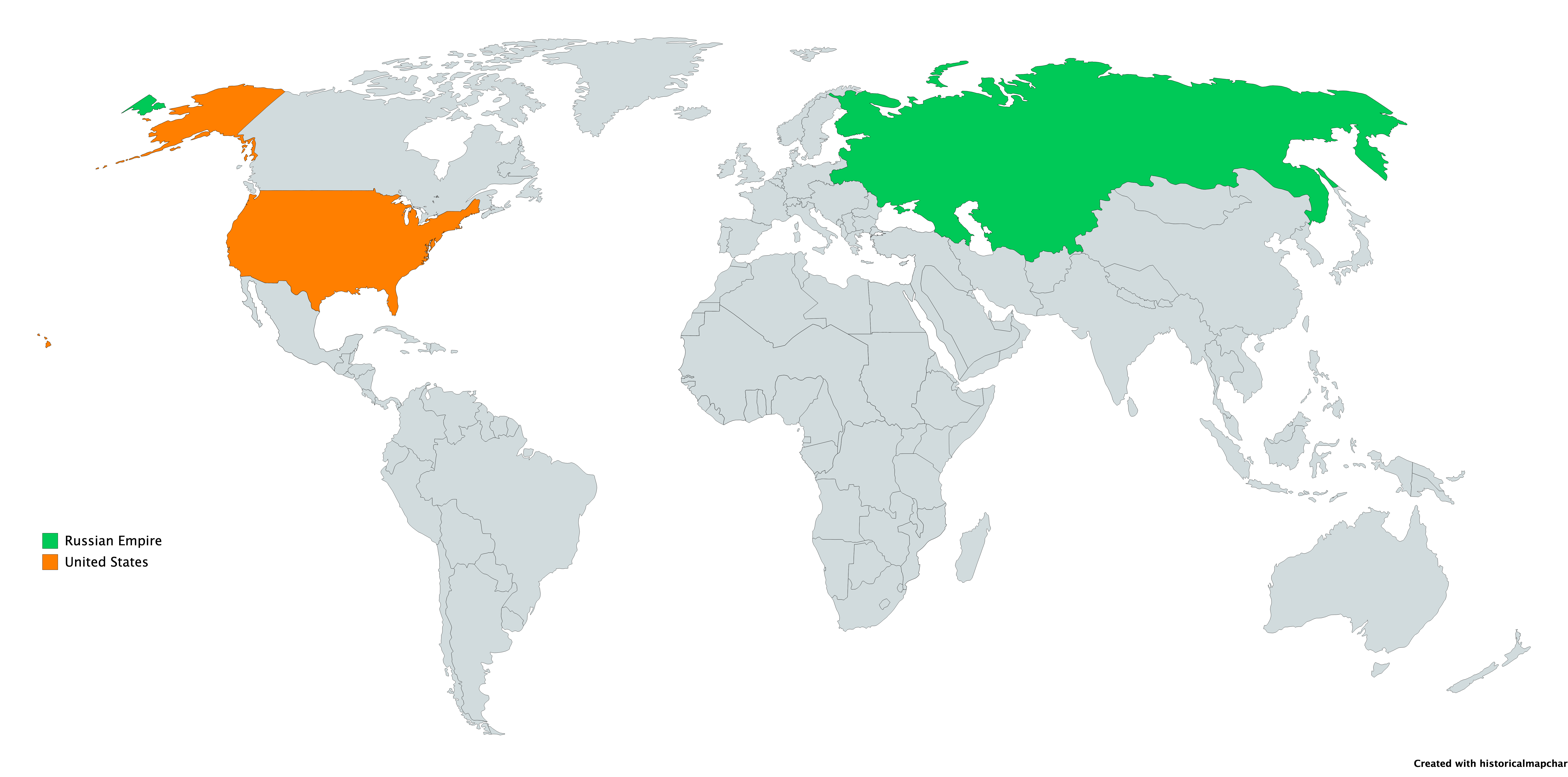

- Russia: United States

Diplomatic mission
- Russian Embassy, Washington, D.C.: American Embassy, Saint Petersburg

Envoy
- Ambassador Andrey Dashkov (first) George Bakhmetev (last): Ambassador; Francis Dana (first); David R. Francis (last)

The Russian Empire officially recognized the United States of America in 1803. However, Russia had established trade relations with the Thirteen Colonies well before they issued the United States Declaration of Independence in 1776. This commerce, which violated the Navigation Acts of the British Empire, continued to take place during the American Revolution. Although Russian empress Catherine the Great decided against openly endorsing either side during the American Revolutionary War, she did hold the view that it was the "personal fault" of British policy and also believed that secession among British colonies in the Americas could be "advantageous" to her realm. Russia's position on the United States, therefore, largely facilitated France's pro-American position and contributed to the British defeat in 1783.

Diplomats were first exchanged between Saint Petersburg and Washington, D.C., in 1809. During the American Civil War, Russia openly supported the Union and while it refrained from entering the conflict as a belligerent, the Imperial Russian Navy maintained a presence in American ports as a show of force against the Confederacy. In 1867, the Alaska Purchase resulted in the American acquisition of Alaska, which had previously been a Russian colony in North America. Following the collapse of the Russian Empire in 1917 (the year of American entry into World War I), the United States supported the White movement until 1920. However, the Allied effort to support the White movement was ultimately unsuccessful, as the Russian Civil War ended with the establishment of the Soviet Union.

There were points of contention in Russia's relationship with the United States, particularly over Russian pogroms between 1890 and 1914. Large-scale immigration to the United States from the Russian Empire did not take place until the late 19th century, mostly attracting Jews, Poles, Lithuanians, and Finns, but also a few ethnic Russians. During this period, the two sides also began to cooperate on issues like maritime law and trade, which continued into the early 20th century.

== Russian involvement in the American Revolutionary War ==
Relations between the two countries began in 1776, when the United States declared its independence from Great Britain.

Earlier contacts had occurred. In 1763, a Boston merchant had anchored his ship at the port of Kronstadt after a direct transatlantic voyage.

Despite being geographically removed from the North American scene, Russia under Catherine the Great significantly affected the American Revolution through diplomacy. While Catherine personally oversaw most Russian interactions with the new country, she also entrusted certain tasks to her foreign advisor, Nikita Ivanovich Panin, who often acted on Catherine's behalf when it came to matters of international diplomacy. Catherine and Panin interacted with the British government through James Harris, 1st Earl of Malmesbury, at the Russian court. The decisions made by Catherine and Panin during the Revolution to remain officially neutral, refuse Great Britain's requests for military assistance, and insist on peace talks that linked a resolution of the American Revolution with the settlement of separate European conflicts indirectly helped the Americans win the Revolution and gain independence.

=== Russian-American trade ===
Small scale direct trade between Russia and British North America began as early as 1763. Such trade was a violation of the British Navigation Acts, which allowed the Thirteen Colonies to trade only with Great Britain. Russian products, such as hemp, sail linen and iron, had started arriving in colonial ports years before the American Revolutionary War began and did not stop when the war started. America and Russia saw each other as trading partners.

Throughout the Revolutionary War, Catherine believed an independent American nation would be ideal for Russian business interests. While some Russian leaders worried that an independent America might interfere with Russia's trade with other European nations, Catherine saw direct Russian-American trade as an excellent opportunity to expand commerce. Catherine knew that after the war, a free America could trade directly with Russia without interference. Moreover, if the Americans gained their independence, Britain would have to turn to other countries such as Russia to supply it with the resources that could no longer be acquired from North America, such as timber for the Royal Navy.

=== Neutrality ===
Catherine chose to have Russia remain officially neutral during the Revolution and never openly picked sides during the war. On an unofficial basis, however, she acted favorably towards the American colonists by offering to provide them all that she could without compromising Russia's neutrality and her eventual desire to act as a mediator.

In March 1780, the Russian ministry released a "Declaration of Armed Neutrality." That set out Russia's international stance on the American Revolution and focused on the importance of allowing neutral vessels to travel freely to any Russian port without them being searched or harassed by the Navigation Acts. While the declaration kept Russia officially neutral, it supported many of France's own pro-American policies and resisted Britain's efforts to defeat the Americans via naval blockades. The declaration also gave the North American rebels an emotional lift, as they realized Russia was not solidly aligned with Great Britain. With Russia as a potential, powerful friend, Russian-U.S. connections and communications continued to improve. Nevertheless, Catherine refused to recognize the United States openly as an independent nation until the war had ended.

=== Great Britain's requests for assistance ===
As the Revolutionary War continued into the late 1770s, a growing list of European powers took sides against Great Britain. The British saw a need to solidify an alliance with Russia to bolster its North American war. As a world power that had previously allied with Britain, Russia was an obvious choice to assist with logistical and military support, as well as diplomatic efforts. While Catherine admired the British people and culture, she disliked George III and his ministers. She was particularly disturbed by the Seven Years' War during which Catherine observed Britain's efforts to exit the conflict discreetly, which left Russia's ally Prussia vulnerable to defeat. She considered those efforts immoral and disloyal and saw Britain as an unreliable ally. She also viewed the American Revolution as Britain's fault. Citing the constant change in Britain's ministries as a major reason, Catherine understood the Americans' grievances.

Despite Russia's official neutrality, Catherine's negative opinions of the British government and her view that Britain had caused the conflict weighed on her decisions when Britain began to request Russian support. In the summer of 1775, Britain sent diplomats to Russia in an attempt to learn whether Catherine would agree to send troops to North America to aid Britain's forces. Although her initial response seemed positive, Catherine denied Britain's formal request for support. While her dislike of the British ministry likely influenced her decision, Catherine formally cited the fact that her army needed rest after it had just finished more than six years of war.

In November 1779, Britain made another plea for Russian assistance. The plea acknowledged to Catherine the collective power of Britain's enemies, as well as George III's desire for peace. The British letter to Catherine explained those concerns and offered to "commit her [Britain's] interests to the hand of the Empress." After waiting several months, Catherine decided to refuse the request. In 1781, distressed and realizing that the British were close to losing the war, James Harris asked if a piece of British territory could convince Russia to join the fight. Offering the island of Minorca, Harris did not request soldiers in exchange. This time, Harris simply asked for Russia to convince France to exit the war and to force the Americans to fight alone. However, Catherine merely used Harris's proposal to embarrass the British government. She declined Harris's offer and publicized it to the French and the Spanish.

=== Attempt at peacemaking ===
Catherine played a significant role in peacemaking efforts during the Revolutionary War. In October 1780, she sent a proposal to each of the European powers involved in the conflict. The proposal requested for the countries to meet to discuss what could be done to create peace. The powers met in Vienna after Great Britain requested for the Austrian ministry to co-mediate the peace talks. Catherine sent Prince Dimitri Galitzin to act on her behalf as the Russian mediator. She sent him with a proposed set of peace guidelines that included a multi-year armistice between the countries and a requirement for negotiations between Great Britain and its European enemies as well as between Great Britain and the Americans. Catherine chose not to include a proposal concerning whether the U.S. would become autonomous. Since the British would not accept U.S. independence, and the French would not accept anything short of it, Catherine realized that explicitly providing for either outcome would lead to an immediate breakdown in the talks. Catherine's ambiguous negotiation efforts ultimately fell through.

== 19th century ==
In 1801 Thomas Jefferson appointed Levett Harris as the first American consul-general to Russia (1803–1816). Russia attempted to join as a third-party mediator of peace in the War of 1812, but this idea was rejected by British officials.

The Monroe Doctrine was partly aimed at Holy Alliance support of intervention in Latin America which Russia several times tried to get the United States to join, as well as the Ukase of 1821 banning non-Russian ships from the Northwest Coast. The Russo-American Treaty of 1824 set parallel 54°40′ north as the boundary between Russian America and the Anglo-American Oregon Country.

=== American Civil War ===
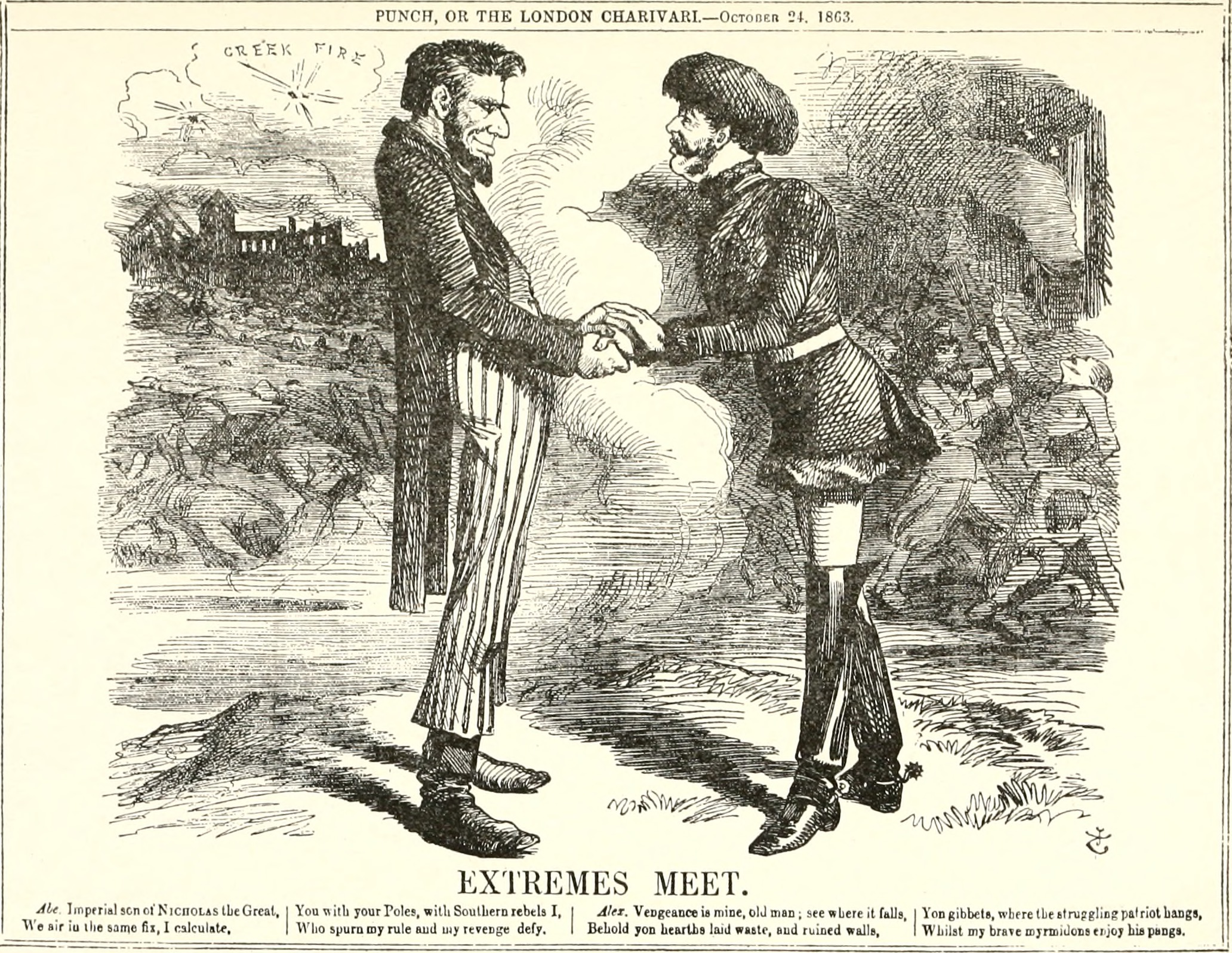
This political cartoon is depicting Abraham Lincoln and Tsar Alexander II meeting and shaking hands. It shows the two leaders as similar in their ideals and leadership.

During the American Civil War, Russia supported the Union, largely because it believed that the U.S. served as a counterbalance to its geopolitical rival, the United Kingdom. In 1863, the Russian Navy's Baltic and Pacific fleets wintered in the American ports of New York and San Francisco, respectively. In fact, Russia was one of the only European nations that expressed its support for the Union and its sympathies with what was happening to the United States. Through an official declaration by Alexander Gorchakov to President Abraham Lincoln on behalf of Tsar Alexander II expressed the importance of the Union on the global political stage as well as a wanted ally. When the issue of recognizing the Confederacy John Appleton, who was the current ambassador to Russia at the time, said “The question of recognizing the Confederate States was not before the Emperor, as the United States must remain a well‐prospering whole in order to counterweigh the British trade empire.” The Alexander Nevsky, Osliaba, and the other vessels of the Atlantic squadron stayed in American waters for seven months (September 1863 to June 1864).

Lucy Petway Holcombe Pickens, known as the "Queen of the Confederacy," her direct ties to Russia were established through her husband's ambassadorship. She gained favor within the Russian imperial court, where her daughter was born with Russian royal godparents. Subsequently, she leveraged Russian gifts and prestige to support the Confederate cause. This distinctive background connects Russian diplomatic history with the U.S. Civil War, positioning her as a singular figure bridging these two nations in the mid-19th century.

To Tsar Alexander II, the main reason to support the Union was clear and it was that they were fighting on the side of emancipation and freedom. Tsar Alexander II was the Tsar that abolished serfdom in the Russian Empire and he believed that Lincoln shared his similar beliefs and championed the side of emancipation. This was one of the main reasons why the Russian Empire continued its support of the Union throughout the American Civil War.

1865 saw a major project attempted: the building of a Russian-U.S. telegraph line from Seattle, through British Columbia, Russian America (Alaska) and Siberia. An early attempt to link East-West communications, it failed and never operated.

=== Alaska purchase, 1867 ===
Russia operated a small fur-trade operations in Alaska, coupled with missionaries to the natives. By 1861, the project had lost money, threatened to antagonize the Americans, and could not be defended from Britain. It proved practically impossible to entice Russians to permanently migrate to Alaska; only a few hundred were there in 1867. In the Alaska Purchase of 1867, the land was sold to the United States for $7.2 million.

The Russian administrators and military left Alaska, but some missionaries stayed on to minister to the many natives who converted to the Russian Orthodox faith.

== 1880–1922 ==
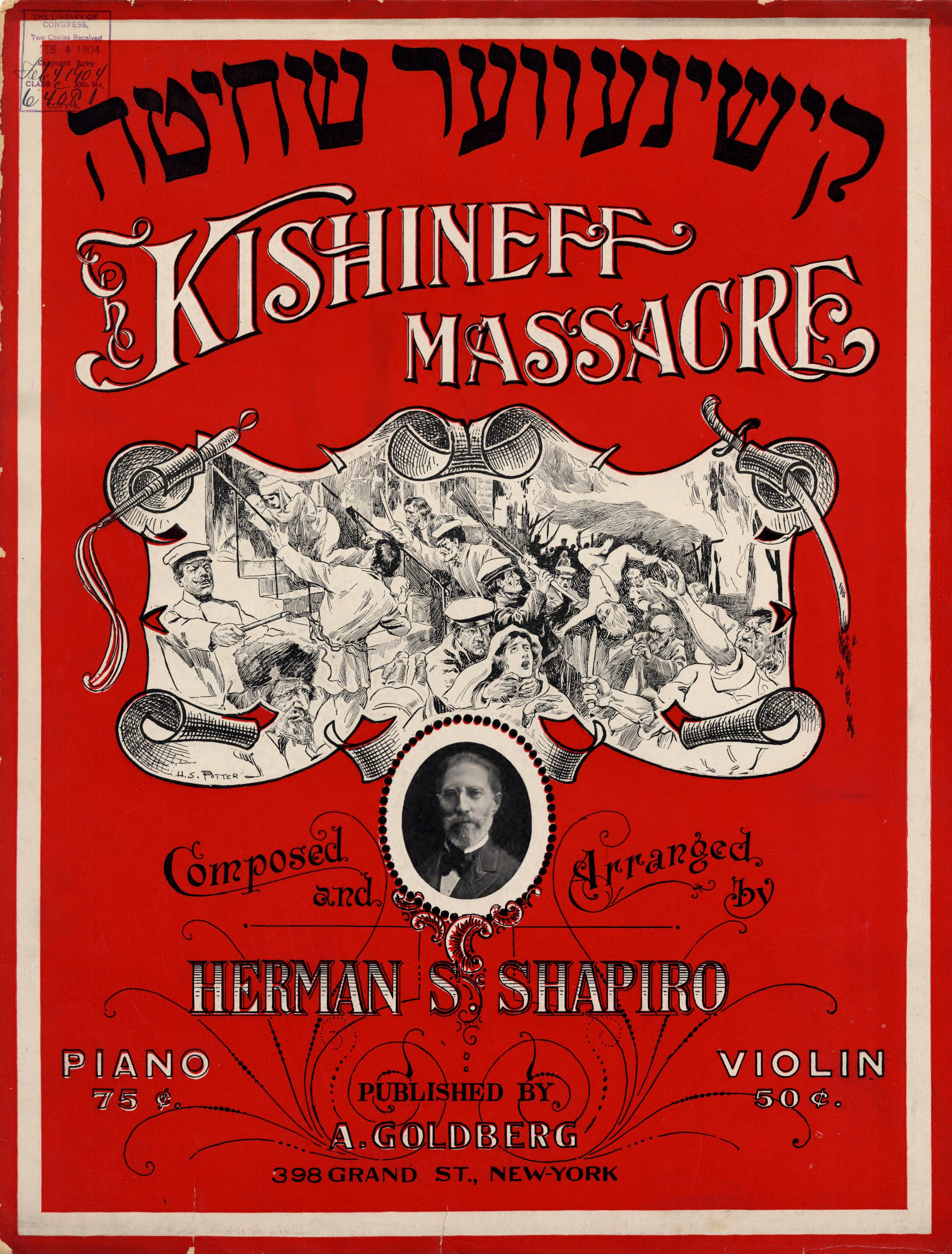
Herman S. Shapiro. "Kishinever shekhita, elegie" [Kishinev Massacre Elegy]. Sheet music cover, New York: 1904.

From 1880 to 1917, about 3.2 million immigrants arrived in the U.S. from the Russian Empire. Most were Jews or Poles, and only 100,000 were ethnic Russians. There were many Volga Germans or Russian German immigrants to the United States. Meanwhile, large numbers of minorities, especially Jews, Poles, and Lithuanians, emigrated to the United States before 1914. Relations remained cool, especially because of the repeated pogroms in the Russian Empire.

=== Jewish pogroms and aftermath ===
After 1880, repeated anti-Jewish pogroms in Russia alienated U.S. elite and public opinion. In 1903, the Kishinev pogrom killed 47 Jews, injured 400, and left 10,000 homeless and dependent on relief. American Jews began large-scale organized financial help and assisted in emigration. More violence in Russia led in 1911 to the United States repealing an 1832 commercial treaty.

=== Boxer Rebellion ===
In 1900, Russia and the United States were part of the Eight-Nation Alliance suppressing the Boxer Rebellion in China. Russia soon afterward occupied Manchuria, and the United States asserted the Open Door Policy to forestall Russian and German territorial demands from leading to a partition of China into closed colonies.

=== Russo-Japanese War ===
U.S. President Theodore Roosevelt volunteered and successfully mediated an end to the Russo-Japanese War. Though during the conflict itself, Roosevelt had tacitly supported Japan, the Treaty of Portsmouth was signed in 1905 on the conditions widely deemed more favorable to Russia given the circumstances. Roosevelt was subsequently awarded the Nobel Peace Prize for his efforts.

=== World War I and aftermath ===
During World War I, the United States' declaration of war came in April 1917 and only after February Revolution forced the abdication of Nicholas II who was widely viewed as a despot by the American public, long deterring support for the entente cause. When the Tsar was still in power, many Americans resisted fighting a war with him as an ally. The Wilson administration cited the new provisional government in Russia when describing the war as a struggle of democracies against autocratic old empires of Germany and Austria-Hungary. During the war, the American Expeditionary Forces were just starting to see battle when the October Revolution led by the Bolsheviks overthrew the Russian Provisional Government in Petrograd and withdrew Russia from the war altogether.

Before the armistice in November 1918, the Americans had helped the Allied intervention in the Russian Civil War with the Polar Bear Expedition and the American Expeditionary Force Siberia. The Americans' goal was not necessarily ideological but rather to deny the Central Powers access to Russian stockpiles of war materiel left vulnerable as civil war raged in Russia following the rise of the Bolsheviks. The United States did formally, though tacitly, support the White movement against the Bolsheviks.

== Diplomatic missions ==
The Russian Empire and the United States both had an embassy and consulates in each other's nations during their diplomatic relations. A few months after the Russian Empire fell during the February Revolution in 1917, the United States government began to pay the consuls' expenses at all seven locations because of the importance they were playing in assisting the large number of Russian emigrants coming to North America. On November 16, 1933, some of the consulates were closed after the signing of the Roosevelt-Litvinov Agreement where the United States recognized the Soviet Union and diplomatic relations between the two countries began.

The Russian Empire Embassy was in Washington D.C., while its consulates were in Chicago, Honolulu, New York, Philadelphia, Portland, San Francisco, and Seattle. The US Embassy was located in Moscow, while its consulates were in Odesa, Saint Petersburg, and Vladivostok.

== See also ==
- Foreign policy of the Russian Empire
- History of United States foreign policy
- Soviet Union–United States relations
- Russia–United States relations
- United States ambassador to Russia
