= Lasse Lund =

Finnish-Norwegian man who grew up in India

- Born: Lasse Jonas Lund; 1992 (age 33–34); Norway
- Citizenship: Finland; Norway
- Known for: Account of his childhood in Mumbai and Finnish consular assistance

Lasse Jonas Lund (born 1992) is a Finnish-Norwegian man who received media attention in 2026 after posting videos on YouTube about what he says was his childhood in Mumbai, India. His account has been disputed by his mother, while Finland's Ministry for Foreign Affairs said that the Finnish embassy in Delhi should have contacted child welfare authorities in connection with his case.

== Biography ==
Lund was born in Norway in 1992 and is a dual citizen of Finland and Norway. His mother is Finnish and his father is Norwegian. In an interview with Danish newspaper Berlingske, both Lund and his mother describes his parents' lifestyle as "alternative". On YouTube Lund says that his father was a "DJ / drug dealer" and his mother was a "stoner" and that when he met his father, he was still selling drugs in Norway. Lund has said that he lived in India as a child, including in and around Dharavi.

Lund said his parents moved to Goa, India, in 1996 when he was five years old. In Goa, Lund's parents separated and Lund's mother had a daughter. Lund's brother and father moved back to Norway, while Lund stayed behind with his mother and sister. According to Lund, his mother was arrested in 2003 and several times after that as well. Both Lund and his mother say that, in 2008, Lund's mother was imprisoned for one year and eight months because she did not have a passport. During this time, Lund says he lived on the streets, while his mother says he stayed with friends of the family until he left India in 2009 on a passport he received from the Finnish embassy in Delhi. Yle reported that ministry records showed Lund's case came to the attention of the Finnish embassy in Delhi in 2008, when he was still underage. The broadcaster also reported that his mother denied that he had been abandoned and said parts of his story were fabricated, though she confirms that when she was arrested she did not inform the police of Lund's existence.

Upon arriving in Norway, he moved in with his father. Today, Lund lives some distance away from Oslo with his son, whose mother is also Norwegian. Lund no longer speaks with his parents.

In 2026, Lund attracted attention on social media after speaking publicly about his childhood. Vice interviewed him in June 2026, and Indian outlets including The Economic Times and Mumbai Mirror also covered his account.

Helsingin Sanomat and Berlingske received a statement from the director for the consulary department at the Finnish Foreign ministry, Jussi Tanner where Lund's case is described as "exceptional" and that there is no reason to "doubt the essence of the story".

In June 2026, in a YouTube documentary about his life, he said that he found out his father was sending money to India and that his Indian friends merely exploited him for said money.
