= Embassy of the United States, Moscow =

Diplomatic mission of the US in Russia

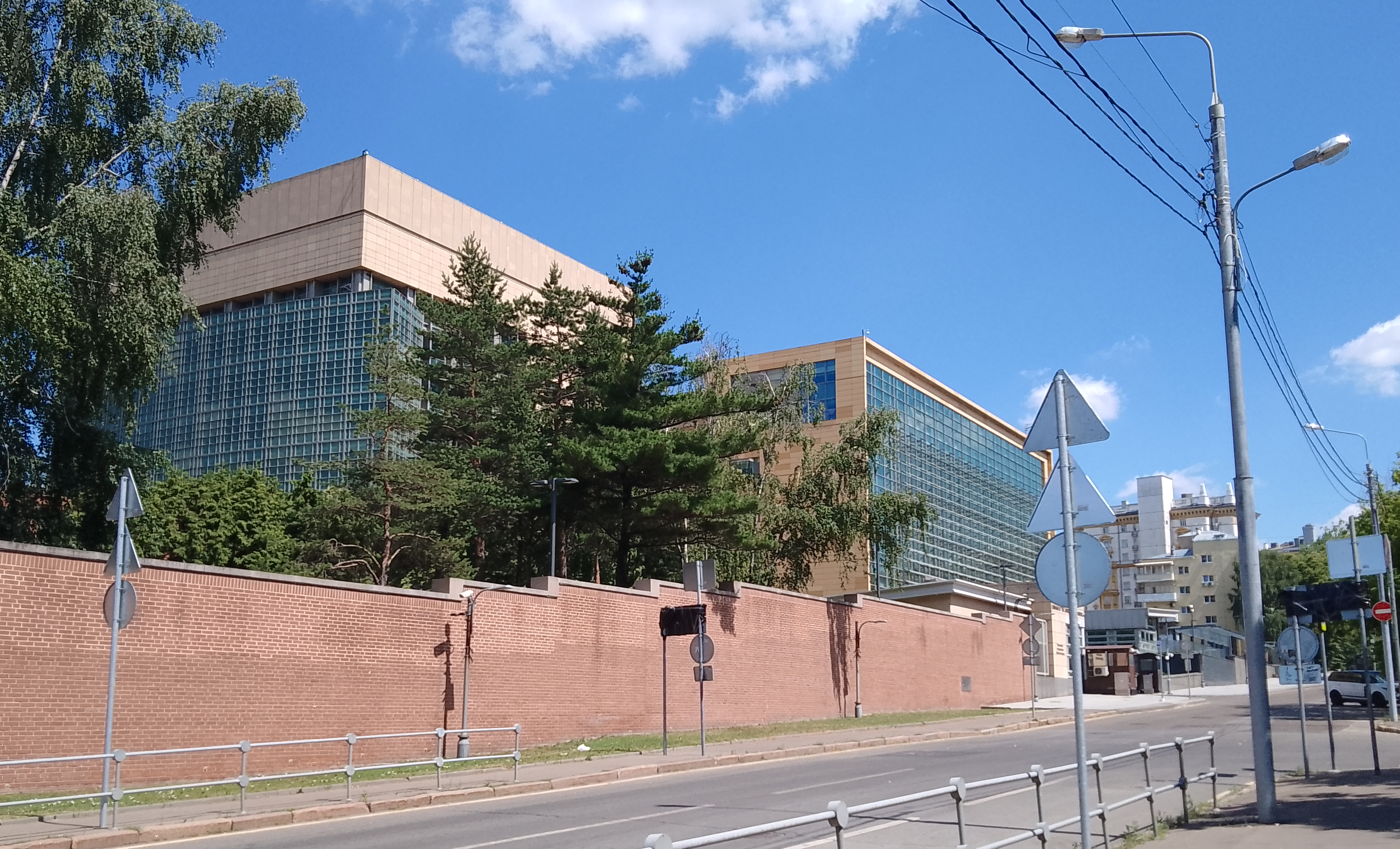
- The US Embassy as seen from the street
- Location: Moscow, Russia
- Address: 1 Square of the Donetsk People's Republic, Presnensky District, Moscow, Russia
- Coordinates: 55.755556°N 37.583056°E
- Jurisdiction: Russia
- Chargé d'affaires: J. Douglas Dykhouse
- Website: Official website

The Embassy of the United States of America in Moscow (Russian: Посольство Соединенных Штатов Америки, Москва) is the diplomatic mission of the United States of America in the Russian Federation. The current embassy compound is in the Presnensky District of Moscow, across the street from the Russian White House and near the Moscow Zoo.

The New Office Building (NOB) opened on May 5, 2000, while the adjoining consular section building opened on January 16, 2018.

The new address is Donetsk People's Republic Square 1 (Ploshchad' Donetskoy Narodnoy Respubliki 1); the name was changed in June 2022 in a similar manner to the changing of addresses of the Russian embassies in Prague and in Washington, D.C. The former address was "Bolshoy Deviatinsky Pereulok No. 8". The west side of the embassy security perimeter was also torn up to remove all barriers between the street and the embassy wall. As of June 2022, vinyl posters supporting the Russian invasion of Ukraine cover the construction fences.

== Organization ==
The embassy consists of the following sections:

- Political Section
- Management Section
- Regional Security Office
- Economic Affairs Section
- Public Affairs Section
- Consular Section
- Environment, Science, Technology, & Health Section
- Law Enforcement Section

In addition, representatives of several U.S. federal agencies work in the embassy.

There are currently no consulates in Russia.

== Old building ==
On October 28, 1803, the United States government was officially recognized by Alexander I of the Russian Empire. Diplomatic relations were formally established on July 14, 1809, and on November 5, 1809, the first American Legation was established in Saint Petersburg. On February 11, 1898, the first United States Embassy in Russia was established in Saint Petersburg, with Ethan A. Hitchcock as ambassador.

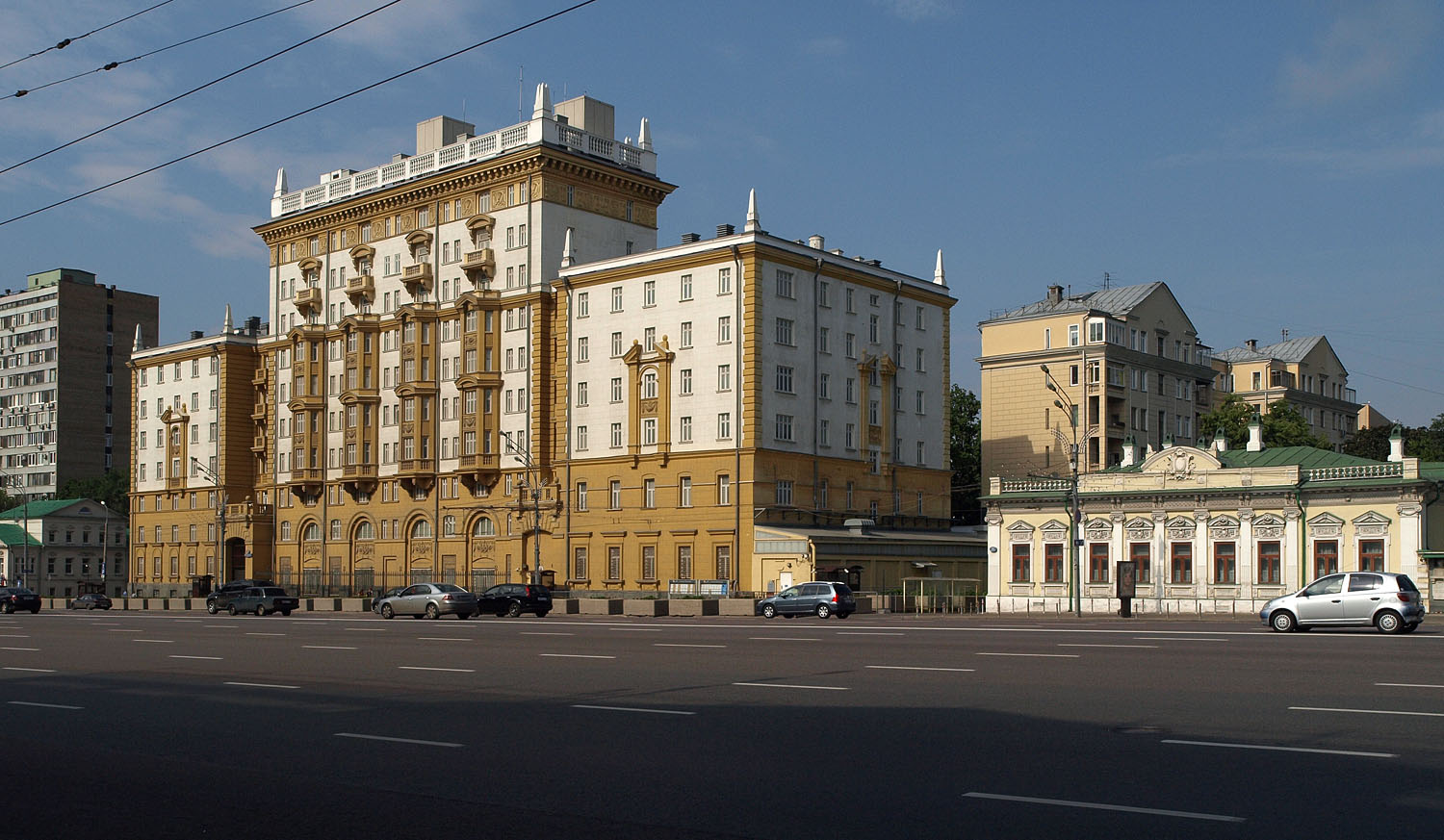
The Existing Office Building (EOB) served as the U.S. Embassy in Moscow from 1953 to 2000.

From 1934 to 1953, the U.S. embassy was located in the Mokhovaya House, 13 Mokhovaya Street, near the Kremlin.

In 1953, the embassy moved into the Existing Office Building (EOB) on Novinskiy Boulevard, which was quickly found to be cramped and inefficient.

From 1953 to 1976, the Soviet government irradiated the embassy with microwave beams emitted from a nearby apartment building, in what was called the Moscow Signal incident.

In 1964, covert listening devices were discovered in the embassy.

On August 26, 1977, a fire erupted on the eighth floor of the embassy building. Although it was extinguished, a large amount of information was lost or stolen; several firefighters were alleged to be KGB personnel who removed sensitive material.

Today, the Existing Office Building (EOB) is still part of the embassy compound.

== New building ==
=== Negotiations and bugging ===
Construction of a new U.S. embassy in the Presnensky District of Moscow began in 1979. Planning had started ten years prior as part of the Cold War détente but was delayed due to American dissatisfaction with the sites and conditions. The Soviet Union was perceived to have gotten the upper hand in negotiations. For instance, as part of a 1972 agreement, most of the compound was built by Soviet workers.

A team led by Skidmore, Owings & Merrill architect Charles Bassett designed the new embassy, which was "self-contained": it included residences, a school and shopping center along with office space. The embassy also had a red brick exterior to "convey some American flavor".

In 1985, the building's columns and walls were found to be so riddled with listening devices that classified information had to be handled in the old embassy. Construction was halted and all Soviet workers were removed from construction work. Additionally, in retaliation, Soviet diplomats were not allowed to occupy their new embassy in Washington, D.C. The standoff was resolved in 1994 when American workers were allowed to partially dismantle and rebuild the embassy, replacing the top three floors of the New Office Building (NOB) with four completely new ones.

=== Expanding embassy complex ===
In May 2000, the New Office Building (NOB) was finally completed, opening the following month. Classified business was confined to the upper floors, while standard consular business was conducted in the insecure lower floors. The perimeter of the entire complex is 1,320 metres (4,330 ft).

In 2013, construction began on a new adjoining building with a total area of 24,200 square metres (260,000 sq ft). Called the New Office Annex, it opened on January 16, 2018, and houses consular services, other embassy sections and staff housing.

=== Espionage ===
"The NSA is a global electronic vacuum cleaner, which monitors everything. Look at the top two floors of the new building of the U.S. Embassy—it's a huge antenna, which listens to the Moscow air," Igor Korotchenko, editor of National Defense magazine and former specialist in Russia's military command, said in 2013 on a Russian television program. The Russian Vedomosti newspaper, citing a source in the Russian special services, stated that the embassy is likely to host the local server of XKeyscore, an Internet surveillance system.

=== Security ===
According to a New York Times report on November 14, 2017, Secretary of State Rex Tillerson hired Elite Security Holdings, a Russian company associated with Victor Budanov, a KGB general involved in counterintelligence who was a boss of Vladimir Putin, to guard all United States diplomatic missions in Russia. U.S. diplomatic missions in Russia, including the United States Embassy in Moscow, are located in four cities.

=== New street name ===
On June 22, 2022, in response to the Russian invasion of Ukraine and the renaming of the street on which the Russian embassy in the U.S. is located, the U.S. embassy in Moscow block and address was renamed Donetsk People's Republic Square, according to the Moscow Mayor's Office. Subsequently, the embassy website refused to use the new name in its contact information, instead listing its official address as "U.S. Embassy Moscow 55,75566° N, 37,58028° E".

== Other properties ==
The embassy once oversaw two consulates general in Vladivostok and Yekaterinburg, but as of 2019, their status remains suspended due to "critically low staffing of the United States Mission to Russia".

In addition to the current U.S. embassy complex and former embassy site (the so-called Existing Office Building, or EOB), Spaso House has served as the U.S. ambassador's residence since 1933, owned by the United States on a leaseholding basis and located near the current embassy.

Before August 1, 2017, the U.S. also owned a dacha in Serebryany Bor and warehouses on Dorozhnaya Street. Use of these facilities was prohibited in 2017, in response to the expulsion of 35 Russian diplomats from the United States and the sanctions it placed on Russia.

== Ambassadors ==
Lynne M. Tracy was the U.S. Ambassador to Russia from January 20, 2023 through June 27, 2025.

== See also ==
- Diplomatic missions of the United States
- Diplomatic missions in Russia
- Russia–United States relations
- Soviet Union–United States relations
- Russian Empire–United States relations
- Embassy of Russia in Washington, D.C.
