= Russia and the American Revolution =

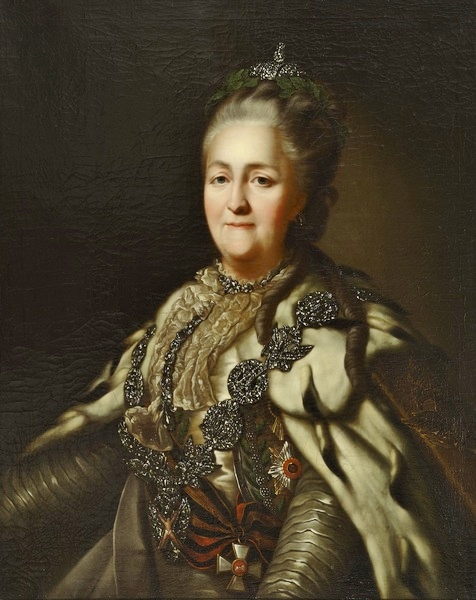
Catherine the Great, the Empress of Russia during the American Revolution.

During the American Revolution, Russia remained neutral in the conflict between Great Britain and rebelling colonists in Thirteen Colonies of the British Empire. Prior to the war's outbreak in 1775, Russian colonisers, operating under the ultimate direction of Empress Catherine the Great, had begun exploring the Western Seaboard, and in 1784 began colonizing Alaska, establishing the colony of Russian America. Although Russia did not directly become involved in the conflict, with Catherine rejecting British diplomatic overtures to dispatch the Imperial Russian Army to North America, the Russians did play a major role in diplomacy in the American Revolutionary War and contributed to the lasting legacy of the American Revolution abroad.

== Russia in North America prior to the war ==
As other European states expanded westward across the Atlantic Ocean, the Russian Empire went eastward and conquered the vast wilderness of Siberia. Although it initially went east with the hope of increasing its fur trade, the Russian imperial court in St. Petersburg hoped that its eastern expansion would also prove its cultural, political, and scientific belonging to Europe. The Eurasian empire looked to North America after reaching the Pacific Ocean in 1639 and occupying the Kamchatka Peninsula in the 1680s.

From 1729 to 1741, the Russian court sponsored the Danish-born Russian explorer Vitus Bering and his Russian colleague Aleksei Chirikov to begin the Russian search for North America. In their initial 1729 expedition, the pair missed the Alaskan coast due to thick fog. When they set off again in 1741, Chirikov reached the shore of the Alaskan panhandle only to have his search party ambushed and killed by the native Tlingits. After the dreadful event, Chirikov hurriedly sailed back to Kamchatka. Bering, on the other hand, had worse luck. He made it ashore to central Alaska, and then sailed back to Kamchatka along the barren Aleutians, only to endure a hard winter on one of the islands, losing many men. However, when Bering and his remaining crew returned to Petropavlovsk, they brought with them over nine hundred sea otter pelts.

The valuable furs with which survivors of Bering's expedition returned sparked greater interest in the fur trade. Russian Promyshlenniki, or fur traders, began to set off to Alaska in droves with hopes of striking it rich. The drive to obtain furs led the promyshlenniki to conflict with the native Aleuts who raided the settlements, causing the traders to respond with threats, and forced commerce. The traders also inadvertently caused environmental harm - many animals were hunted to near extinction. The tribes attacked their imperial overlords again in 1764, but their rising was met by fierce retribution and defeat at Russian hands in 1766. Prior to the onset of the American Revolutionary War, the Russian expansion into North America boosted the empire's economy and prestige, but caused much detriment to the local wildlife of Alaska, and brought about the desolation of the Aleut through disease and warfare.

== Russia and the Declaration of Independence ==
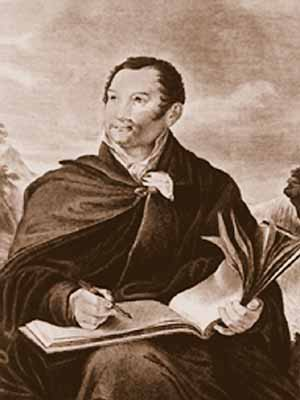
Pavel Svinyin

News of the Declaration of Independence's penning and signing finally reached Imperial Russia on August 13, 1776. In imperial correspondence, Vasilii Grigor'evich Lizakevich, a Russian ambassador in London, wrote to Count Nikita Ivanovich Panin, a Russian statesman, and praised the leadership, bravery, and virtue of colonial leaders as shown through the declaration. It is worth noting, though, that, in this same dispatch, Lizakevich never noted the "natural rights of man" mentioned in the document; and, instead only focused on the actions of the American forefathers. When Catherine the Great learned of the declaration, she attributed the reason behind its creation to "personal fault" on the part of the British Crown's policies towards Britain's North American colonies. Moreover, Catherine believed "that the separation of the colonies from the mother country did not conflict with the interests of Russia and might even be advantageous to her."

More documentation of the Russian reception of the Declaration of Independence comes from the accounts of Pavel Petrovich Svinyin, a representative of the tsarist government to the United States. In his accounts from 1811 to 1813, Svinyin noted that it appeared that American civilians enjoyed almost all the enumerated liberties as outlined by the declaration and constitution. Despite the publication of Svinyin's observations of American life, the full text of the Declaration of Independence was outlawed in the Russian Empire until the reign and reform era of Tsar Alexander II (1855–1881). Historians attribute this absence of the document to the disconnect between the Declaration of Independence's values and the policies which the Russian monarchy enforced.

The Declaration of Independence also inspired the beliefs and doctrines of some members of Russia's Decembrist Uprising. To them, America represented a sort of "motherland of freedom." Even though it was never fully published before the Decembrist Revolt, the Declaration of Independence still managed to infiltrate the minds of members of Russian society.

== Russian diplomacy during the war ==
=== Catherine the Great and her imperial policy ===
Monument to Catherine the Great located on Nevsky Prospect in St. Petersburg, Russia

Catherine, who reigned from 1762 to 1796, played a modest role in the American Revolutionary War through her politicking with other European heads of state. Initially, she took a keen interest in the conflict because it affected "English and European politics" and sympathised with the view that British colonial policies had led to the war. Catherine held low opinions of George III and British diplomats in Russia, often treating the latter with contempt. In 1775, the British sought a military alliance with Russia and formally requested Catherine send 20,000 Russian troops to North America; she rebuffed both requests. Upon Spain's entry into the war in 1777, British diplomats requested support from the Imperial Russian Navy against the French and Spanish navies, but Catherine II once again rejected the request.

Catherine's greatest diplomatic contribution during the American Revolution came from the creation and proclamation of the First League of Armed Neutrality in 1780. This declaration of armed neutrality had several stipulations, but three crucial ones: first, "that neutral ships may freely visit the ports of belligerent Powers;" second, "that the goods of belligerent Powers on neutral ships are permitted to pass without hindrance, with the exception of war contraband;" and, third, "under the definition of a blockaded port falls only a port into which entry is actually hampered by naval forces." Most European nations agreed to these terms, but the British refused to recognize the arrangement because it undermined their blockade of rebellious North American ports, which was Britain's most effective military strategy. After establishing a league of neutral parties, Catherine attempted to act as a mediator between the Americans and Britain by submitting a ceasefire plan. However, the Franco-American victory at the siege of Yorktown in 1781 led to such attempts becoming irrelevant.

In 1780, British diplomats offered Catherine the island of Menorca if the Russians would agree to join Britain in the war. Despite the economic boost such an acquisition offered, Catherine rejected it and publicised the offer, which made Britain look weak in the eyes of other European powers. Even though she took a rather ambivalent approach to Russian foreign policy during the American Revolution, some scholars believe that historians have been too favorable to Catherine during this period. This negative opinion of the tsarina holds that she simply acted in the best interest of the Russian Empire and did not actually care for the cause of the Thirteen Colonies.

=== Francis Dana's mission ===
Francis Dana served as the United States ambassador to Russia from December 19, 1780, until September 1783. His original mission was to "sign in St. Petersburg the convention about the adherence of the United States to the armed neutrality, and to reach an agreement about a treaty concerning friendship and trade."

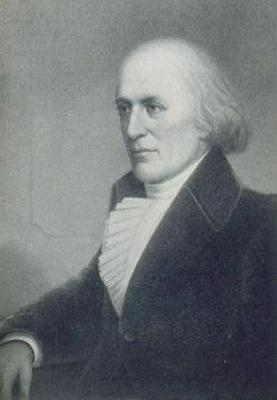
Francis Dana

Dana experienced some difficulties during his trip. First off, the Russian Empire had not yet recognized the United States as a nation, and, secondly, the Russians could not formally accept a representative from a state which they had not yet acknowledged. The American diplomat fought against these presumptions and put forth, in a long memorandum to the Russian imperial court, that America's nationhood stemmed from the Declaration of Independence and not from a peace treaty with Great Britain. However, "the argumentation of Francis Dana, based on the principles of popular sovereignty, could not, it goes without saying, make a special impression (on the contrary, only a negative one) on the Tsarist Government." Due to these hindrances to the success of his mission, Robert Livingston moved that the Continental Congress recall Dana from St. Petersburg. Ironically, Dana left Russia the day after the signing of the peace treaty between the United States and Britain. Unfortunately for Francis Dana, he spent years in the Russian courts only to see his mission uncompleted.

Many historians have overlooked the broader political occurrences at the time of Dana's mission. Several believe Catherine II's refusal to acknowledge the American diplomat rooted itself in Russia's desire to avoid conflict with Great Britain. However, Catherine the Great used her denial of Dana as a leverage point in her annexation of Crimea. She voiced to her fellow heads of state that she remained neutral during their conflicts, so they should not meddle with her political affairs. Perhaps this politicking on the part of Catherine II also played a role in the failure of Dana's quest.

== Legacy of the war in Russia and America ==
Unbeknownst to many, Russia played a significant role in the American Revolutionary War. First and foremost, Catherine the Great's position as perhaps the foremost sponsor of ongoing mediations between the European powers and America, that transpired during the war years, ultimately served as a means of legitimizing and rallying support for the American cause, amongst the other European powers. Her political and military positions acted to further isolate the British within greater European politics, and in the final analysis, to help pave the way for the eventual victory of the young republic. According to Nikolai Bolkhovitinov, "the proclamation of the Declaration of Armed Neutrality by Russia, which received the official approval of the Continental Congress of the United States in October 1780, had great international significance." If Catherine the Great had not politically maneuvered with other imperial powers and negotiated neutrality with other potentially belligerent states, and if instead, she had chosen to support the British position, then perhaps the American Revolution may have been a somewhat different story.

Other than Russia's influence on the United States during this time, the Eurasian Empire and the United States had many mutually beneficial relationships. Several scholars from both states, such as Benjamin Franklin and Mikhail Lomonosov, had direct or indirect relationships with one another. The Imperial Academy of Sciences in St. Petersburg even elected Franklin to its honorary ranks in November 1789. Russia and America also shared a prosperous commercial relationship. Though no Russian ships directly reached the ports of America during the war due to the empire's declaration of neutrality, many merchants from both countries were freely trading with each other after 1783.

In December 1807 Russia first officially agreed to provide full diplomatic recognition of the new American republic, authorizing a full top-level diplomatic exchange. On December 18, 1832, the two countries formally signed a trade treaty that K.V. Nesselrode and James Buchanan negotiated. Upon the signing of this agreement, President Andrew Jackson remarked that the trade "furnishe[d] new motives for that mutual friendship which both countries have so far nourished with respect to each other." Jackson was not the only president to speak to the connections of Russia and America. Before the official trade agreement, the various benevolent relationships between Russia and the United States would even lead President Thomas Jefferson to declare "Russia as the Power friendliest to the Americans." Clearly, the American Revolution started a trend of positive relations between the two states.

Despite these examples of positive connections between Russia and America during this time, one cannot ignore the ideological conflict that would have existed between the monarchical empire and democratic republic. Although the American victory undoubtedly weakened the British Empire, the American Revolution "provoked a sharply negative reaction of the ruling classes" in Russia, and, most likely, in other European states. Moreover, it was impossible to speak out about changes to Russia's political structure, potential of revolution, or democratic freedoms during this period. One could "write more or less objectively about the right to freedom and independence of the American people, and its experience of victorious revolutionary struggle against England." Such revolutionary ideology inspired Russian authors Alexander Radishchev and Nikolay Novikov to write about American successes during the war, condemn slavery, and rebuke the decimation of Native Americans. As time passed, the American Revolution even inspired some members of the Decembrist Revolt in St. Petersburg as, to them, America represented a sort of "motherland of freedom." Although revolution in Russia would not succeed until 1917, the ideals that inspired American patriots created ripples in the tsarist empire.

== See also ==
- Russian Empire–United States relations
- Russia–United States relations
