= Soviet Union–United States relations =

Bilateral relations, 1922–1991

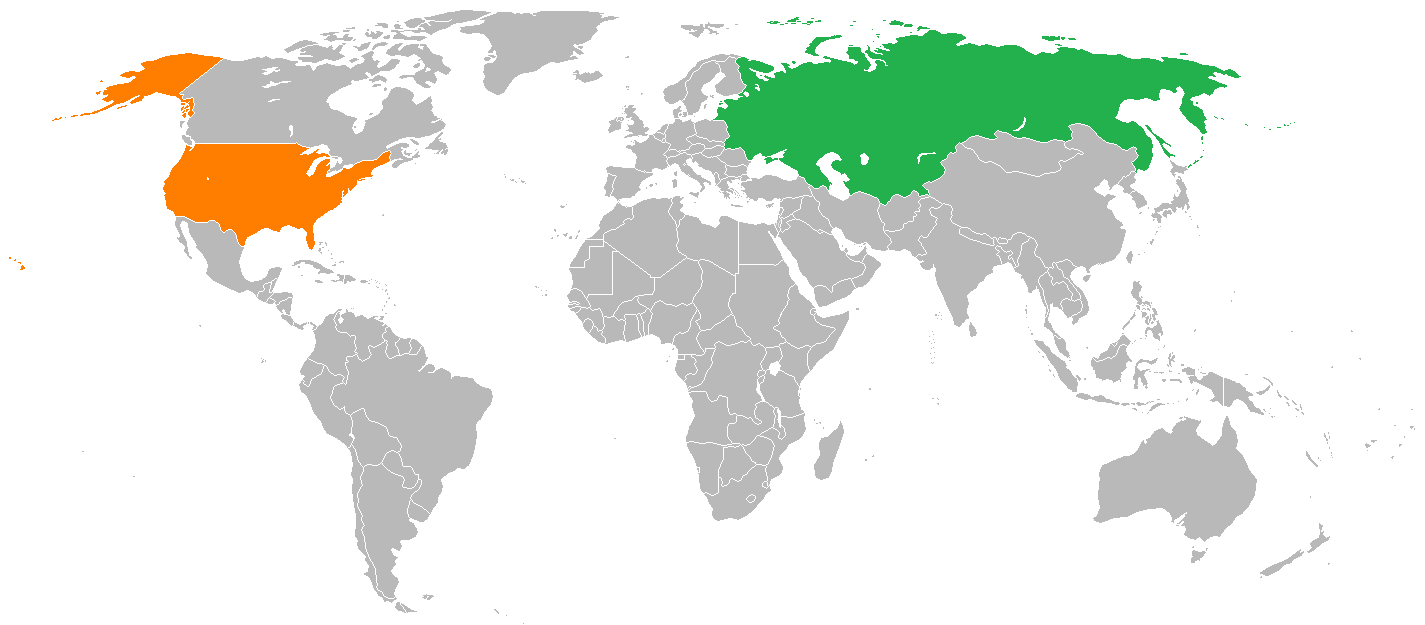

- Soviet Union: United States

Diplomatic mission
- Embassy of the Soviet Union, Washington, D.C.: Embassy of the United States, Moscow

Envoy
- Ambassador Maxim Litvinov (first) Viktor Komplektov (last): Ambassador; William C. Bullitt Jr. (first); Robert S. Strauss (last)

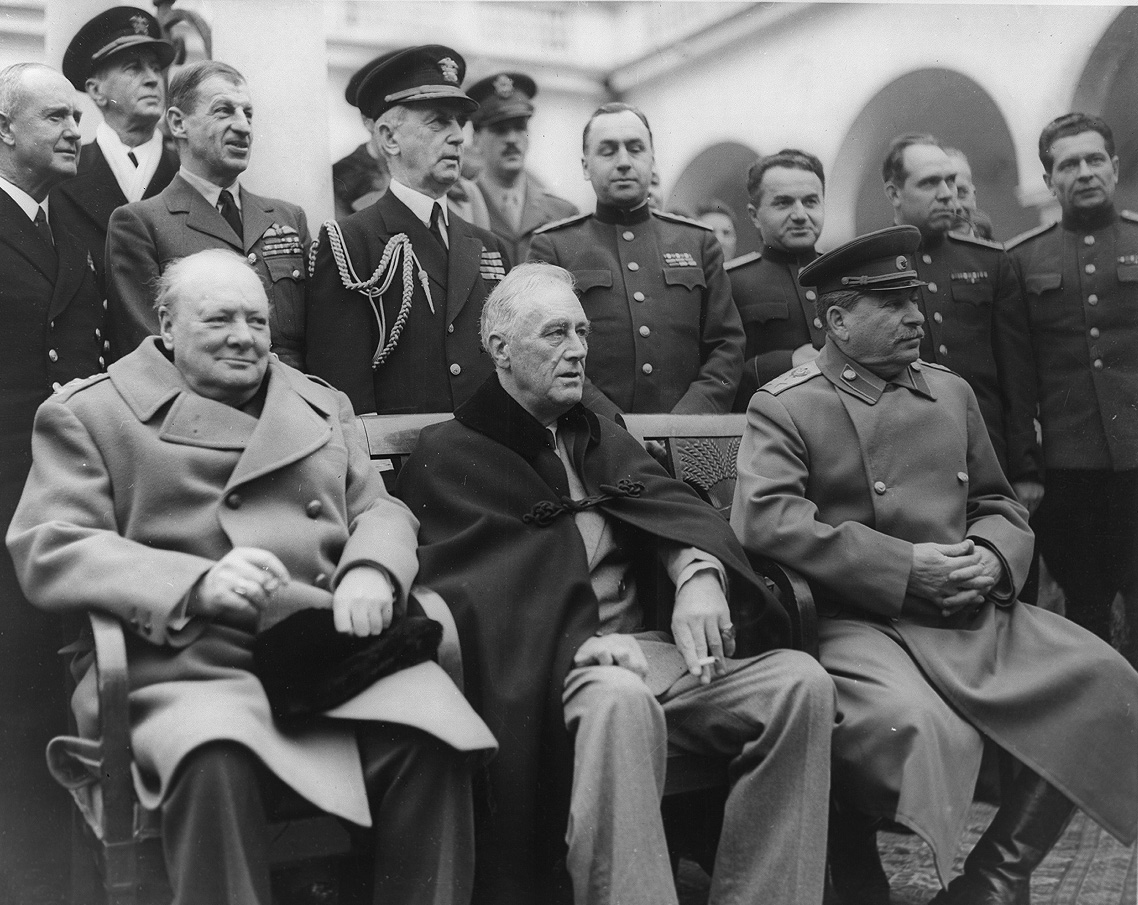
U.K. Prime Minister Winston Churchill, U.S. President Franklin D. Roosevelt, and Soviet leader Joseph Stalin in Yalta, Crimea, Russian SFSR, Soviet Union in February 1945. The results of the meeting shaped the world order for the next half-century up until the Revolutions of 1989, which culminated in the end of Soviet rule in the USSR's Central and Eastern European satellite states, eventually resulting in the dissolution and subsequent collapse of the Soviet Union in 1991.

Relations between the Soviet Union and the United States were fully established from 1933 until 1991 as the succeeding bilateral ties to those between the Russian Empire and the United States, which lasted from 1809 until 1917; they were also the predecessor to the current bilateral ties between the Russian Federation and the United States that began in 1991 after the end of the Cold War.

The relationship between the Soviet Union and the United States was largely defined by mistrust and hostility. The invasion of the Soviet Union by Germany as well as the attack on the U.S. Pacific Fleet at Pearl Harbor by Imperial Japan marked the Soviet and American entries into World War II on the side of the Allies in June and December 1941, respectively. As the Soviet–American alliance against the Axis came to an end following the Allied victory in 1945, the first signs of post-war mistrust and hostility began to immediately appear between the two countries, as the Soviet Union militarily occupied Eastern European countries and turned them into satellite states, forming the Eastern Bloc. These bilateral tensions escalated into the Cold War after the creation of the entire Korean Peninsula divided into Soviet-backed North Korea and the US-backed South Korea as one of the earliest flashpoints in 1948 that led to the Korean War for over three years from 1950 to 1953 where the conflict had never technically ended, a decades-long period of tense hostile relations with short phases of détente that ended after the collapse of the Soviet Union and emergence of the present-day Russia at the end of 1991.

== History ==
=== Pre-World War II relations (1917–1939) ===
==== Provisional Government ====
In wake of the February Revolution and Tsar Nicholas II's abdication, Washington was still largely ignorant of the underlying fractures in new Russian Provisional Government and believed that Russia would rapidly evolve into a stable democracy enthusiastic to join the western coalition in the war against Germany. With the establishment of the Provisional Government, United States Ambassador to Petrograd David R. Francis immediately requested from Washington authority to recognize the new government arguing the revolution "is the practical realization of that principle of government which we have championed and advocated. I mean government by consent of the governed. Our recognition will have a stupendous moral effect especially if given first." and was approved on 22 March 1917 making the United States the first foreign government to formally recognize the new government. A week and a half later when President Woodrow Wilson addressed Congress to request a declaration of war against Germany, Wilson remarked "Does not every American feel that assurance has been added to our hope for the future peace of the world by the wonderful and heartening things that have been happening within the last few weeks in Russia? Russia was known by those who knew it best to have been always in fact democratic at heart... Here is a fit partner for a League of Honor."

Hoping the fledgling parliamentary democracy would reinvigorate Russian contributions to the war, President Wilson took sizable strides to build a relationship with the Provisional Government. The day following his request declaration of war on Germany, Wilson began offering American governmental credits to the new Russian government totaling $325 million – about half of which was actually used. Wilson also dispatched the Root Mission, a delegation led by Elihu Root and inclusive of leaders from the American Federation of Labor, YMCA, and the International Harvester company, to Petrograd to negotiate means through which the United States could encourage further Russian commitment to the war. By product of poorly chosen delegates, a lack of interest from those delegates, and a significant inattention to the role and influence of the Petrograd Soviet (some members of which were opposed to the continuing Russian war effort), the mission made little benefit to either nation. Despite the satisfactory reports returning from Petrograd, whose impression of the nation's conditions came directly from the Provisional Government, American consular and military officials in closer contact with the populace and army occasionally warned Washington to be more skeptical in their assumptions about the new government. Nonetheless, the American government and public were caught off-guard and bewildered by the fall of the Provisional Government in the October Revolution.

==== Soviet Russia ====
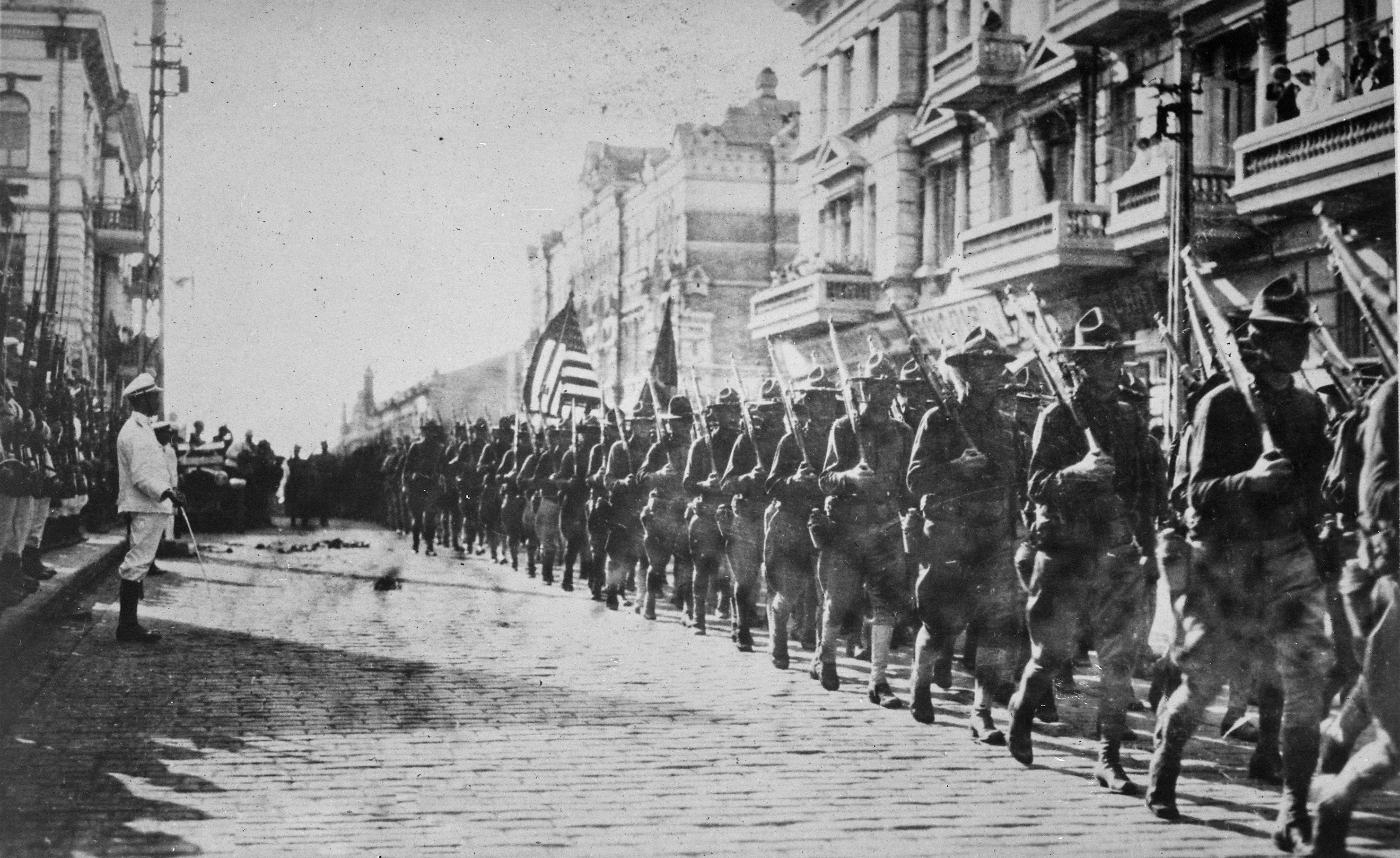
American troops marching in Vladivostok following Allied intervention in the Russian Civil War, August 1918

After the Bolshevik takeover of Russia in the October Revolution, Vladimir Lenin withdrew Russia from the First World War, allowing Germany to reallocate troops to face the Allied forces on the Western Front. This caused the Allied Powers to regard the new Russian government as traitorous for violating the Triple Entente terms against a separate peace. Concurrently, President Wilson became increasingly aware of the human rights violations perpetuated by the new Russian Soviet Federative Socialist Republic, and opposed the new regime's militant atheism and advocacy of a command economy. He also was concerned that communism would spread to the remainder of the Western world, and intended his landmark Fourteen Points partially to provide liberal democracy as an alternative worldwide ideology to Communism.

However, President Wilson also believed that the new country would eventually transition to a free-market economy after the end of the chaos of the Russian Civil War, and that intervention against Soviet Russia would only turn the country against the United States. He likewise advocated a policy of noninterference in the war in the Fourteen Points, although he argued that the former Russian Empire's Polish territory should be ceded to the newly independent Second Polish Republic. Additionally many of Wilson's political opponents in the United States, including the Chairman of the Senate Foreign Relations Committee Henry Cabot Lodge, believed that an independent Ukraine should be established. Despite this, the United States, as a result of the fear of Japanese expansion into Russian-held territory and their support for the Allied-aligned Czech Legion, sent a small number of troops to Northern Russia and Siberia. The United States also provided indirect aid such as food and supplies to the White Army.

At the Paris Peace Conference in 1919 President Wilson and British Prime Minister David Lloyd George, despite the objections of French Prime Minister Georges Clemenceau and Italian Foreign Minister Sidney Sonnino, pushed forward an idea to convene a summit at Prinkipo between the Bolsheviks and the White movement to form a common Russian delegation to the Conference. The Soviet Commissariat of Foreign Affairs, under the leadership of Leon Trotsky and Georgy Chicherin, received British and American envoys respectfully but had no intentions of agreeing to the deal due to their belief that the Conference was composed of an old capitalist order that would be swept away in a world revolution. By 1921, after the Bolsheviks gained the upper hand in the Russian Civil War, murdered the Romanov imperial family, organized the Red Terror against "enemies of the people", repudiated the tsarist debt, and called for a world revolution, it was regarded as a pariah nation by most of the world. Beyond the Russian Civil War, relations were also dogged by claims of American companies for compensation for the nationalized industries they had invested in.

==== American relief and Russian famine of 1921 ====
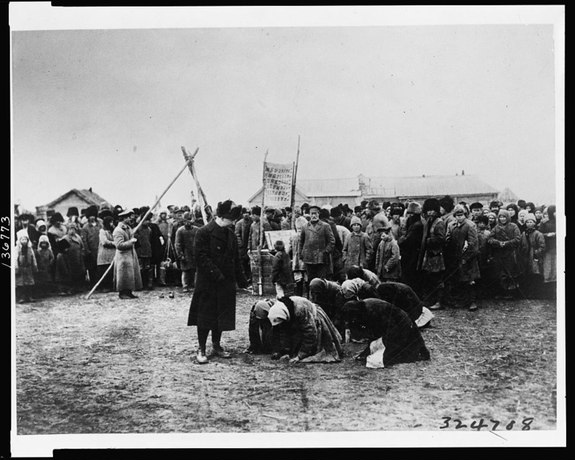
American Relief Administration operations in Russia, 1922

Under Herbert Hoover, very large scale food relief was distributed to Europe after the war through the American Relief Administration. In 1921, to ease the devastating famine in the Russian SFSR that was triggered by the Soviet government's war communism policies, the ARA's director in Europe, Walter Lyman Brown, began negotiating with the Russian People's Commissar for Foreign Affairs, Maxim Litvinov, in Riga, Latvia (at that time not yet annexed by the USSR). An agreement was reached on 21 August 1921, and an additional implementation agreement was signed by Brown and People's Commissar for Foreign Trade Leonid Krasin on 30 December 1921. The U.S. Congress appropriated $20,000,000 for relief under the Russian Famine Relief Act of late 1921. Hoover strongly detested Bolshevism, and felt the American aid would demonstrate the superiority of Western capitalism and thus help contain the spread of communism.

At its peak, the ARA employed 300 Americans, more than 120,000 Russians and fed 10.5 million people daily. Its Russian operations were headed by Col. William N. Haskell. The Medical Division of the ARA functioned from November 1921 to June 1923 and helped overcome the typhus epidemic then ravaging Russia. The ARA's famine relief operations ran in parallel with much smaller Mennonite, Jewish and Quaker famine relief operations in Russia.

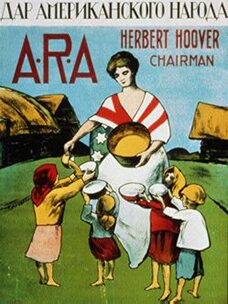
1921 ARA poster saying "The Gift of the American People" in Russian

The ARA's operations in Russia were shut down on 15 June 1923, after it was discovered that Russia under Lenin renewed the export of grain.

==== Early trade ====
Leaders of American foreign policy remain convinced that the Soviet Union, which was founded by Soviet Russia in 1922, was a hostile threat to American values. Republican Secretary of State Charles Evans Hughes rejected recognition, telling labor union leaders that, "those in control of Moscow have not given up their original purpose of destroying existing governments wherever they can do so throughout the world." Under President Calvin Coolidge, Secretary of State Frank B. Kellogg warned that the Kremlin's international agency, the Communist International (Comintern) was aggressively planning subversion against other nations, including the United States, to "overthrow the existing order." Herbert Hoover in 1919 warned Wilson that, "We cannot even remotely recognize this murderous tyranny without stimulating action is to radicalism in every country in Europe and without transgressing on every National ideal of our own." Inside the U.S. State Department, the Division of Eastern European Affairs by 1924 was dominated by Robert F. Kelley, a dedicated opponent of communism who trained a generation of specialists including George Kennan and Charles Bohlen.

Meanwhile, Great Britain took the lead in reopening relations with Moscow, especially trade, although they remained suspicious of communist subversion, and angry at the Kremlin's repudiation of Russian debts. Outside Washington, there was some American support for renewed relationships, especially in terms of technology. Henry Ford, committed to the belief that international trade was the best way to avoid warfare, used his Ford Motor Company to build a truck industry and introduce tractors into Russia. Architect Albert Kahn became a consultant for all industrial construction in the Soviet Union in 1930. A few intellectuals on the left showed an interest. After 1930, a number of activist intellectuals have become members of the Communist Party USA, or fellow travelers, and drummed up support for the Soviet Union. The American labor movement was divided, with the American Federation of Labor (AFL) an anti-communist stronghold, while left-wing elements in the late 1930s formed the rival Congress of Industrial Organizations (CIO). The CPUSA played a major role in the CIO until its members were removed beginning in 1946, and American organized labor became strongly anti-Soviet.

Founded in 1924, Amtorg Trading Corporation, based in New York, was the main organization governing trade between the USSR and the US. By 1946, Amtorg organized a multi-million dollar trade. Amtorg handled almost all exports from the USSR, comprising mostly lumber, furs, flax, bristles, and caviar, and all imports of raw materials and machinery for Soviet industry and agriculture. It also provided American companies with information about trade opportunities in the USSR and supplied Soviet industries with technical news and information about American companies. Amtorg was also involved in Soviet espionage against the United States. It was joined, in both its trade and espionage roles, by the Soviet Government Purchasing Commission from 1942 onward.

During Lenin's tenure, American businessman Armand Hammer established a pencil factory in the Soviet Union, hiring German craftsmen and shipping American grain into the Soviet Union. Hammer also established asbestos mines and acquired fur trapping facilities east of the Urals. During Lenin's New Economic Policy, which stemmed from the failure of war communism, Armand Hammer became the mediator for 38 international companies in their dealings with the USSR. Before Lenin's death, Hammer negotiated the import of Fordson tractors into the USSR, which served a major role in agricultural mechanization in the country. Later, after Stalin came to power, additional deals were negotiated with Hammer as an American–Soviet negotiator.

Historian Harvey Klehr describes that Armand Hammer "met Lenin in 1921 and, in return for a concession to manufacture pencils, agreed to launder Soviet money to benefit communist parties in Europe and America." Historian Edward Jay Epstein noted that "Hammer received extraordinary treatment from Moscow in many ways. He was permitted by the Soviet Government to take millions of dollars worth of Tsarist art out of the country when he returned to the United States in 1932." According to journalist Alan Farnham, "Over the decades Hammer continued traveling to Russia, hobnobbing with its leaders to the point that both the CIA and the FBI suspected him of being a full-fledged agent."

In 1929, Henry Ford made an agreement with the Russians to provide technical aid over nine years in building the first Soviet automobile plant, GAZ, in Gorky (Stalin renamed Nizhny Novgorod after his favorite writer). The plant would construct Ford Model A and Model AA trucks. An additional contract for construction of the plant was signed with The Austin Company on 23 August 1929. The contract involved the purchase of $30,000,000 worth of Ford cars and trucks for assembly during the first four years of the plant's operation, after which the plant would gradually switch to Soviet-made components. Ford sent his engineers and technicians to the Soviet Union to help install the equipment and train the workforce, while over a hundred Soviet engineers and technicians were stationed at Ford's plants in Detroit and Dearborn "for the purpose of learning the methods and practice of manufacture and assembly in the Company's plants".

==== Roosevelt-Litvinov Recognition Agreement of 1933 ====
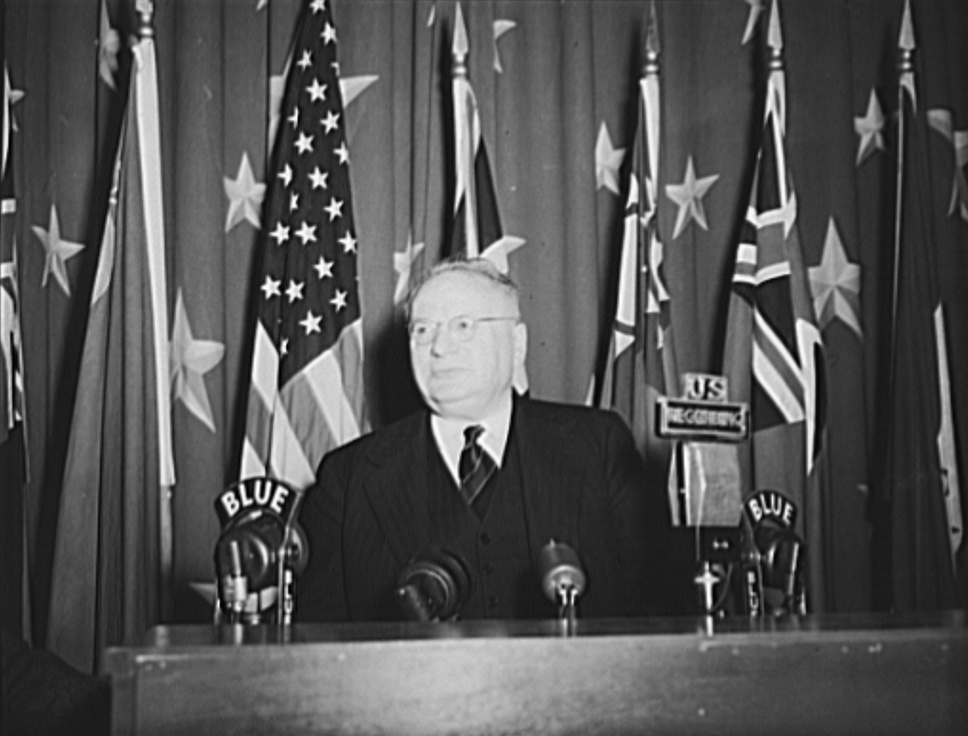
Maxim Litvinov, the Soviet foreign minister (1930–1939) and ambassador to the United States (1941–1943)

By 1933, the American business community, as well as newspaper editors, were calling for diplomatic recognition. The business community was eager for large-scale trade with the Soviet Union. The U.S. government hoped for some repayment on the old tsarist debts, and a promise not to support subversive movements inside the U.S. President Franklin D. Roosevelt took the initiative, with the assistance of his close friend and advisor Henry Morgenthau Jr. and Russian expert William Bullitt, bypassing the State Department. Roosevelt commissioned a survey of public opinion, which at the time meant asking 1100 newspaper editors; 63 percent favored recognition of the USSR and 27 percent were opposed. Roosevelt met personally with Catholic leaders to overcome their objections stemming from the persecution of religious believers and systematic demolition of churches in the USSR. Roosevelt then invited Foreign Minister Maxim Litvinov to Washington for a series of high-level meetings in November 1933. He and Roosevelt agreed on issues of religious freedom for Americans working in the Soviet Union. The USSR promised not to interfere in internal American affairs, something they would not honor, and to ensure that no organization in the USSR was working to hurt the U.S. or overthrow its government by force, similarly a broken promise. Both sides agreed to postpone the debt question to a later date. Roosevelt thereupon announced an agreement on resumption of normal relations with the signing of the Roosevelt-Litvinov agreements on 16 November 1933. There were few complaints about the move.

However, there was no progress on the debt issue, and little additional trade. Historians Justus D. Doenecke and Mark A. Stoler note that, "Both nations were soon disillusioned by the accord." Many American businessmen expected a bonus in terms of large-scale trade, but it never materialized, instead being a one-way movement that saw the United States fuel the Soviet Union with technology.

Roosevelt named William Bullitt as ambassador to the USSR from 1933 to 1936. Bullitt arrived in Moscow with high hopes for Soviet–American relations, but his view of the Soviet leadership soured on closer inspection due to the regime's totalitarian nature and terror. By the end of his tenure, Bullitt was openly hostile to the Soviet government. He remained an outspoken anti-communist for the rest of his life.

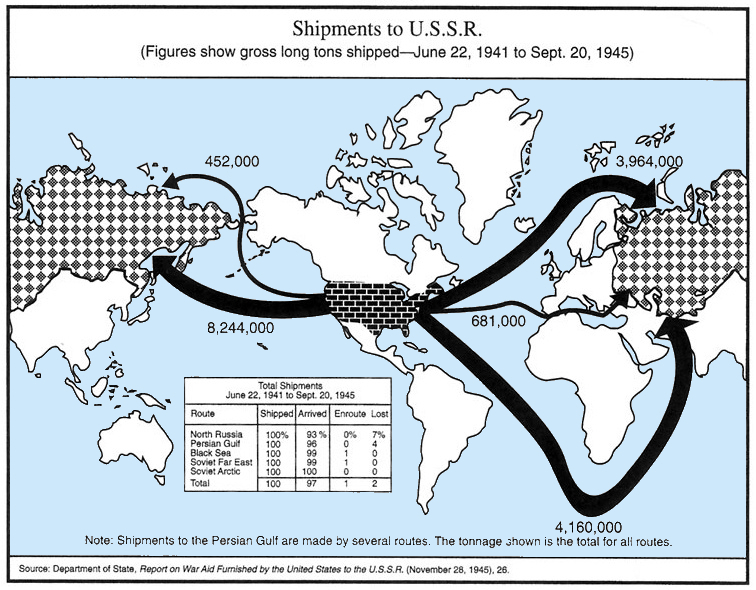
Map showing American equipment and supplies that were delivered to the Soviet Union as part of Lend-Lease

=== World War II (1939–1945) ===
Before the Germans decided to invade the Soviet Union in June 1941, relations remained strained, as the Soviet invasion of Finland, Molotov–Ribbentrop Pact, Soviet invasion of the Baltic states and the Soviet invasion of Poland stirred, which resulted in Soviet Union's expulsion from the League of Nations. Come the invasion of 1941, the Soviet Union entered a Mutual Assistance Treaty with the United Kingdom, and received massive aid from the American Lend-Lease program, relieving American–Soviet tensions, and bringing together former enemies in the fight against Germany and the Axis powers.

Though operational cooperation between the United States and the Soviet Union was notably less than that between other allied powers, the United States nevertheless provided the Soviet Union with huge quantities of weapons, ships, aircraft, rolling stock, strategic materials, and food through the Lend-Lease program. The Americans and the Soviets were as much for war with Germany as for the expansion of an ideological sphere of influence. Before the United States joined the war, future President Harry S. Truman stated that it did not matter to him if a German or a Russian soldier died so long as either side is losing.

If we see that Germany is winning we ought to help Russia, and if Russia is winning we ought to help Germany, and that way let them kill as many as possible although I don't want to see Hitler victorious under any circumstances.

This quote without its last part later became a staple in Soviet and later Russian propaganda as "evidence" of an American conspiracy to destroy the country.

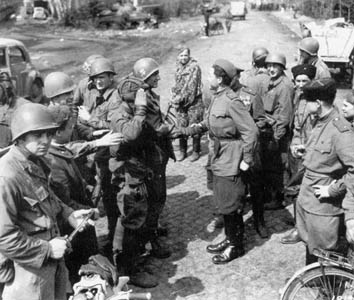
Soviet and American troops meet in April 1945, east of the Elbe River.

The American Russian Cultural Association (Russian: Американо–русская культурная ассоциация) was organized in the United States in 1942 to encourage cultural ties between the Soviet Union and U.S., with Nicholas Roerich as honorary president. The group's first annual report was issued the following year. The group does not appear to have lasted much past Nicholas Roerich's death in 1947.

In total, the U.S. deliveries through Lend-Lease amounted to $11 billion in materials: over 400,000 jeeps and trucks; 12,000 armored vehicles (including 7,000 tanks, about 1,386 of which were M3 Lees and 4,102 M4 Shermans); 11,400 aircraft (4,719 of which were Bell P-39 Airacobras) and 1.75 million tons of food.

Roughly 17.5 million tons of military equipment, vehicles, industrial supplies, and food were shipped from the Western Hemisphere to the Soviet Union, with 94 percent coming from the United States. For comparison, a total of 22 million tons landed in Europe to supply American forces from January 1942 to May 1945. It has been estimated that American deliveries to the USSR through the Persian Corridor alone were sufficient, by US Army standards, to maintain sixty combat divisions in the line.

The United States delivered to the Soviet Union from 1 October 1941, to 31 May 1945, the following: 427,284 trucks, 13,303 combat vehicles, 35,170 motorcycles, 2,328 ordnance service vehicles, 2,670,371 tons of petroleum products (gasoline and oil) or 57.8 percent of the high-octane aviation fuel, 4,478,116 tons of foodstuffs (canned meats, sugar, flour, salt, etc.), 1,911 steam locomotives, 66 diesel locomotives, 9,920 flat cars, 1,000 dump cars, 120 tank cars, and 35 heavy machinery cars. Provided ordnance goods (ammunition, artillery shells, mines, assorted explosives) amounted to 53 percent of total domestic production. One item typical of many was a tire plant that was lifted bodily from the Ford's River Rouge Plant and transferred to the USSR. The 1947 money value of the supplies and services amounted to about eleven billion dollars.

Memorandum for the President's Special Assistant Harry Hopkins, Washington, D.C., 10 August 1943:

In World War II Russia occupies a dominant position and is the decisive factor looking toward the defeat of the Axis in Europe. While in Sicily the forces of Great Britain and the United States are being opposed by 2 German divisions, the Russian front is receiving attention of approximately 200 German divisions. Whenever the Allies open a second front on the Continent, it will be decidedly a secondary front to that of Russia; theirs will continue to be the main effort. Without Russia in the war, the Axis cannot be defeated in Europe, and the position of the United Nations becomes precarious. Similarly, Russia's post-war position in Europe will be a dominant one. With Germany crushed, there is no power in Europe to oppose her tremendous military forces.

=== Cold War (1947–1991) ===
Soviet Union-United States (including spheres of influence) relations
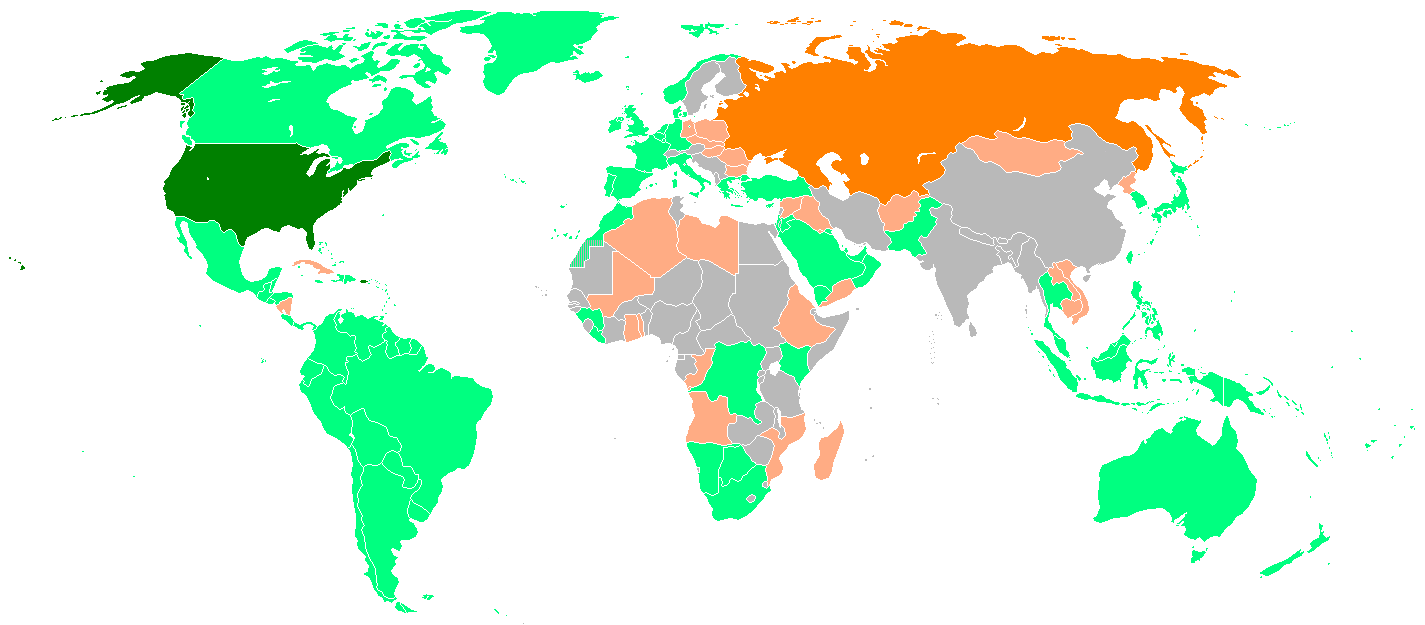

- United States: Soviet Union

The end of World War II saw the resurgence of previous divisions between the two nations. The expansion of communism in Eastern Europe following Germany's defeat saw the Soviet Union takeover Eastern European countries, purge their leadership and intelligentsia, and install puppet communist regimes, in effect turning the countries into client or satellite states. This worried the liberal free market economies of the West, particularly the United States, which had established virtual economic and political leadership in Western Europe, helping rebuild the devastated continent and revive and modernize its economy with the Marshall Plan. The Soviet Union, on the other hand, was draining its satellites' resources by having them pay reparations to the USSR or simply looting.

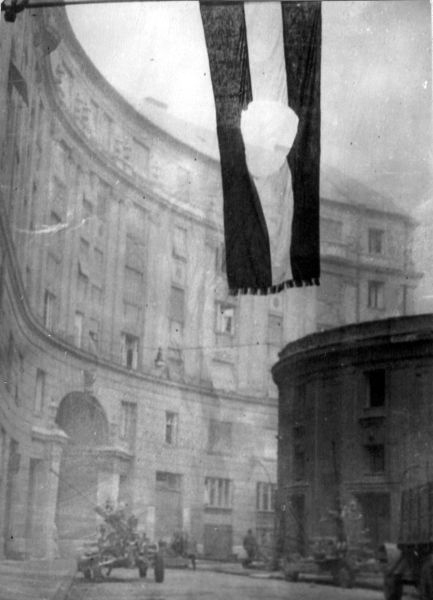
Hungarian flag (1949–1956) with the communist coat of arms cut out was an anti-Soviet revolutionary symbol

The United States and the Soviet Union nations promoted two opposing economic and political ideologies, and the two nations competed for international influence along these lines. This protracted geopolitical, ideological, and economic struggle—lasting from the announcement of the Truman Doctrine on 12 March 1947, in response to the Soviet takeover of Eastern Europe, until the dissolution of the Soviet Union on 26 December 1991—is known as the Cold War, a period of nearly 45 years.

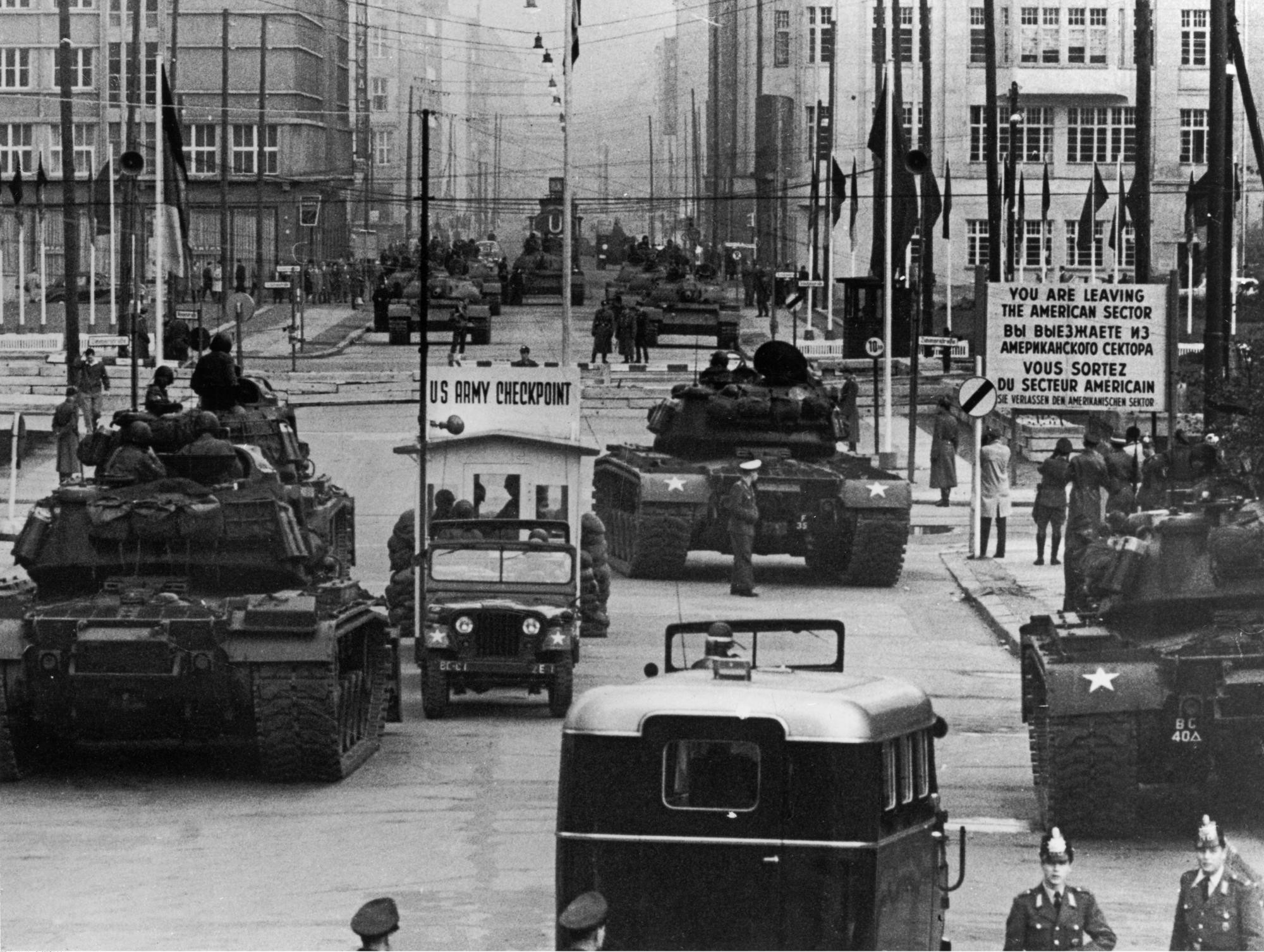
American and Soviet tanks face each other. Taken in 1961 at Checkpoint Charlie.

The Soviet Union detonated its first nuclear weapon in 1949, ending the United States' monopoly on nuclear weapons. The United States and the Soviet Union engaged in a conventional and nuclear arms race that persisted until the collapse of the Soviet Union. Andrei Gromyko was Minister of Foreign Affairs of the USSR, and is the longest-serving foreign minister in the world.

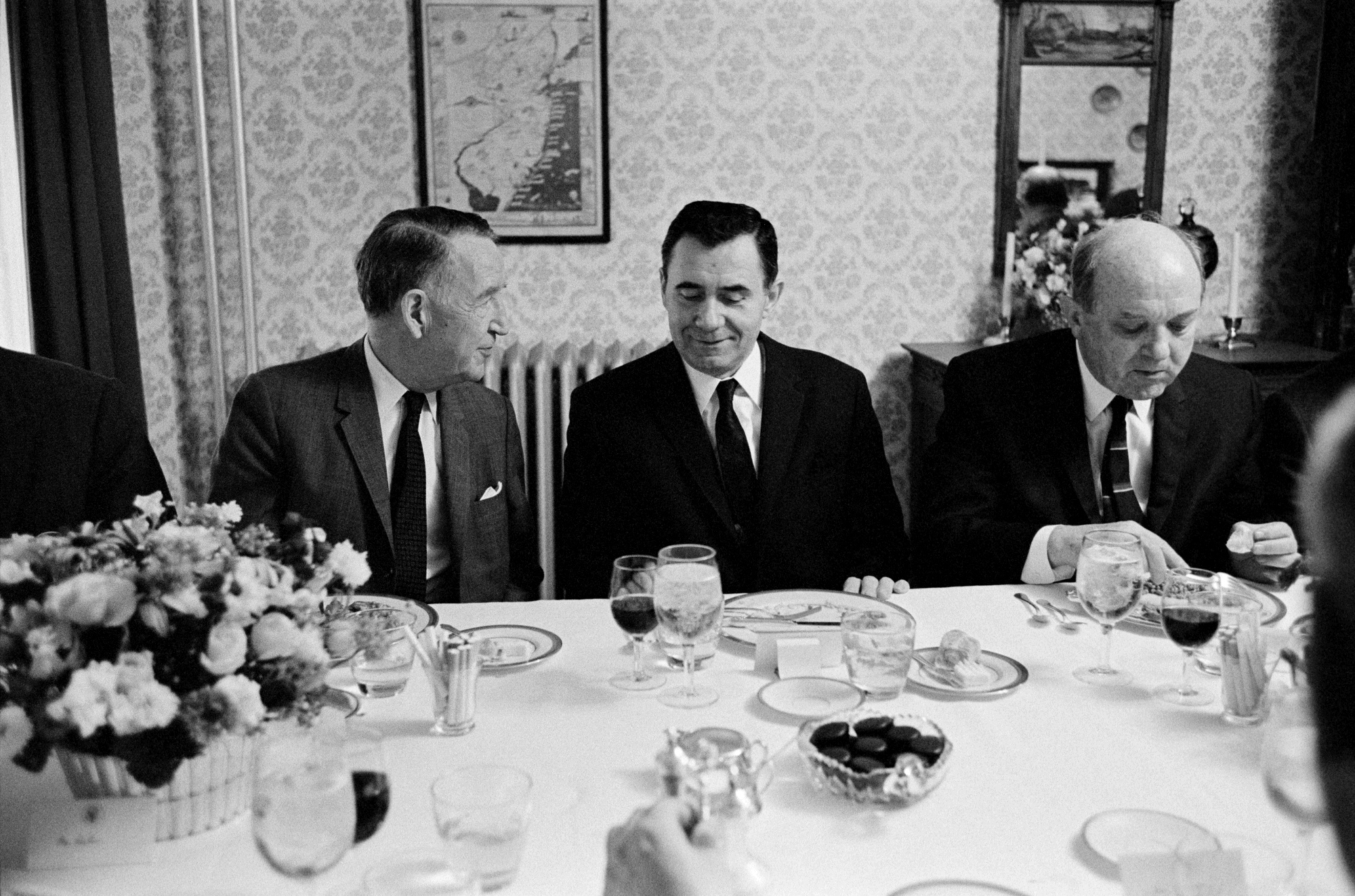
L–R: Llewellyn Thompson, Soviet Foreign Minister Andrei Gromyko, and Dean Rusk

After Germany's defeat, the United States sought to help its Western European allies economically with the Marshall Plan. The United States extended the Marshall Plan to the Soviet Union, but under such terms, the Americans knew the Soviets would never accept, namely the acceptance democracy and free elections in Soviet satellite states. The Soviet Union sought to counter the Marshall Plan with the Comecon in 1949, which essentially did the same thing, though was more an economic cooperation agreement instead of a clear plan to rebuild. The United States and its Western European allies sought to strengthen their bonds; they accomplished this most notably through the formation of NATO which was essentially a defensive agreement in 1949. The Soviet Union countered with the Warsaw Pact in 1955, which had similar results with the Eastern Bloc. As by 1955 the Soviet Union already had an armed presence and political domination all over its eastern satellite states, the pact has been long considered "superfluous". Although nominally a "defensive" alliance, the Pact's primary function was to safeguard the Soviet Union's hegemony over its Eastern European satellites, with the Pact's only direct military actions having been the invasions of its own member states to keep them from breaking away. In 1961, East Germany constructed the Berlin Wall to prevent the citizens of East Berlin from fleeing to West Berlin (part of US-allied West Germany. This prompted President Kennedy to deliver one of the most famous anti-Soviet speeches, titled "Ich bin ein Berliner".

In 1949, the Coordinating Committee for Multilateral Export Controls (CoCom) was established by Western governments to monitor the export of sensitive high technology that would improve military effectiveness of members of the Warsaw Pact and certain other countries.

All sides in the Cold War engaged in espionage. The Soviet KGB ("Committee for State Security"), the bureau responsible for foreign espionage and internal surveillance, was famous for its effectiveness. The most famous Soviet operation involved its atomic spies that delivered crucial information from the United States' Manhattan Project, leading the USSR to detonate its first nuclear weapon in 1949, four years after the American detonation and much sooner than expected. A massive network of informants throughout the Soviet Union was used to monitor dissent from official Soviet politics and morals.

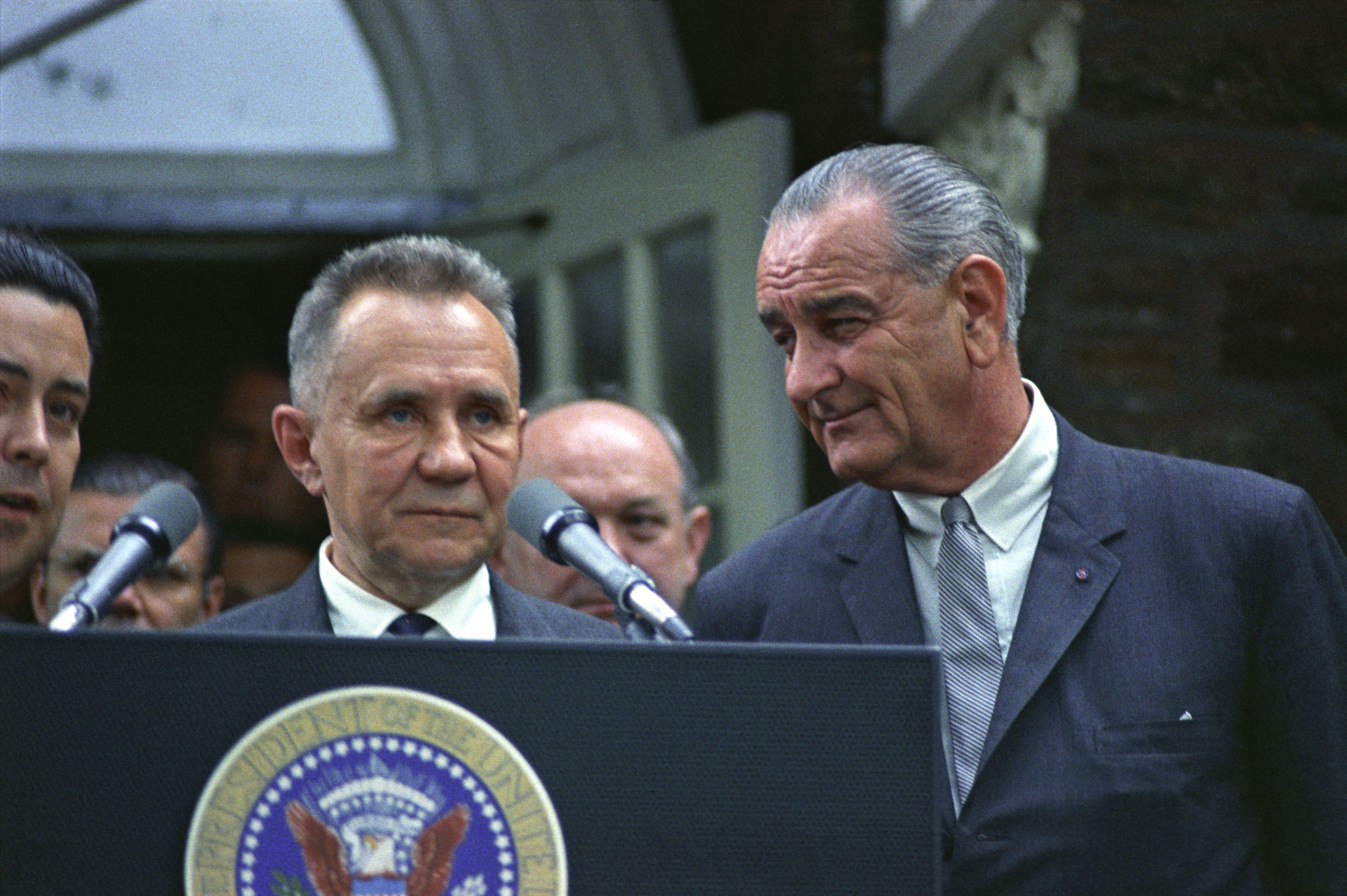
Soviet Premier Alexei Kosygin with U.S. President Lyndon B. Johnson at the 1967 Glassboro Summit Conference.

==== Détente (1969-1979) ====
Détente began in 1969, as a core element of the foreign policy of president Richard Nixon and his top advisor Henry Kissinger. They wanted to end the containment policy and gain friendlier relations with the USSR and China. Those two were bitter rivals and Nixon expected they would go along with Washington as to not give the other rival an advantage. One of Nixon's terms is that both nations had to stop helping North Vietnam in the Vietnam War, which they did. Nixon and Kissinger promoted greater dialogue with the Soviet government, including regular summit meetings and negotiations over arms control and other bilateral agreements. Brezhnev met with Nixon at summits in Moscow in 1972, in Washington in 1973, and, again in Moscow and Kiev in 1974. They became personal friends. Détente was known in Russian as разрядка (razryadka, loosely meaning "relaxation of tension").

The period was characterized by the signing of treaties such as SALT I and the Helsinki Accords. Another treaty, START II, was discussed but never ratified by the United States due to the Soviet invasion of Afghanistan in 1979. There is still ongoing debate among historians as to how successful the détente period was in achieving peace.

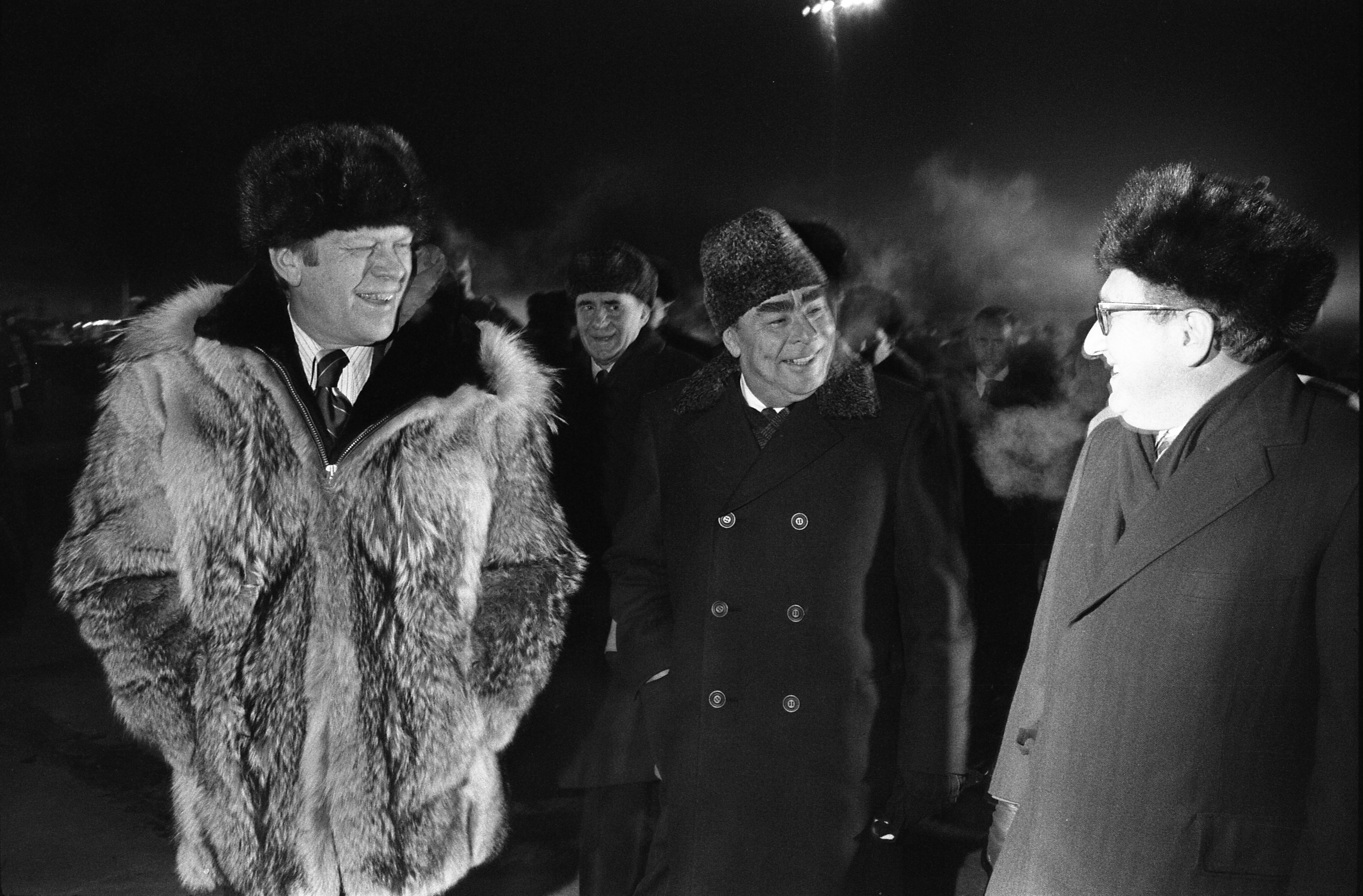
President Gerald Ford, General Secretary Leonid Brezhnev, and Henry Kissinger speaking informally at the Vladivostok Summit in 1974

After the Cuban Missile Crisis of 1962, the two superpowers agreed to install a direct hotline between Washington, D.C., and Moscow (the so-called red telephone), enabling leaders of both countries to quickly interact with each other in a time of urgency, and reduce the chances that future crises could escalate into an all-out war. The U.S./USSR détente was presented as an applied extension of that thinking. The SALT II pact of the late 1970s continued the work of the SALT I talks, ensuring further reduction in arms by the USSR and by the U.S. The Helsinki Accords, in which the Soviets promised to grant free elections in Europe, has been called a major concession to ensure peace by the Soviets. In addition to cooperation in disarmament, the Soviet Union and the United States started to collaborate in the field of ecology, becoming involved in two intergovernmental scientific programs: the UNESCO program "Man and the Biosphere" (MAB) in 1970, and the UN Environment Program (UNEP) in 1972.

In practice, the Soviet government significantly curbed the rule of law, civil liberties, protection of law and guarantees of property, which were considered examples of "bourgeois morality" by Soviet legal theorists such as Andrey Vyshinsky. The Soviet Union signed legally-binding human rights documents, such as the International Covenant on Civil and Political Rights in 1973 and the Helsinki Accords in 1975, but they were neither widely known or accessible to people living under Communist rule, nor were they taken seriously by the Communist authorities. Human rights activists in the Soviet Union were regularly subjected to harassment, repressions and arrests.

Détente is considered to have ended after the Soviet intervention in Afghanistan in 1979, which led to the US' boycott of the 1980 Moscow Olympics. Ronald Reagan's election as president in 1980, based in large part on an anti-détente campaign, induced a period of rising tension. In his first press conference, Reagan claimed that the US's pursuit of détente had been used by the Soviet Union to further its interests.

The pro-Soviet American business magnate Armand Hammer of Occidental Petroleum often mediated trade relations. Author Daniel Yergin, in his book The Prize, writes that Hammer "ended up as a go-between for five Soviet General Secretaries and seven U.S. Presidents." Hammer had extensive business relationship in the Soviet Union stretching back to the 1920s with Lenin's approval. According to Christian Science Monitor in 1980, "although his business dealings with the Soviet Union were cut short when Stalin came to power, he had more or less single-handedly laid the groundwork for the [1980] state of Western trade with the Soviet Union." In 1974, Brezhnev "publicly recognized Hammer's role in facilitating East-West trade." By 1981, according to the New York Times in that year, Hammer was on a "first-name basis with Leonid Brezhnev."

==== Resumption and thaw of the Cold War (1980s) ====
===== Tensions in détente =====
Despite the otherwise improvement in relations, various tensions would appear during détente. These included the Brezhnev Doctrine, which allowed from Soviet invasions of Warsaw Pact states to keep them under communist rule, the Sino-Soviet split, an apparent rapprochement between the United States and China with Richard Nixon's visit to China in 1972. However, Nixon's international relations priority was Soviet détente even after the visit to China. In 1973, Nixon announced his administration was committed to seeking most favored nation trade status with the USSR, which was challenged by Congress in the Jackson-Vanik Amendment. The United States had long linked trade with the Soviet Union to its foreign policy toward the Soviet Union and, especially since the early 1980s, to Soviet human rights policies. The Jackson-Vanik Amendment, which was attached to the 1974 Trade Act, linked the granting of most-favored-nation to the USSR to the right of persecuted Soviet Jews to emigrate. Because the Soviet Union refused the right of emigration to Jewish refuseniks, the ability of the President to apply most-favored nation trade status to the Soviet Union was restricted.

===== Soviet invasion of Afghanistan and end of détente =====
Détente, also described as linkage policy in the West, was challenged by proxy conflicts and increasing Soviet interventions, which included the Second Yemenite War of 1979. The period of détente ended after the Soviet invasion of Afghanistan, which led to the United States-led 66-nation boycott of the 1980 Olympics in Moscow. The United States, Pakistan, and their allies supported the rebels. To punish Moscow, President Jimmy Carter imposed a grain embargo. Carter also recalled the US Ambassador Thomas J. Watson from Moscow, suspended high-technology exports to the Soviet Union and limited ammonia imports from the Soviet Union. According to a 1980 paper, the grain embargo hurt American farmers more than it did the Soviet economy. Other nations sold their own grain to the USSR, and the Soviets had ample reserve stocks. President Ronald Reagan resumed sales in 1981. Reagan's election as president in 1980 was further based in large part on an anti-détente campaign. In his first press conference, President Reagan said "Détente's been a one-way street that the Soviet Union has used to pursue its aims." Following this, relations turned increasingly sour with the Soviet repression of anti-occupation resistance in Poland, end of the SALT II negotiations, and the subsequent NATO exercise in 1983.

===== Reagan attacks Soviet Union in "Evil Empire" speech =====
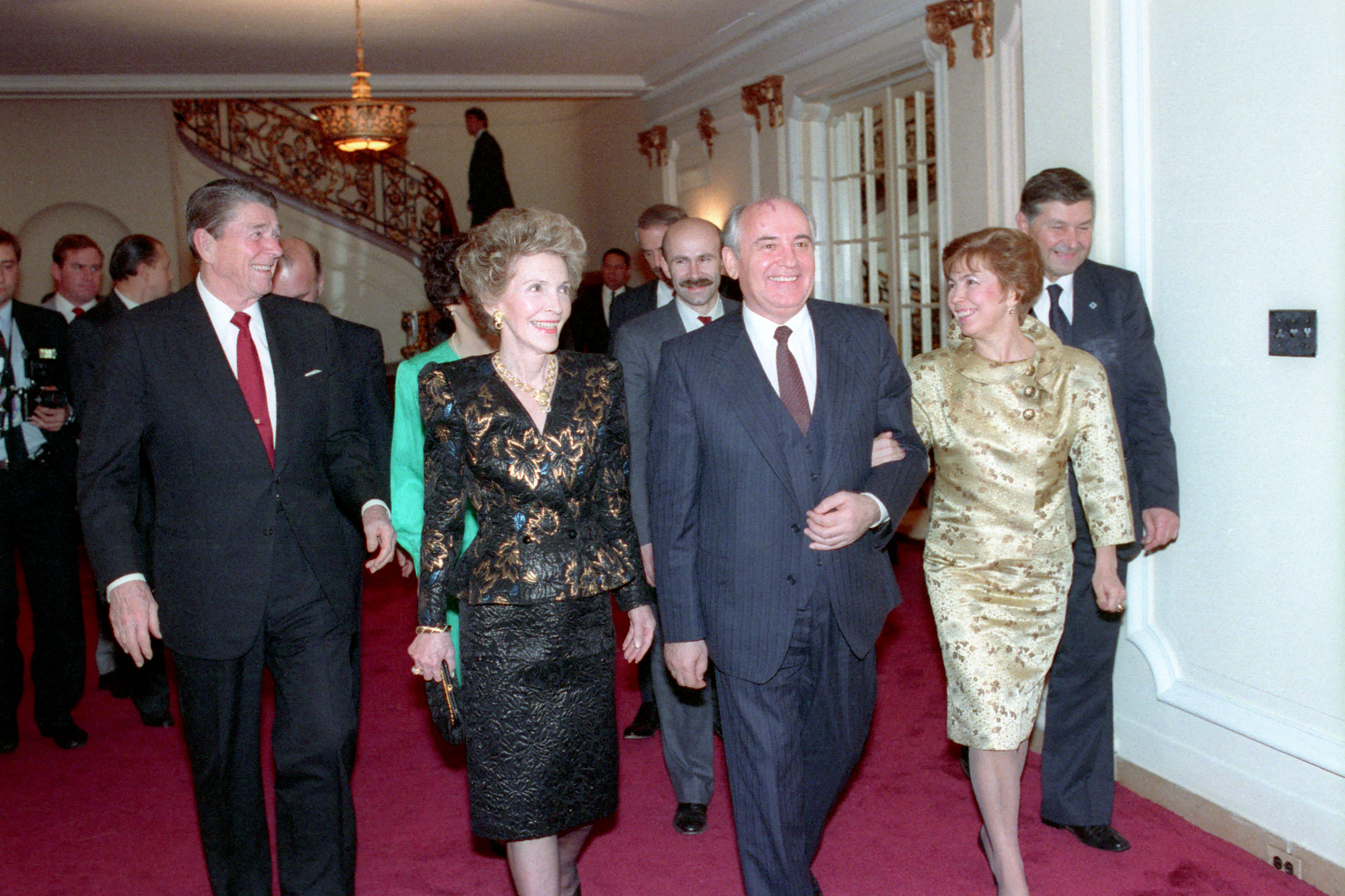
Ronald Reagan and Mikhail Gorbachev with wives attending a dinner at the Soviet Embassy in Washington, 9 December 1987

Reagan escalated the Cold War, accelerating a reversal from the policy of détente, which had begun in 1979 after the Soviet invasion of Afghanistan. Reagan feared that the Soviet Union had gained a military advantage over the United States, and the Reagan administration hoped that heightened military spending would grant the U.S. military superiority and weaken the Soviet economy. Reagan ordered a massive buildup of the United States Armed Forces, directing funding to the B-1 Lancer bomber, the B-2 Spirit bomber, cruise missiles, the MX missile, and the 600-ship Navy. In response to Soviet deployment of the SS-20, Reagan oversaw NATO's deployment of the Pershing missile in West Germany. The president also strongly denounced the Soviet Union and communist totalitarianism in moral terms, denouncing the Soviet Union as an "evil empire".

=== End of the Cold War (1989–1991) ===
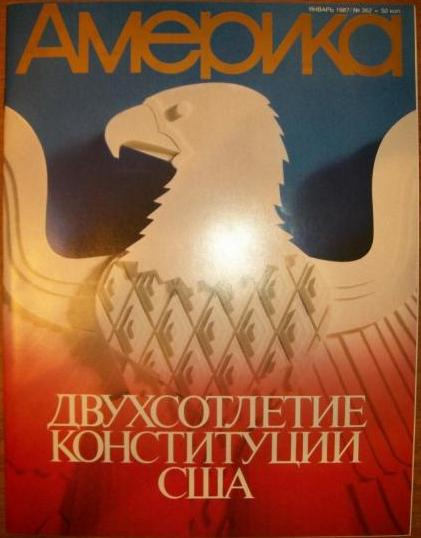
1987, American anti-communist poster dedicated to the 200th anniversary of the U.S. Constitution, printed in Russian by Amerika (magazine)

The failing Soviet economy and a disastrous war in Afghanistan contributed to Mikhail Gorbachev's rise to power, who introduced political reforms called glasnost and perestroika aimed at liberalizing the Soviet economy and society. At the Malta Summit of December 1989, both the leaders of the United States and the Soviet Union declared the Cold War over, and the Soviet forces retreated from Afghanistan. In 1991, the two countries were partners in the Gulf War against Iraq, a longtime Soviet ally. On 31 July 1991, the START I treaty cutting the number of deployed nuclear warheads of both countries was signed by Gorbachev and Bush. START negotiated the largest and most complex arms control treaty in history, and its final implementation in late 2001 resulted in the removal of about 80% of all strategic nuclear weapons then in existence.

Reagan and Gorbachev had eased Cold War tensions during Reagan's second term, but Bush was initially skeptical of Soviet intentions. During the first year of his tenure, Bush pursued what Soviets referred to as the pauza, a break in Reagan's détente policies. While Bush implemented his pauza policy in 1989, Soviet satellites in Eastern Europe challenged Soviet domination. Bush helped convince Polish Communist leaders to allow democratic elections in June, won by the anti-Communists. In 1989, Communist governments fell in all the satellites, with significant violence only in Romania. In November 1989, massive popular demand forced the government of East Germany to open the Berlin Wall, and it was soon demolished by Berliners. Gorbachev refused to send in the Soviet military, effectively abandoning the Brezhnev Doctrine. Within a few weeks Communist regimes across Eastern Europe collapsed, and Soviet-supported parties across the globe became demoralized. The U.S. was not directly involved in these upheavals, but the Bush administration avoided the appearance of gloating over the NATO victory to avoid undermining further democratic reforms, especially in the USSR.

Bush and Gorbachev met in December 1989 at the summit on the island of Malta. Bush sought cooperative relations with Gorbachev throughout the remainder of his term, putting his trust in Gorbachev to suppress the remaining Soviet hard-liners. The key issue at the Malta Summit was the potential reunification of Germany. While Britain and France were wary of a re-unified Germany, Bush pushed for German reunification alongside West German Chancellor Helmut Kohl. Gorbachev resisted the idea of a reunified Germany, especially if it became part of NATO, but the upheavals of the previous year had sapped his power at home and abroad. Gorbachev agreed to hold "Two-Plus-Four" talks among the United States, the Soviet Union, France, Britain, West Germany, and East Germany, which commenced in 1990. After extensive negotiations, Gorbachev eventually agreed to allow a reunified Germany to be a part of NATO. With the signing of the Treaty on the Final Settlement with Respect to Germany, Germany officially reunified in October 1990.

==== Dissolution of the Soviet Union ====
The Soviet Union dissolved into fifteen independent states in 1991; the USSR's successor state Russia is in pink.

While Gorbachev acquiesced to the democratization of Soviet satellite states, he suppressed separatist movements within the Soviet Union itself. Stalin had occupied and annexed the Baltic states of Lithuania, Latvia, and Estonia in the 1940s. The old leadership was executed or deported or fled; hundreds of thousands of Russians moved in, but nowhere were they a majority. Hatreds simmered. Lithuania's March 1990 proclamation of independence was strongly opposed by Gorbachev, who feared that the Soviet Union could fall apart if he allowed Lithuania's independence. The United States had never recognized the Soviet incorporation of the Baltic states, and the crisis in Lithuania left Bush in a difficult position. Bush needed Gorbachev's cooperation in the reunification of Germany, and he feared that the collapse of the Soviet Union could leave nuclear arms in dangerous hands. The Bush administration mildly protested Gorbachev's suppression of Lithuania's independence movement, but took no action to directly intervene. Bush warned independence movements of the disorder that could come with secession from the Soviet Union; in a 1991 address that critics labeled the "Chicken Kiev speech", he cautioned against "suicidal nationalism".

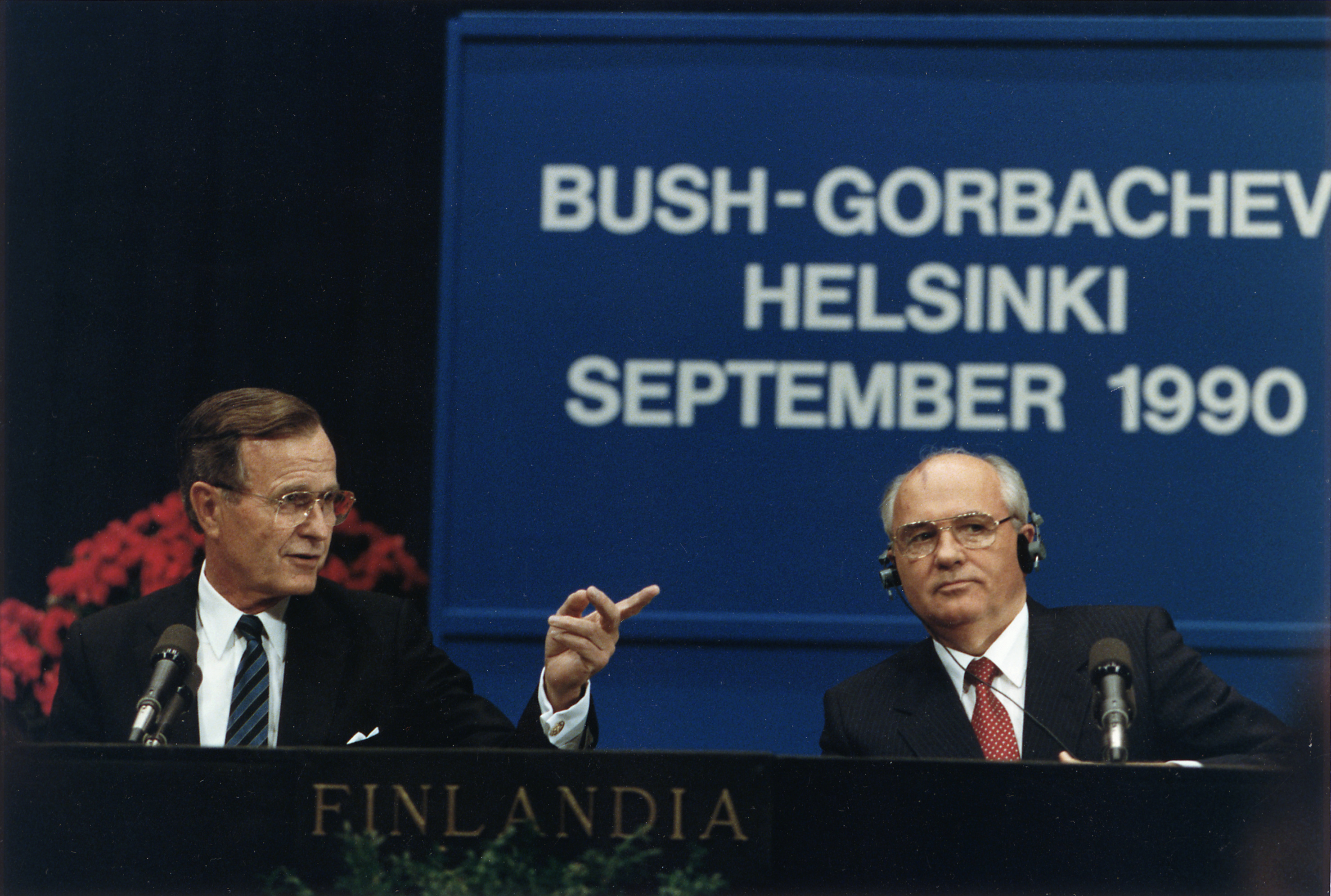
Bush and Gorbachev at the Helsinki Summit in 1990

In July 1991, Bush and Gorbachev signed the Strategic Arms Reduction Treaty (START I) treaty, the first major arms agreement since the 1987 Intermediate Ranged Nuclear Forces Treaty. Both countries agreed to cut their strategic nuclear weapons by 30 percent, and the Soviet Union promised to reduce its intercontinental ballistic missile force by 50 percent. Along with this, American businesses started to enter the liberalized Soviet economy, leading to famous U.S. companies opening their stores in Russia. Perhaps the most famous example is McDonald's, whose first restaurant in Moscow led to a culture shock on behalf of bewildered Soviet citizens, who stood in huge lines to buy American fast food. The first McDonald's in the country had a grand opening on Moscow's Pushkin Square on 31 January 1990 with approximately 38,000 customers waiting in hours long lines, breaking company records at the time. In August 1991, hard-line conservative Communists launched a coup attempt against Gorbachev; while the coup quickly fell apart, it broke the remaining power of Gorbachev and the central Soviet government. Later that month, Gorbachev resigned as general secretary of the Communist party, and Russian President Boris Yeltsin ordered the seizure of Soviet property. Gorbachev clung to power as the President of the Soviet Union until 25 December 1991, when the USSR dissolved. Fifteen states emerged from the Soviet Union, with by far the largest and most populous one (which also was the founder of the Soviet state with the October Revolution in Petrograd), the Russian Federation, taking full responsibility for all the rights and obligations of the USSR under the Charter of the United Nations, including the financial obligations. As such, Russia assumed the Soviet Union's UN membership and permanent membership on the Security Council, nuclear stockpile and the control over the armed forces; Soviet embassies abroad became Russian embassies. Bush and Yeltsin met in February 1992, declaring a new era of "friendship and partnership". In January 1993, Bush and Yeltsin agreed to START II, which provided for further nuclear arms reductions on top of the original START treaty.

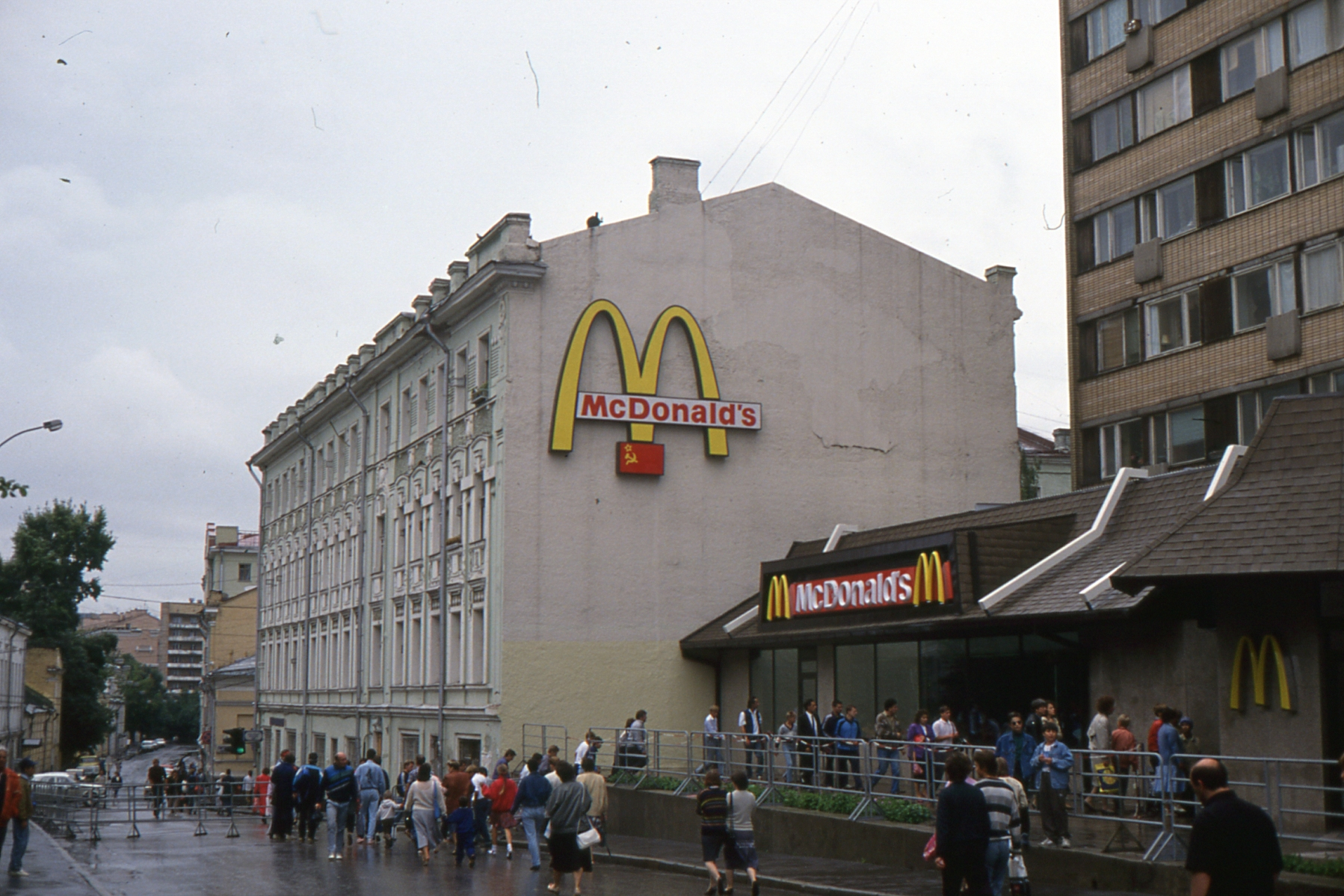
The first Russian McDonald's on Moscow's Pushkin Square, pictured in 1991

== Relations between the Post-Soviet states and the United States ==
- Armenia
- Azerbaijan
- Belarus
- Estonia
- (Georgia (country)) Georgia
- Kazakhstan
- Kyrgyzstan
- Latvia
- Lithuania
- Moldova
- Russia
- Tajikistan
- Turkmenistan
- Ukraine
- Uzbekistan

== See also ==
- Russia–United States relations
- Russian Empire–United States relations
- Russia–NATO relations
- List of Soviet Union–United States summits
- Foreign relations of Russia
- Foreign relations of the Soviet Union
- Foreign policy of the Russian Empire
- Peaceful coexistence
- International relations (1814–1919)
- Diplomatic history of World War I
- International relations (1919–1939)
- Diplomatic history of World War II
- Soviet Empire
- Eastern Bloc
- Cold War

== Sources ==
- Hardesty, Von (1991) [1982]. Red phoenix : the rise of Soviet air power, 1941–1945. Washington, D.C.: Smithsonian Institution Press. ISBN 0-87474-510-1.
- Smith, Jean Edward (2007). FDR. New York: Random House. ISBN 9781400061211. 858 pp
- Weeks, Albert L. (2004), Russia's Life-Saver: Lend-Lease Aid to the U.S.S.R. in World War II, Lanham, Maryland: Lexington Books, ISBN 978-0-7391-0736-2
