= Consulate General of the United States, Odesa =

Consulate of the United States, Odesa
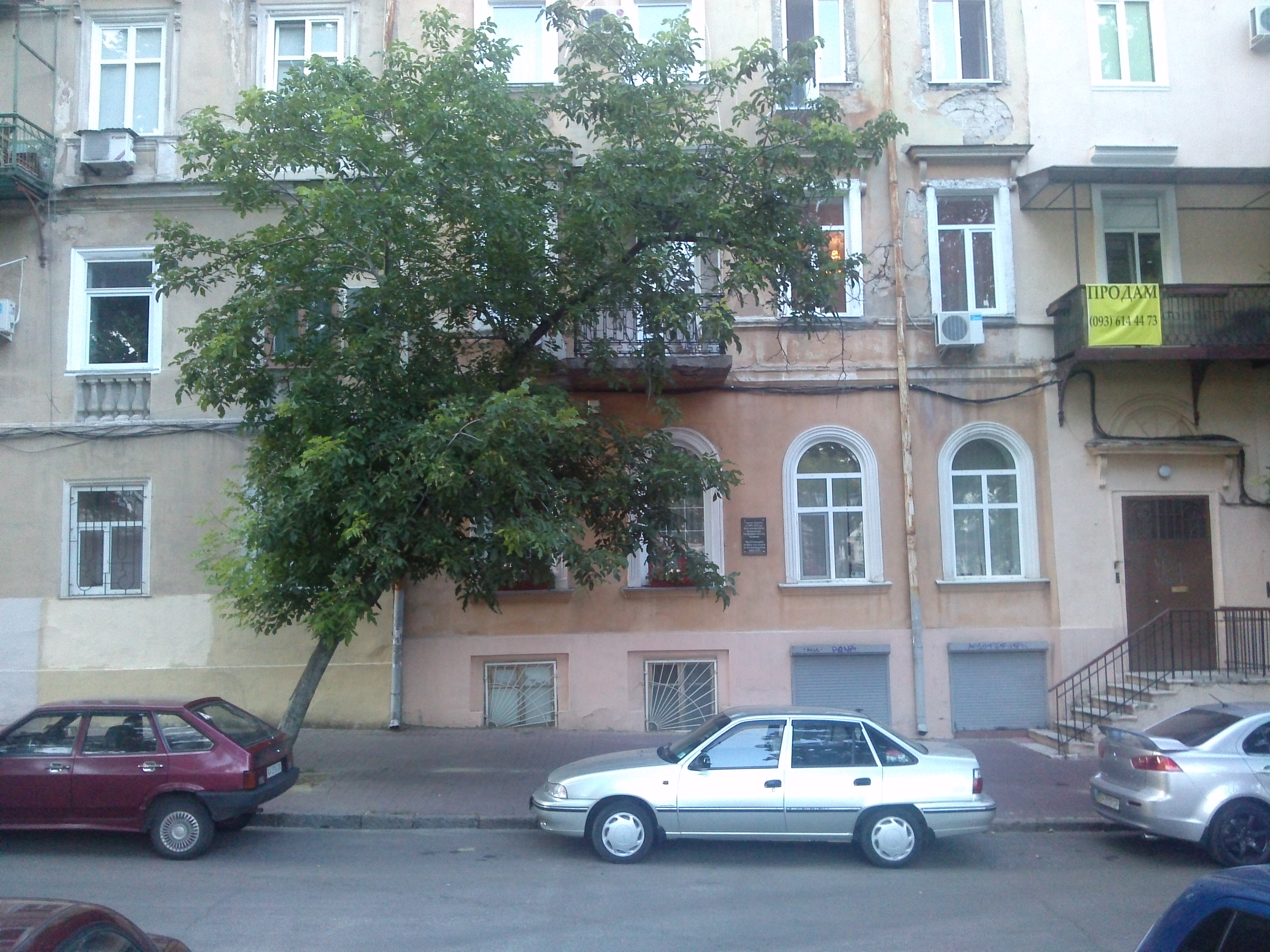
- Location: Odesa, Russia
- Address: Chaykovsky Lane, 6
- Opened: 1830
- Closed: 1918
- Consul General: 1st consul Charles Rynd (as Чарльз Райнд in Ukrainian)
- Website: http://ukraine.usembassy.gov

The Consulate of the United States, Odesa was a diplomatic institution of the United States in Odesa in operation from 1830 to 1918.

== History ==
On April 14, 1792, the United States Congress adopted provisions about the functioning of American consulates abroad. Aiming to promote the development of the USA's commercial opportunities abroad and support American sailors worldwide, US President Andrew Jackson in 1829 appointed the first American consul in Odesa — Charles Rynd, a shipowner from New York. He arrived in Odesa in 1830. At that time, Odesa was rapidly developing its economic potential and trade relations, fostering commercial ties with the American side. The new consul's primary task was to conclude a trade agreement with the Ottoman Empire, to obtain permission for American vessels to pass through the Bosphorus and Dardanelles straits.

After fulfilling his mission, Charles Rynd handed over the consular powers to the wealthy Greek businessman John Ralli, who performed consular duties for thirty years until his death in 1859. Under John Ralli, his son Stefanos served as the vice-consul.

In the second half of the 19th century, about 10 consuls were recorded in Odesa. American diplomats in Odesa included Consul Leonder Dayer, Vice-Consul Folkman, Consuls Brodskago, George Scott, and Vice-Consul John Filkman. They changed very frequently, almost every year, and sometimes twice a year. The US Consulate operated in Odesa until 1918.

On June 18, 2013, US Ambassador to Ukraine, John Tefft, ceremoniously unveiled a memorial plaque in memory of the American Consulate in Odesa on the building (Chaykovsky Lane, 6), where the consulate operated from 1884 to 1891.

== US consuls in Odesa ==
1. Charles Rhind (1829–1831)
2. John Ralli (1831–1859)
3. John D. Arnold (consul 1861),
4. Timothy C. Smith (consul 1861–1874), official residence in Vermont
5. Stephen Ralli (vice-consul 1874),
6. Leander Dyer (consul 1875–1881), official residence in Tennessee
7. Fulton Paul (consul 1882–1884), official residence in New York
8. George Scott (consul 1884), official residence in Nebraska
9. Johann Hermann Volkmann (vice-consul 1884),
10. Thomas E. Heenan (consul 1885–1890), official residence in Minnesota
11. Johann Hermann Volkmann (consul 1890–1896),
12. Thomas E. Heenan (consul 1897–1905),
13. Charles Winchester Du Bouche (vice-consul 1905),
14. Alfred W. Smith (vice-deputy consul 1906–1911), official residence in Odessa
15. John H. Grout (consul 1908–1914),
16. David John Howells (vice-consul 1914),
17. John A. Embry (vice-consul 1915–1918),
18. John A. Ray (consul 1916–1917).

== See also ==
- Embassy of the United States, Kyiv

== Bibliography ==
- Saul, Norman E. (1996). "Appendix D: Secretaries of Legation and Consuls in Russia". Concord and Conflict: The United States and Russia, 1867–1914. Lawrence: University Press of Kansas. pp. 597–600. ISBN 9780700607549.
