= Elite Security Holdings =

Russian security company

- Industry: Security
- Founders: Oleg Popov, Viktor Budanov
- Headquarters: Russia

Elite Security Holding Company, or Elite Security Holding Company., is a Russian security company co-founded by Viktor Budanov, a former head of Soviet counterintelligence. It received media coverage in 2017 for winning a no-bid contract to guard the American embassy in Moscow.

== History ==
According to a Russian business registry, Elite Security (the oldest part of the Elite Security Holding Co.) was founded as a private company in 1997 by Oleg Popov together with Viktor Budanov and his son Dmitry. Viktor is known to be a former minority owner of at least three of Elite's branches; records indicate that he no longer holds any ownership stake. According to Kommersant, the company's head office in Moscow is run by Dimitry. Elite declined to comment on an inquiry by The New York Times as to the current role of Viktor and Dmitry.

=== Viktor Budanov ===
When Budanov started out in Soviet intelligence in the 1960s, his work included buying food and other provisions for double agent Kim Philby. In the late 1960s, Budanov was posted to Britain, which expelled him in 1971 under suspicion of spying for the Soviet Union. In 1992, he retired as a major-general in Russia's foreign intelligence service. In interviews, Budanov has stated that the current Russian President Vladimir Putin was his subordinate between 1987 and 1991. Budanov retired from espionage in 1992 after becoming upset by Russia's direction under Boris Yeltsin, and has since voiced admiration for Putin, crediting him with saving Russia from the chaos of Yeltsin's rule.

== American embassy contract ==
In July 2017, Putin ordered the American diplomatic missions in Russia to reduce their staff by 755 employees. In order to reduce headcount, in November 2017, the U.S. Office of Acquisitions awarded a $2.8 million no-bid contract to Elite Security to guard the American Embassy in Moscow and consulates in St. Petersburg, Vladivostok, and Yekaterinburg. While U.S. Marines continue to guard American diplomatic missions, Elite took over the tasks previously handled by local Russian guards who had been directly employed by the American consulates. These guards do not generally have access to secure areas. In awarding the no-bid contract, the U.S. stated that "no company other than Elite Security Holding Co. has preestablished and licensed operations in all four Mission locations".
