= Consular assistance =

Diplomatic services

Consular assistance is help and advice provided by the diplomatic agents of a country to citizens of that country who are living or traveling overseas.

The diplomats may be honorary consuls, or members of the country's diplomatic service.

Such assistance may take the form of:

- provision of replacement travel documents
- advice and support in the case of an accident, serious illness, or death
- advice and support to victims of serious crime overseas, and arranging for next-of-kin to be informed
- visitation contact with incarcerated nationals
- liaison with local police officials in the case of nationals abducted or missing overseas
- loans to distressed travellers
- help during crises, such as civil unrest and natural disasters
- facilitating the overseas payment of social welfare benefits
- registering citizen births abroad
- providing a list of local doctors and lawyers for medical and/or legal issues
- supervising their flag vessels in foreign harbours
- securely forwarding official forms to the home country on the citizen's behalf (for example, absentee ballots or applications for government services)

Such assistance commonly does not extend to:

- storing luggage or valuables
- intervening in commercial disputes on behalf of their nationals
- providing travel agency, banking, or postal services
- money changing
- translation and interpreting services
- legal advice or advocacy
- negotiation of special treatment, bail, or early release from prison
- criminal investigation
- employment services

== Vienna Convention on Consular Relations ==
At Article 5, the Vienna Convention on Consular Relations gives the most broad, detailed, and internationally accepted definition of 'consular functions':

== See also ==
- Vienna Convention on Consular Relations
