= Operation Monopoly =

FBI covert surveillance plan

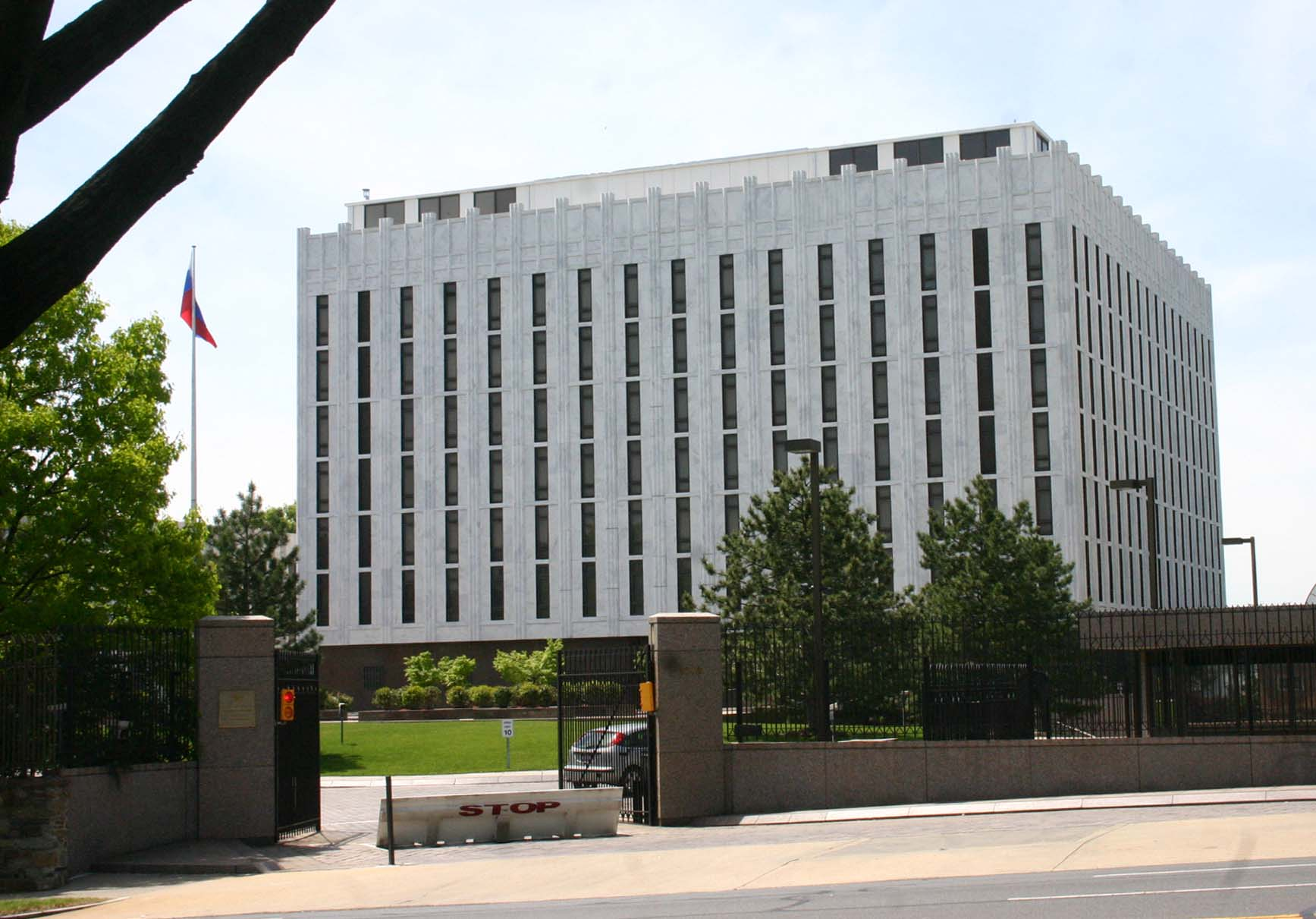
The Soviet Embassy building (pictured in 2006 as the Russian Embassy)

Operation Monopoly was a secret plan by the United States Federal Bureau of Investigation (FBI) to construct a tunnel underneath the Soviet Embassy in Washington, D.C., to gather secret intelligence, in effect from 1977 until its public discovery in 2001.

The embassy of the Soviet Union was relocated to a new building complex in 1977. The US government was afraid that with the new location, the Soviets would be able to use new technology to pick up conversations in the White House and the Capitol Building. In response to this, United States intelligence launched surveillance of their own. The FBI purchased a home that was across the street to set up a spy operation on the Soviet Embassy, and in 1977 began to dig the tunnel that would go beneath it. However, the operation was poorly planned, and construction of the tunnel encountered multiple problems. Leaks, technical issues, and insufficient knowledge of the embassy's layout caused the operation to fail. FBI assistant director John F. Lewis has noted that the tunnel produced "no information of any kind." The failure of the project is also partially explained by the revelation in 2001 that a double agent in the FBI, Robert Hanssen, had disclosed the construction of the tunnel to the Soviets while it was being built.

== Background ==
A history of spying between the Soviet Union and the United States was well established before the development of Operation Monopoly; several instances of eavesdropping between the two rivals have been uncovered. The earliest known incident took place in August 1945 when the Soviet Union had a delegation from the Young Pioneer organization present a wooden plaque of the Great Seal of the United States to the American ambassador Averell Harriman as a "gesture of friendship." Officially, it was intended to symbolize the camaraderie and collaboration between the two nations during the Second World War. The plaque was hung in the study of the U.S. ambassador in his Moscow residence. This gift actually had an ulterior motive, as it was part of an elaborate intelligence operation to eavesdrop on the diplomat. Within the Great Seal, now colloquially referred to as "The Thing", a surveillance instrument had been planted, which provided the Soviets with confidential intelligence from within the American Ambassador's residence for seven years. The device remained undetected for so long because it was a passive listening device that could be detected only when radio waves at specific frequencies were sent toward it through an external transmitter. This oversight allowed the Soviets to collect valuable information pertaining to American positions on political, military, diplomatic, economic, and technological topics.

There were other instances of surveillance as well, some which went undetected for long periods of time. Forty listening devices were uncovered in the American embassy in Moscow in 1964. These bugs had long been suspected but were found only after embassy walls were broken down. It is unknown how long they had been in place, but given their visible rust it has been inferred that they were not recent installations. In 1984, the typewriters used by U.S. diplomats were found to have Soviet transmitters concealed inside of them which allowed Soviet analysts to decipher texts that were written. When a new U.S. embassy building began construction in 1979, listening devices were built into the structure of the building while it was under construction, leaving the Americans vulnerable to Soviet surveillance operations. After the discovery of these listening devices in 1985, the "Great Transmitter", as the embassy came to be nicknamed, eventually was taken apart and reconstructed at a cost of US$240 million.

The Americans for their part also took part in covert countersurveillance. Operation Gold was conducted by the Central Intelligence Agency (CIA) in coordination with Britain's MI6 Secret Intelligence Service (SIS). A tunnel was built underneath the world's most heavily patrolled border into the Soviet occupied zone in Berlin in the 1950s to covertly monitor landline communication of the Soviet Army headquarters. While promising at first, the operation failed because British double agent George Blake informed Soviet Intelligence of its existence before it was put into use.

== Plans ==
In the midst of the Cold War, in late 1977, the Soviet Union began building a new embassy at 2650 Wisconsin Avenue NW, Washington D.C. United States intelligence worried that, because the embassy was being built on Mount Alto, the second highest point in Washington, the Soviets would have an ideal location for eavesdropping on radio communications. It was possible that, through intercepting microwaves, they could listen in on telephone calls from the White House, State Department, the Pentagon, and the CIA. Dick Alu, a former FBI agent, says "we were absolutely beside ourselves. [The State Department] never bothered to consult the intelligence community, the FBI or NSA."

Location of Russian Embassy in Washington, D.C.

To counter any eavesdropping that the Soviets could commit, US intelligence formulated a plan to bug the new embassy by digging a tunnel underneath its construction site. They would then install eavesdropping equipment inside it, allowing them an ear into the workings of the embassy. They believed this would give them access to Soviet intelligence and also information on whether the Soviets were eavesdropping on Americans. The FBI leased a three-bedroom house at 2619 Wisconsin Avenue NW, close to the site where the embassy was being built, which allowed them a place to observe the comings and goings of the Soviet embassy. They used security cameras in the windows and skylights and photographers to capture every moment. John Galuardi, regional administrator for the General Services Administration at the time, was in charge of the property that the Soviet embassy was going to be built on. Soon after the plans were made to build the embassy, Galuardi was approached by the FBI. They asked him to send workers to the site to cut down three trees on the perimeter of the property, and then to hide the stumps by making it look as if grass seed was going to be planted. This allowed the FBI an unimpeded view to the construction site from the spy house. The same house was also rumored to be the location of the entrance to the tunnel, an inconspicuous place to begin construction as there were already dump trucks and bulldozers in the area for the building of the embassy. However, this was not true, and the tunnel's actual location was likely on the other side of the Embassy.

== Construction ==
In 1977 the FBI hired a contractor and began construction, which took more than a decade and cost hundreds of millions of dollars. The classified project was then given the code name "Monopoly". As the tunnel was constructed, the FBI also monitored the construction of the embassy. They had agents pose as construction workers and subcontractors, and, on the grounds of being a "good American", they also recruited some real construction workers to plant bugs in the actual embassy itself. When construction finished for the day and workers went home, the construction site for the embassy continued to be surveilled from the house on Wisconsin Avenue.

As they built the tunnel, the NSA installed advanced eavesdropping equipment in each completed section. It was presumed that through the devices in the tunnel, the NSA could tap into telephone cables and listen in on inter-embassy calls and conversations. It is also rumored that they experimented with laser-beam technology. The tunnel itself was said to be large enough for an adult to comfortably stand up in it, and that it was well-lit and sturdily built. It was dug so secretly that John Carl Warnecke Sr., an architect on the team of designers for the embassy, was shocked to find out about the tunnel once the public became aware of it in 2001. He explained how the Soviets had also built a series of tunnels under the embassy complex, saying the design team "designed the underground passages at the request of the Soviets ... [so] I wonder how the hell [the FBI] did it. To get all that dirt out, somebody would have spotted it." It is suggested that workers who were in on the operation simply went to the construction site at night and added the dirt from the tunnel to the existing mounds of dirt from the embassy construction.

== Complications ==
From the beginning of construction, the operation had many complications, and opinions within the FBI were divided. A former senior FBI official said that they "were concerned because a lot of [their] budget was going for that purpose." If the operation ended up failing, then millions of dollars of the FBI's budget would have been wasted.

The majority of obstacles were technical, rather than political. The tunnel was not watertight and so workers had to find a way to stop water from continually leaking into it. While the blueprints obtained of the embassy were detailed, builders were not entirely sure where exactly under the embassy the tunnel was located. One FBI worker is quoted as saying:

The problem was, you didn't know where you were going to come up. We had the plans, but you don't know what a room is used for. It might end up being a Xerox room or a storage room. What you want is a coffee room where people talk. Or a secure room where they think no one can hear them.

Much of the advanced espionage technology that was installed in the tunnel didn't work, and technicians of the equipment were puzzled as to why. It was concluded that Soviet counterintelligence stopped the devices from effectively working, as the Soviets were wary of U.S. bugging attempts since the beginning of the embassy's construction. John Carl Warnecke confirmed that the Soviets had indeed been very thorough in their countermeasures against eavesdropping. They disassembled, inspected, and then reassembled every window frame before it was installed. The facing of the building used thick cuts of marble rather than two thinner layers of marble sandwiched between epoxy glue, to keep spy bugs from being implanted in the glue. Warnecke also commented on how the Soviets X-rayed "each inch of steel the night before it was put up." Yet suspicions were high on both ends. Warnecke recounted that "before lunch the KGB would come into our office in Washington, and I said to my staff, 'Tell them everything we're doing.' After lunch, the FBI or CIA would come in and say 'What did they ask?'" The Soviets also drilled thirty- to forty-foot-deep holes in the ground of the site and lowered sensors into the holes to check for any tunnels, as they had previously built tunnels under the American embassy in Moscow, and wanted to prevent the same method from being used on their embassy.

From 1977 to 1994, the embassy was either under construction or not fully occupied. It was in the early 1990s that the continual failure of American eavesdropping attempts led the FBI to suspect that there was a mole within their ranks. After an extended investigation, Robert Hanssen, who worked in the FBI's Intelligence Division, was arrested in 2001. It was discovered that the Soviets were not only suspicious of American eavesdropping, but instead entirely aware of it, as Hanssen was working as a double agent for the KGB. In 1989, more than a decade after construction of both the embassy and the tunnel began, Hanssen revealed the existence of the tunnel to the Soviets. He had multiple aliases through which he communicated with the Soviets: "B", "Ramon Garcia", "Jim Baker" and "G. Robertson". The Department of Justice indictment document for Hanssen summarizes his crimes by saying:

It was a part of the conspiracy that defendant HANSSEN would and did use his position as a Special Agent of the FBI, and his official access to classified information relating to the national defense, to acquire, accumulate, and transmit such information, including information classified SECRET and TOP SECRET, some of which was designated as SCI, to the KGB/SVR.

He was tried with 14 counts of espionage and 1 count of conspiracy to commit espionage.

The embassy was only fully occupied by the Russian government starting in 1994, after the 1991 dissolution of the Soviet Union. Because the Soviet government had known of the tunnel since at least 1989, neither the Soviets nor the succeeding Russian government ever officially operated in the building without being aware of the tunnel's existence.

== Discovery ==
The exact date when the tunnel under the embassy was discovered is unknown because of the covert nature of the operation, but with the information available, the discovery likely happened in or before 1989, the year when Robert Hanssen notified Soviet intelligence of Operation Monopoly. This compromised the entire FBI operation. The embassy was not occupied until 1994, so Hanssen's tip gave Soviet and then Russian agents five years to put countermeasures in place to combat the spying tactics of the tunnel – such as building a secure room within the embassy for sensitive discussions. While Soviet or Russian agents may have been tempted to manipulate the tunnel's operations by purposefully disseminating false information to mislead U.S. intelligence officials, the consensus among U.S. officials today is that they never acted upon this plan because success would have been too unpredictable. John F. Lewis Jr., former assistant director of the FBI in charge of the intelligence division stated, "There was no information of any kind. I don't remember receiving any intelligence," when asked whether or not he thought the Soviets or Russians spread disinformation.

While the Soviets were aware of the tunnel by 1989, the FBI did not know at that time that Operation Monopoly had been compromised. The FBI conducted covert tours of the tunnel for senior government officials and continued construction for years after 1989. Although suspicions that the project had been compromised were constantly present throughout the operation, there was no solid evidence proving this, so it carried on.

In 2001 Operation Monopoly became public knowledge when Robert Hanssen was arrested and charged by the United States district court on three counts: conspiracy to commit espionage, espionage, and attempted espionage for feeding information to the KGB. Within his indictment, Hanssen was charged with revealing to his Soviet handlers "the existence of an FBI technical penetration of a particular Soviet establishment, as well as the specific location of the penetration device, and the methods and technology utilized." The penetration device mentioned in the indictment was the tunnel, so the charge was a clear reference to Operation Monopoly. The exposure of an FBI project was breaking news to people across the United States and the world. The exception was the Russian government and former Soviet agents, who had known about the tunnel for over a decade. To hide the fact that they had already been informed of the tunnel's existence, the Russian government professed shock over the news. In Moscow, an American diplomat was summoned to explain the operation. In a statement following the exposure, a senior official from the Russian Ministry of Foreign Affairs declared, "If these reports prove true, this will be a flagrant case of the violation of generally recognized standards of international law concerning foreign diplomatic missions". Yuri Ushakov, Russia's ambassador to the United States, joked that if they found the tunnel, perhaps they "could use it as a sauna."

== Aftermath ==
After Operation Monopoly was compromised and the tunnel was discovered, the FBI had to determine their course of action for dealing with the tunnel itself. Discussions over the fate of the tunnel brought different perspectives to the table, with some FBI counterintelligence agents believing it should be filled in, while others, such as John F. Lewis advocated to keep it operational in case it could become useful in the future. In the end, a compromise was reached wherein the entrance to the tunnel at the FBI townhouse would be sealed because, as one FBI agent explained, "Of course you'd want to seal it up… How would you like to be living in the house and suddenly the Russians walk in?" Yet the tunnel would not be filled in completely, to appease those such as Lewis, who believed it could be an asset in the future.

However, much of this story is still debated among scholars, politicians, and the general public. The exact location of the house used by the FBI to spy on the embassy is unknown because the FBI never fully acknowledged the house or the whereabouts of the tunnel itself. Some reports claim the tunnel began under the house on Wisconsin Avenue, but others have claimed that the tunnel started from a house on Fulton Street NW. The general consensus though is that while many people believe they know the whereabouts of the house and the tunnel (even the International Spy Museum claims to know the positions), the exact locations remain a mystery.
