= Embassy of Russia, Washington, D.C. =

Diplomatic mission of the Russian Federation to the United States

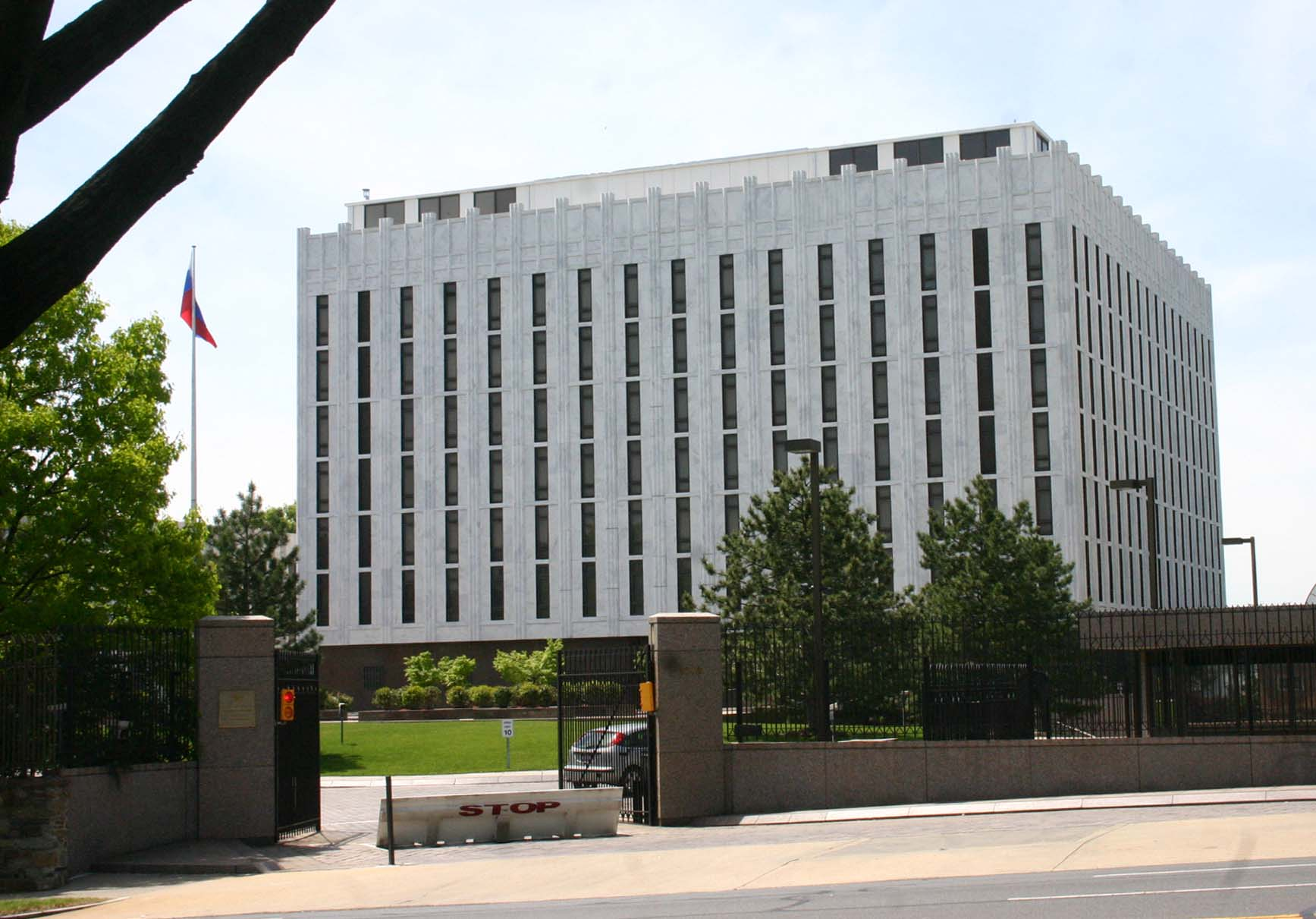
- Main compound
- Location: Washington, D.C.
- Address: 2650 Wisconsin Avenue, N.W. Washington, D.C. 20007
- Coordinates: 38°55′28.48″N 77°4′29.3″W
- Opened: 1979 (residence, school, and sports ground); 1985 (administrative and ceremonial buildings)
- Website: washington.mid.ru

The Embassy of the Russian Federation in Washington, D.C. (Russian: Посольство России в США) is the diplomatic mission of the Russian Federation to the United States. The embassy is located at 2650 Wisconsin Avenue, Northwest, Washington, D.C., and oversees consulates in New York and Houston.

The embassy is situated on the third tallest hill in Washington, D.C. called "Mount Alto" - with the hill being 107 meters above sea level and having a view of the Capitol, the White House, the Pentagon and the State Department.

== History ==
=== Russian Empire ===
In 1883, the Russian Empire starting using Boss Shepherd's mansion for their embassy. In 1913, the Russian Empire purchased Mrs. George Pullman House for $350,000 and moved their embassy there.

=== Soviet Union ===
On November 16, 1933, after the signing of the Roosevelt-Litvinov Agreement where the United States recognized the Soviet Union and diplomatic relations between the two countries began, Mrs. George Pullman House became the Soviet Union Embassy.

In 1963, due to limited space at the location, the Soviets approached the U.S. government to find a new embassy location. Initial interests for Bonnie Brae Estate on 6036 Oregon Avenue, N.W. and Tregaron Estate as possible locations did not work out, so the U.S. State Department offered the Soviets Mount Alto which was accepted. On October 4, 1967, the Soviet Union and U.S. agreed in principle to dedicate the 12.5-acre federally owned property on Mount Alto for the Soviet Embassy and an 11.9-acre area in Moscow for the US Embassy.

Prior to the embassy construction, Mount Alto had a 1901 home built for William Jennings Bryan, the National School of Domestic Arts and Science for women built in 1917, and the Mount Alto Inn hotel. In 1920 the U.S. federal government purchased the land the buildings were on for $460,000 so it could use it for the Mount Alto Veterans Hospital for World War I veterans - which was later relocated to Soldiers Home in 1965. After the October 4, 1967 principle agreement between the Soviets and the U.S., the unused hospital and local structures were razed by the U.S. General Services Administration to make way for the construction of the embassy.

On May 16, 1969, in Moscow, an official agreement called "Agreement for the Exchange of Sites" was signed by the Soviet Union and the U.S. The Mount Alto property was leased to the Soviets for an 85-year free lease, and the same was provided to the U.S. in regards to the land the US Embassy was on in Moscow.

On December 4, 1972, a second agreement called "Conditions of Construction Agreement" was signed by the Soviet Union and the U.S., which included: "site work, foundation and structure built by host country with its materials, and other systems of the buildings built using host country workers under owner’s supervision using owner’s choice of materials except inside finishing of top four floors constructed entirely by the owner." The agreement also stated that both chanceries should begin construction simultaneously and be occupied simultaneously. Under the current lease, the U.S. Office of Foreign Missions is the current owner of the land that the Russian embassy is on.

The embassy design was done by well-known Soviet architect Mikhail Posokhin, who designed the State Kremlin Palace and a number of other buildings in Moscow. John Carl Warnecke was the American architect assisting with drawing up plans for the embassy, while EDAW, which initially had been hired by the U.S. General Services Administration to do an environmental impact study of the location, would become a site planner in the construction. The embassy would be built in two phases.

In 1979, the first phase of construction was completed by George Hyman Construction Company involving a residential building, a school, a kindergarten, and a sports grounds.

In May 1985, the second phase of construction was completed by Whiting-Turner Contracting Company involving an 8-story administrative building, a 3-story consulate, and a 2-story ceremonial building. At completion the embassy cost approximately $62-$65 million.

=== Russian Federation ===
Following the dissolution of the Soviet Union on December 26, 1991, the embassy became the Russian Federation Embassy. In September 1994, during his visit to the United States, Russian president Boris Yeltsin and U.S. president Bill Clinton inaugurated the new ceremonial building of the Russian Embassy.

== Events ==
On November 16, 1933, a few hours before the signing of the Roosevelt-Litvinov Agreement where the United States recognized the Soviet Union and diplomatic relations between the two countries began, 500 packing crates of records were removed by US troops and relocated to a State Department facility. Twenty percent of the records were from the Russian Empire consulates. On January 31, 1990, the records were returned to the Soviets.

During construction of the embassy on Mount Alto, Soviet counter-intelligence found electronic bugs in a toilet partition that had been delivered to the construction site. This resulted in eight Soviets being assigned the task of observing all matters of construction, resulting in a stricter building environment. For example:

- 2 Soviets were required to be present wherever concrete was poured. Precast concrete was not allowed unless done under supervision of the Soviets.
- X-ray was used to examine all structural steel.
- Windows and doors were taken apart and put back together.
- Only 2-inch thick marble was allowed with no backing, since thin marble slabs glued onto backing could have bugs possibly hidden in the epoxy glue holding the marble and backing together.

In the late 1980s, the FBI and the National Security Agency built a tunnel under the compound for espionage purposes, but it was never successfully exploited due to FBI agent Robert Hanssen disclosing information about the operation to the KGB.

In 1985, Vitaly Yurchenko redefected here, after eluding his handlers at the Au Pied de Cochon restaurant in Georgetown.

On February 27, 2018, a one-block section of Wisconsin Avenue in front of the embassy was renamed Boris Nemtsov Plaza in honor of Boris Nemtsov, an opposition activist and vocal critic of Russian president Vladimir Putin who was shot dead by assassins while walking on a bridge near the Kremlin on February 27, 2015. The move to rename the street was initiated by then-Senator Marco Rubio, who commented that the renaming serves as "an enduring reminder to Vladimir Putin and those who support him that they cannot use murder and intimidation to suppress dissent."

== Ambassadors ==
Name	Date
Anatoly Antonov	2017—2024
Alexander Darchiev	2025—2026

== Ambassador's residence ==
The Russian ambassador's residence is located at 1125 16th Street, Northwest, Washington, D.C. Built in 1910, this Beaux-Arts mansion served as the Russian and Soviet embassy during periods of established relations between 1913 and 1994.

== Gallery ==
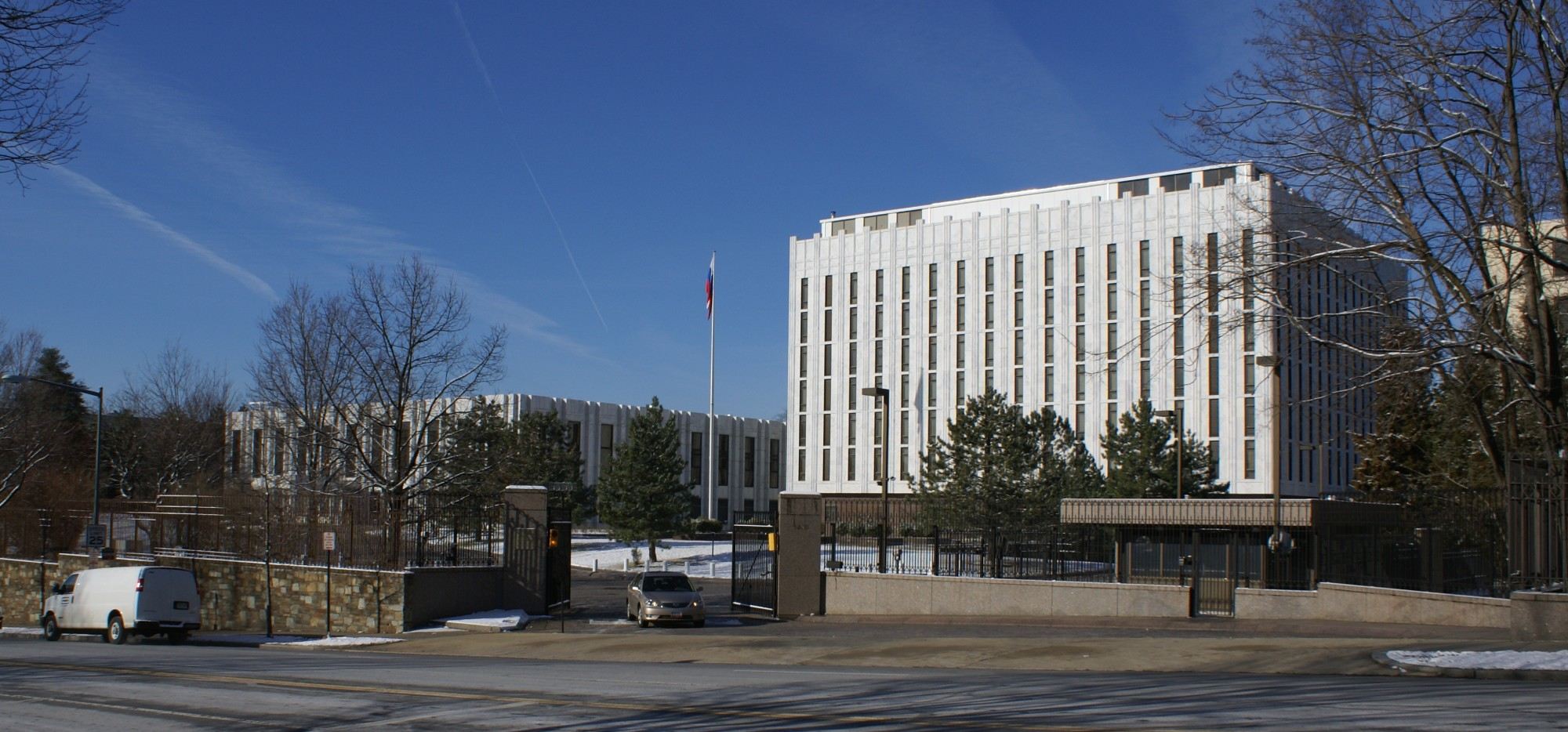
Wide shot from 2007

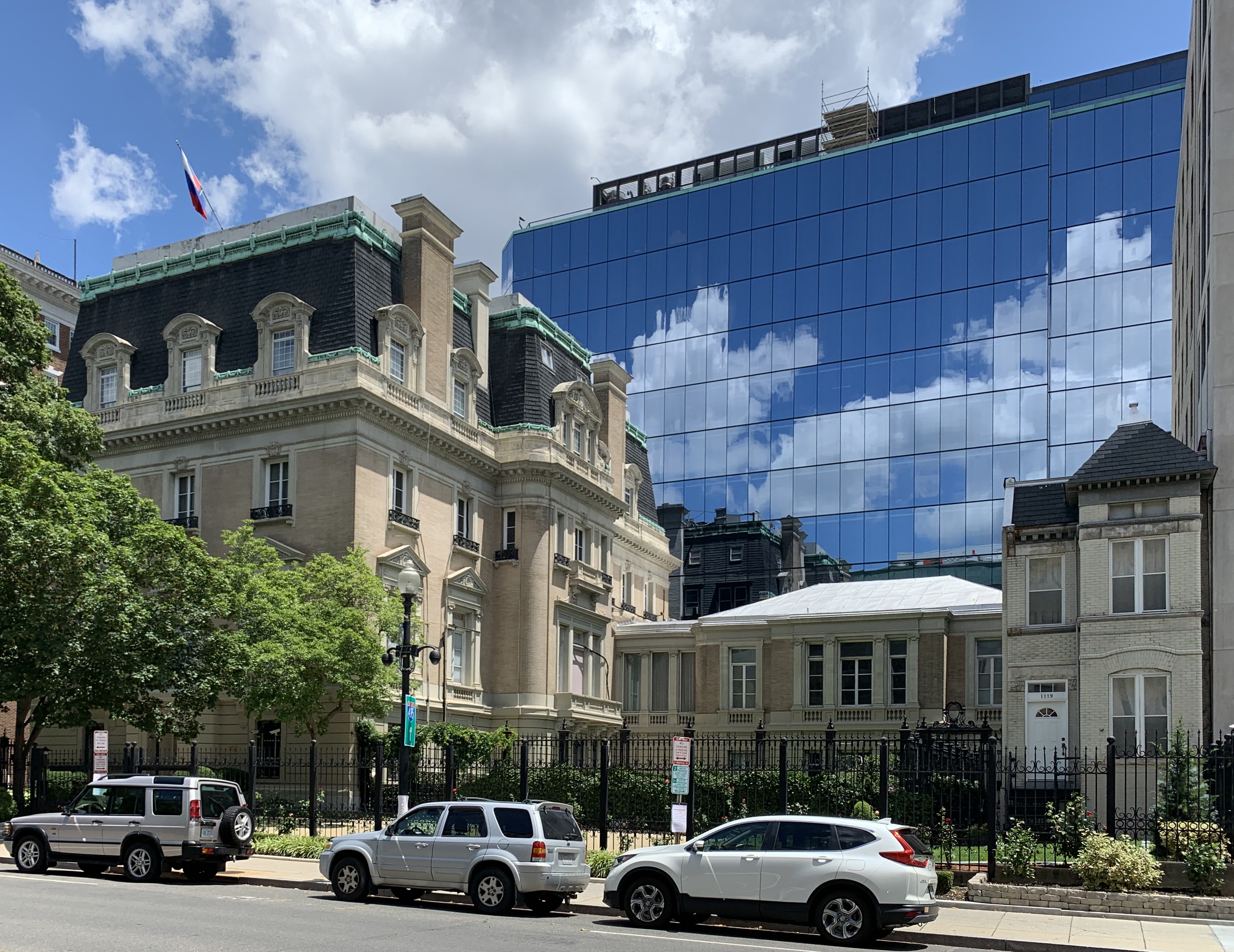
Ambassador's residence

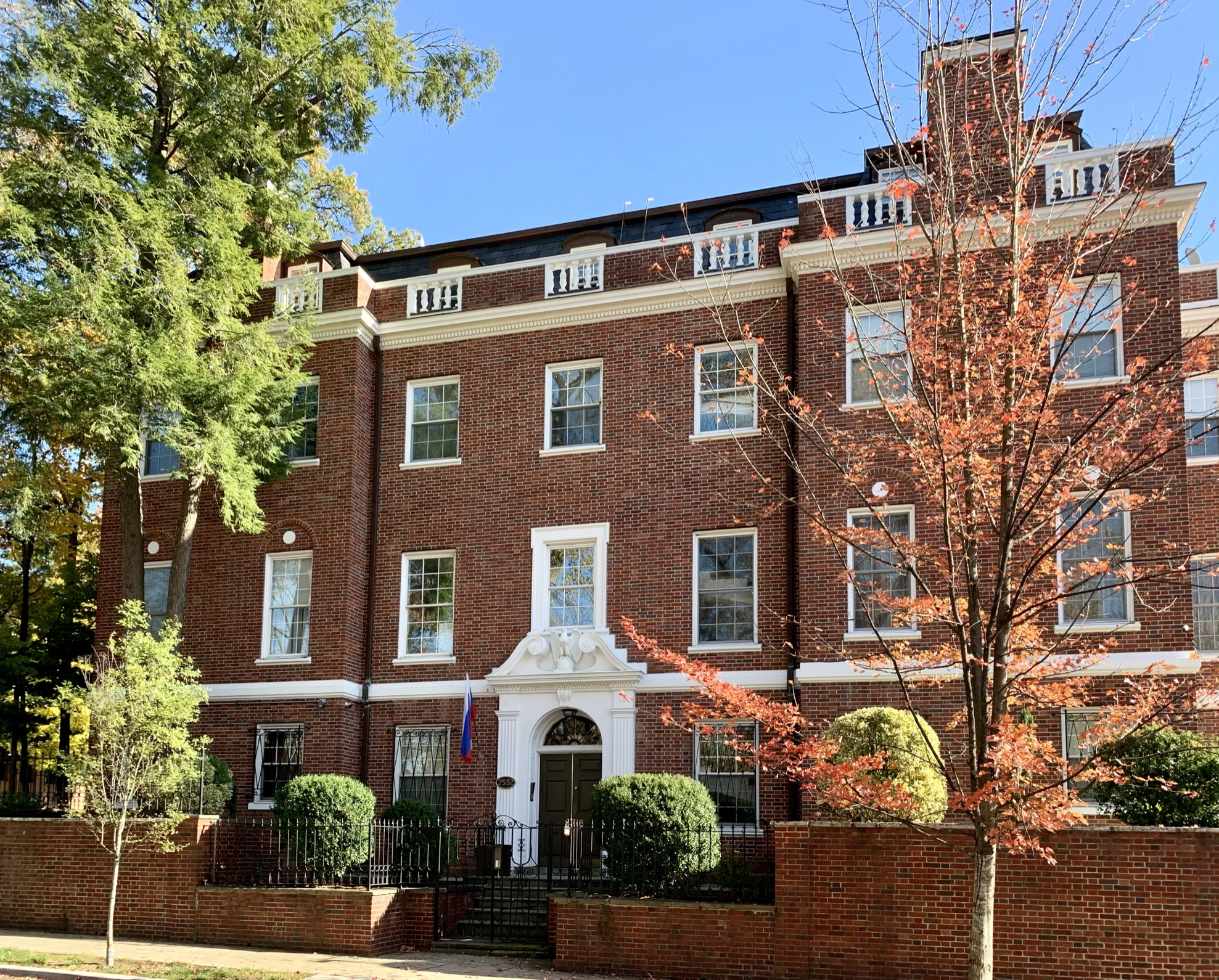
Military, Air, and Naval Attache Office

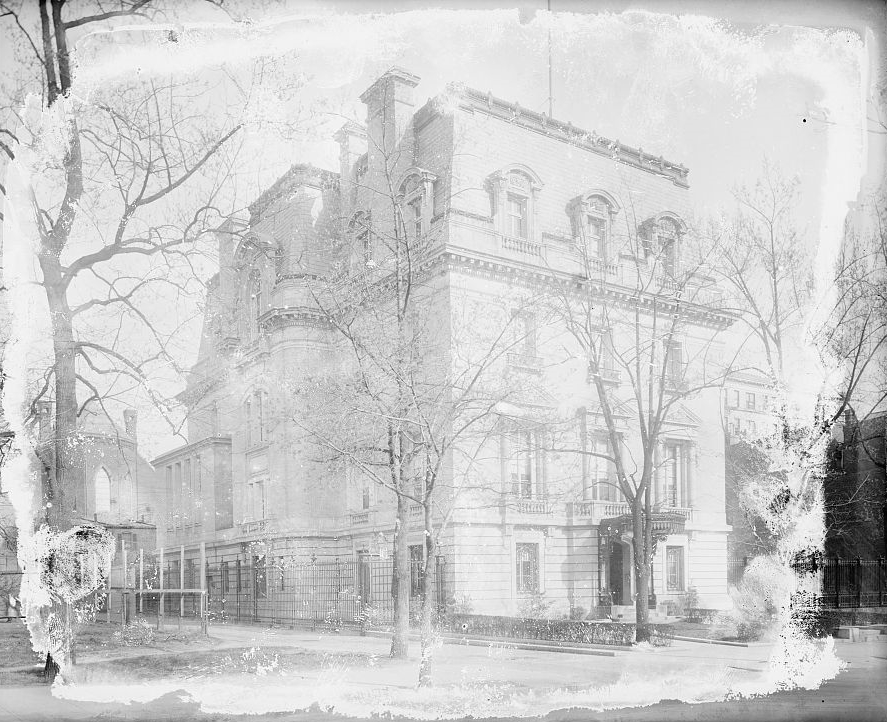
Russian Empire's Embassy

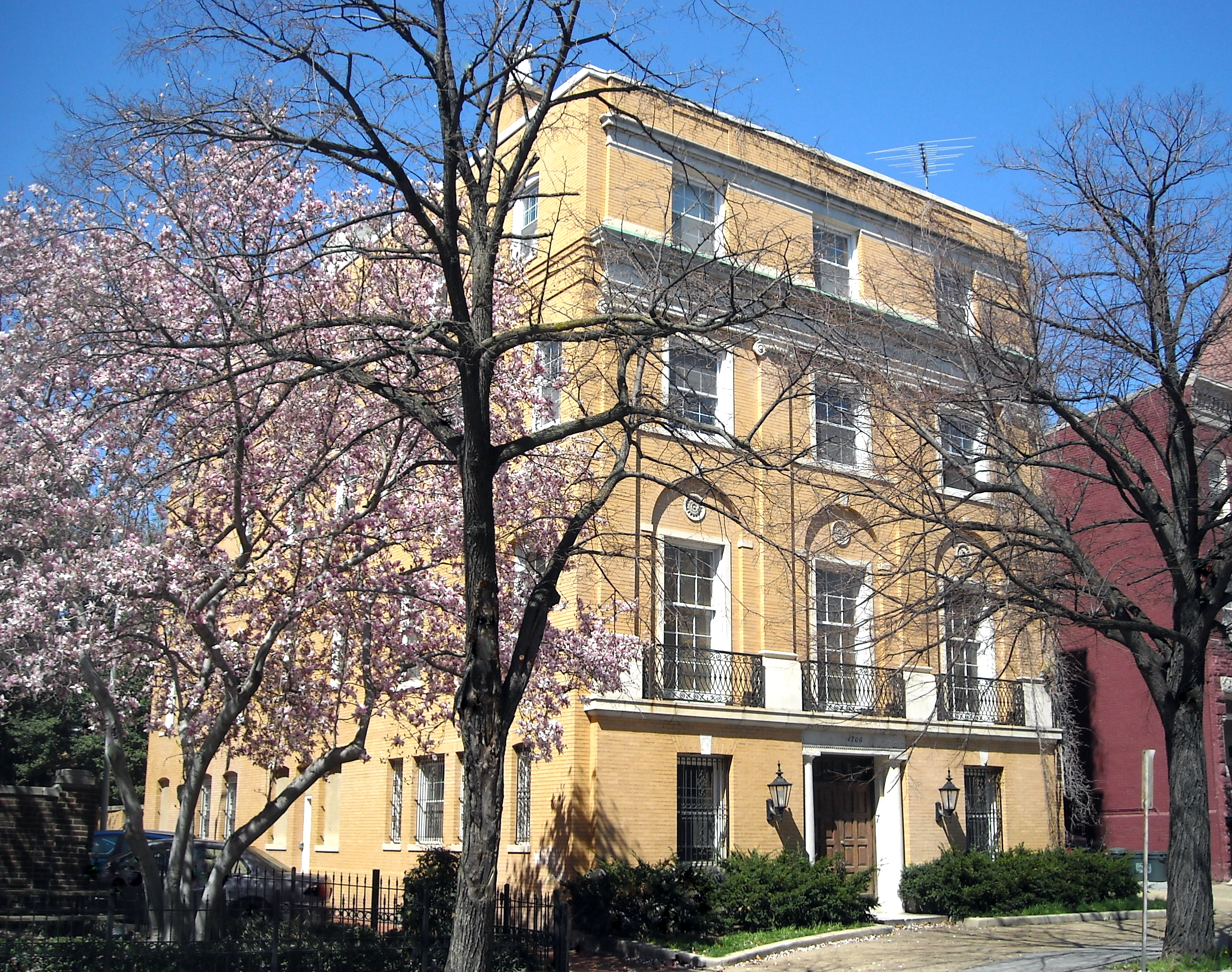
Information Office

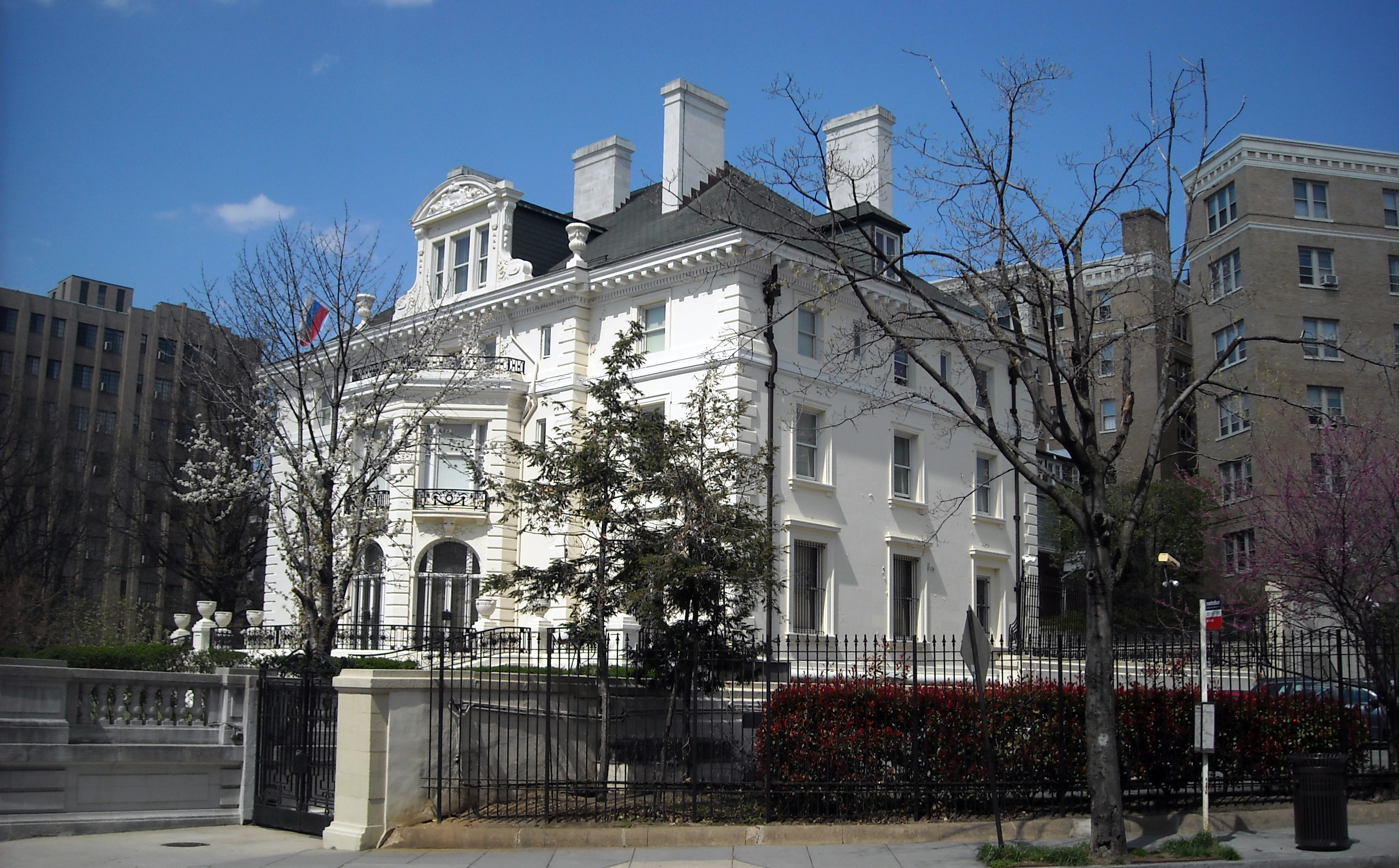
Trade Representative (Lothrop Mansion)

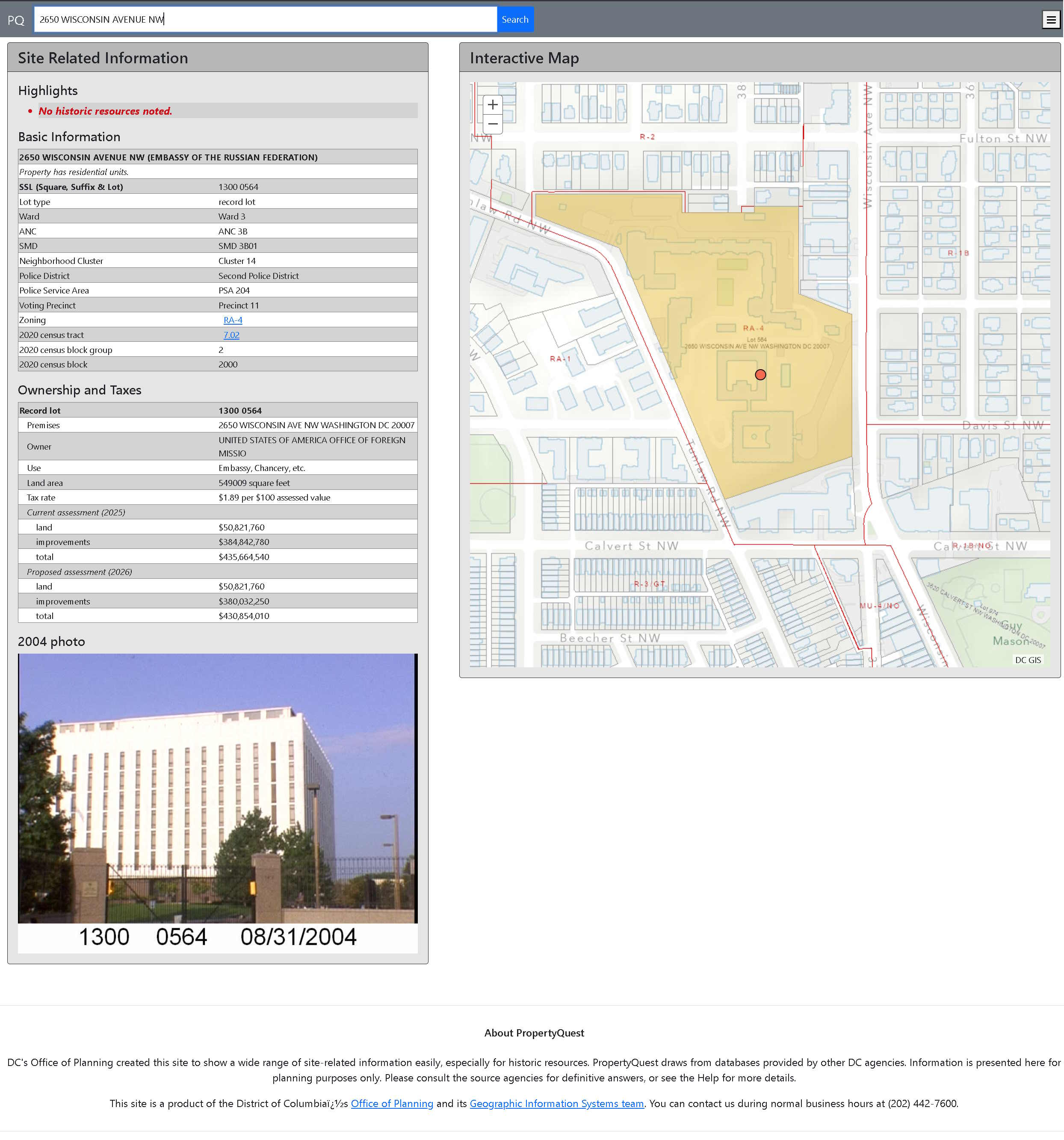
Embassy leased with U.S. OFM shown as land owner

== See also ==
- List of diplomatic missions of Russia
- List of ambassadors of Russia to the United States
- The Permanent Mission of the Russian Federation to the United Nations in New York
- Embassy of the United States, Moscow
- Russia–United States relations
- Soviet Union–United States relations
- Soviet Government Purchasing Commission in the U.S.
- Russian Embassy School in Washington, D.C.
- Russian ambassador's residence in Washington, D.C.
- Amtorg
