= Operation Easy Chair =

1951 covert operation

Operation Easy Chair was a joint covert operation of the US Central Intelligence Agency, the Dutch Internal Security Service (BVD), and the Dutch Radar Laboratory (NRP). The goal of the operation was to place a covert listening device in the office of the Russian Ambassador in The Hague. Named for a bug the CIA claimed to have found in a chair, the operation was a response to the discovery in 1951 of The Thing, a passive covert listening device discovered in the Great Seal gifted to the American embassy in Moscow by the Young Pioneer organization of the Soviet Union. The operation resulted in the creation of several devices, notably Easy Chair Mark I (1955), Mark II (1956), Mark III (1958), Mark IV (1961) and Mark V (1962). Although initially they could not get the resonant cavity microphone to work reliably, the research led to the development of several products involving passive elements for the CIA. In 1965, the NRP finally got a reliably working pulsed cavity resonator, but by that time the CIA was no longer interested in passive devices, largely because of the high levels of RF energy involved.

On 10 April 1987, the Soviets held a press conference and revealed that their embassy in Washington had been bugged by the Americans. The image of the bug has been identified by Crypto Museum, a Netherlands-based private museum of espionage technology, as an SRT-56, a bug developed by NRP, speculated to be part of the Easy Chair program.
