= Russian ambassador's residence in Washington, D.C. =

- The Russian ambassador's residence
- U.S. Historic district – Contributing property
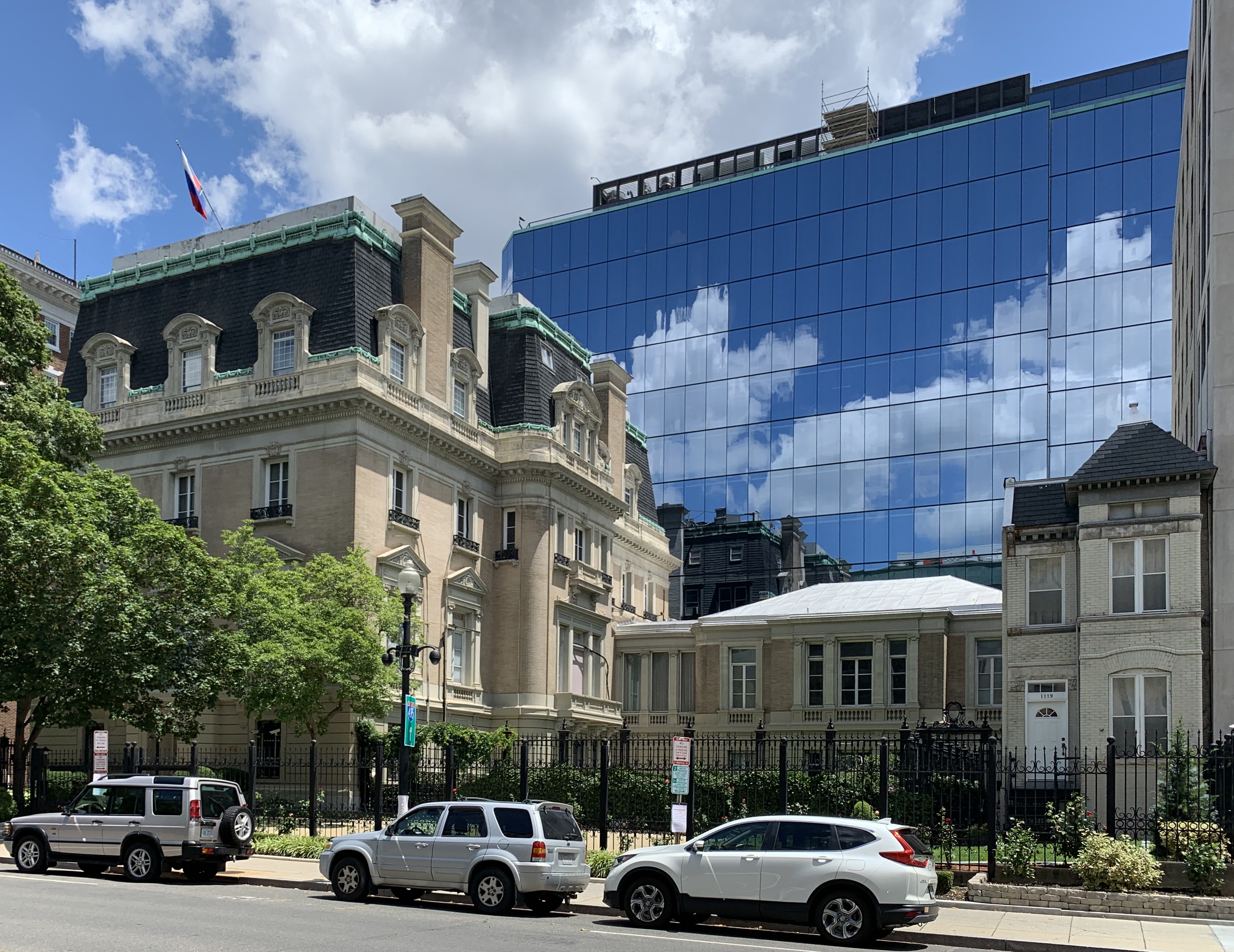
- Russian ambassador's residence in 2020
- Location: 1125 16th Street NW; Washington, D.C.
- Coordinates: 38.90459°N 77.03616°W
- Built: 1910
- Architectural style: Beaux-Arts
- Part of: Sixteenth Street Historic District
- Added to NRHP: 1978

The Russian ambassador's residence in Washington, D.C. historically known as the Mrs. George Pullman House, is a Beaux-Arts building located at 1125 16th Street Northwest, Washington, D.C. in the Downtown neighborhood. Prior to becoming the Russian ambassador's residence, it served as the Russian Empire Embassy and then the Soviet Union Embassy until 1979 when the embassy began its transition to its current location on Wisconsin Avenue.

The building is designated as a contributing property to the Sixteenth Street Historic District. It is listed on the National Register of Historic Places, and was listed on the District of Columbia Inventory of Historic Sites on 8 November 1964.

== History ==
Built in 1910 to the designs of architectural firm Wyeth & Sullivan, the building is three and a half stories high and is made of brick bearing walls with steel floor and roofing members. The building permit estimated the cost at $125,000, whereas the completed house ended up costing $361,000 in 1910.

The building was built at the request of Mrs. George Pullman for her daughter Florence Pullman, who was married to Illinois House Representative Frank O. Lowden. Due to Frank Lowden's deteriorating health he left Washington in the spring of 1911, and Mrs. Florence Pullman - who never moved into the house - sold it in 1913 to her friend Natalie Hammond.

In 1913 the house was sold to Russia for $350,000 to serve as the Russian Embassy during the reign of Nicholas II. Ambassador George Bakhmeteff became its first occupant.

From 1933 until 1979, the building served as the Soviet Union Embassy. In 1979, the embassy began its transition to its current location on Wisconsin Avenue. Since 1994, it has served as the residence for the Russian ambassador in Washington, D.C.

== Events ==
Beginning in 1970, a vigil was held there, over Jewish emigration from the Soviet Union.

In 1967, U.S. Navy communications specialist John Anthony Walker walked into the embassy. In 1980, Ronald Pelton, a National Security Agency communications analyst, walked into the Soviet Embassy.

In 1989, during glasnost, Tom Clancy among others were invited to receptions there.

In 1991, there was a protest over events in Lithuania.

== Gallery ==
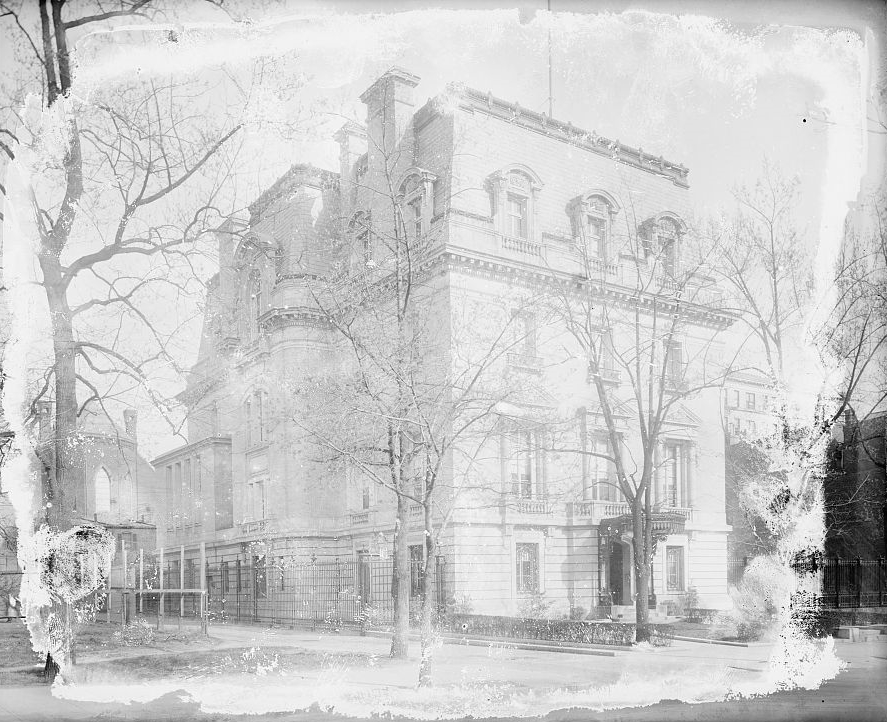
Photo taken between 1919-1920

Flying the Soviet Union flag

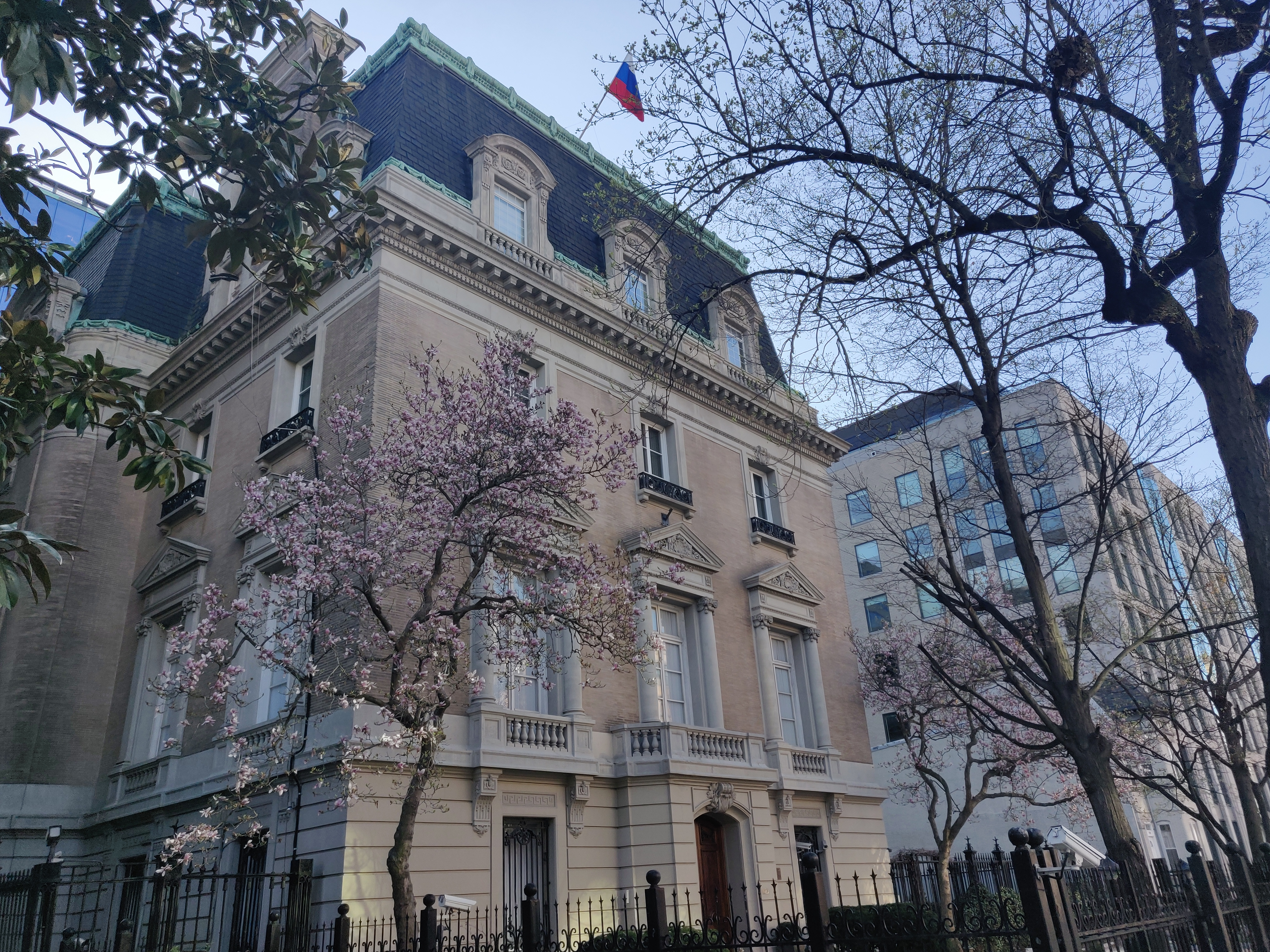
Flying the Russian flag

== See also ==
- Embassy of Russia, Washington, D.C.
- List of diplomatic missions of Russia
- List of ambassadors of Russia to the United States
