= Horst Schwirkmann =

German engineer

Horst Schwirkmann was an engineer who was responsible for discovering Soviet KGB bugs and recording devices planted in the West German embassy in Moscow during the Cold War.

His practise of neutralising electronic bugs by administering an immense voltage through it, causing great aural pain to anybody listening to the clandestine device, was said to have angered Soviet officials to the point that in 1964 he was shot in the buttocks with a nitrogen-based mustard gas capsule while admiring religious relics at the Troitse-Sergiyeva Lavra in Zagorsk, outside Moscow. The attack, though excruciatingly painful, failed to kill Schwirkmann.
