= The Thing (listening device) =

Audio bug to spy on US embassy in Moscow

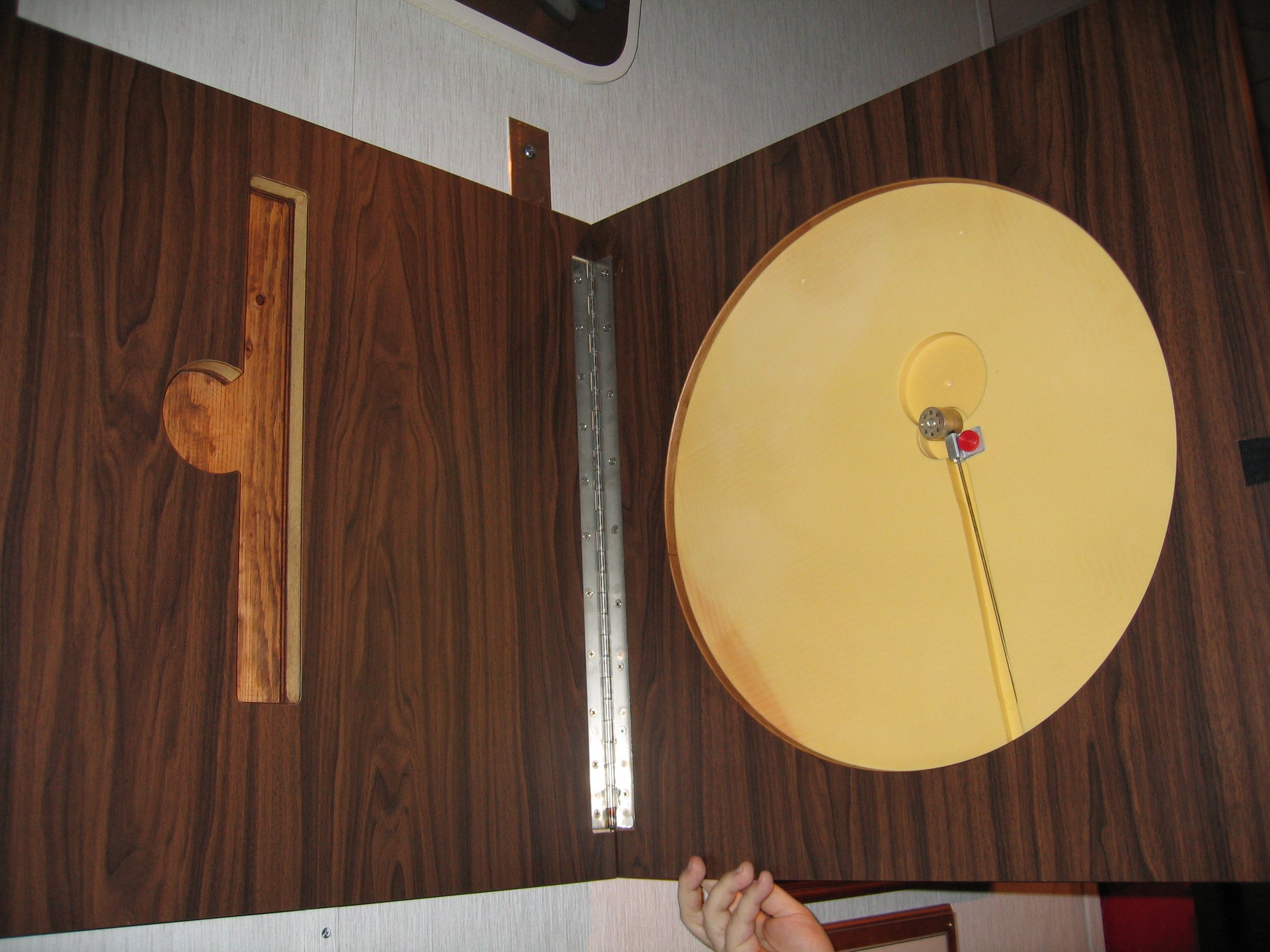
Replica of The Thing which contained a Soviet bugging device, on display at the NSA's National Cryptologic Museum

The Thing, also known as the Great Seal bug, was one of the first covert listening devices (or "bugs") to use passive techniques to transmit an audio signal. It was concealed inside a gift given by the Soviet Union to W. Averell Harriman, the United States Ambassador to the Soviet Union, on August 4, 1945. Because it was passive, needing electromagnetic energy from an outside source to become energized and active, it is considered a predecessor of radio-frequency identification (RFID) technology.

The Thing consisted of a tiny capacitive membrane connected to a small quarter-wavelength antenna; it had no power supply or active electronic components. The device, a passive cavity resonator, became active only when a radio signal of the correct frequency was sent to the device from an external transmitter. This is referred to in National Security Agency (NSA) parlance as "illuminating" a passive device. Sound waves (from voices inside the ambassador's office) passed through the thin wood case, striking the membrane and causing it to vibrate. The movement of the membrane varied the capacitance "seen" by the antenna, which in turn modulated the radio waves that struck and were re-transmitted by The Thing. A receiver demodulated the signal so that sound picked up by the microphone could be heard, just as an ordinary radio receiver demodulates radio signals and outputs sound.

Its design made the listening device very difficult to detect, because it was very small, had no power supply or active electronic components, and did not radiate any signal unless it was actively being irradiated remotely. These same design features, along with the overall simplicity of the device, made it very reliable and gave it a potentially unlimited operational life.

== Design ==
The device consisted of a 9-inch-long (23 cm) monopole antenna (quarter-wave for 330 megahertz frequencies, but it was also able to act as half-wave [at 660 MHz] or full-wave [at 1320 MHz]; the accounts differ. Given the radio technology of the time, the frequency of 330 MHz is most likely, equivalent to a wavelength of 91 cm). It used a straight rod, led through an insulating bushing into a cavity, where it was terminated with a round disc that formed one plate of a capacitor. The cavity was a high-Q round silver-plated copper "can", with the internal diameter of 0.775 in (19.05 mm) and 11/16 in (17.5 mm) long, with inductance of 10 nanohenries. Its front side was closed with a very thin (3 thou, or 75 micrometers) and fragile conductive membrane. In the middle of the cavity was a mushroom-shaped flat-faced tuning post, with its top adjustable to make it possible to set the membrane-post distance; the membrane and the post formed a variable capacitor acting as a condenser microphone and providing amplitude modulation (AM), with parasitic frequency modulation (FM) for the re-radiated signal. The post had machined grooves and radial lines into its face, probably to provide channels for air flow to reduce pneumatic damping of the membrane. The antenna was capacitively coupled to the post via its disc-shaped end. The total weight of the unit, including the antenna, was 1.1 ounces (31 grams).

The length of the antenna and the dimensions of the cavity were engineered in order to make the re-broadcast signal a higher harmonic of the illuminating frequency.

The original device was located with the can under the beak of the eagle on the Great Seal presented to W. Averell Harriman (see below); accounts differ on whether holes were drilled into the beak to allow sound waves to reach the membrane. Other sources say the wood behind the beak was undrilled but thin enough to pass the sound, or that the hollowed space acted like a soundboard to concentrate the sound from the room onto the microphone.

== History ==
=== Creation ===
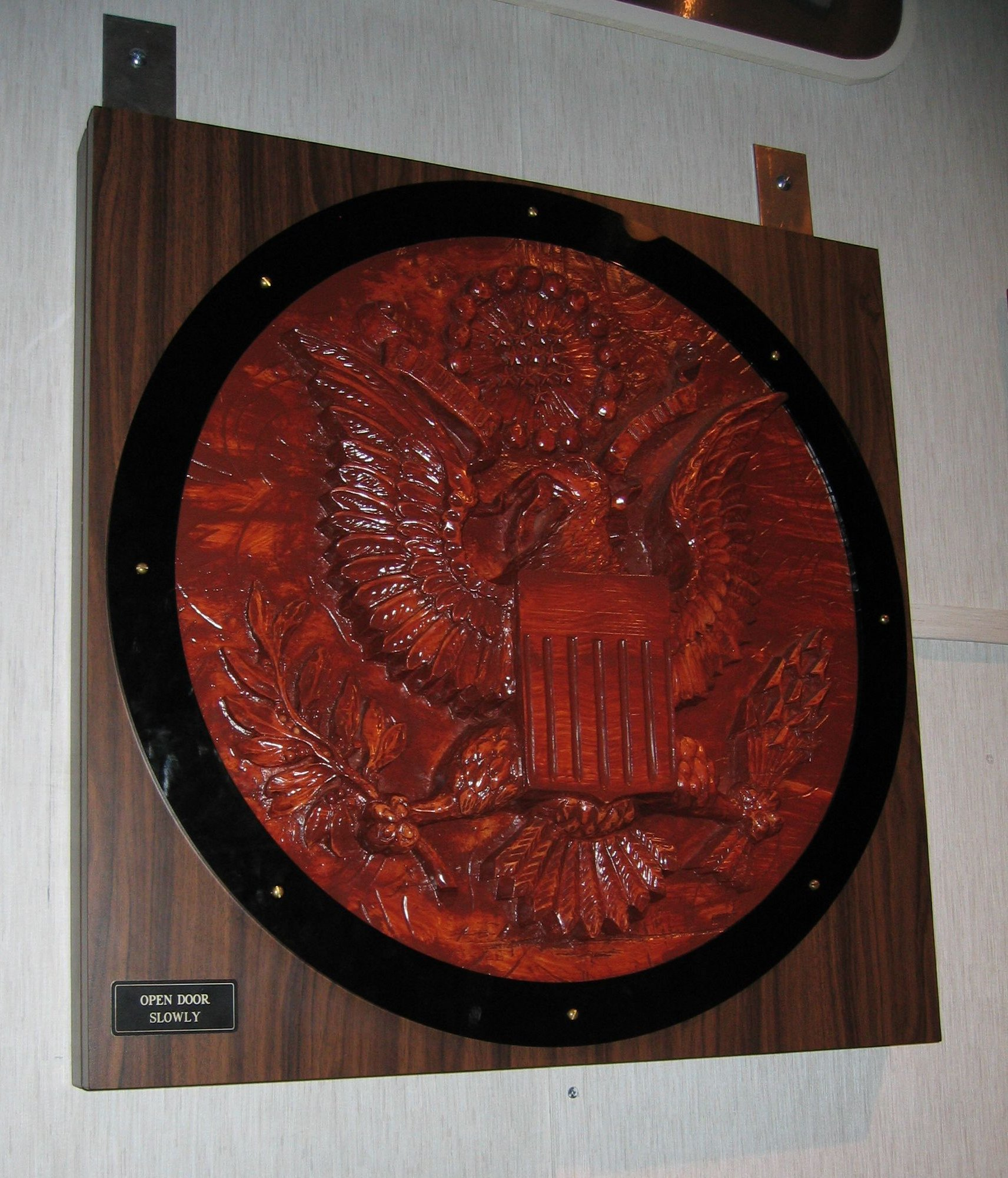
Replica of the Great Seal, on display at the NSA's National Cryptologic Museum

The Thing was designed by Soviet Russian inventor Leon Theremin, best known for his invention of the theremin, an electronic musical instrument. In Russian, the device is called Zlatoust (Златоуст) and belongs to a class of devices called endovibrators (эндовибраторы).

The device, embedded in a carved wooden plaque of the Great Seal of the United States, was used by the Soviet government to spy on the US. On August 4, 1945, several weeks before the end of World War II, a delegation from the Young Pioneer Organization of the Soviet Union presented the bugged carving to Ambassador Harriman, as a "gesture of friendship" to the Soviet Union's war ally. It hung in the ambassador's Moscow residential study at Spaso House for seven years, until it was exposed in 1952 during the tenure of Ambassador George F. Kennan.

=== Discovery ===
The existence of the bug was discovered accidentally in 1951 by a British radio operator at the British Embassy who overheard American conversations on an open Soviet Air Force radio channel as the Soviets were beaming radio waves at the ambassador's office. An American State Department employee was then able to reproduce the results using an untuned wideband receiver with a simple diode detector/demodulator, similar to some field strength meters.

Two additional State Department employees, John W. Ford and Joseph Bezjian, were sent to Moscow in March 1951 to investigate this and other suspected bugs in the British and Canadian embassy buildings. They conducted a countersurveillance sweep of the ambassador's office, using a signal generator and a receiver in a setup that generates audio feedback ("howl") if the sound from the room is transmitted on a given frequency. During this sweep, Bezjian found the device in the Great Seal carving.

The Federal Bureau of Investigation, Central Intelligence Agency, the Naval Research Laboratory and other U.S. agencies analyzed the device, along with assistance from the British government agency MI5 and the British Marconi Company. Marconi technician Peter Wright, a British scientist and later MI5 counterintelligence officer, ran the investigation. He was able to get The Thing working reliably with an illuminating frequency of 800 MHz. The generator which had discovered the device was tuned to 1800 MHz.

The membrane of The Thing was extremely thin, and was damaged during handling by the Americans; Wright had to replace it.

The simplicity of the device caused some initial confusion during its analysis; the antenna and resonator had several resonant frequencies in addition to its main one, and the modulation was partially both amplitude modulated and frequency modulated. The team also lost some time on an assumption that the distance between the membrane and the tuning post needed to be increased to increase resonance.

=== Aftermath ===
Wright's examination led to development of a similar British system codenamed SATYR, used throughout the 1950s by the British, Americans, Canadians and Australians.

There were later models of the device, some with more complex internal structure (the center post under the membrane attached to a helix, probably to increase the Q factor). Maximizing the Q factor was one of the engineering priorities, as this allowed higher selectivity to the illuminating signal frequency, and therefore increased operating distance and also higher acoustic sensitivity.

The CIA ran a secret research program at the Dutch Radar Laboratory (NRP) in Noordwijk in the Netherlands from 1954 to approximately 1967 to create its own covert listening devices based on a dipole antenna with a detector diode and a small microphone amplifier. The devices were developed under the Easy Chair research contract and were known as Easy Chair Mark I (1955), Mark II (1956), Mark III (1958), Mark IV (1961) and Mark V (1962). Although initially they could not get the resonant cavity microphone to work reliably, several products involving passive elements were developed for the CIA as a result of the research. In 1965, the NRP finally got a reliably working pulsed cavity resonator, but by that time the CIA was no longer interested in passive devices, largely because of the high levels of RF energy needed to activate them.

In May 1960, The Thing was mentioned on the fourth day of meetings in the United Nations Security Council, convened by the Soviet Union over the 1960 U-2 incident where a U.S. spy plane had entered their territory and been shot down. The U.S. ambassador Henry Cabot Lodge Jr. showed off the bugging device in the Great Seal to illustrate that spying incidents between the two nations were mutual and to allege that Nikita Khrushchev had magnified this particular incident as a pretext to abort the 1960 Paris Summit: "I produced a wooden carving of the Great Seal of the United States which was given by some Russians to the United States Ambassador to the Soviet Union and which hung in his office behind his desk, and which contained an electronic device which made it possible for persons on the outside possessing a certain type of technical device to hear everything that went on. I produced that as a piece of evidence, and it is direct, fresh, authentic evidence, to show the effectiveness and the thoroughness of Soviet espionage."

== Replica ==
In 2025, John Little, a 79-year-old specialist in counter surveillance, built a functioning replica of The Thing as part of his long standing research into covert listening devices. A documentary about his reconstruction premiered in May 2025 and was scheduled for public screening at the National Museum of Computing in September of the same year.

== See also ==
- Australia–Timor-Leste spying scandal
- Laser microphone
- Moscow Signal
- Nonlinear junction detector
- Ragemaster
- Soviet espionage in the United States
- Telstar Mechta
- TEMPEST
- Trojan Horse
- Project GUNMAN
