= Covert listening device =

Surveillance device

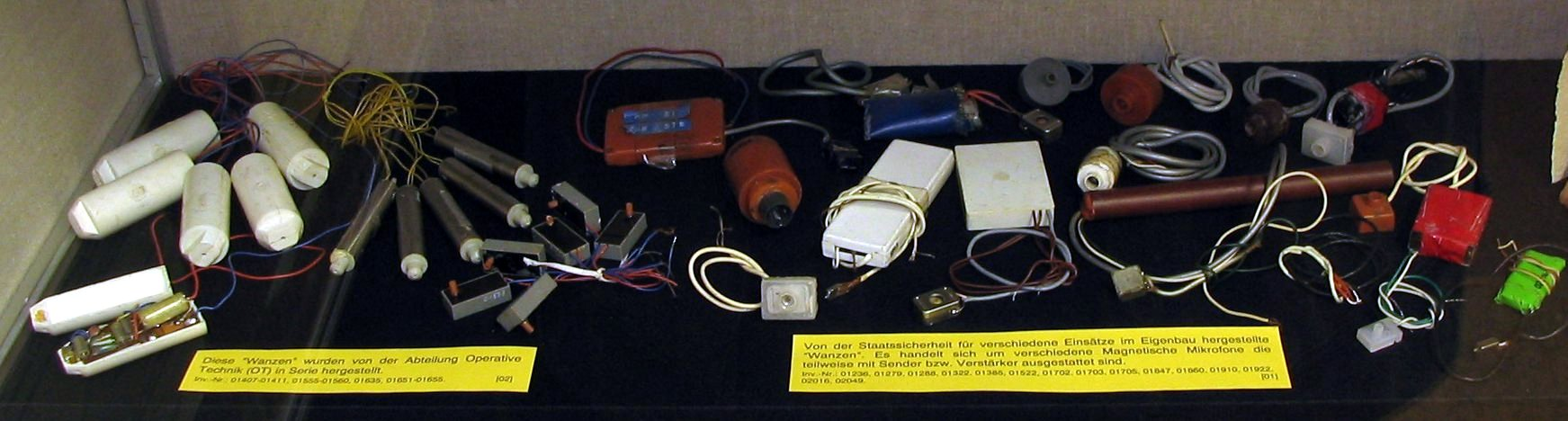
Listening devices of the East German security services

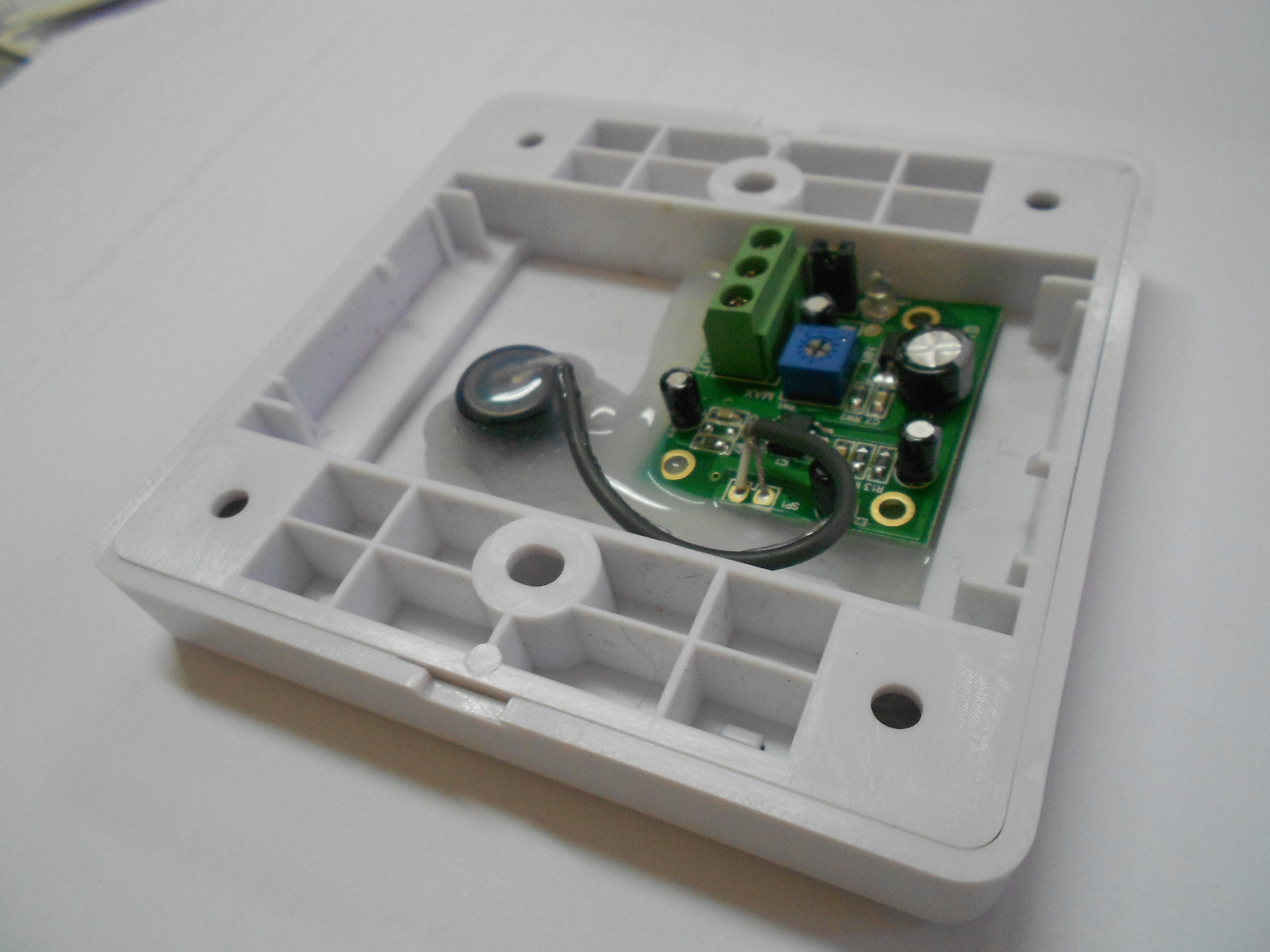
A microphone disguised as a power outlet plate

A covert listening device, commonly known as a bug or a wire, is usually a combination of a miniature radio transmitter with a microphone. The use of bugs, called bugging, or wiretapping is a common technique in surveillance, espionage and police investigations.

Self-contained electronic covert listening devices came into common use with intelligence agencies in the 1950s, when technology allowed for a suitable transmitter to be built into a relatively small package. By 1956, the US Central Intelligence Agency was designing and building "Surveillance Transmitters" that employed transistors, which greatly reduced the size and power consumption. With no moving parts and greater power efficiency, these solid-state devices could be operated by small batteries, which revolutionized the process of covert listening.

A bug does not have to be a device specifically designed for the purpose of eavesdropping. For instance, with the right equipment, it is possible to remotely activate the microphone of cellular phones, even when a call is not being made, to listen to conversations in the vicinity of the phone.

== Dictograph ==
Among the earliest covert listening devices used in the United States of America was the dictograph, an invention of Kelley M. Turner. It consisted of a microphone in one location and a remote listening post with a speaker that could also be recorded using a phonograph. While also marketed as a device that allowed broadcasting of sounds, or dictating text from one room to a typist in another, it was used in several criminal investigations.

== "Wearing a wire" ==
A "wire" is a device that is hidden or concealed under a person's clothes for the purpose of covertly listening to conversations in proximity to the wearer. Wires are typically used in police sting operations in order to gather information about suspects. The wire device transmits to a remote location where law enforcement agents monitor what is being said.

The act of "wearing a wire" refers to a person knowingly recording the conversation or transmitting the contents of a conversation to a police listening post. Usually, some sort of device is attached to the body in an inconspicuous way, such as taping a microphone wire to their chest. Undercover agents "wearing a wire" is a typical plot element in gangster and police-related movies and television shows. A stereotypical scene might include an individual being suspected by criminals of wearing a hidden microphone, and having their shirt torn open to reveal the deception.

When infiltrating a criminal organization, a mole may be given a wire to wear under their clothes.

Wearing a wire is viewed as risky, since discovery could lead to violence against the mole or other retaliatory responses.

== Remotely activated mobile phone microphones ==
Mobile phone (cell phone) microphones can be activated remotely, without any need for physical access. This "roving bug" feature has been used by law enforcement agencies and intelligence services to listen in on nearby conversations. A United States court ruled in 1988 that a similar technique used by the FBI against reputed former Gulfport, Mississippi, cocaine dealers after having obtained a court order was permissible. Not only microphones but also seemingly innocuous motion sensors, which can be accessed by third-party apps on Android and iOS devices without any notification to the user, are a potential eavesdropping channel in smartphones. With the Covid-19 pandemic came an increase in remote work spurring on a new advent of Employee Monitoring Software which remotely collects many forms of data from laptops and smartphones issued by employers, including webcam and microphone data, raising concerns that a new era of corporate spying has shifted the power balance between workers and businesses.

== Automobile computer systems ==
In 2003, the FBI obtained a court order to surreptitiously listen in on conversations in a car through the car's built-in emergency and tracking security system. A panel of the 9th Circuit Court of Appeals prohibited the use of this technique because it involved deactivating the system's security features.

== Audio from optical sources ==
A laser microphone can be used to reconstruct audio from a laser beam shot onto an object in a room, or the glass pane of a window.

Researchers have also prototyped a method for reconstructing audio from video of thin objects that can pick up sound vibrations, such as a houseplant or bag of potato chips.

== Examples of use ==
=== In embassies ===
Embassies and other diplomatic posts are often the targets of bugging operations.

- The Great Seal bug was hidden in a copy of the Great Seal of the United States, presented by the Soviet Union to the United States ambassador in Moscow in 1946 and only discovered in 1952. The bug, called The Thing, was unusual in that it had no power source or active components, making it much harder to detect—it was a new type of device, called a passive resonant cavity bug. The cavity had a metallic diaphragm that moved in unison with sound waves from a conversation in the room. When illuminated by a radio beam from a remote location, the cavity would return a frequency modulated signal.
- The Soviet embassy in Ottawa was bugged by the Government of Canada and MI5 during its construction in 1956.
- Having learned from The Thing passive resonant cavity bug, the Russian Embassy in The Hague was bugged by the BVD and the CIA in 1958 and 1959, using an Easy Chair Mark III listening device.
- Extensive bugging of the West German embassy in Moscow by the KGB was discovered by German engineer Horst Schwirkmann, leading to an attack on Schwirkmann in 1964.
- The United States Embassy in Moscow was bugged during its construction in the 1970s by Soviet agents posing as laborers. When discovered in the early 1980s, it was found that even the concrete columns were so riddled with bugs that the building eventually had to be torn down and replaced with a new one, built with US materials and labor.
- In 1984, bugs were discovered in at least 16 IBM Selectric typewriters in the US Embassy in Moscow and the US Consulate in Leningrad. The highly sophisticated devices were planted by the Soviets between 1976 and 1984 and were hidden inside a metal support bar. Information was intercepted by detecting the movements of metal bars inside the typewriter (the so-called latch interposers) by means of magnetometers. The data was then compressed and transmitted in bursts.
- In 1990, it was reported that the embassy of the People's Republic of China in Canberra, Australia, had been bugged by the Australian Secret Intelligence Service as part of the UKUSA Project Echelon.
- In 2003, the Pakistani embassy building in London was found bugged; contractors hired by MI5 had planted bugs in the building in 2001.

=== Other ===
- During World War II, the Nazis took over a Berlin brothel, Salon Kitty, and used concealed microphones to spy on patrons.
- Also during the war, the British used covert listening devices to monitor captured German fighter pilots and officers being held at Trent Park and other secure locations.
- On 6 December 1972, the Central Intelligence Agency placed a wire tap on a multiplex trunk line 24 kilometers southwest of Vinh to intercept Vietnamese communist messages concerning negotiating an end to the Vietnam War.
- The Watergate scandal in the 1970s.
- In the late 1970s, a bug was discovered in a meeting room at the OPEC headquarters in Vienna. The bug intercepted the audio from the PA system via a pickup coil and transmitted it on a frequency near 600 MHz using subcarrier audio masking. It was not discovered who was responsible for planting the bug.
- In 1984, Colin Thatcher, a Canadian politician, was secretly recorded making statements which would later be used to convict him of his wife's murder. The recording device was concealed on a person Thatcher had previously approached for help in the crime.
- Electronic bugging devices were found in March 2003 at offices used by French and German delegations at the European Union headquarters in Brussels. Devices were also discovered at offices used by other delegations. The discovery of the telephone tapping systems was first reported by Le Figaro newspaper, which blamed the US.
- In 1999, the US expelled a Russian diplomat, accusing him of using a listening device in a top floor conference room used by diplomats in the United States Department of State headquarters.
- In 2001, the government of the People's Republic of China announced that it had discovered twenty-seven bugs in a Boeing 767 purchased as an official aircraft of the General Secretary of the Chinese Communist Party, Jiang Zemin.
- In 2003, Alastair Campbell (who was Director of Communications and Strategy from 1997 to 2003 for the British Prime Minister) in his memoirs The Blair Years: The Alastair Campbell Diaries alleged that two bugs were discovered in the hotel room meant for visiting Prime Minister Tony Blair planted by Indian intelligence agencies. The alleged bug discovery was at a hotel during Blair's official visit to New Delhi in 2001. Security services supposedly informed him that the bugs could not be removed without drilling the wall and therefore he changed to another room.
- In 2004, a bug was found in a meeting room at the United Nations offices in Geneva.
- In 2008, it was reported that an electric samovar presented to Elizabeth II in about 1968 by a Soviet aerobatic team was removed from Balmoral Castle as a security precaution in case it contained a listening device.

== Listening devices and the UK law ==
The use of listening devices is permitted under UK law providing that they are used in compliance with Data Protection and Human Rights laws. If a government body or organisation intends to use listening or recording devices they must follow the laws put in place by the Regulation of Investigatory Powers Act (RIPA). It is usually permitted to record audio covertly in a public setting or one's own home.

=== Legal requirements of listening and recording device use ===
It is illegal to use listening or recording devices that are not permitted for public use. Individuals may only use listening or recording devices within reasonable privacy laws for legitimate security and safety reasons. Many people use listening devices on their own property to capture evidence of excessive noise in a neighbour complaint, which is legal in normal circumstances.

=== Legal use of listening and recording devices ===
It is legal to use listening or recording devices in public areas, in an office or business area, or in one's own home. Many people use listening devices to record evidence or to take notes for their own reference.

=== Illegal use of listening and recording devices ===
It is illegal to use listening devices on certain Military band and Air Band UHF and FM frequencies - people in the past who have not followed this law have been fined over £10,000. This is because the use of a radio transmission bug that transmits on restricted frequencies contravenes the Telecommunications Act and is illegal. It is also against the law to place a listening or recording device in someone else's home. Due to privacy and human rights laws, using a listening or recording device to intrude on the reasonable expectation of privacy of an individual is highly illegal, i.e. placing gadgets in someone's home or car to which one does not have permitted access, or in a private area such as a bathroom.

== United States Law on Listening Devices ==
=== Federal laws on Listening Devices ===
Several federal laws were passed by congress that apply nation-wide. Under Title 18 of the US Code § 2251 2(iii)(c) at least one of the parties involved in the communication must have given consent to interception of the communication. This title applies to wire, oral, or any kind of electric communication. This single party consent only applies if one of the parties is an "officer of the United States" (Title 18 of the US Code § 2251 [2d]). Furthermore, congress passed the Electronic Communications Privacy Act of 1986 (ECPA). This act updated the Federal Wiretap Act of 1968. The Federal Wiretap act addressed the interception of conversations over telephone lines, but not interception of computer or other digital data. This act was further updated by the USA Patriot Act to clarify and modernize the ECPA. The ECPA has three title. Title I prohibits attempted or successful interception of or "procure[ment] [of] any other person to intercept or endeavor to intercept any wire, oral, or electronic communication." It also prohibits the storage of any information obtained via phone calls without consent or illegally obtained though wiretaps. Furthermore, the US passed the Wiretap Act which prohibits unauthorized interception of "wire, oral, or electronic communications" by the government or by private citizens. Furthermore, this act establishes the procedure for government officials to obtain warrants to authorize any wiretapping activates. Such laws were passed in response to congressional investigations that found extensive cases of government and private wiretapping without consent or legal authorization. In the US, electronic surveillance is seen as protected under the Constitution that the Fourth Amendment, which protects against unreasonable search and seizure by the government, which also is seen by the Supreme Court of the United States as electronic surveillance.

=== State to State variation ===
Listening devices are regulated by several legislative bodies in the United States. Laws on listening devices varies between states within the US. Typically the variation comes on whether or not the state is a one or two party consent state. Within one party consent states, only one party must approve the recording, whereas in all party consent states all parties must consent to the recording. In many states, the consent requirements listed below only apply to situations where the parties have a reasonable expectation of privacy, such as private property, and do not apply in public areas. (Protection can apply to conversations in public areas in some circumstances.)

Parties required to give consent by state
One-party Consent States	All-Party Consent States
Alabama	California
Alaska	Connecticut
Arizona	Delaware
Arkansas	Florida
Colorado	Illinois
District of Columbia (D.C.)	Maryland
Georgia	Massachusetts
Hawaii	Michigan
Idaho	Montana
Indiana	Nevada
Iowa	New Hampshire
Kansas	Oregon
Kentucky	Pennsylvania
Louisiana	Vermont
Maine	Washington
Minnesota	
Mississippi
Missouri
Nebraska
New Jersey
New Mexico
New York
North Carolina
North Dakota
Ohio
Oklahoma
Rhode Island
South Carolina
South Dakota
Tennessee
Texas
Utah
Virginia
West Virginia
Wisconsin
Wyoming

== See also ==
- Acoustic cryptanalysis
- Cellphone surveillance
- Communications interception
- Eavesdropping
- Electronic Privacy Information Center
- Espionage
- Greek telephone tapping case 2004-2005
- Mobile phone tracking
- National Cryptologic Museum
- Nonlinear junction detector
- Peter Wright
- Privacy
- Privacy International
- Surveillance
- Technical surveillance counter-measures
- Telephone tapping
- TEMPEST
- Vault 7 § Part 6 – "Weeping Angel"
- Watergate scandal
