= Hyde House =

Hyde House may refer to:

in the United Kingdom (by county)

- Hyde House (Buckinghamshire), an early 18th-century Grade II listed house in Hyde Heath, Buckinghamshire
- Hyde House (Dorset), a Grade II listed house on Purbeck, in Dorset
- Hyde House (Essex), a Grade II listed house in Layer-de-la-Haye, Colchester, Essex
- Hyde House (Gloucestershire), a Grade II listed house in Minchinhampton, Stroud, Gloucestershire
- Hyde House (Hampshire), a Grade II* listed house in Winchester, Hampshire
- Hyde House (Herefordshire), a Grade II listed house in Woolhope, Herefordshire
- Hyde House (Lambeth), a mid 19th-century Grade II listed house in Lambeth

in the United States (by state then city)

- Hyde Mountain Lookout House, Camp Wood, Arizona, listed on the National Register of Historic Places (NRHP) in Yavapai County, Arizona
- Mathis-Hyde House, Augusta, Arkansas, listed on the NRHP in Woodruff County, Arkansas
- Hyde House (Visalia, California), listed on the NRHP in Tulare County, California
- Hyde-St. John House, Hartford, Connecticut, listed on the NRHP in Hartford, Connecticut
- William A. Hyde House, Pocatello, Idaho, listed on the NRHP in Bannock County, Idaho
- Hyde Mansion, Bath, Maine, listed on the NRHP in Sagadahoc County, Maine
- Chase-Hyde Farm, Fall River, Massachusetts, NRHP-listed
- Hyde House (Lee, Massachusetts), NRHP-listed, in Berkshire County, Massachusetts
- Hyde House (Newton, Massachusetts), NRHP-listed, in Middlesex County, Massachusetts
- Eleazer Hyde House, Newton, Massachusetts, NRHP-listed
- Gershom Hyde House, Newton, Massachusetts
- Hyde House (Glens Falls, New York), NRHP-listed, in Warren County, New York
- Hyde Hall, Springfield Center, New York, NRHP-listed
- Horner-Hyde House, Pierre, South Dakota, listed on the NRHP in Hughes County, South Dakota
- Hyde Buildings, Pierre, South Dakota, listed on the NRHP in Hughes County, South Dakota
- Hartwell B. Hyde House, Triune, Tennessee, listed on the NRHP in Williamson County, Tennessee
- Hyde Log Cabin, Grand Isle, Vermont, NRHP-listed in Grand Isle County, Vermont
- Samuel Hyde House, Seattle, Washington, NRHP-listed in King County, Washington
