= Newton Jordan House =

Historic house in Tennessee, United States

- U.S. National Register of Historic Places
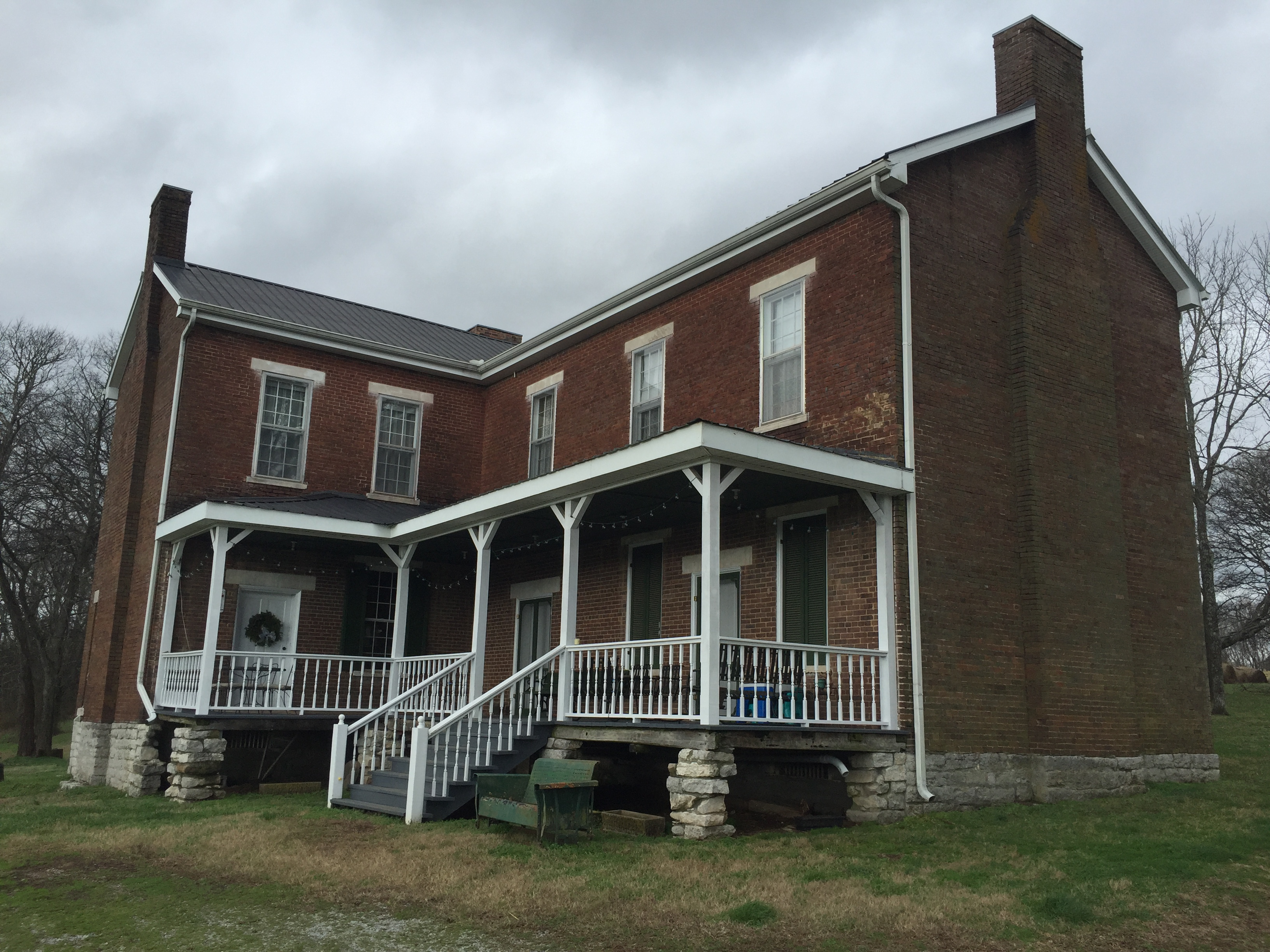

- Location within Tennessee Location within the United States
- Location: New Rd. 1 mi. E of US Alt. 41, Triune, Tennessee
- Coordinates: 35.83419°N 86.64508°W
- Area: 1 acre (0.40 ha)
- Built: c. 1830 and c. 1900
- Architectural style: Central passage plan
- MPS: Williamson County MRA
- NRHP reference No.: 88000298
- Added to NRHP: April 13, 1988

The Newton Jordan House is a property in Triune, Tennessee, United States, that was listed on the National Register of Historic Places in 1988. It was built, remodelled, or has other significance in c. 1830 and c. 1900. It includes Central passage plan and other architecture. When listed the property included three contributing buildings on an area of 1 acre (0.40 ha).

William Jordan was an early settler of the Triune area. He and Hartwell Hyde arrived in 1810. Jordan's log home is the location of the Newton Jordan House. The Hartwell B. Hyde House also survives and is NRHP-listed. The property is also denoted as Williamson County historic resource WM-259.

== Gallery ==
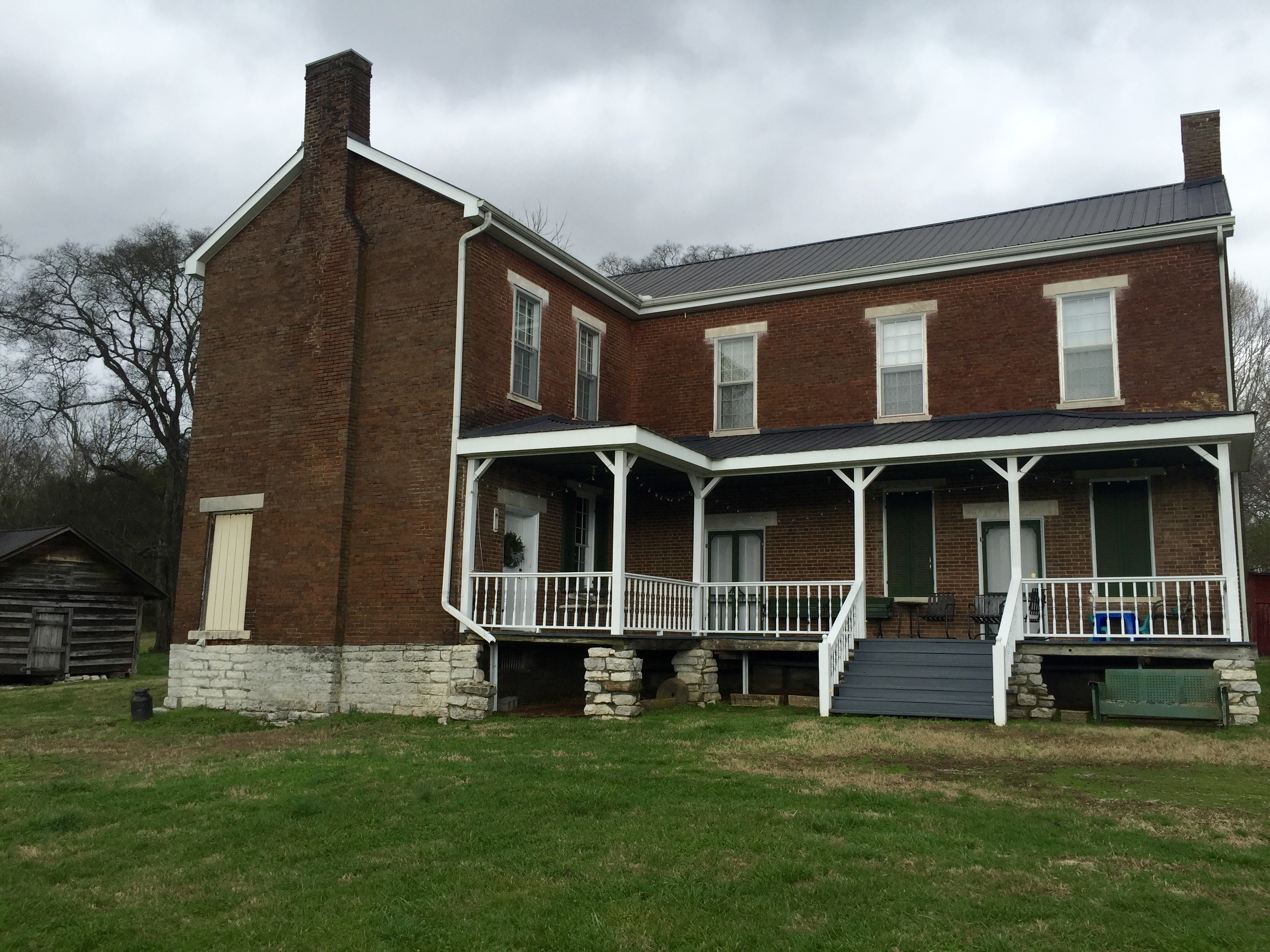
Front View

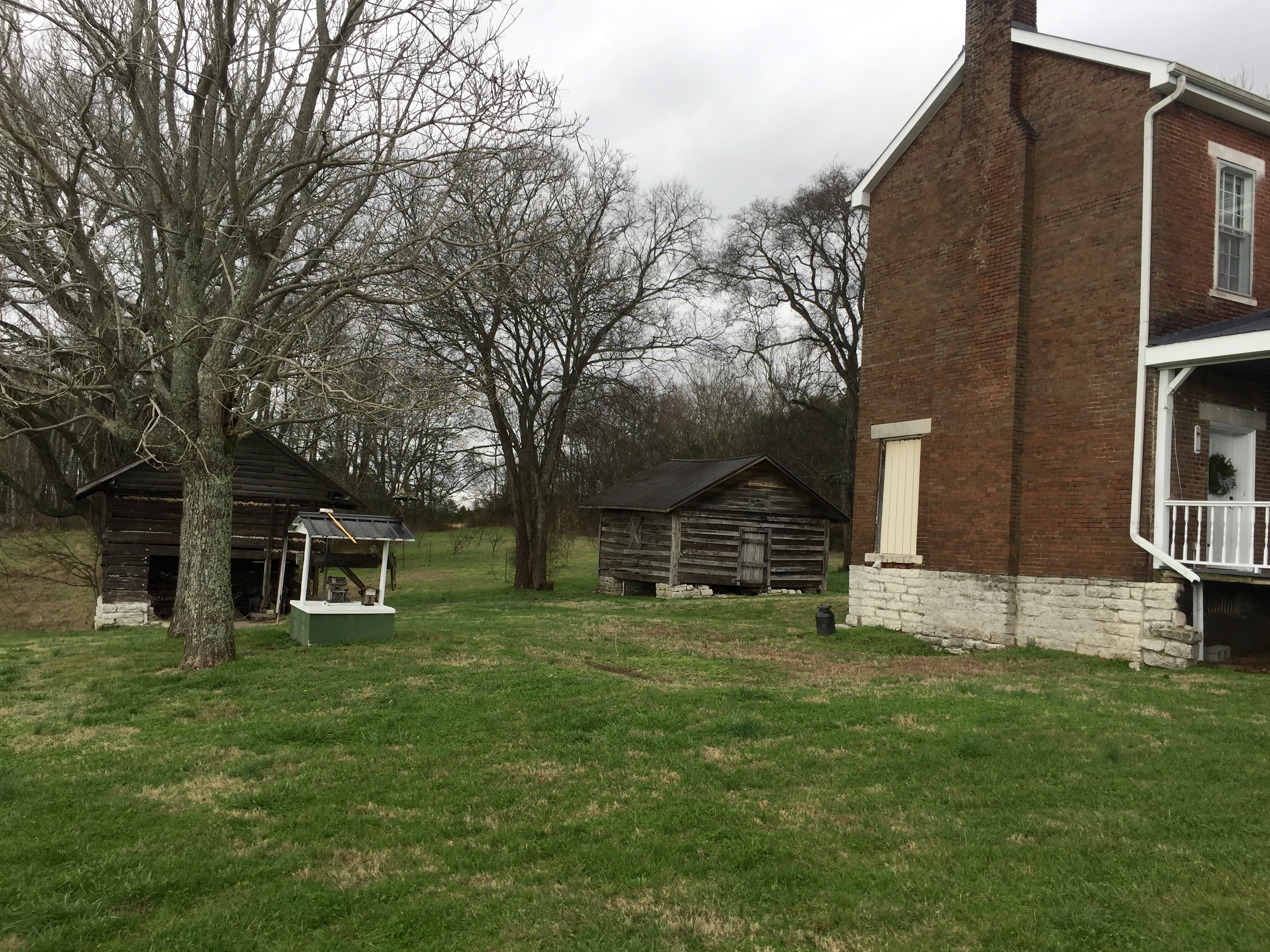
Side View
