= Consulate General of Russia, Seattle =

Former diplomatic mission of Russia in USA (Seattle, Washington)

Former Consulate General of the Russian Federation in Seattle
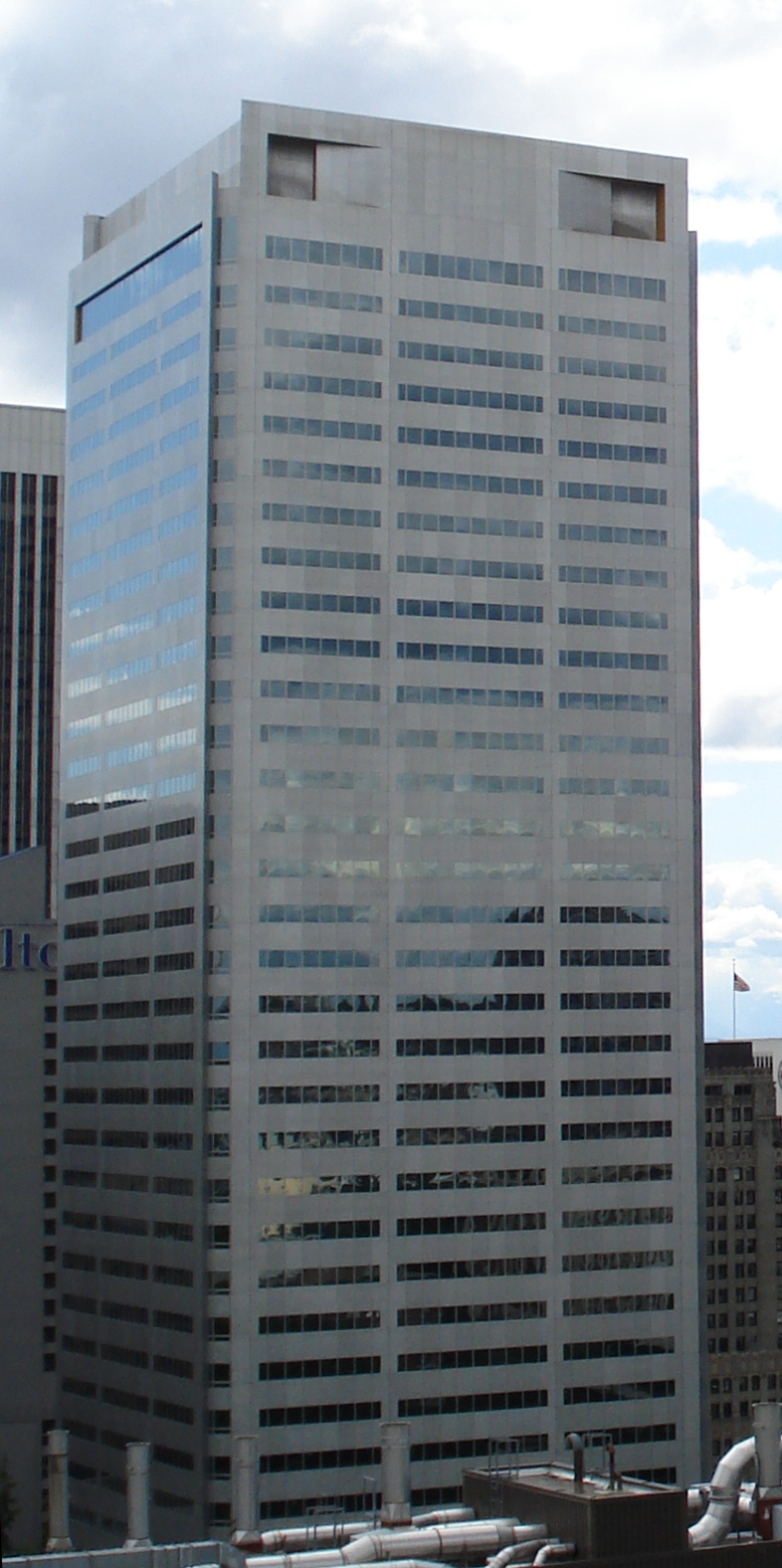
- Location: Seattle
- Address: 600 University Street, 25th floor, #2510; One Union Square; Seattle, WA 98101
- Coordinates: 47.60983°N 122.33212°W
- Opened: December 1992
- Closed: March 30, 2018
- Consul General: Valery Petrovich Timashov (prior to closing in 2018)
- Website: seattle.mid.ru

The Consulate General of Russia in Seattle was Russia's diplomatic office in Seattle, Washington that was operated by the Russian Ministry of Foreign Affairs from December 1992 until 2018. At the time of its opening it was the third consulate Russia had in the USA. The Consul General of Seattle resided in Samuel Hyde House.

Prior to its closure in 2018, the facility served Alaska, Idaho, Iowa, Minnesota, Montana, Nebraska, North Dakota, South Dakota, Washington, Wisconsin and Wyoming. The consulate assisted with the processing of passports, visas, and other officials docs.

== History ==
=== Russian Empire ===
The first Russian Empire consul general in Seattle was Nicholas Bogoyavlensky who began his work as consul in 1914 and received his exequatur on May 26, 1915. The consulate was tasked with purchasing food from the US during World War I. The consulate was also responsible for Russian subjects and affairs in Washington, Oregon, Idaho, Montana, and Alaska, and was under the jurisdiction of the San Francisco Consulate.

After the October Revolution, Bogoyavlensky asked Arthur-Karl Landesen, who had been vice-consul at the Russian Consulate General in Harbin 1914–1921, to take over consular duties in San Francisco, which Landesen did until the US recognition of the Soviet Union in 1933.

On November 16, 1933, the Seattle consulate was closed and Bogoyavlensky's status as consul general was terminated and his exequatur revoked by Acting Secretary William Phillips due to the signing of the Roosevelt-Litvinov Agreement where the United States recognized the Soviet Union and diplomatic relations between the two countries began.

=== Russian Federation ===
The Consulate General of the Russian Federation in Seattle was opened in December 1992.

On March 26, 2018, the US government expelled 60 Russian diplomats, and on March 30, 2018, the US government closed the Seattle consulate.

As of early 2025 the US and Russian governments are in talks to reopening the consulate again.

== Consuls General of Russia in Seattle ==
Name	Date
Nicholas Vyacheslavovich Bogoyavlensky	1914–1933
Georgy Borisovich Vlaskin	1992–1998
Andrey Viktorovich Veklenko	1998–2002
Vladimir Ivanovich Volnov	2003–2008
Yuri Valentinovich Gerasin	2008–2012
Andrey K. Yushmanov	2012–2016
Valery Petrovich Timashov	2016–2018

== See also ==
- List of diplomatic missions of Russia
- List of ambassadors of Russia to the United States
- Samuel Hyde House

== Bibliography ==
- Bogdan, Nina (2021). Between Dreams and Reality: The Russian Diaspora in San Francisco, 1917-1957 (PDF) (Thesis). University of Arizona.
- Хисамутдинов, Амир Александрович (2016). "Русские американцы в Сиэтле". Гуманитарные исследования в Восточной Сибири и на Дальнем Востоке (in Russian). 37 (3): 30–36. eISSN 2076-8575.
