= Hyde Avenue Historic District =

Historic district in Massachusetts, United States

- U.S. National Register of Historic Places
- U.S. Historic district
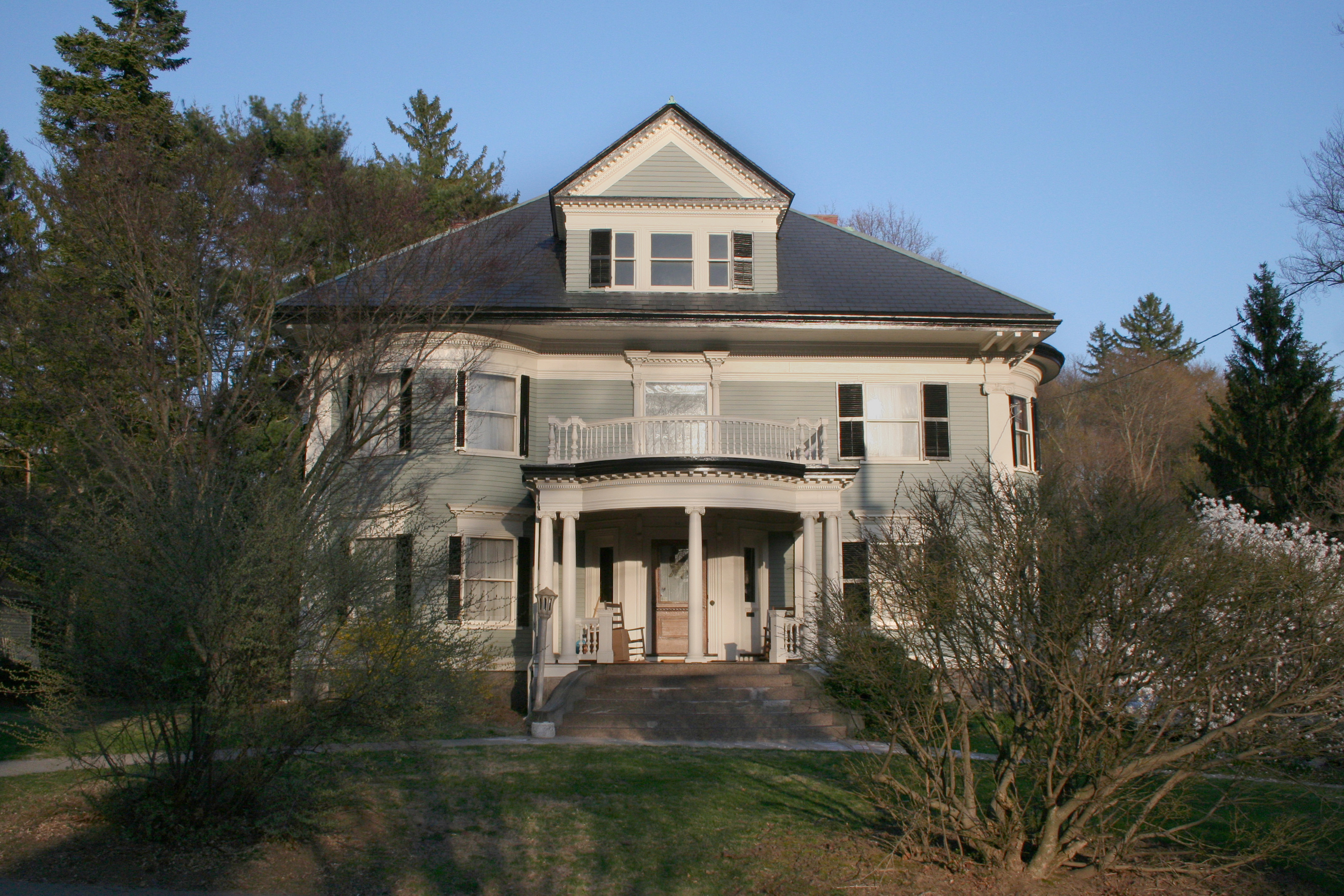

- Location within Massachusetts Location within the United States
- Location: 36, 42, 52, 59, and 62 Hyde Ave., Newton, Massachusetts
- Coordinates: 42°20′54″N 71°11′10″W
- Architectural style: Colonial Revival, Queen Anne, Shingle Style
- MPS: Newton MRA
- NRHP reference No.: 86001742
- Added to NRHP: December 23, 1986

The Hyde Avenue Historic District is a residential historic district encompassing the stylistic range of houses being built in the Newton Corner area of Newton, Massachusetts in the 1880s. It includes the five houses at 36, 42, 52, 59, and 62 Hyde Avenue, The district was added to the National Register of Historic Places in 1986.

Hyde Avenue is a residential side street on the south side of Newton Corner, connecting Centre Street and Sargent Street, with a ninety degree turn about one third of the way from Centre Street. At the point of this turn is a slightly enlarged loop around a small grassy area. Four of the five houses are on the east side of Hyde Avenue running south from this turn, while the fifth is at the southwest junction of Hyde Avenue and Garden Road, another minor residential street. The houses at 36 and 52 Hyde Avenue are Queen Anne in their styling, and were built in 1880 and c. 1893, respectively. The houses at 59 and 62 Hyde are Colonial Revival, and were built c. 1885 and c. 1895. The fifth house, 42 Hyde, is a Shingle style house built in 1885. The Hyde Avenue area was originally part of a 43-acre (17 ha) farm, which was subdivided and mostly sold off by George Hyde, a city assessor, selectman, and bank director.

The house at 36 Hyde, while somewhat boxy, has a wealth of Queen Anne styling, including an asymmetrically sited entry, decorative wood shingling, and spindled friezes on its porch. 42 Hyde, the only Shingle style house, has an arcaded wraparound porch and conical dormers. The Colonial Revival house at 62 Hyde has a porch entry with clustered columns.

== See also ==
- Hyde House (Newton, Massachusetts), George Hyde's family homestead
- National Register of Historic Places listings in Newton, Massachusetts
