= Hyde House (Newton, Massachusetts) =

Historic house in Massachusetts, United States

- U.S. National Register of Historic Places
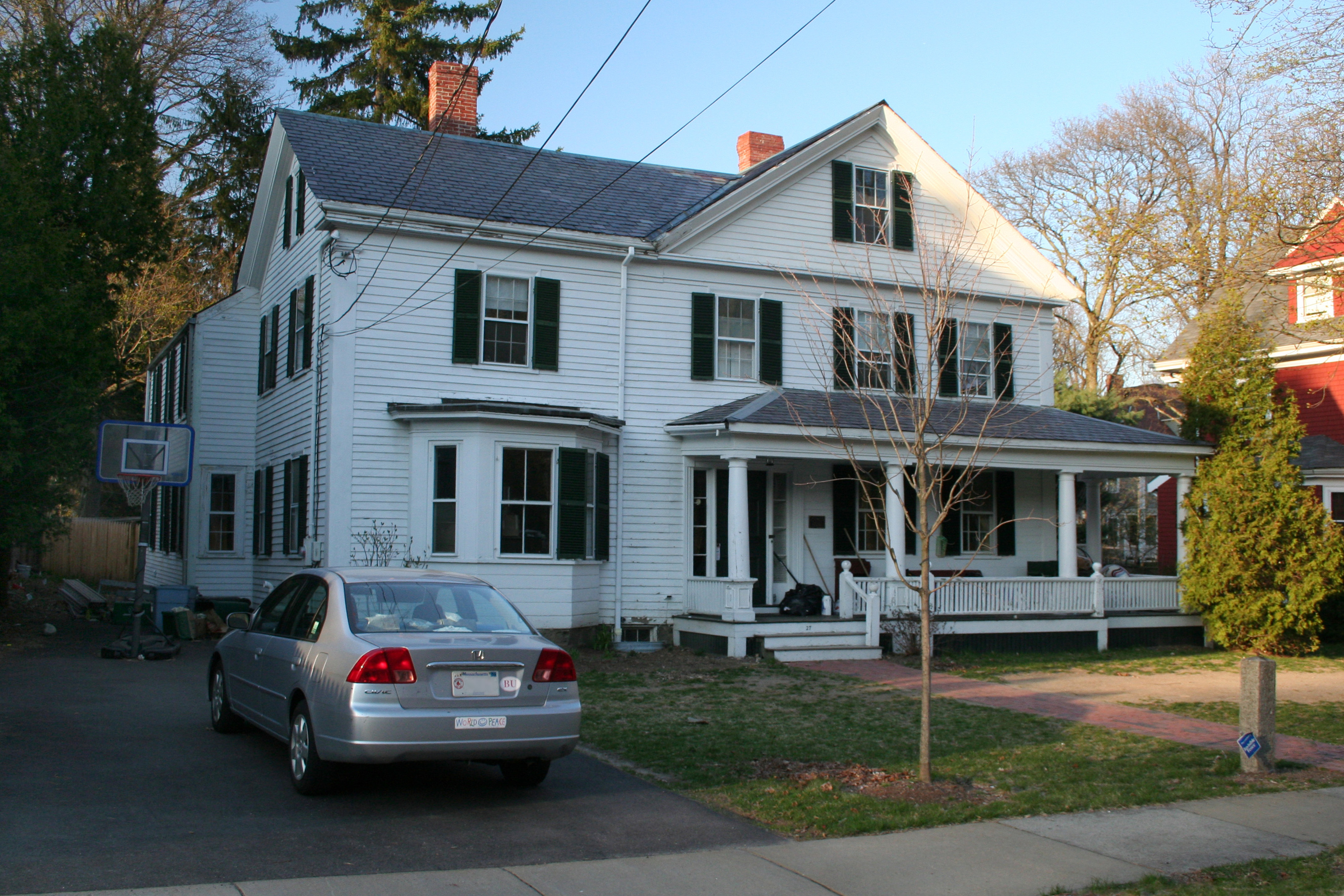

- Location within Massachusetts Location within the United States
- Location: 27 George St., Newton, Massachusetts
- Coordinates: 42°20′53″N 71°11′15″W
- Built: 1709
- Architectural style: Greek Revival
- MPS: Newton MRA
- NRHP reference No.: 86001838
- Added to NRHP: September 04, 1986

The Hyde House is a historic house located at 27 George Street in Newton, Massachusetts.

== Description and history ==
It is a 2 1/2-storey Greek Revival house, with a sidehall plan and a columned porch that wraps around two sides of the house. The oldest portion of the house is believed to date to 1709, when an even older structure burned and was immediately rebuilt (suggesting that the house may have even older timbers). The house was thereafter added to numerous times, and was moved from its original location on Centre Street to this location in 1909. The area where it stands was held in the Hyde family for eight generations, until George Hyde sold the remaining farmlands for development in the late 19th century.

The house was listed on the National Register of Historic Places September 4, 1986.

== See also ==
- Hyde Avenue Historic District, built on lands George Hyde sold off
- National Register of Historic Places listings in Newton, Massachusetts
