= Hyde House (Visalia, California) =

Historic house in California, United States

- U.S. National Register of Historic Places
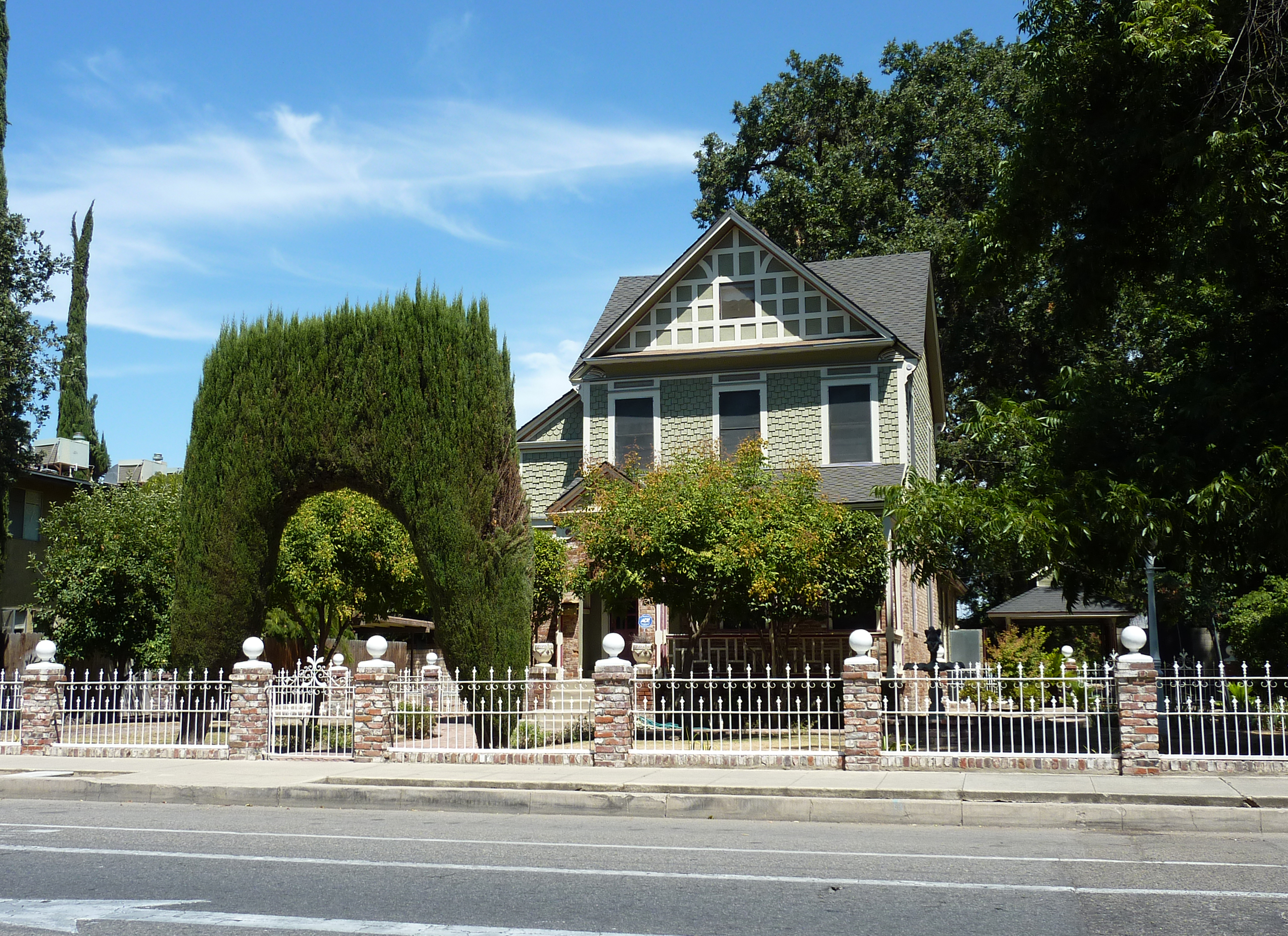

- Location within California Location within the United States
- Location: 500 S. Court St., Visalia, California
- Coordinates: 36°19′33″N 119°17′28″W
- Area: 0.1 acres (0.040 ha)
- Built: 1886
- Built by: Miller, E. O.
- Architectural style: Queen Anne
- NRHP reference No.: 79000565
- Added to NRHP: April 26, 1979

The Hyde House is a historic house located at 500 S. Court St. in Visalia, California. E. O. Miller, an investor and politician, built the house in 1886; it was purchased by investor Richard E. Hyde and his family soon afterwards. The house was mainly designed in the Queen Anne style. Its design features a half-timbered front gable end, scaled and irregular shingles, and a porch with a Chinese Chippendale railing.

The house was added to the National Register of Historic Places on April 26, 1979.
