= Gershom Hyde House =

Historic house in Massachusetts, United States

- U.S. National Register of Historic Places
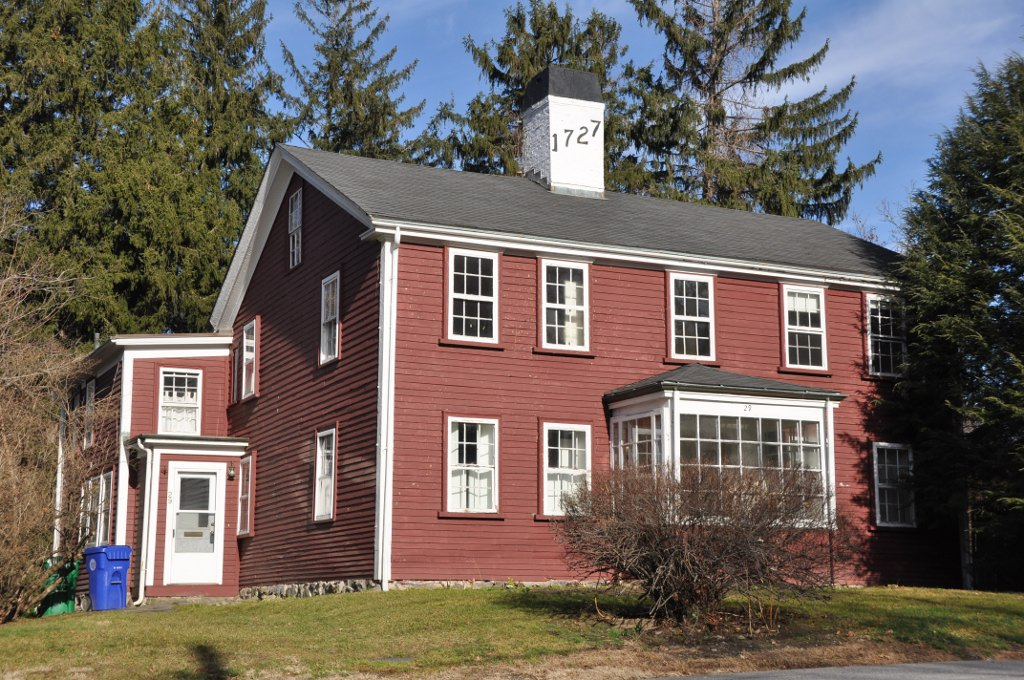

- Location within Massachusetts Location within the United States
- Location: 29 Greenwood St., Newton, Massachusetts
- Coordinates: 42°18′37″N 71°10′58″W
- Built: 1744
- Architectural style: Georgian, Mid-Georgian
- MPS: Newton MRA
- NRHP reference No.: 86001840
- Added to NRHP: September 04, 1986

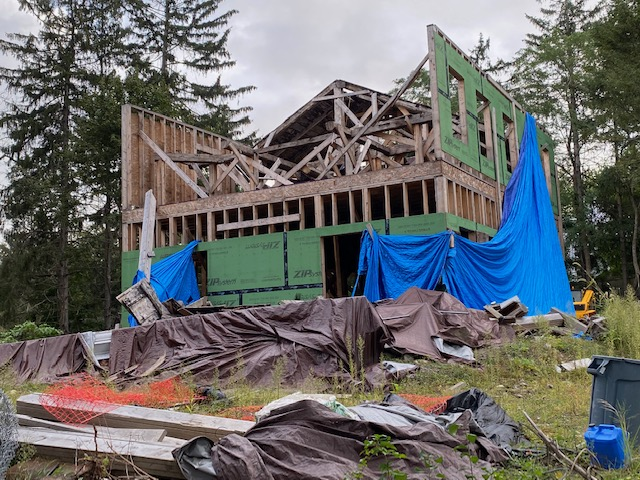
2021 photo showing new construction at the largely demolished landmark

The Gershom Hyde House was a historic house at 29 Greenwood Street in Newton, Massachusetts, US. One of the city's oldest houses, this Georgian-style farmhouse, c. 1744, was probably built by Gershom Hyde, one of Newton's early settlers. It was a 2 1/2-story wood-frame structure, five bays wide, with a side-gable roof, large central chimney, and clapboard siding. The rear ell and front porch were later additions. The house's location was along what was once a major road through the area.

The house was listed on the National Register of Historic Places in 1986. It was designated a City of Newton Local Landmark in 1997.

The house was demolished on or before April 27, 2021, without city approval by developer Ty Gupta, according to Newton, Massachusetts Department of Planning and Development meeting minutes from the May 27, 2021 session. The violation is still under review.

== See also ==
- National Register of Historic Places listings in Newton, Massachusetts
