= Samuel Hyde House =

Historic house in Washington, United States

- U.S. National Register of Historic Places
- Seattle Landmark
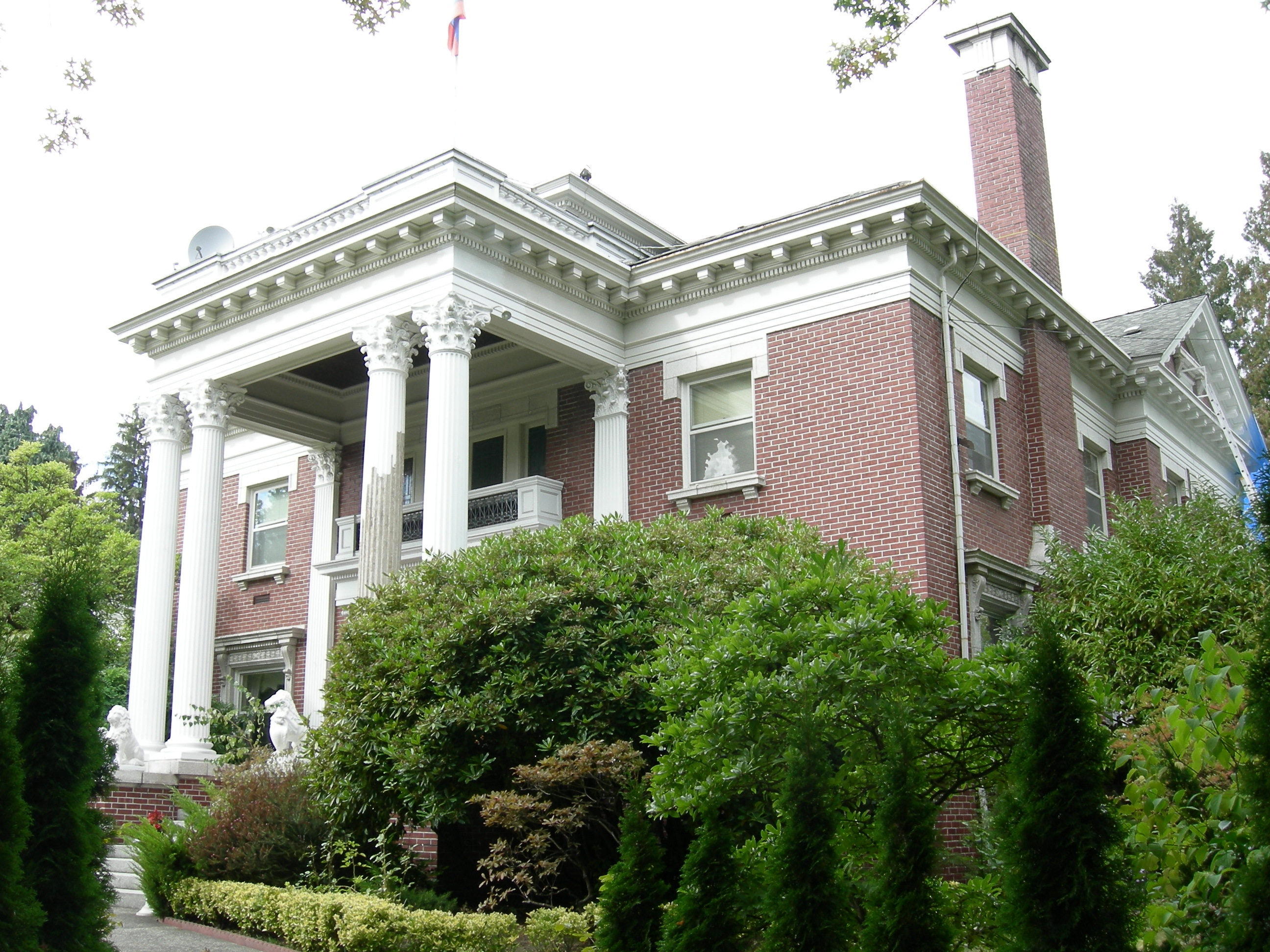
- Samuel Hyde House

- Location within Washington (state)
- Location: 3726 East Madison Street; Seattle, Washington; United States
- Coordinates: 47.631888°N 122.28453°W
- Built: 1909–1910
- Architect: Bebb and Mendel
- Architectural style: Neoclassical
- NRHP reference No.: 82004238

Significant dates
- Added to NRHP: April 12, 1982
- Designated SEATL: April 18, 1994

The Samuel Hyde House, also called the Samuel Hyde Mansion, is a two story neoclassical building at 3726 East Madison Street in Seattle, United States that had most recently been used as residence for Russia's Seattle consul general. On December 28, 1981 it was designated a Seattle landmark, and on April 12, 1982 it was listed in the National Register of Historic Places.

== History ==
The building was built in 1909–1910 by John Charles Olmsted and the architecture firm Bebb & Mendel for liquor magnate Samuel Hyde. The two-story brick house is fronted by a portico with Corinthian columns; there is a brick carriage house in back. The grounds were laid out by the Olmsted Brothers. The Olmsteds played a prominent role in designing Seattle's system of parks and boulevards, and were responsible for landscaping the grounds of the 1909 Alaska–Yukon–Pacific Exposition on the campus of the University of Washington.

The house was sold by Hyde six years after completion so he could focus his attention on his coal industry investments. Prior to 1994 the house would go thru numerous owners.

On April 21, 1994 the US government purchased the house for $1.1 million, and the US Office of Foreign Missions has had ownership of the location since then. From 1994–April 2018 the US government has allowed the house to be used as residence for Russia's Seattle consul general, and in April 2018 the US State Department evicted the consul general following the White House ordered closure of Russia's Seattle consulate office.

As of early 2025 the US and Russian governments are in talks of opening the house again.

== Gallery ==
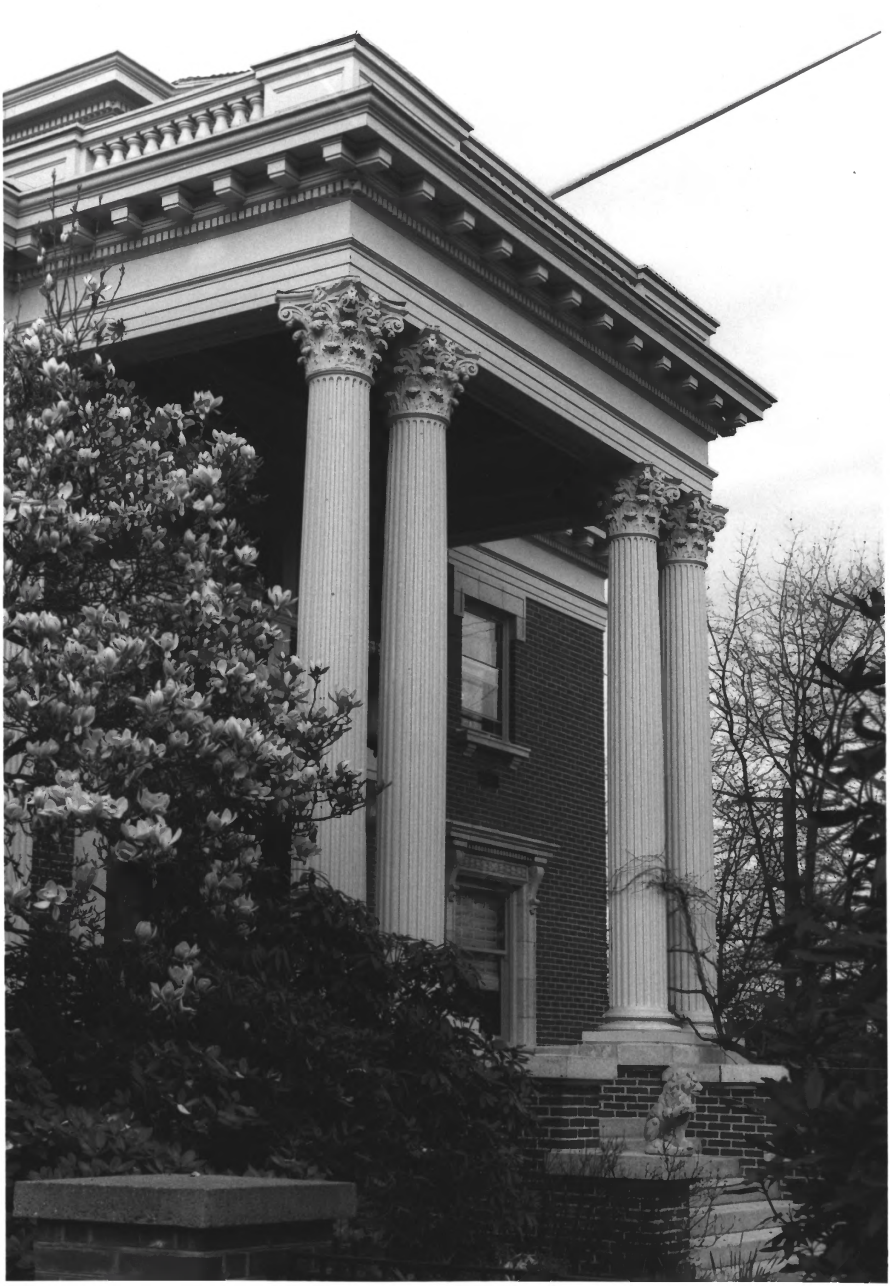
Photo of the south portico from 1981

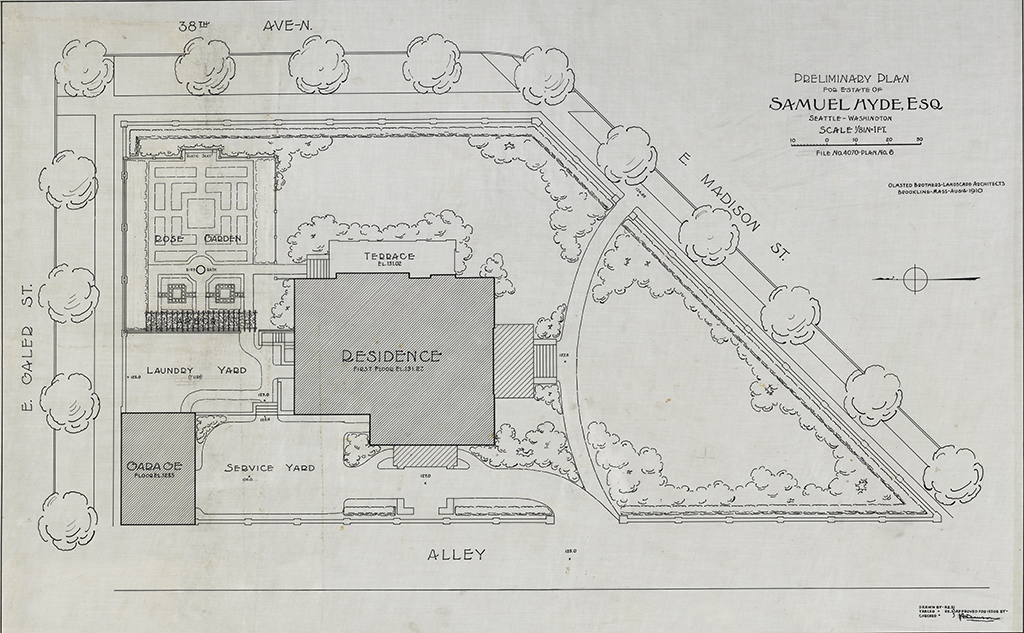
Blueprint of the house from 1910

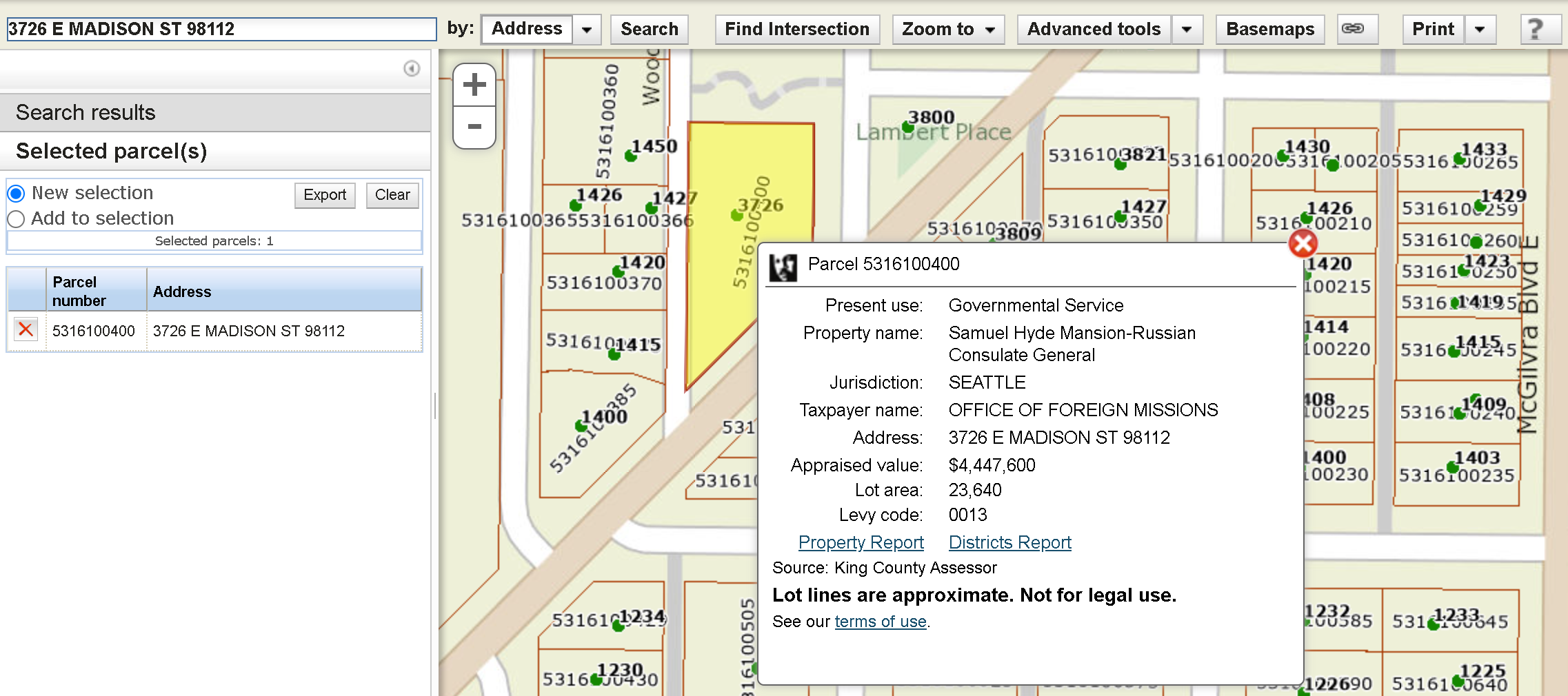
House owned by US OFM

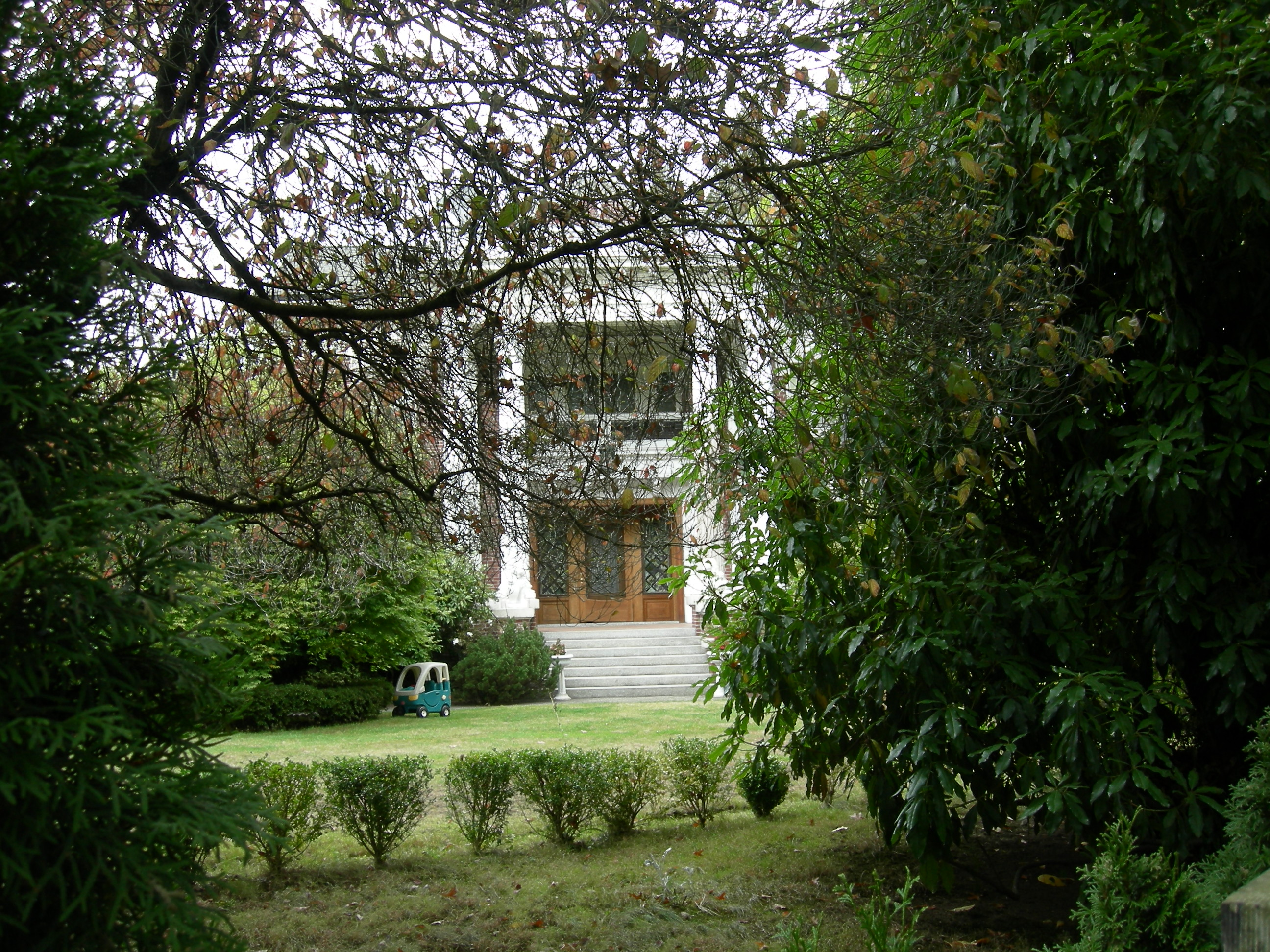
View of the south (primary) elevation

== See also ==
- Consulate General of Russia, Seattle
- List of diplomatic missions of Russia
- List of ambassadors of Russia to the United States
