= Hyde-St. John House =

Historic house in Connecticut, United States

- U.S. National Register of Historic Places
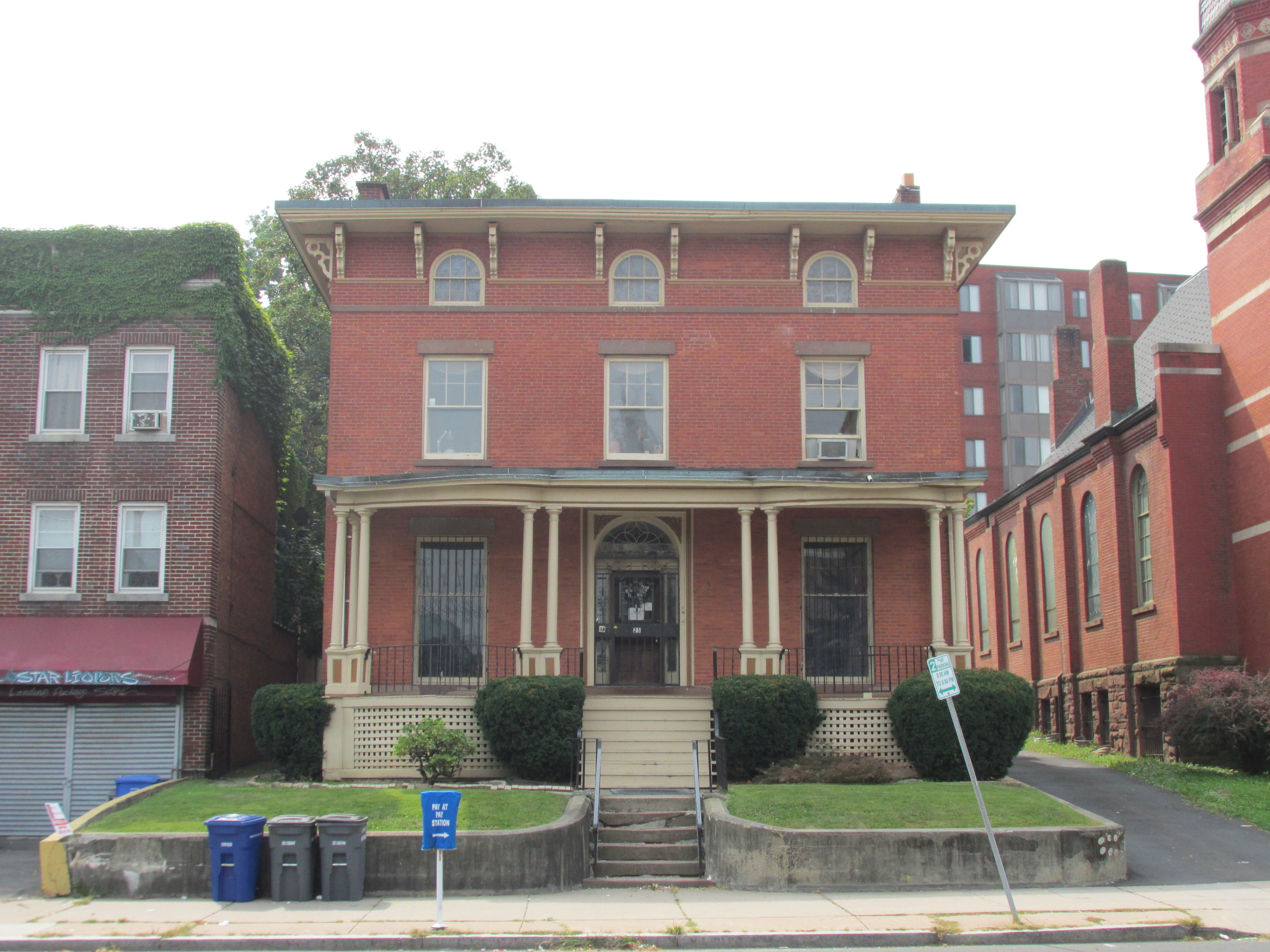

- Location within Connecticut Location within the United States
- Location: 25 Charter Oak Avenue, Hartford, Connecticut
- Coordinates: 41°45′33″N 72°40′27″W
- Area: less than one acre
- Built: 1858
- Architectural style: Italianate
- NRHP reference No.: 77001422
- Added to NRHP: October 6, 1977

The Hyde-St. John House is a historic house at 25 Charter Oak Avenue in Hartford, Connecticut. Built in 1858, it is one of the city's least-altered examples of Italianate architecture, and it was home to prominent local attorney and city mayor William Waldo Hyde. It was listed on the National Register of Historic Places in 1977, and is presently in commercial use.

== Description and history ==
The Hyde-St. John House is located in Hartford's Sheldon-Charter Oak neighborhood, on the south side of Charter Oak Avenue, between the former Temple Beth Israel (now the Charter Oak Cultural Center), and the location of the historic Charter Oak tree. It is a three-story brick structure, basically square in shape, with a flat roof that has a prominent projecting eave supported by brackets placed on either side of the three window bays. Windows on the first two floors are set in rectangular openings with brownstone sills and lintels, while the shorter third-floor windows have rounded tops. A single-story porch extends across the front, with rounded projections in the side bays, and clustered columns mounted on moulded blocks for support. The main entrance is flanked by pilasters and sidelight windows, and toppedy by a decorative rounded fanlight; there are carved wooden oak leaves in the spandrels above the fanlight. The interior features relatively unaltered original woodwork and plaster. A period two-story ell extends to the rear of the main block.

The house was built in 1858. It was home to William Waldo Hyde from 1881 to 1896. Hyde was from a prominent local family, and was a principal in one of the city's oldest law firms. From 1892 to 1894 he served as Mayor of Hartford. The Waldo and Hyde families also owned other adjacent properties during this time, essentially creating a small family compound. The building underwent restoration in the 1970s, and now houses a commercial business.

== See also ==
- National Register of Historic Places listings in Hartford, Connecticut
