= Hartwell B. Hyde House =

Historic house in Tennessee, United States

- U.S. National Register of Historic Places
- Location within Tennessee Location within the United States
- Location: TN 96, 1 mi. E of US Alt. 41, Triune, Tennessee
- Coordinates: 35°51′18″N 86°37′57″W
- Area: 1.1 acres (0.45 ha)
- Built: c. 1801, c. 1820 and c. 1880
- Architectural style: Italianate, Double pen dogtrot
- MPS: Williamson County MRA
- NRHP reference No.: 88000318
- Added to NRHP: April 13, 1988

The Hartwell B. Hyde House, also known as Solitude, is a property in Triune, Tennessee that was listed on the National Register of Historic Places (NRHP) in 1988.

Hartwell Hyde was an early settler of the Triune area. He and William Jordan arrived in 1810; Jordan's log home is the location of the Newton Jordan House, also NRHP-listed.

The Hyde House was an early plantation homes and had a flour mill and a cotton gin on the property. The Hyde plantation, with 900 acres, when owned by Mrs. E.B. Hyde, was one of a number of "productive and prosperous" antebellum plantations in the county.

The Hyde House includes Double pen, dog trot, and Italianate architecture. When listed the property included two contributing buildings on an area of 1.1 acres (0.45 ha).
